= Languages of China =

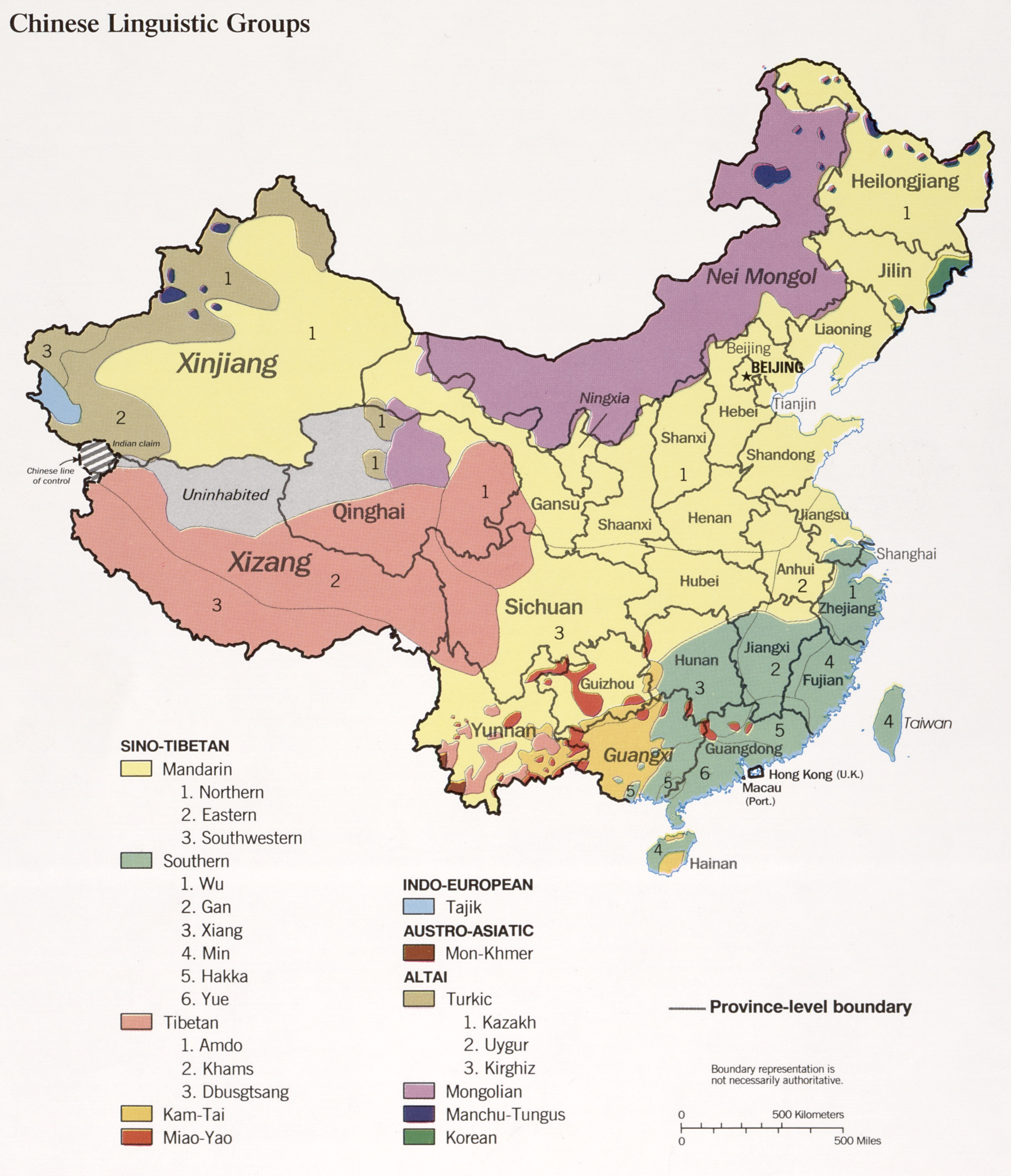
- Distribution of language families in China
- Official: Standard Mandarin; Cantonese (Hong Kong and Macau); Portuguese (Macau); English (Hong Kong); Mongolian (Inner Mongolia, Haixi in Qinghai, Bayingolin and Bortala in Xinjiang); Korean (Yanbian in Jilin); Standard Tibetan (Tibet, Qinghai); Uyghur (Xinjiang); Zhuang (Guangxi, Wenshan in Yunnan); Kazakh (Ili in Xinjiang); Yi (Liangshan in Sichuan, Chuxiong and Honghe in Yunnan)
- Signed: Chinese Sign; Hong Kong Sign; Tibetan Sign

There are several hundred languages in the People's Republic of China. The predominant language is Standard Chinese, which is based on the Beijing dialect, but there are hundreds of related Chinese languages, collectively known as Hanyu (simplified Chinese: 汉语; traditional Chinese: 漢語; pinyin: Hànyǔ; lit. 'Han language'), that are spoken by 92% of the population. The Chinese (or 'Sinitic') languages are typically divided into seven major language groups, and their study is a distinct academic discipline. They differ as much from each other morphologically and phonetically as do English, German and Danish, but speakers of different Chinese languages are taught to write in Mandarin (written vernacular Mandarin) at school and often do to communicate with speakers of other Chinese languages. This does not mean non-Mandarin Sinitic languages do not have vernacular written forms however (see, for example, written Cantonese). There are in addition approximately 300 minority languages spoken by the remaining 8% of the population of China. The ones with greatest state support are Mongolian, Tibetan, Uyghur and Zhuang, as shown in the banknote of Chinese renminbi.

According to the 2010 edition of Nationalencyklopedin, 955 million out of China's then-population of 1.34 billion spoke some variety of Mandarin Chinese as their first language, accounting for 71% of the country's population. According to the 2019 edition of Ethnologue, 904 million people in China spoke some variety of Mandarin as their first language in 2017.

Standard Chinese, known in China as Putonghua, based on the Mandarin dialect of Beijing, is the official national spoken language for the mainland and serves as a lingua franca within the Mandarin-speaking regions (and, to a lesser extent, across the other regions of mainland China). Several other autonomous regions have additional official languages. For example, Tibetan has official status within the Tibet Autonomous Region and Mongolian has official status within Inner Mongolia. Language laws of the People's Republic of China do not apply to either Hong Kong or Macau, which have Cantonese, Mandarin (both under the umbrella of "Chinese") and English and Cantonese, Mandarin and Portuguese, respectively, as official languages, unlike the mainland.

== Spoken languages ==
The spoken languages of nationalities that are a part of China belong to at least nine families:

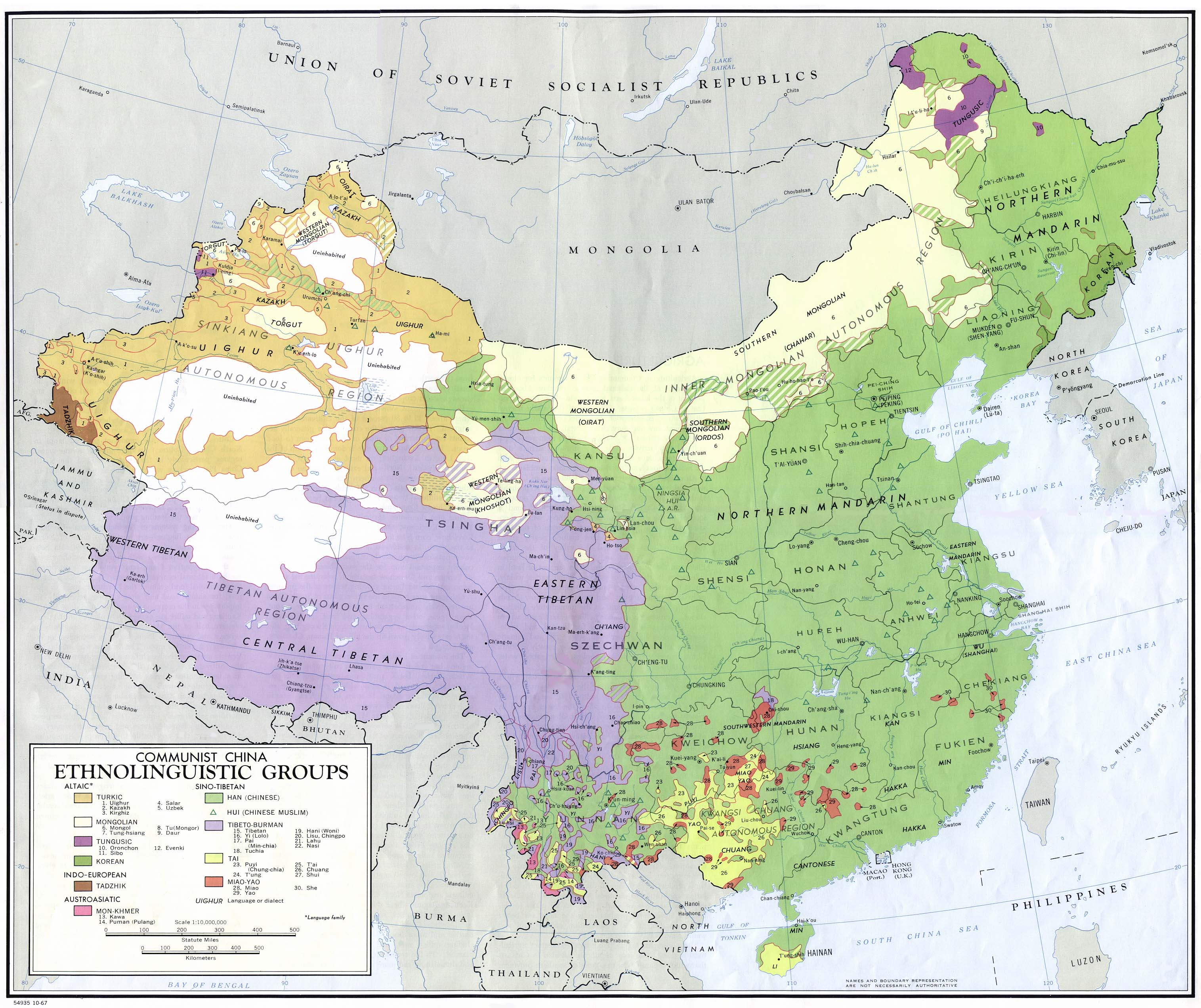
Ethnolinguistic map of China

- The Sino-Tibetan family: 19 official ethnicities (including the Han and Tibetans)
- The Tai–Kadai family: several languages spoken by the Zhuang, the Bouyei, the Dai, the Dong, and the Hlai (Li people); 9 official ethnicities.
- The Hmong–Mien family: 3 official ethnicities
- The Austroasiatic family: 4 official ethnicities (De'ang, Blang, Gin (Vietnamese), and Wa)
- The Turkic family: Uyghurs, Kazakhs, Salars, etc.; 7 official ethnicities.
- The Mongolic family: Mongols, Dongxiang, and related groups; 6 official ethnicities.
- The Tungusic family: Manchus (formerly), Hezhe, etc.; 5 official ethnicities.
- The Koreanic family: Korean
- The Indo-European family: 2 official ethnicities, the Russians and Tajiks (actually Pamiri people). There is also a heavily Persian-influenced Äynu language spoken by the Äynu people in southwestern Xinjiang, who are officially considered Uyghurs.
- The Austronesian family: 1 official ethnicity (the Gaoshan, who speak many languages of the Formosan branch), 1 unofficial (the Utsuls, who speak the Tsat language but are considered Hui.)

=== Sino-Tibetan ===
- Sinitic
  - Chinese
    - Mandarin Chinese
      - Beijing Mandarin
        - Standard Chinese
        - Singaporean Mandarin
        - Malaysian Mandarin
        - Taiwanese Mandarin
      - Northeastern Mandarin
      - Jilu Mandarin
      - Jiaoliao Mandarin
      - Central Plains Mandarin
      - Lan-Yin Mandarin
      - Lower Yangtze Mandarin
      - Southwestern Mandarin
    - Jin Chinese
    - Wu Chinese
      - Shanghainese
      - Suzhounese
      - Wenzhounese
    - Huizhou Chinese
    - Yue Chinese
      - Cantonese
      - Taishanese
    - Ping Chinese
    - Gan Chinese
    - Xiang Chinese
    - Hakka Chinese
    - Min Chinese
      - Southern Min
        - Hokkien
        - Teochew Min
        - Hainanese
        - Leizhou Min
        - Haklau Min
      - Eastern Min
      - Pu–Xian Min
      - Northern Min
      - Central Min
      - Shao–Jiang Min
    - Xiangnan Tuhua
    - Shaozhou Tuhua
    - Ba–Shu Chinese (extinct)
- Bai
  - Dali language (大理語)
    - Dali dialect (Bai: Darl lit)
    - Xiangyun dialect
  - Yitdut language/Jianchuan language (劍川語)
    - Yitdut dialect (Bai: Yit dut)
    - Heqing dialect (Bai: hhop kait)
  - Bijiang language
    - Bijiang dialect
    - Lanping dialect (Bai: ket dant)
- Songlin
- Cai-Long
  - Caijia
- Tibeto-Burman
  - Tujia
  - Puroik
  - Qiangic
    - Qiang
      - Northern Qiang
      - Southern Qiang
    - Gyalrongic
      - Gyalrong (rGyalrong, Jiarong)
      - Khroskyabs (Lavrung)
      - Horpa (Stau)
    - Prinmi
    - Muya (Munya)
    - Zhaba
    - Choyo (Queyu)
    - Tangut (extinct)
  - Tibeto-Kanauri
    - Bodish
      - Tibetan
        - Central Tibetan (Standard Tibetan)
        - Amdo Tibetan
        - Khams Tibetan
        - Baima
      - Tshangla
    - Zhangzhung (extinct)
  - Lolo–Burmese–Naxi
    - Burmish
      - Achang
      - Chashan
      - Bola
      - Zaiwa
      - Langsu
      - Lashi
    - Loloish
      - Yi
      - Lisu
      - Lahu
      - Hani
      - Jino
    - Nakhi/Naxi
  - Jingpho–Nungish–Luish
    - Jingpho
    - Nungish
      - Derung
      - Nung
    - Nu
      - Nusu
      - Rouruo
  - Mishmi
    - Mijuish
      - Miju (Midzu, Kman, Geman, Kaman)
      - Zakhring (Meyor)
    - Digarish
      - Idu
      - Digaro
  - Tani
    - Damu
    - Bokar

=== Kra–Dai ===
- Be
- Kra
  - Gelao
- Kam–Sui
  - Dong
  - Sui
  - Maonan
  - Mulao/Mulam
- Hlai/Li
- Tai
  - Zhuang (Vahcuengh)
    - Northern Zhuang
    - Southern Zhuang
  - Bouyei
  - Dai
    - Tai Lü language
    - Tai Nüa language
    - Tai Dam language
    - Tai Ya language

=== Turkic ===
- Karluk
  - Ili Turki
  - Uyghur
  - Uzbek
- Kipchak
  - Kazakh
  - Kyrgyz
  - Tatar
- Oghuz
  - Salar
- Siberian
  - Äynu
  - Fuyu Kyrgyz
  - Western Yugur
  - Tuvan
  - Old Uyghur (extinct)
- Old Turkic (extinct)

=== Mongolic ===
- Mongolian
- Oirat
  - Torgut Oirat
- Buryat
- Daur
- Southeastern
  - Monguor
    - Eastern Yugur
  - Dongxiang
  - Bonan
  - Kangjia
- Tuoba (extinct)

Para-Mongolic

- Khitan (extinct)
- Tuyuhun (extinct)

=== Tungusic ===
- Southern
  - Manchu
    - Jurchen
  - Xibe
  - Nanai/Hezhen
- Northern
  - Evenki
  - Oroqen

=== Koreanic ===
- Korean
- Yukjin

=== Hmong–Mien ===
- Hmong
- Mien
- She
- Xong
- Hmu

=== Austroasiatic ===
- Pakanic
  - Bolyu
  - Bugan
- Mang
- Palaungic
  - Palaung (De'ang, Ta'ang)
  - Riang
  - Angkuic
    - Hu (Angku, Kon Keu)
    - Man Met (Kemie)
    - U
    - Va (Northern, Southern)
    - Avala
    - Auva (Alva, Auwa)
    - Ghu
    - Dagun
  - Bit–Khang languages
    - Buxing
    - Bumang
  - Waic
    - Blang (Pulang, Samtao)
    - Wa (Va)
- Khmuic
  - Kammu Yuan
- Vietic
  - Vietnamese

=== Austronesian ===
- Formosan languages
- Tsat

=== Indo-European ===
- Russian
- Tocharian (extinct)
- Saka (extinct)
- Pamiri (mislabelled as "Tajik")
  - Sarikoli
  - Wakhi
- Portuguese (official in Macau)
- English (official in Hong Kong)

=== Yeniseian ===
- Jie (Kjet) (extinct) (?)

=== Mixed ===
- E (Tai–Pinghua mixed language)
- Hezhou (Uyghur-Mandarin mixed language or a Uyghur creole)
- Macanese Patois (Portuguese–Cantonese creole)
- Tangwang (Mandarin–Santa mixed language)
- Wutun (Lower Yangtze Mandarin–Amdo–Bonan mixed language)

=== Unclassified ===
- Rouran (Rouran) (extinct)
- Nam (extinct)

== Written languages ==
The first page of the astronomy section of the 御製五體清文鑑 (Yuzhi Wuti Qing Wenjian). The work contains four terms on each of its pages, arranged in the order of Manchu, Tibetan, Mongolian, Chagatai, and Chinese languages. For the Tibetan, it includes both transliteration and a transcription into the Manchu alphabet. For the Chagatai, it includes a line of transcription into the Manchu alphabet.

The following ethnic minority languages traditionally had written forms that do not involve Chinese characters:

- Tai Lü language – Tai Lü alphabet
- Tai Nüa language – Tai Nüa script
- Dagur language – Manchu alphabet
- Hmongic languages – Hmong writing (Pollard script, Pahawh Hmong, Nyiakeng Puachue Hmong, etc.)
- Kazakh language – Kazakh alphabets
- Korean language – Chosŏn'gŭl alphabet
- Kyrgyz language – Kyrgyz alphabets
- Lisu language – Lisu script
- Manchu language – Manchu alphabet
- Mongolian language – Mongolian writing
- Naxi language – Dongba characters
- Qiang language or Rrmea language – Rma script
- Santa language – Arabic script
- Sui language – Sui script
- Tibetic languages – Tibetan script
- Uyghur language – Uyghur Arabic alphabet
- Xibe language – Manchu alphabet
- Loloish languages – Yi script

Many modern forms of spoken Chinese languages have their own distinct writing system using Chinese characters that contain colloquial variants. These typically are used as sound characters to help determine the pronunciation of the sentence within that language:

- Cantonese – Written Cantonese
- Shanghainese – Written Shanghainese
- Hokkien – Written Hokkien

Some non-Sinitic languages have historically used Chinese characters:

- Korean language – Hanja
- Vietnamese language – Chữ Nôm
- Zhuang languages – Sawndip
- Bouyei language – Bouyei writing (方塊布依字)
- Bai language – Bai writing (僰文)
- Kam language – Dong writing (方塊侗字)

Other languages, all now extinct, used separate logographic scripts influenced by, but not directly derived from, Chinese characters:

- The Jurchens (Manchu ancestors) – Jurchen language – Jurchen script
- The Khitans (Mongolic people) – Khitan language – Khitan large and small scripts
- The Tanguts (Sino-Tibetan people) – Tangut language – Tangut script

During Qing dynasty, palaces, temples, and coins have sometimes been inscribed in five scripts:

- Chinese
- Manchu
- Mongol
- Tibetan
- Chagatai

During the Mongol Yuan dynasty, the official writing system was:

- 'Phags-pa script

The reverse of a one jiao note with Chinese (Pinyin) at the top and Mongolian, Tibetan, Uyghur, and Zhuang along the bottom.

Chinese banknotes contain several scripts in addition to Chinese script. These are:

- Latin alphabet (for Chinese)
- Mongolian script
- Tibetan script
- Arabic script (for Uyghur)
- Latin alphabet (for Zhuang)

Other writing system for Chinese languages in China include:

- Nüshu script
- Dongba symbols (pictograph) - Naxi language

Ten nationalities who never had a written system have, under the PRC's encouragement, developed phonetic alphabets. According to a government white paper published in early 2005, "by the end of 2003, 22 ethnic minorities in China used 28 written languages."

== Language policy ==
One decade before the demise of the Qing dynasty in 1912, Mandarin was promoted in the planning for China's first public school system. There is a debated myth, prevalent among speakers of Yue Chinese, that Cantonese lost to Mandarin in a narrow vote on the language of the new Republic of China.

Standard Mandarin (Putonghua) has been promoted as the commonly spoken language for the People's Republic since 1956, based phonologically on the dialect of Beijing, grammatically and lexically on various Mandarin varieties, and stylistically on the writings of Mao Zedong and Lu Xun. Pronunciation is taught with the use of the romanized phonetic system known as pinyin. Pinyin has been criticized for fear of an eventual replacement of the traditional character orthography.

=== Ethnic minority language policy ===
The Chinese language policy in mainland China is heavily influenced by the Soviet nationalities policy and officially encourages the development of standard spoken and written languages for each of the nationalities of China. Language is one of the features used for ethnic identification. In September 1951, the All-China Minorities Education Conference established that all minorities should be taught in their language at the primary and secondary levels when they count with a writing language. Those without a writing language or with an "imperfect" writing language should be helped to develop and reform their writing languages.

However, in this schema, Han Chinese are considered a single nationality and the official policy of the People's Republic of China (PRC) treats the different varieties of Chinese differently from the different national languages, even though their differences are as significant, if not more so, as those between the various romance languages of Europe. While official policies in mainland China encourage the development and use of different orthographies for the national languages and their use in educational and academic settings, realistically speaking it would seem that, as elsewhere in the world, the outlook for minority languages perceived as inferior is grim. The Tibetan Government-in-Exile argues that social pressures and political efforts result in a policy of sinicization and feels that Beijing should promote the Tibetan language more. Because many languages exist in China, they also have problems regarding diglossia. Recently, in terms of Fishman's typology of the relationships between bilingualism and diglossia and his taxonomy of diglossia (Fishman 1978, 1980) in China: more and more minority communities have been evolving from "diglossia without bilingualism" to "bilingualism without diglossia." This could be an implication of mainland China's power expanding.

In 2010, Tibetan students protested against changes in the Language Policy on the schools that promoted the use of Mandarin instead of Tibetan. They argued that the measure would erode their culture. In 2013, China's Education Ministry said that about 400 million people were unable to speak Mandarin. In that year, the government pushed linguistic unity in China, focusing on the countryside and areas with ethnic minorities.

Mandarin Chinese is the prestige language in practice, and failure to protect ethnic languages does occur. In summer 2020, the Inner Mongolian government announced an education policy change to phase out Mongolian as the language of instructions for humanities in elementary and middle schools, adopting the national instruction material instead. Thousands of ethnic Mongolians in northern China gathered to protest the policy. The Ministry of Education describes the move as a natural extension of the Law of the People's Republic of China on the Standard Spoken and Written Chinese Language (Chinese: 通用语言文字法) of 2000.

In 2024, General Secretary of the Chinese Communist Party Xi Jinping called for wider use of Mandarin by ethnic minorities and in border areas. He stated that it is necessary to guide all ethnic groups in border regions to "continuously enhance their recognition of the Chinese nation, Chinese culture and the Communist Party".

== Study of foreign languages ==
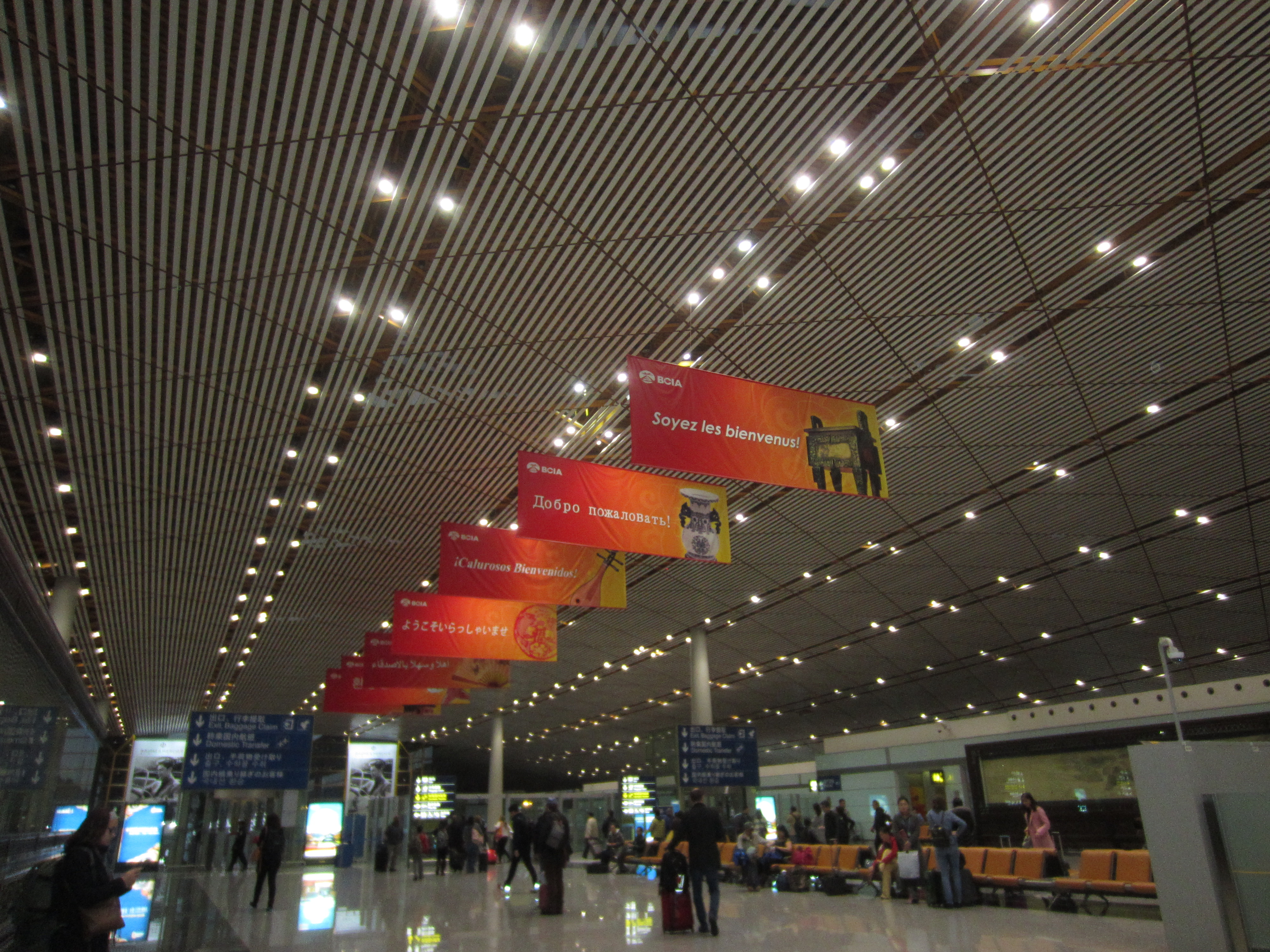
Welcome signs in various languages at Beijing Capital International Airport. Front to back: French, Russian, Spanish, Japanese, Arabic, and Korean.

=== Indo-European ===
==== English ====
English has been the most widely-taught foreign language in China; it is a required subject for students attending university.

After the Reform and opening up policy in 1988, English was taught in public schools starting in the third year of primary school. The Economist reported in 2006 that up to one fifth of the population was learning English. Gordon Brown, the former British prime minister, estimated that the total English-speaking population in China would outnumber the native speakers in the rest of the world in two decades. In China, English is used as a lingua franca in several fields, especially for business settings, and in schools to teach Standard Mandarin to people who are not Chinese citizens. English is also one of the official languages in Hong Kong, as prescribed by Chapter 1, Article 9 of the Basic Law of Hong Kong.

==== German ====
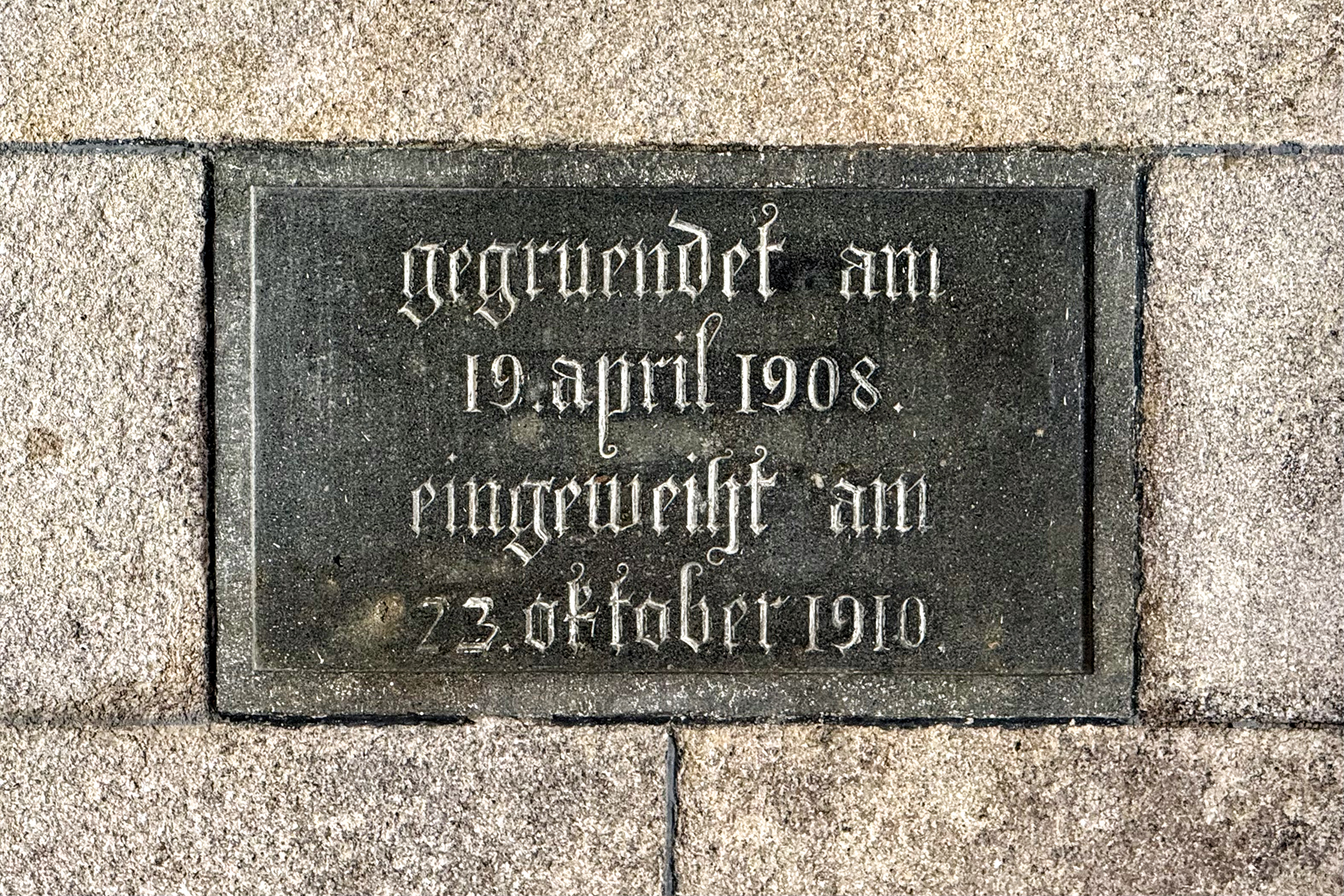
A German-language inscription on the Christ's Church, Qingdao

As of 2015, about 170,000 people have studied the German language in China.

==== Spanish ====
Due to growing interest in Latin America within China, about 20,000 people in China have studied the Spanish language as of 2016. As of 2018, there are about 120 Spanish-language departments nationwide.

==== Portuguese ====
Interest in Portuguese has increased greatly, due in part to Chinese investment in African nations such as Angola, Mozambique, and Cape Verde. Portuguese is also one of the official languages in Macau, although its use had stagnated since the nation's transfer from Portugal to the PRC. It was estimated in 2016 that 2.3% of Macau's locals spoke the language, although with government backing since then, interest in it has increased. Macau is used by China as a hub for learning Portuguese and diplomatic and financial ties with Brazil and Portuguese-speaking African countries. As of 2018, there are about 40 Portuguese-language departments nationwide.

==== Russian ====
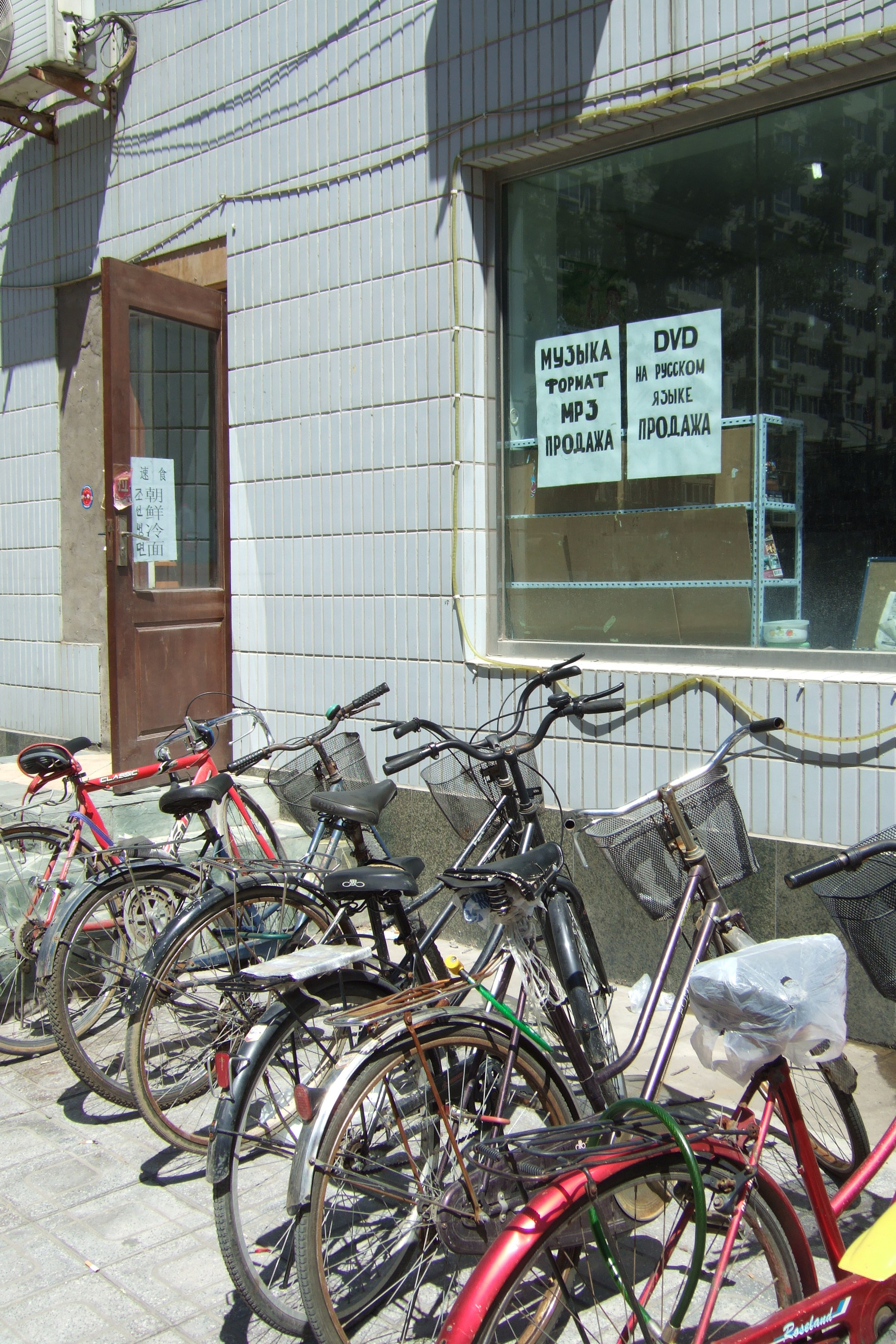
A handwritten Russian-language sign on a window in Beijing

Many middle and high schools in China have offered Russian-language courses. For example, Jianwen Foreign Language School, a high school located in the city of Shenzhen, has offered a Russian program since 2011.

==== Urdu ====
There have also been a growing number of students choosing to learn Urdu, due to interest in Pakistani culture, close ties between the respective nations, and job opportunities provided by the CPEC.

=== Arabic ===
There have been a growing number of students studying Arabic, due to reasons of cultural interest and belief in better job opportunities. The language is also widely studied amongst the Hui people. In the past, literary Arabic education was promoted in Islamic schools by the Kuomintang when it ruled mainland China.

=== Esperanto ===
Esperanto became prominent in certain circles in the early 20th century and reached its peak in the 1980s, though by 2024 its prominence had declined.

=== Japanese ===
As of 2012, a little over one million people in China were studying Japanese, and there were 16,752 Japanese-language teachers. Learner motivations included interest in Japan's society and culture.

=== Korean ===
There are about 2 million Korean language speakers in China.

Korean language education in China began in the year 1945 at the National Oriental Language College. Some non-Korean families have learned Korean because they expect to attain educational success or to increase their business connections with South Korea.

== See also ==
- Language Atlas of China
- Linguistic Atlas of Chinese Dialects
- Varieties of Chinese
- List of varieties of Chinese
- Han Chinese subgroups
- Demographics of China
- Racism in China
- Hong Kong English
- Languages of Hong Kong
- Culture of Macau
- Macanese Portuguese
- List of ethnic groups in China
- Classification of Southeast Asian languages
- Cantonese
- Standard Chinese
- Chinglish
