= Tai Loi language =

Austroasiatic language spoken in Myanmar and China

Tai Loi
- Mong Lue
- Native to: Burma, Laos
- Native speakers: (5,000 cited 1995–2008)
- Language family: Austroasiatic: Khasi–Palaungic; Palaungic; (various); Tai Loi

Language codes
- ISO 639-3: tlq
- ELP: Tai Loi
- Tai Loi is classified as Critically Endangered by the UNESCO Atlas of the World's Languages in Danger

Tai Loi, also known as Mong Lue, refers to various Palaungic languages spoken mainly in Burma, with a few hundred in Laos and some also in China. Hall (2017) reports that Tai Loi is a cover term meaning 'mountain Tai' in Shan, and refers to various Angkuic, Waic, and Western Palaungic languages rather than a single language or branch. The Shan exonym Tai Loi can refer to:

- Western Palaungic branch: De'ang
- Lametic branch: Lamet
- Angkuic branch: Muak Sa-aak, Mok
- Waic branch
  - Wa: Meung Yum, Savaiq, etc.
  - Plang: Phang, Kontoi, Pang Pung, etc.

Additionally, Ethnologue (21st edition), citing Schliesinger (2003), lists Doi as a Tai Loi variety in Ban Muang, Sing District, Luang Namtha Province, Laos as a nearly extinct language variety spoken by an ethnic group comprising 600 people and 80 households as of 2003. Schliesinger (2003) reports that elderly Doi speakers can understand the Samtao language. There is considerable variation among the dialects. The Muak Sa-aak variety of Tai Loi shares 42% lexical similarity with U of China; 40% with Pang Pung Plang; and 25% with standard Wa.
