= Mok language =

Austroasiatic language spoken in Myanmar and Thailand

Mok
- Region: Shan State, Myanmar and Thailand
- Native speakers: 4,700 (2018)
- Language family: Austroasiatic: Khasi–Palaungic; Palaungic; Angkuic; Mok

Language codes
- ISO 639-3: mqt
- Glottolog: mokk1243
- ELP: Mok
- Mok is classified as Critically Endangered by the UNESCO Atlas of the World's Languages in Danger

Mok (/mɔ̀k/ 'mountain people'), also known as Amok, Hsen-Hsum, and Muak, is an Angkuic language or dialect cluster spoken in Shan State, Myanmar

Seven speakers in Lampang province, Thailand, were reported by Wurm & Hattori (1981).

== Varieties ==
Hall & Devereux (2018) report that five varieties of Mok are spoken in Shan State, Myanmar, providing the following comparative vocabulary table. These varieties have some lexical similarity (the lowest being 88%) with each other, but very low lexical similarity with the other Angkuic languages.

Gloss	Mok A	Mok B	Mok C	Mok D	Mok E	Muak Sa-aak	Pa Xɛp U	Hu
die	[jɛ́m]	[n̩jém]	[jám]	[jɛ́m]	[jɛ̂m]	jâm	jàp	jám
weep	[jàːm]	[jàːm]	[jàːm]	[jàːm]	[jàːm]	jâːm	jâm	jàm
chicken	[ʔèa]	[ʔeàː]	[ʔìa]	[ʔeàː]	[ʔeàː]	ʔɛ̂l	jɛ́	-
silver, money	[mûi]	[nèŋ]	[ŋə̀n]	[muí]	[p.sí muî]	mûl	mùn	mm̥úl
fly (v.)	[tʰə̀ːŋ]	[tʰiaŋ] / [pʰiaŋ]	[ntʰíaŋ]	[mpʰîang]	[ntʰîaŋ]	pʰ.jûl	mpʰə̀	phɨ́ʁ
louse	[síʔ] / [nsíʔ]	[síʔ] / [nsíʔ]	[nsíʔ]	[síʔ] / [nsíʔ]	[síʔ] / [nsíʔ]	cʰíʔ	nchí	nsíʔ

Owen (2018) names these varieties Hwe Law, Chieng Kham, Pha Lam, Punglong, and Hwe Koi.

A Mok dialect of Shan State has been documented by Shintani (2019).

== Geographic distribution ==
Tannumsaeng (2020) describes three locations for Mok: between Mong Khet and Mong Yang and south of Kengtung in Myanmar, and on the Thai-Burmese border in Chiang Rai Province, Thailand. The main Mok-speaking areas in Shan State include an area just to the south of Kengtung, and another area situated between Mong Khet and Mong Yang.

== Phonology ==
Tannumsaeng (2020), citing Hall & Devereux (2018), provides the following phonology for Mok.

The consonants are /pʰ p m f w tʰ t n s l r c ɲ j kʰ k ŋ ʔ h/, with reduced /m̩ n̩ ɲ̩ ŋ̍ pə tə kə sə/. /f/ and /r/ only appear in certain varieties. The vowels are /i e ɛ u ɯ o ɤ ɔ a/, with the diphthongs /ia ɯa ua/. Mok has two tones, one low and one high.

=== Consonants ===
		Labial	Alveolar	Palatal	Velar	Glottal
Plosive	Voiceless	p	t	c	k	ʔ
Plosive	Aspirated	pʰ	tʰ		kʰ	
Nasal		m	n	ɲ	ŋ	
Fricative		f	s			h
Trill			r			
Approximant		w	l	j	(w)	

=== Vowels ===
	Front	Central	Back
Close	i		ɯ • u
Close-mid	e	ə	ɤ • o
Open-mid	ɛ	ə	ɔ
Open	a		

Where there are two vowels separated by a dot •, the one on the left is unrounded and the one on the right is rounded.
