= Auva language =

Austroasiatic language spoken in Yunnan, China

Auva
- Alva, Auwa
- Pronunciation: [ɔ˥ va̱˨˩]
- Native to: China
- Region: Wendong Wa Ethnic Township, Lancang Lahu Autonomous County, Yunnan
- Language family: Austroasiatic: Khasi–Palaungic; Palaungic; Angkuic; Northern Angkuic; Auva

Language codes
- ISO 639-3: None (mis)
- Glottolog: None

Auva (Auva pronunciation: [ɔ˥ va̱˨˩] "human being") or Alva, Auwa is a Northern Angkuic language of Yunnan, China. Its speakers are an unclassified ethnic minority; the Chinese government counts the Auva speakers as members of the Bulang nationality, but the Angkuic languages are not intelligible with Bulang.

Auva speakers refer to themselves as [va̱˨˩] or [ɔ˥ va̱˨˩], which are cognates to the U autonym uʔ⁵⁵ ("human being") and other Angkuic languages. Neighboring atonal Waic speakers, who are classified as ethnic Wa, call the Auva as vaʔ.

== Sociolinguistics ==
Auva and Waic speakers resides in the same village clusters of Wendong Wa Ethnic Township, Lancang Lahu Autonomous County, Yunnan. Despite both being Palaungic languages, the two are mutually unintelligible and are classified as separate ethnic groups, Blang and Wa, respectively.

Auva is closely related to U, together forming a Northern Angkuic dialect chain scattered across West-Central Yunnan. Individual lects are undergoing rapid diversification.

== Phonology ==
=== Consonants ===
==== Onsets ====
Auva onsets
		Labial	Alveolar		Retroflex	(Alveolo-) Palatal	Velar	Uvular	Glottal
		Labial	central	sibilant	Retroflex	(Alveolo-) Palatal	Velar	Uvular	Glottal
Plosive	plain	p	t		ʈ͡ʂ	t͡ɕ	k	q	ʔ
Plosive	aspirated	pʰ	tʰ		ʈ͡ʂʰ	t͡ɕʰ	kʰ		
Plosive	voiced	b	d			d͡ʑ	g		
Fricative	voiceless	f	ɬ	s	ʂ	ɕ			h
Fricative	voiced	v			ʐ	ʑ			
Nasal	voiceless	m̥	n̥			ȵ̥	ŋ̥		
Nasal	voiced	m	n			ȵ	ŋ		
Lateral			l						
Rhotic			r		ɻ				

==== Codas ====
Auva codas
	Bilabial	Alveolar	Palatal	Velar	Glottal
Plosive	p	t		k	ʔ
Nasal	m	n		ŋ	
Glide	u̯		i̯		

=== Vowels ===
Unlike the neighboring Waic language, Auva vowels have both lax and tense quality. Creaky voice is reported by Hsiu (2015), but there is no available example. The source lists Auva diphthongs as follows: /au ua ue uə uo ui iə ia ɤi ei ɔi/.

Auva monophthongs
	Front		Central		Back	
	plain	tense	plain	tense	plain	tense
Close	i	i̠			u	u̠
Close-mid	e	e̠	ɤ	ɤ̠	o	o̠
Mid			ə			
Open-mid	ɛ	ɛ̠			ɔ	ɔ̠
Open		æ̠	a	a̠		

=== Suprasegmentals (tones) ===
Auva has at least five or six tones according to the sources: /55/, /51/, 35/, /33/, /21/, and /13/.

== Lexicon ==
=== Pronouns ===
	singular	plural
1st person	ʔau⁵⁵	ʔɤi⁵⁵
2nd person	mi⁵¹	pʰɤi⁵⁵
3rd person	ʔɤt⁵⁵	kɤi³¹

=== Numerals ===
Note: loan words are not displayed.

Gloss	Auva	proto-Palaungic
1	ma²¹	*moːh
2	ʔa⁵¹	*ləʔaːr
3	ʔuei⁵¹	*ləʔɔːj
4	(Tai loan)	*poːn
5	–	*pəsan
6	–	*tɔːl
7	–	*təpuːl
8	–	*taːʔ
9	–	*tiːm
10	–	*kɤːl
100	pak¹³	*prjah
1000	r̥eŋ⁵⁵	*sreːŋ

=== Flora & colors ===
Gloss	Auva	proto-Palaungic
black	tɕʰem⁵¹	*jam, *laŋ
bamboo	r̥ɤk⁵⁵	*hrəŋ
flower	ʐaŋ⁵¹	*raːŋ
fruit	pʰli⁵¹	*pleeʔ
green/blue	ɬəŋ⁵¹	*sŋaal, *ɲ(ɛ/iə)r
house	qaŋ⁵¹	*gaaŋ; *ɲaaʔ; *slaŋ
leaf	ɬa̱²¹si̱²¹	*hlaʔ
red	tɕʰɻaŋ⁵¹/tʂʰaŋ⁵¹	*rooŋ
rice tree	ŋ̥ɔ̱²¹	*sŋɔːʔ
taro	tɕʰɻu̱²¹	sᵊroʔ
yellow	pʰɔ̃²¹	*rmiit

=== Fauna ===
Gloss	Auva	proto-Palaungic
buffalo	tʰrak⁵¹	*traːk
bear	kʰrih³¹	*kreːs
bee	ɕiar⁵¹	*psiər
bird	kʰuəŋ⁵¹ tɕʰim²¹	*ciːm
dog	tɕʰɔ̱²¹	*cɔːʔ
fowl	ʔiə̃⁵¹	*ʔiɛr
horse	bra̱k⁵⁵	*mraŋ
louse	dʑʰi⁵¹	*ciːʔ
pig	li̱k⁵⁵	*-leːk
tiger	vai⁵¹	*rwaaj
