= Zhongyu =

Zhongyu may refer to:

- Zhongyu, Tibet, township of Tibet, China
- Liaoning Zhongyu, former name of Liaoning Hongyun, Chinese football club
- Shanxi Zhongyu, Chinese basketball club
- Languages of China, collectively known as Zhongyu (中语)
