= Streptomyces fuscichromogenes =

Scientific classification
- Domain: Bacteria
- Kingdom: Bacillati
- Phylum: Actinomycetota
- Class: Actinomycetia
- Order: Streptomycetales
- Family: Streptomycetaceae
- Genus: Streptomyces
- Species: S. fuscichromogenes

Binomial name
- Streptomyces fuscichromogenes Zhang et al. 2017

Type strain
- CGMCC 4.7110, KCTC 29195, m16

Species of bacterium

Streptomyces fuscichromogenes is a bacterium species from the genus of Streptomyces which has been isolated from soil from Xishuangbanna in China.

== See also ==
- List of Streptomyces species
