= Zhuaraneus =

Scientific classification
- Kingdom: Animalia
- Phylum: Arthropoda
- Subphylum: Chelicerata
- Class: Arachnida
- Order: Araneae
- Infraorder: Araneomorphae
- Family: Araneidae
- Genus: Zhuaraneus; Mi, Wang & Li, 2024

Type species
- Z. daoxiang Mi, Wang & Li, 2024

Species
- 3, see text

Genus of spiders

Zhuaraneus is a genus of spiders in the family Araneidae.

== Distribution ==
Two species are described from Vietnam, with the type species Z. daoxiang only known from Xishuangbanna in Yunnan province, China.

== Etymology ==
The genus is named after Chinese arachnologist Chuan-Dian Zhu (Chinese: 朱传典; pinyin: Zhūchuándiǎn), in combination with the related genus Araneus.

The type species Z. daoxiang is named after the song 稻香; Dào xiāng ("rice fragrance") by Taiwanese singer Jay Chou.

== Taxonomy ==
Z. ethani and Z. eugenei were transferred from genus Araneus based on external characteristics.

== Species ==
As of October 2025, this genus includes three species:

- Zhuaraneus daoxiang Mi, Wang & Li, 2024 – China (type species)
- Zhuaraneus ethani (Mi, Li & Pham, 2023) – Vietnam
- Zhuaraneus eugenei (Mi, Li & Pham, 2023) – Vietnam
