= Man Met =

Man Met may refer to:

- Man Met Language, a language spoken in Jinghong County, China
- Manchester Metropolitan University, a university in Manchester, England
