= Xishuangbanna Dai Autonomous Prefecture =

Autonomous prefecture in Yunnan, China

Xishuangbanna Prefecture 西双版纳州 · Sibsongpanna · Sipsong Panna
- Autonomous prefecture
- Xishuangbanna Dai Autonomous Prefecture 西双版纳傣族自治州

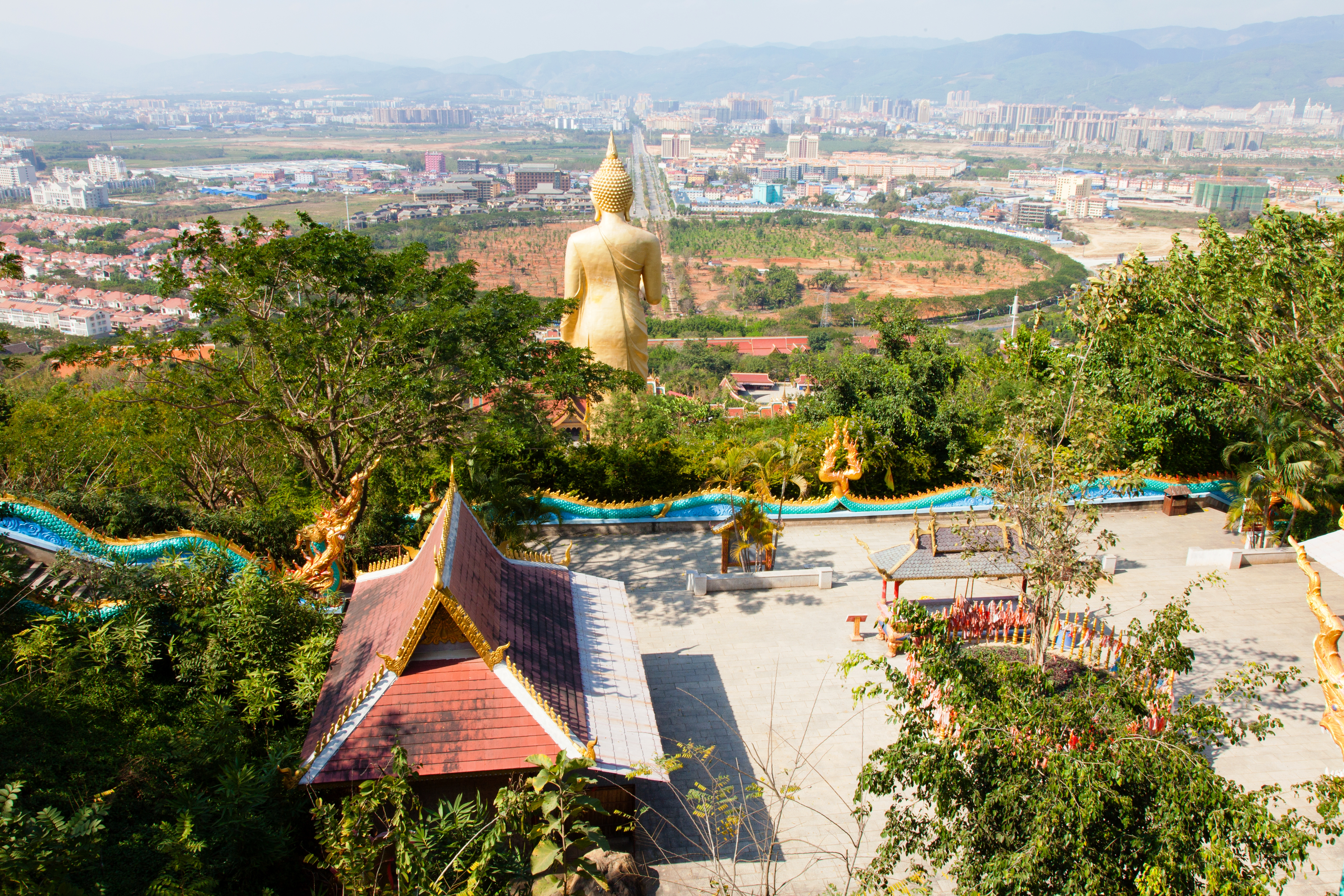
- Jinghong City

- Location of Xishuangbanna Dai Autonomous Prefecture in Yunnan
- Coordinates: 22°00′N 100°48′E
- Country: China
- Province: Yunnan Province
- GB/T 2260 CODE: 532800
- Admin HQ: Jinghong
- Admin units: List: Jinghong; Menghai County; Mengla County

Government
  - Type: Autonomous prefecture
  - CCP Secretary: Zheng Yi
  - Congress Chairman: Xu Jiafu
  - Governor: Dao Wen
  - CPPCC Chairman: Zhang Xing

Area
  - Total: 19,700 km^{2} (7,600 sq mi)

Population (2010)
  - Total: 1,133,515
  - Density: 57.5/km^{2} (149/sq mi)

GDP
  - Total: CN¥ 72.1 billion US$ 10.6 billion
  - Per capita: CN¥ 55,194; US$8,141
- Time zone: UTC+08:00 (Chinese Standard Time)
- Postal code: 666100
- Area code: +959
- ISO 3166 code: CN-YN-28
- License Plate Prefix: 云K
- Website: www.xsbn.gov.cn
- "Yunnan Statistics Bureau". Archived from the original on 2018-03-12. "Yunnan Portal".

Xishuangbanna Dai Autonomous Prefecture

Chinese name
- Simplified Chinese: 西双版纳傣族自治州
- Traditional Chinese: 西雙版納傣族自治州
Transcriptions
Standard Mandarin
- Hanyu Pinyin: Xīshuāngbǎnnà Dǎizú Zìzhìzhōu
- Wade–Giles: Hsi^{1}-shuang^{1}-pan^{3}-na^{4} Tai^{3}-tsu^{2} Tzu^{4}-chih^{4}-chou^{1}
- IPA: [ɕíʂwáŋpànnâ tàɪtsǔ tsîʈʂîʈʂóʊ]
Yue: Cantonese
- Jyutping: Sai^{1}soeng^{1}baan^{2}naap^{6} Daai^{2}zuk^{6} Zi^{6}ci^{4}zau^{1}

Lao name
- Lao: ແຂວງສິບສອງປັນນາ; Khwaeng Sibsongpanna

Tai Lü name
- Tai Lü: ᩈᩥ᩠ᨷᩈᩬᨦᨻᩢ᩠ᨶᨶᩣ ᧑᧒ᦗᧃᦓᦱ [síp.sɔ́ŋ.pân.nâː]

Hani name
- Hani: Xisual banaq

Akha name
- Akha: Sǐsǎwpâna

Burmese name
- Burmese: လူးဆယ့်နှစ်ပန္နား luu sae nhait pan narr

Thai name
- Thai: สิบสองปันนา sibsong panna

Xishuangbanna, sometimes shortened to Banna, is one of the eight autonomous prefectures in Yunnan, China. This autonomous prefecture for Dai people lies in the extreme south of Yunnan, bordering both Myanmar and Laos. Xishuangbanna lies at latitude 21°10′-22°40′ and longitude 99°55′-101°50′ east, on the northern edge of the tropics south of the Tropic of Cancer. It has an area of 19,124.5 square kilometers, bordering Pu'er City to the northeast and northwest, Laos to the southeast and Myanmar to the southwest. The border is 966.3 kilometres or 600.4 miles long, one river connects six countries, and there are four national ports. The prefectural seat is Jinghong, the largest settlement in the area and one that straddles the Mekong, called the "Lancang River" in Chinese.

This region of China is noted for the distinct culture of its ethnic groups, which is very different from that of the Han Chinese. The people, architecture, language and culture more closely resemble those of the Shan, Dai and Tai peoples, which includes the Thai and Lao. By the end of 2024, the resident population of the whole state will be 1,336,000.

== Etymology ==
Sibsongpanna (Tai Lue: ᧑᧒ᦗᧃᦓᦱ; Thai: สิบสองพันนา, romanized: Sipsong Panna; Lao: ສິບສອງພັນນາ, romanized: Sipsǭng Phannā; Shan: သိပ်းသွင်ပၼ်းၼႃး, romanized: Sípsǎung Pánnáa) is a Tai Lü compound consisting of sipsong (᧑᧒, 'twelve'), pan (ᦗᧃ, 'township') and na (ᦓᦱ, 'rice paddy'). The name refers to the traditional division of the mueang into twelve districts, which were called panna (lit. 'township rice-fields'). The etymology is parallel to the autonomous Tai-speaking region in French Indochina from 1890 to 1945 that was called Sip Song Chau Tai, meaning 'twelve Tai cantons'. Xishuangbanna was mentioned as ancestral land Möng Ri Möng Ram in Tai-Ahom Manuscript Lit Phi written by Ahom descendants of Dai people of Yunnan who later migrated to Assam.

== History ==
Before 1886, the region was called Chiang Hung, a Tai Lue kingdom that was contended between China, Lanna and the Burmese dynasties. After the Mongol conquest in 1296, the subsequent Ming and Qing emperors appointed the Tai Lue rulers of Chiang Hung as a native Tusi governor. In 1563, King Bayinnaung of Burma's Taungoo Dynasty captured Chiang Hung. The Burmese and the Chinese agreed on the joint domination over Xishuangbanna, whose ruler was enthroned in a ceremony in which both Burmese and Chinese representatives jointly presided.

In the 19th century, the region briefly became a tributary state of Luang Prabang and the Rattanakosin Kingdom during the Burmese–Siamese War (1849–1855). When the British Empire occupied Upper Burma in 1886, it became a part of the British Raj. In 1892, the British transferred Chiang Hung to the Qing dynasty.

In the chaos of the Xinhai Revolution, which overthrew the Qing government in 1911 in favor of a Chinese republican government, a local leader, the Chao Maha of Meng Jie, staged a rebellion against Qing remnant officials. The Yunnan provincial government of the newly established Republic of China sent troops in 1913 to oust the Chao Meng Jie rebels. Ke Shuxun remained in Xishuangbanna to govern with his "13 Principles of Governing the Frontier", which emphasized equality between Han and Dai in areas such as land ownership and taxation; allowed intermarriage between the ethnic groups; and promoted education in secular and technical subjects, rather than Burmese-based monastic education. The Second Sino-Japanese War (1931–1945) saw the heavy bombardment of Xishuangbanna by Japanese troops and a simultaneous influx of Pan-Taiist propaganda from Japan's ally, Thailand. According to Hsieh, that reduced the appeal of a broad pan-Tai identity among the Dai Lue.

During the final phase of the Chinese Civil War, many remnants of the Kuomintang fled from Chinese Communists forces into Burma's Shan State from Xishuangbanna. The new People's Republic of China sent various non-military expeditions to Xishuangbanna from 1949 to provide services such as schools and hospitals to replace those by western Christian missionaries.

The Communists took control of the prefecture from Kuomintang loyalists in 1952. On January 23, 1953, the PRC established the Xishuangbanna Dai Autonomous Region and ended the native-chieftain system. That year, the People's Congress of Xishuangbanna created the New Tai Lue alphabet, based on the Tai Tham alphabet, to print material in the Tai Lü language.

Xishuangbanna was made an autonomous prefecture in 1955 but lost some territory on the creation of Jingdong Yi Autonomous County and Jiangcheng Hani and Yi Autonomous County. Land reform started in earnest in January 1956, destroying the power of the village headmen. State-owned rubber plantations accounted for most of the region's wealth during the early communist period.

Xishuangbanna also received an influx of educated youth during the Down to the Countryside Movement of the Cultural Revolution (1966–1976) during which Buddhist temples in Xishuangbanna were used as barns. They were restored to their original purpose in 1981.

In 1987, the Xishuangbanna government promulgated the Law of the Xishuangbanna Dai Nationality Autonomous Prefecture for Self-government to bring local laws into line with the national Law of the People's Republic of China for Regional National Autonomy.

Shao Cunxin (召存信, 1922–2015), the former head of the chieftain's outer council (1944–1950) and chief of Meng Peng (1938–1950), was the chief of the autonomous prefecture from 1955 to 1992.

== Administrative subdivisions ==
Historical population
Year	Pop.	±%
2000C	993,397	—
2010C	1,133,515	+14.1%

Xishuangbanna governs one county-level city and two counties.

Map
Name	Chinese characters	Pinyin	Population (2000C)	Population (2010C)	Urban Pop (2000C)	Urban Pop (2010C)	Area (km^{2})	Density (/km^{2})
Jinghong City	景洪市	Jǐnghóng Shì	443,600	519,935	138,939	205,523	7,133	73
Menghai County	勐海县	Měnghǎi Xiàn	314,100	331,850	34,241	94,945	5,511	60
Mengla County	勐腊县	Měnglà Xiàn	235,700	281,730	55,632	84,625	7,056	40

- references:Xishuangbanna Gov, Citypopulation.de Yunnan Urban Populations.

== Geography ==
The prefecture has an area of 19,700 km^{2} (7,600 sq mi). Xishuangbanna is the home of the Dai people. The region sits at a lower altitude than most of Yunnan, and has a tropical savanna climate (Köppen climate classification Aw).

Climate data for Jinghong
Month	Jan	Feb	Mar	Apr	May	Jun	Jul	Aug	Sep	Oct	Nov	Dec	Year
Record high °C (°F)	31.5 (88.7)	34.3 (93.7)	37.5 (99.5)	41.1 (106.0)	40.1 (104.2)	37.7 (99.9)	35.7 (96.3)	35.8 (96.4)	35.4 (95.7)	34.1 (93.4)	31.8 (89.2)	30.2 (86.4)	41.1 (106.0)
Mean daily maximum °C (°F)	26.3 (79.3)	29.5 (85.1)	31.9 (89.4)	33.4 (92.1)	33.0 (91.4)	32.2 (90.0)	31.1 (88.0)	31.4 (88.5)	31.4 (88.5)	29.7 (85.5)	27.5 (81.5)	25.0 (77.0)	30.2 (86.4)
Daily mean °C (°F)	19.3 (66.7)	21.1 (70.0)	23.6 (74.5)	26.0 (78.8)	27.2 (81.0)	27.7 (81.9)	27.1 (80.8)	27.2 (81.0)	26.8 (80.2)	25.0 (77.0)	22.1 (71.8)	19.3 (66.7)	24.4 (75.9)
Mean daily minimum °C (°F)	12.3 (54.1)	12.7 (54.9)	15.2 (59.4)	18.6 (65.5)	21.4 (70.5)	23.2 (73.8)	23.1 (73.6)	22.9 (73.2)	22.1 (71.8)	20.3 (68.5)	16.6 (61.9)	13.6 (56.5)	18.5 (65.3)
Record low °C (°F)	2.7 (36.9)	6.6 (43.9)	6.2 (43.2)	11.9 (53.4)	16.2 (61.2)	18.1 (64.6)	18.9 (66.0)	19.3 (66.7)	16.2 (61.2)	12.0 (53.6)	7.2 (45.0)	1.9 (35.4)	1.9 (35.4)
Average rainfall mm (inches)	20.3 (0.80)	9.5 (0.37)	28.4 (1.12)	56.3 (2.22)	130.6 (5.14)	138.0 (5.43)	232.4 (9.15)	217.4 (8.56)	138.9 (5.47)	104.4 (4.11)	41.1 (1.62)	22.9 (0.90)	1,140.2 (44.89)
Average rainy days (≥ 0.1 mm)	2.9	2.6	4.6	9.7	16.2	19.1	22.7	21.4	15.4	11.8	5.5	3.7	135.6
Average relative humidity (%)	77	66	65	68	74	79	83	83	83	84	83	82	77
Mean monthly sunshine hours	212.5	230.5	229.9	228.3	206.0	155.5	125.0	149.7	173.3	166.9	181.5	175.9	2,235
Percentage possible sunshine	63	71	62	60	50	39	30	38	47	47	55	53	51
Source 1: China Meteorological Administration (precipitation days, humidity, sunshine 1991–2020)
Source 2: Weather China

== Biodiversity ==
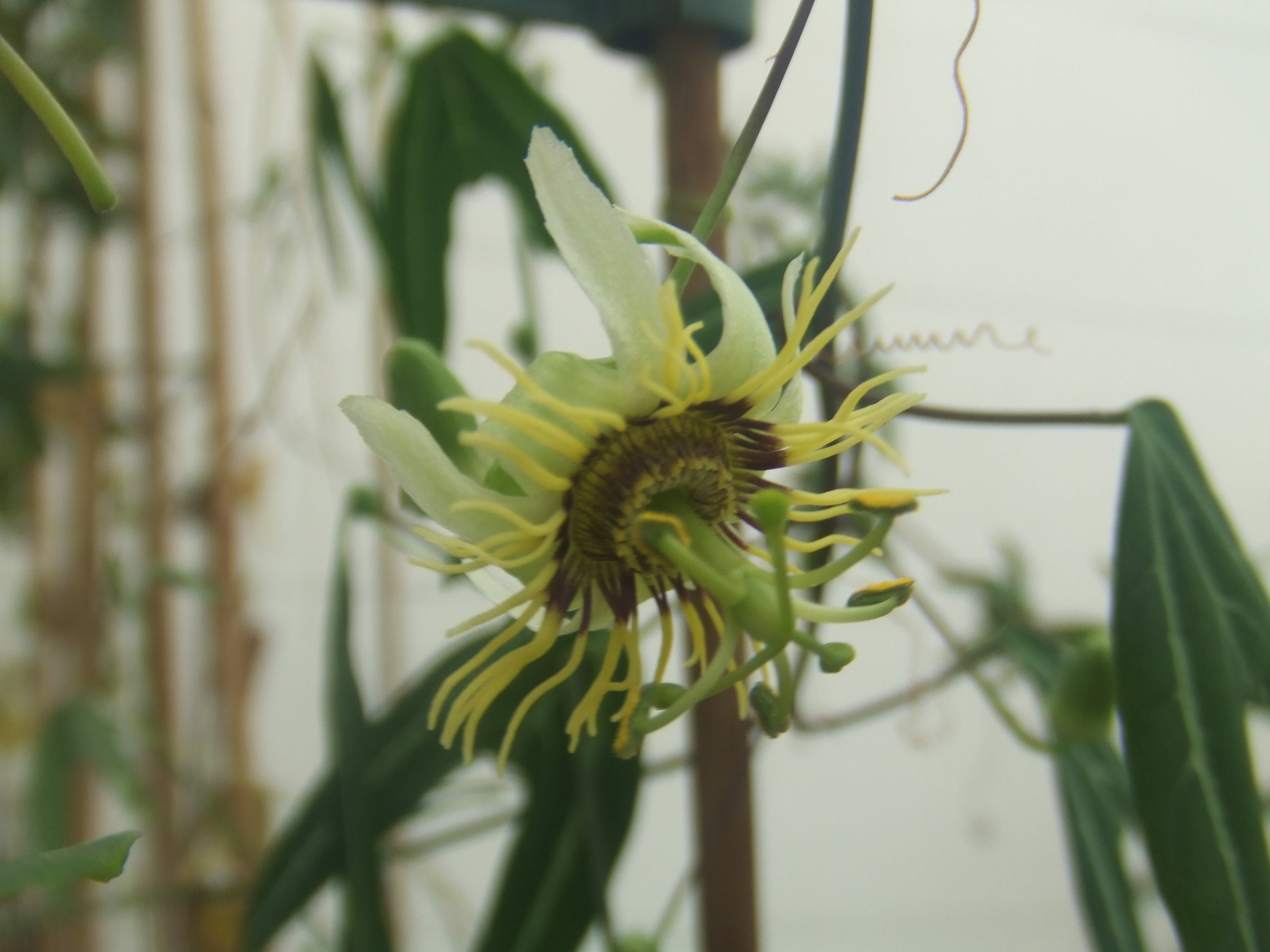
Passiflora xishuangbannaensis

Xishuangbanna harbors much of the biodiversity of Yunnan, which harbors much of the biodiversity of China. Its tropical climate and its remoteness until recent times account for this. In addition to an abundance of plants, Xishuangbanna is home to the last few Asian elephants still in China; the species roamed over a large part of the country even as late as a few hundred years ago. The elephants are protected in a reserve, but for five decades the plant diversity has been threatened by, the proliferation of natural rubber plantations which completely destroy the rainforest and replace it with a monoculture of trees originally from Brazil.

Passiflora xishuangbannaensis is a recently discovered passiflora species that is endemic to Xishuangbanna.

== Demographics ==
The 2000 national census documented that Xishuangbanna had 993,978 inhabitants with a population density of 50.43 inhabitants per km^{2}. According to the 2000 national census, Dai people make up the plurality at 29.89%, with the Han Chinese coming in at a close second at 29.11%. At the time of the 1977 census, however, Han people made up the largest single ethnic group in Xishuangbanna, making up 36.53% of a population of 627,089, while Dai made up 33.15%, and others 30.32%. The Xishuangbanna government has strived to maintain this ethnic balance of around 33% of each group: Han, Dai, and other; this policy is known as "the plan of three-three-three" (三三三计划; sān-sān-sān jìhuà).

Before the increasing social mobility of the 1940s, inhabitants of Xishuangbanna called each other "basin people" (壩區民族; bàqū mínzú) or "mountain people" (山區民族; shānqū mínzú) in reference to the groups' stereotyped location. The Han and Dai lived mostly around the basins and played a socially dominant role, while the non-Dai ethnic minorities lived in the mountains and were politically disenfranchised. The Dai used to be called the Baiyi (摆夷), and until a 1936 Kuomintang reform, the bai part was written with the dog radical (犭). The PRC government decided that regardless of radical, the term Baiyi is pejorative, and adopted Jud Pai (傣) instead. Historically, some ethnic minorities adapted some Dai characteristics in order to alleviate discrimination and increase their social status, such as the Blang people adopting the sarong, practicing matrilocal residence, and learning the Tai Tham alphabet.

=== Ethnic groups ===
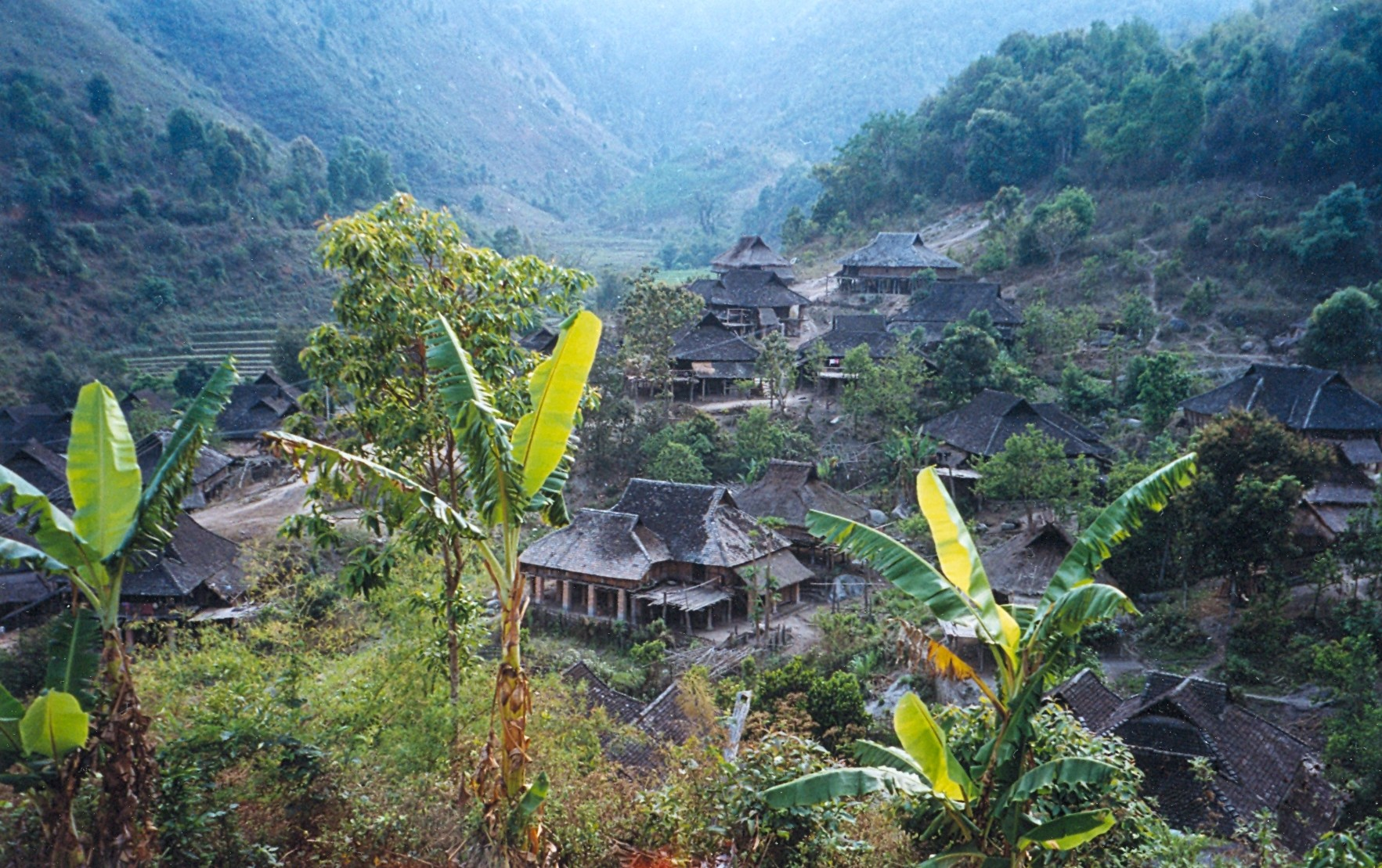
The Blang village of Manpo.

Ethnic groups in Xishuangbanna, 2000 census
Ethnicity	Population	Percentage
Dai (Tai Lü, Tai Ya, Tai Nüa, Tai Yuan, Lao)	296,930	29.89%
Han Chinese	289,181	29.11%
Hani	186,067	18.73%
Yi	55,772	5.61%
Lahu	55,548	5.59%
Blang	36,453	3.67%
Jino	20,199	2.03%
Yao	18,679	1.88%
Miao	11,037	1.11%
Bai	5,931	0.6%
Jingpo	5,640	0.57%
Hui	3,911	0.39%
Wa	3,112	0.31%
Zhuang	2,130	0.21%
Others	2,807	0.3%

In Jinghong City and Menghai County, the two major Hani subgroups are Jiuwei 鸠为 and Jizuo 吉坐. The Jizuo 吉坐 are the largest Hani ethnic subgroup in Jinghong.

The Jiuwei claim to have migrated from Honghe and Mojiang. The Jiuwei live in various villages in Jinghong, including:

- Mengbozhai 勐波寨, Menghan Town 勐罕寨, Jinghong City
- Agupu 阿古普 (also called Manwoke 曼窝科) in Leiwu 类吴, Mengsong Township 勐宋, Jinghong City
- Napazhai 那帕寨 in Damenglong 大勐笼, Jinghong City
- Baiya village 拜牙村 in Menghun 勐混, Menghai County (The Ake 阿克 subgroup lives in Lougu 楼固村, located in Menghun 勐混 as well.)
- Babingzhai 坝丙寨, Xidingshan 西定山, Menghai County

There are also ethnic Hani that are locally called Aini 爱尼 living in 7 villages on Nanlin Mountain 南林山 of southwestern Jinghong, namely Manbage 曼八阁, Manjinglong 曼景龙, Manjingnan 曼景囡, Mangudu 曼固独, Manbaqi 曼把奇, Manbasan 曼巴伞, and Manjingmai 曼景卖.

=== Languages ===
Ethnic minority languages spoken in Xishuangbanna include:

- Tai Lü (Dai)
- Man Met (Blang)
- Hu (Blang)
- Blang (Blang)
- Muak Sa-aak (Blang)
- Bit (Blang)

== Culture ==
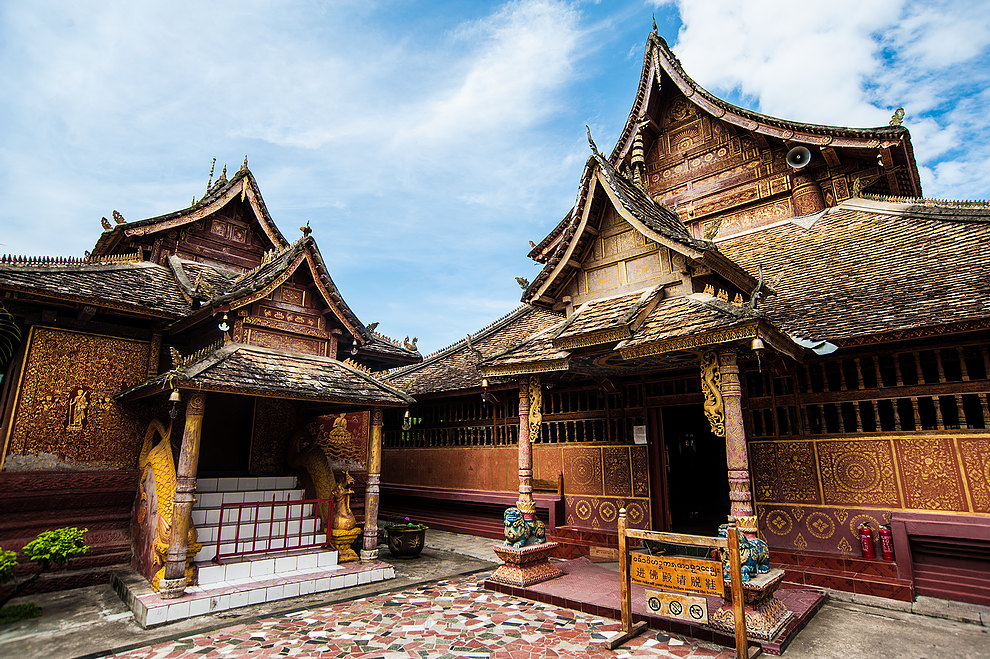
Dai Ethnic Garden, 30 kilometers away from Jinghong city, is a popular ethnic theme park with natural Dai village and Buddhist temple

The six famous tea mountains region (Chinese: 六大茶山; pinyin: Liù Dà Chá Shān) located in the prefecture produces some of the most highly regarded Pu-erh tea in the 20th century.

Xishuangbanna is rich in nature, historical and cultural resources, noted for its folklore, rain forests, rare plants, and wildlife. Its major tourist attractions include Menglun Tropical Botanical Garden, Manfeilong Pagodas (Tanuozhuanglong), Jingzhen Pavilion, Wild Elephant Gully, Dai people's village at Ganlanba. The Manchunman Buddhist Temple, which has a history of more than 1400 years, is also a very popular tourist attraction. The complex is made up of four parts, the main hall, the sutra collection pavilion, the gold pagoda, and the drum tower. The temple is well known within the Southeast Asian region and each year attracts Buddhist monks and visitors from Sri Lanka, Thailand, Myanmar and Laos.

The well-known traditional festival is the Dai New Year, known as the Water-Splashing Festival. It lasts for three days from April 13 to 15. Besides the water festival event it also consists of some other events such as dragon boat races, the firing of indigenous missiles, and flying Kongming lamps.

== Transport ==
Since the opening of the Xishuangbanna Gasa International Airport (formerly Jinghong International Airport) in 1990, traveling to Xishuangbanna by air has become more popular and convenient and there are daily flights connecting Xishuangbanna with Kunming City. The area also has air connections with Dali, Chengdu and Bangkok. The Xishuangbanna Airport is 6 km (3.7 mi) south of Jinghong City.

There are also bus routes to places all over Yunnan and neighboring provinces. It is 590 kilometres or 370 miles from Kunming to Jinghong. Long-distances buses depart from Kunming South Station and arrive at Jinghong Bus Station, costing CNY 210–250, which is about 8–10 hours duration.

In October 2010, plans were announced for a 530 km (330 mi) railway linking Xishuangbanna to Vientiane, Laos; the railway is now completed and in operation. Connections to Thailand are also possible.

== See also ==
- Sip Song Chau Tai
- Xishuangbanna Tropical Botanical Garden

== Literature ==
- Davis, Sara (2006). "Premodern Flows in Postmodern China: Globalisation and the Sipsongpanna Tais". Centering The Margin: Agency And Narrative In Southeast Asian Borderlands. Berghahn Books. pp. 87–110.
- Giersch, Charles Patterson (2006). Asian Borderlands: The Transformation of Qing China's Yunnan Frontier. Harvard University Press.
- Forbes, Andrew; Henley, David (2011). China's Ancient Tea Horse Road. Chiang Mai: Cognoscenti Books. ASIN B005DQV7Q2.
- Hsieh, Shih-Chung (July 1989). Ethnic-political adaptation and ethnic change of the Sipsong Panna Dai: an ethnohistorical analysis (PhD). The University of Washington.
- Hansen, Mette Halskov (1999). "Teaching Backwardness or Equality: Chinese State Education Among the Tai in Sipsong Panna". China's National Minority Education: Culture, Schooling, and Development. Routledge. pp. 243–279.
- Hansen, Mette Halskov (2004). "The Challenge of Sipsong Panna in the Southwest: Development, Resources, and Power in a Multiethnic China". Governing China's Multiethnic Frontiers. University of Washington Press. pp. 53–83.
- Sethakul, Ratanaporn (2000). "Tai Lue of Sipsongpanna and Müang Nan in the Nineteenth-Century". Civility and Savagery: Social Identity in Tai States. Curzon Press.
- 云南省编辑委员会, ed. (2009). 景洪县哈尼族社会调查 [Social Survey of Hani Nationality in Jinghong County]. 哈尼族社会历史调查 [Social History Survey of Hani Nationality]. 民族出版社. ISBN 9787105087754.
