= Avala language =

Austroasiatic language spoken in Yunnan, China

Avala
- Pronunciation: [a˨˩va˨˩la˨˩]
- Native to: China
- Region: Manghuai Yi and Bulang Township, Yun County, Yunnan
- Native speakers: 1 (2014)
- Language family: Austroasiatic: Khasi–Palaungic; Palaungic; Angkuic; Northern Angkuic; Avala

Language codes
- ISO 639-3: –
- Glottolog: None

Avala (pronounced [a˨˩va˨˩la˨˩]) is a near extinct Palaungic language of Yunnan, China.

== Sociolinguistics ==
Avala is an undocumented Austroasiatic moribund in Bangliu village (邦六), Manghuai Yi and Bulang Township, Yun County, Yunnan. As of April 2014 when the language was first recorded by Hsiu (field notes), there was barely native speakers left other than an 83-year-old man named Chen Zhifang (陈织芳) in the entire village cluster who still remembers any words of the language.

Although according to locals in Manghuai Township, more Blangs were reportedly residing in Niuquan 牛圈, Maolan Township 茂兰镇, Yun County, but it is unknown whether they speak Avala (Bulang) or not.

Some Waic speakers along the Myanmar-China border in the south refer to themselves as Avala (/xa³¹ va⁵³ lɒi⁵³/).

== Lexicon ==
| Gloss | Avala |
|---|---|
| autonym | a²¹va²¹la²¹ |
| "cat" | ku³³lu³⁵pɤ²¹ |
| "corn" | tso³³ji²¹, tso³³ʑi²¹ |
| "dog" | tɕaŋ⁵³so²¹ |
| "face" | ŋai³³ |
| "fire" | ŋau²¹, kan⁵³ŋau²¹ |
| "rat" | pʰi²¹sɿ³ |
| "cooked rice" | kʰai³³ |
| "sticky rice" | no³⁵ |
| "stone" | a³³mɯ³³, a³³mɯ²¹ |
| "water" | tɕi⁵³nã²¹(ko²¹tɕi⁵³te²¹) |
