= Bulang people =

Ethnic group of southwest China

Blang (Bulang)
Total population
- 127,345; 1,200 in Thailand

Regions with significant populations
- China: Yunnan; smaller populations in Burma and Thailand

Languages
- Blang, Angkuic languages (U, Man Met, Hu, Va languages,...)

Religion
- Theravada Buddhism, Animism

Related ethnic groups
- Va

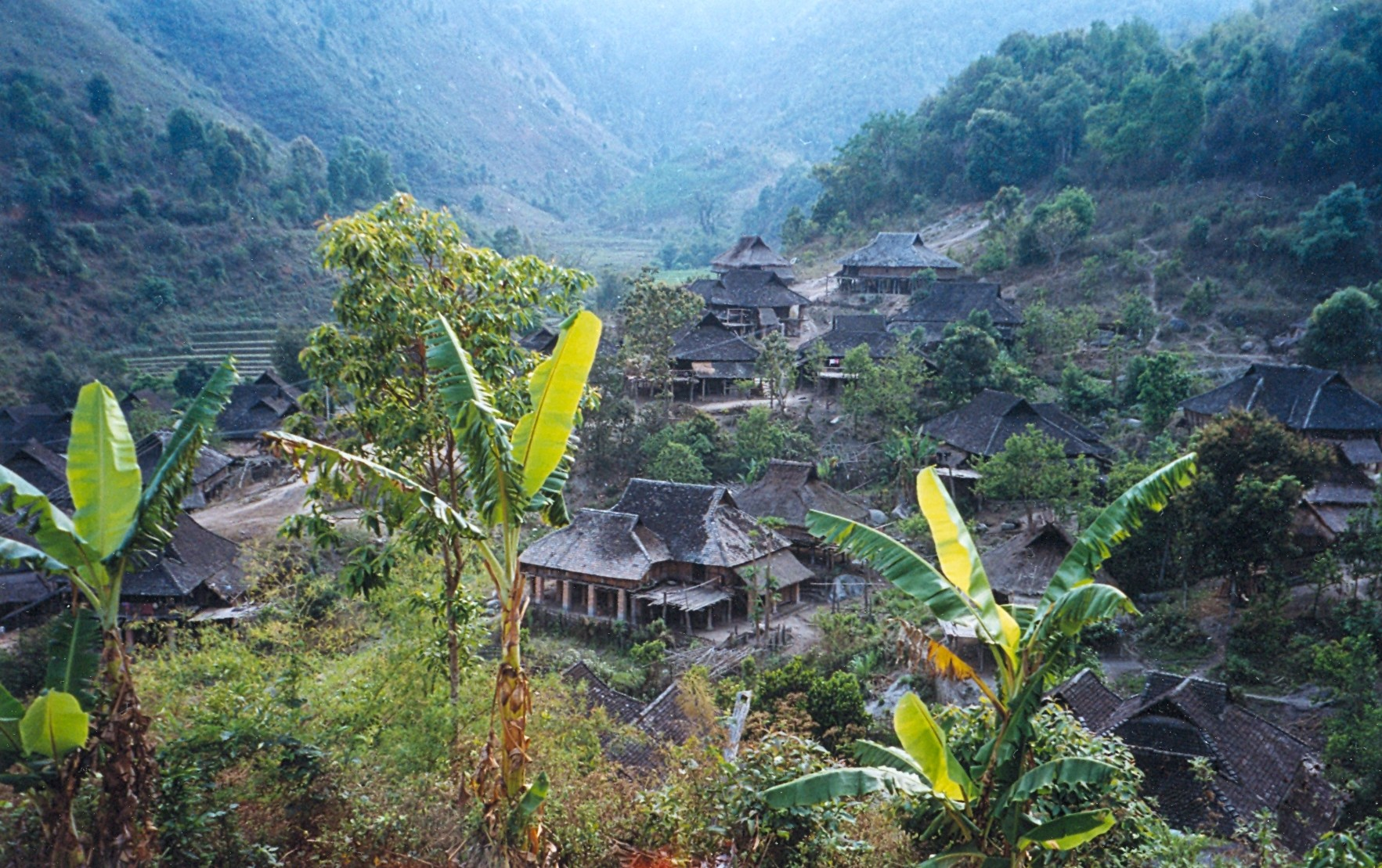
The Blang village of Manpo, Xishuangbanna.

The Blang people (known in China as Bulang; Chinese: 布朗族; pinyin: Bùlǎngzú) or Plang (Thai: ปลัง) are an ethnic group. They form one of the 56 ethnic groups officially recognized by the People's Republic of China. They live in the areas of southern China, and parts of Myanmar and Thailand. There are estimated 1,200 of them in Thailand, living mostly in Chiang Rai province with some emigrated to work as laborers and settle in Nakhon Pathom province and in Greater Bangkok.

== Names ==
Yan & Zhou (2012:147) list the following autonyms of ethnic Bulang in various counties.

- plaŋ31 (布朗): in Xishuangbanna
- a55 vaʔ55 (阿佤): in Shuangjiang and Lancang counties
- ʔu33 tɤr11 (乌德尔): some Bulang of Shuangjiang; means 'mountain people'
- ʔu55 (乌): in Yongde (ʔu˥˩ in Gantang 甘塘), Zhenkang, Shidian (ʔu55 in Hazhai 哈寨), Changning counties
- vaʔ55 (佤): in Mojiang County

Exonyms for Bulang include (Yan & Zhou 2012:147):

- mɔn33 (谟): Dai exonym for the Bulang of Xishuangbanna
- a bø55 (阿别): Hani exonym for the Bulang of Xishuangbanna
- la31 (拉): Dai exonym for the Bulang of Shuangjiang
- kha33 phv53 (卡朴): Lahu exonym for the Bulang
- pa̠ ʔa̠ɯ̠ʔ (巴尔克): Wa exonym for the Bulang of Cangyuan
- Puman (濮曼, 蒲满): Han Chinese exonym for the Bulang

In Thailand, they are known as Plang. According to the database of ethnicities in Thailand by Sirindhorn Anthropology Center, names of the Plangs include:

- Hka Plang: an endonym meaning "upper" or "upper", referring to their habitats in higher altitude, akin to a word for "hill tribe"
- Pang Chung
- Lua: more commonly used by the official records of Thailand, combining Plangs with Lua people, and also sometimes used as an endonym by Plangs
- Palong (ปะหล่อง), a mistaken name formerly used to refer to Plangs in Chiang Rai province

== Languages ==
People classified as Bulang in China speak various Palaungic languages, including Blang and U.

The Blang language belongs to the Palaungic branch of the Austroasiatic language family. Within the Palaungic branch, Blang belongs to the Waic subgroup, which also contains the languages of the Wa and Lawa peoples in addition to Blang. Some Blang also speak the Chinese language and Southwestern Tai languages in addition to Blang. Two systems of writing, based on the Latin alphabet, have been developed: 'Totham' in the Xishuangbanna and 'Tolek' from Dehong and Lincang.

== History ==
Chinese ethnographers identify the Blang as descendants of an ancient tribe known as the "Bo people (China)" (濮), who lived in the Lancang river valley during ancient times. It is believed that these people were one branch of a number of peoples that were collectively known to the ancient Chinese as the Bǎipú (百濮, literally Hundred Pu).

Plangs are believed to have arrived in Thailand in the 1970s, in seeking of job opportunities and escaping oppression from Myanmar.

== Culture ==
Traditionally, the Blang considered teeth blackened by chewing betel nuts a beauty characteristic.

The women usually dress in jackets with black skirts. The men had tattoos in the torso and the stomach. They dressed in wide black trousers and jackets buttoned to the front. Often, they would wear turbans of either white or black fabric.

The houses of the Blang are made out of bamboo and usually consist of two floors. The first floor is designed as a warehouse for food and a stable for livestock animals, such as chickens, whereas the second is designed to house the family. The chimney is located in the center of the house.

The Blang are traditionally divided into small clans, with each clan owning its own land. Every Blang town has its own cemeteries, which are divided by clans. The deceased are buried, with the exception of those who perished due to unnatural causes. In this case, they are cremated.

Bulang are among the earliest known cultivators of tea, with natural tea forest canopy home to unique species & ecosystems as opposed to monoculture fertilizer & pesticide-consuming tea plantations.

== Religion ==
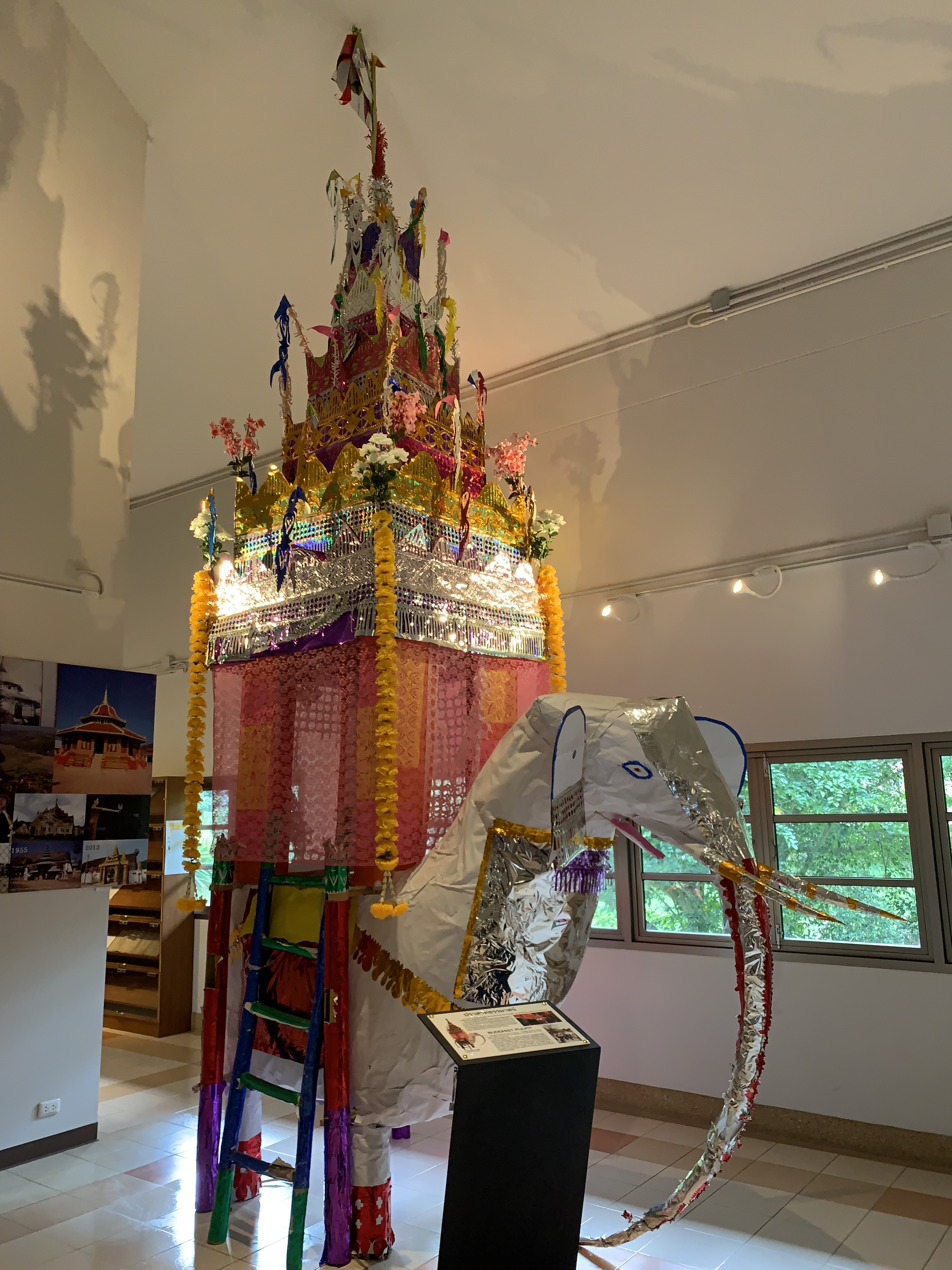
A Buddhist pulpit made of paper from Plang community at Wat Chantharam temple in Thailand, used for monk to sit and preach Vessantara Jataka

The Blang are traditionally associated with animism, ancestor worship, and Theravada Buddhism. Writing in 2011, James Miller described these overlapping traditions as follows:

The Blang, like many nationalities in southwest China, are Theravada Buddhists, but their highly complex religious life is also informed by local beliefs and customs that relate to the traditional ecology, with special attention being paid to rice, water, bees, beeswax, and the various local spirits that are associated with them.

A Christian missionary source describes them as "ardent followers of Theravada Buddhism", and offers as an estimate that 80% of the Bulang are "professing Buddhists", with a lower estimate of 35% being "practicing Buddhists".

In Thailand exists a community of Christian Plangs, who in 2008 founded their own church building in Nakhon Pathom province.

== Distribution ==
=== China ===
The Bulang are distributed in the following villages of Yunnan province (Tao 2012:16-18). Except for the Bulang of Xishuangbanna, the Bulang of most of these counties speak the U language (Svantesson 1991). Locations from Wang & Zhao (2013:173-179) are also included.

- Menghai County (pop. 30,678; 33% of all ethnic Bulang in China)
  - Bulangshan (Bulang Mountain) Township 布朗山乡
  - Bada Township 巴达乡
  - Xiding Township 西定乡
- Shuangjiang County (pop. 12,527; 7.9% of all ethnic Bulang in China)
  - Bangbing Township 邦丙乡 (17 villages)
  - Dawen Township 大文乡 (12 villages)
  - Mengku Township 勐库镇 (3 villages, including Gongnong 公弄村 and Mangna 忙那村)
  - Shahe Township 沙河乡 (3 villages)
- Yongde County (pop. 6,630)
  - Yongkang Township 永康镇: Songgui 送归, Luo'ade 罗阿德, Xiaobaishui 小白水, Luoshuiba 落水坝, Xiamangping 下忙坪, Nanmusuan 南木算, Manghai 忙海, Yatang 鸭塘, Duande 端德村, Mangkuang 忙况村, Reshuitang 热水塘村
  - Xiaomengtong Township 小孟统乡: Dazhai 大寨, Hudong 户董, Hewei 河尾, Landizhai 烂地寨, Banpo 半坡
  - Mengban Township 勐板乡: Ganzhe 甘蔗, Xiazhai 下寨, Dazhai 大寨, Huangguozhai 黄果寨, Datian 大田, Nandongshan 南董山, Xiahuya 下户丫
  - Dashan Township 大山乡: Huwei 户威, Hongshan 红山, Malizhai 麻栗寨, Pahong 怕红
  - Dedang Township 德党乡: Qianshandong 钻山洞村, Mangjiantian 忙见田村
  - Menggong 勐汞乡, Zhaigang 寨岗乡, Daxueshan 大雪山乡 Townships
- Yun County (pop. 5,741)
  - Manghuai Township 忙怀乡: Bangliu 邦六, Gaojingcao 高井槽
  - Manwan Township 漫湾镇: Dapingzhang 大平掌, Manjiu 慢旧, Hetaolin 核桃林村
  - Maolan Township 茂兰乡: Mao'an 茂岸, Zhanglong 掌龙
  - Dazhai Township 大寨乡: Xinhe 新合, Pingzhang 平掌, Dacun 大村, Reshuitang 热水塘
  - Yongbao Township 涌宝乡: Shilong 石龙, Langbashan 浪坝山, Laolu 老鲁
  - Lishu Township 栗树乡: Mangbang 忙蚌, Manlang 慢郎, Xiaobanggan 小邦赶
- Gengma County (pop. 2,957)
  - Manghong Township 芒洪乡: Keqie 科且村, Anya 安雅村
  - Mengyong Township 勐永镇: Mangnuozhai 忙糯寨
  - Gengxuan Township 耿宣镇: Mangfu 芒福, Bakazhai 坝卡寨
  - Xipaishan Township 西排山乡: Dongpo 东坡村, Bankang 班康村
- Lincang County (pop. 450)
  - Pingcun Township 平村乡: Nayu 那玉村
  - Zhangtuo Township 章驮乡
  - Mayidui Township 蚂蚁堆乡 (small population)
  - Quannei Township 圈内乡 (small population)
- Zhenkang County (pop. 452)
  - Muchang Township 木场乡: Dalong 大拢村 (majority of Bulang)
  - Nansan Town 南伞镇: Daoshui 道水村 (small population)
- Fengqing County (pop. 1,276)
  - Dazhai Township 大寨乡: Dalise 大立色村, Qiongyin 琼英村, Pingzhang 平掌村
  - Sanchahe Township 三岔河乡: Shantoutian 山头田村
  - Dasi 大寺乡, Yingpan 营盘乡, Fengshan 凤山乡, Luodang 洛党乡 Townships
- Shidian County (pop. 6,712)
  - Bailang Township 摆榔乡: Hazhai 哈寨, Upper and lower Mulaoyuanzhai 上下木老元寨, Dazhong Jianshan 大中尖山, Yaoguang 姚光
- Changning County (pop. 1,000+)
  - Kasi Township 卡斯乡: Xingu 新谷, Shuanglong 双龙, Yingbaizhai 应百寨, Ergoudi 二沟地
  - Gengga Township 更嘎乡: Baicaolin 百草林, Dachushui 大出水
- Lancang County (pop. 6,500)
  - Huimin Township 惠民乡: Manjing 蛮景, Manhong 蛮洪, Wengji 翁机, Wengwa 翁洼
  - Qianliu Township 谦六乡: Dagang 打岗, Dagun 打滚, Machang 马厂, Danao 大脑
  - Dongwen Township 文东乡: Shuitang 水塘, Jiuku 旧苦, Pasai 帕赛 (in Nagongzhai 那巩寨), Nasai 那赛
- Mojiang County (pop. 1,000+)
  - Jingxing Township 景星乡: Taihe 太和村
- Jinggu County (pop. 1000+)
  - Bi'an Township 碧安乡: Guangmin 光明村
  - Mengban Township 勐班乡: Manhai 蛮海村 ("Lawa" 拉瓦话 speakers)
  - Banpo Township 半坡乡: Bandu 班督村
- Jingdong County
  - Baodian Township 保甸乡
- Simao County
  - Zhulin Township 竹林乡: Cizhulin 茨竹林村, Dacheshu 大车树村

Ethnic Bulang villages are also located in Jinghong City, including in Kunhan Dazhai 昆罕大寨村 in Dahuangba Village 大荒坝村, Dadugang Township 大渡岗乡.

=== Thailand ===
According to the database of ethnicities in Thailand by Sirindhorn Anthropology Center, Plang initially arrived and since have settled in Chiang Rai province especially in Mae Chan and Mae Sai. Some of them emigrated to work as laborers in Greater Bangkok; majority of which settled in Nakhon Pathom province.
