= Hu language =

Palaungic language

Hu
- Kon Keu
- Pronunciation: [xúˀ]
- Native to: China
- Region: Yunnan
- Native speakers: 1,000 (2006)
- Language family: Austroasiatic: Khasi–Palaungic; Palaungic; Angkuic; Hu

Language codes
- ISO 639-3: Either: huo – Hu kkn – Kon Keu (duplicate code)
- Glottolog: huuu1240 Hu konk1268 Kon Keu
- ELP: Hu
- Hu is classified as Critically Endangered by the UNESCO Atlas of the World's Languages in Danger

Hu (Hu pronunciation: [xúˀ], Chinese: 户语; pinyin: Hùyǔ), also Angku or Kon Keu, is a Palaungic language of Xishuangbanna Dai Autonomous Prefecture, Yunnan, China. Its speakers are an unclassified ethnic minority; the Chinese government counts the Angku as members of the Bulang nationality, but the Angkuic languages is not intelligible with Bulang.

== Distribution ==
According to Li (2006:340), there are fewer than 1,000 speakers living on the slopes of the "Kongge" Mountain ("控格山") in Na Huipa village (纳回帕村), Mengyang township (勐养镇), Jinghong (景洪市, a county-level city).

Hu speakers call themselves the xuʔ55, and the local Dai peoples call them the "black people" (黑人), as well as xɔn55 kɤt35, meaning 'surviving souls'. They are also known locally as the Kunge people (昆格人) or Kongge people (控格人).

== Phonology ==
The Hu data presented in the studies was collected from the Xiao Mĕngyăng area in Jǐnghóng County, Yunnan, China.

=== Word structure ===
Hu phonological word strongly tends to be monosyllabic. Disyllabic words are all iambic. There is one trisyllabic form in the data: ʔapalàw "fish". Thus, the maximal structure in Hu is (C_{1}(a(C_{2}))).ˈC_{i}(C_{m})V(C_{f})^{T}.

=== Suprasegmentals (tones) ===
Hu has two tones: high and low. The tonal system reflects historical vowel length contrasts (low < long; high < short) that are no longer phonemic today, with residual length distinctions still perceptible.

Subsequent secondary changes and mergers have introduced distributional asymmetries: syllables with final glottal stops consistently bear high tone; the high vowels /i, u/ take high tone in closed syllables, but low tone only in open syllables and before /-ʁ/.

=== Consonants ===
==== Initials ====
Hu initial consonants
		Labial	Dental/ Alveolar		Palatal	Velar	Uvular	Glottal
		Labial	central	sibilant	Palatal	Velar	Uvular	Glottal
Plosive	plain	p	t		c	k		ʔ
Plosive	aspirated	pʰ	tʰ			kʰ		
Plosive	prenasalized	ᵐp	ⁿt			ᵑk		
Plosive	aspirated prenasalized	ᵐpʰ	ⁿtʰ			ᵑkʰ		
Fricative	voiceless		θ	s		x		
Fricative	prenasalized		ⁿθ	ⁿs				
Fricative	voiced						ʁ	
Nasal	voiceless	m̥	n̥			ŋ̊		
Nasal	voiced	m	n		ɲ	ŋ		
Approximant		w	l		j			

==== Codas ====
Hu codas
	Bilabial	Alveolar	Palatal	Velar	Uvular	Glottal
Plosive	p	t	c	k		ʔ
Fricative					ʁ	
Nasal	m	n		ŋ		
Lateral		l				
Semivowel	w		j			

==== Complex onsets ====
Hu complex onsets found in the files are /pʁ pʰʁ pʰl kʁ kl ŋkh ŋʁ sʁ/.

==== Presyllables ====
Svantesson presents the following presyllables in Hu: /pa ka ʔa pʰa tʰa tsa kʰa pʰl ma na m̩ n̩ ɲ̩ ŋ̩ θa sa sŋ/. The presyllables are always unstressed.

=== Vowels ===
Hu vowels
	Front	Central	Back
Close	i	ɨ	u
Mid	e	ə	o
Open-mid	ɛ		ɔ
Open		a	

== Lexicon ==
=== Pronouns ===
	singular	dual	plural
1st person	ʔɔ́ʔ	ʔàj	ʔéʔ
2nd person	méʔ	pʰáw	pʰéʔ
3rd person	ʔə́n	káw	kéʔ

=== Numerals ===
Comparison of numerals of two Hu varieties with Proto-Palaungic reconstructions by Sidwell (2015).

Gloss	Svantesson	Li Jinfang	Proto-Palaungic
1	ʔàmo	amo³³, ma⁵⁵	*moːh
2	kaʔà	kaa³³	*ləʔaːr
3	kaʔɔ̀j	kaɔi³³	*ləʔɔːj
4	ʔapʰòn	apʰon³³	*poːn
5	paθán	paθaːn³⁵	*pəsan
6	–	n̩tʰɔl³³	*tɔːl
7	–	n̩tʰil⁵⁵	*təpuːl
8	–	tʰaʔ⁵⁵	*taːʔ
9	–	( ŋom³³)	*tiːm
10	–	n̩kit⁵⁵	*kɤːl
100	ʁɔ̀j	–	*prjah
1000	–	–	*sreːŋ

=== Body parts ===
Gloss	Hu	Proto-Palaungic
arm, hand	tʰíʔ	*tiːʔ
belly	katúl	*kəɗɤl
blood-vessel	paθíʔ	*siːʔ
bone	kaʔàŋ	*cəʔaːŋ
breast	tʰút	*tuːs
claw, nail	nθím	*rəmsiːm
ear	nasòk	*ʰjoːk
eye	saŋàj	*ˀŋaːj
foot	cèŋ	*ɟɤːŋ
hair	θúk	*suk
heart	ɕak³³nɔt³³	*nɔːs
liver	katʰɔ̀m	*kətɔːm
nose	katə́ʔ	*kəɗɤːʔ
rib	pʰʁèk	*prɤːk
tail	θatʰáʔ	*sntaʔ
tongue	ntʰàk	*-taːk

=== Fauna ===
Gloss	Hu	Proto-Palaungic
bear	ʔaxèt	*kreːs
bee	pʰaθìʁ	*pəsiɛr
bird	ʔasím	*ciːm
buffalo	tʰʁàk	*traːk
cat	ʔaŋɛ̀w	*ʔᵊɲɛw
crab	maʁíŋ	*mrɤɲ
dog	sɔ́ʔ	*cɔːʔ
fowl	ʔìʁ	*ʔiɛr
horse	maʁáŋ	*mraŋ
louse	nsíʔ	*ciːʔ
monkey	ʔaʔɔ̀	*sʋaʔ
pig	lèk	*-leːk
sambar deer	pʰòt	*poːs
termite/ant	maʁúɲ	*ŋruːɲ
tiger	kawaːi³³	*rəʋaːj
turtle	pu³¹ɣut⁵⁵	*ruːs

=== Flora & nature ===
Gloss	Hu	Proto-Palaungic
black	laŋ⁵⁵	*laŋ
bamboo	θɨ́ŋ	*ʰrɤŋ
blue (<green)	tsaŋàl	*cəŋaːl
earth	katʰéʔ	*kəteːʔ
flower	ʁàŋ	*raːŋ
forest	pʁíʔ	briːʔ
fruit	pʰléʔ	*pleeʔ
leaf	láʔ	*hlaʔ
Mekong	xɔ̀ŋ	*rɔːŋ
moon	kʰìʁ	*kiɛr
rain	saléʔ	*cleːʔ
red	sʁéŋ	*rooŋ
rice grain	ŋkʰóʔ	*rəŋkoːʔ
rice (cooked)	ʔúp	*ʔuup
salt	palúʔ	bluːʔ
sand	nθàc	-saːc
yellow	səʔ ɣɔŋ³³	*rmiit

=== Tools and concepts ===
Gloss	Hu	Proto-Palaungic
axe	mɔ̀	*ˀmɤːj
bow, crossbow	ʔàk	*ʔaːk
charcoal	kʰasét	*kətsas
comb	nn̥àt	*cənaːs
dry field	mà	*ˀmaːr
house	kàŋ	*gaaŋ
iron	kaŋáŋ	*rəŋɔ/aŋ
left side	véʔ	*-ʋeʔ
mortar	mpʰál	*pal
pestle	ŋʁíʔ	*-reʔ
right side	ʔaθɛ́m	*stam
wall	n̩tʰeŋ³³	*ti(ː)ŋ
weave	tʰàɲ	*taːɲ
wet field	kʰúŋ	*kuːŋ
