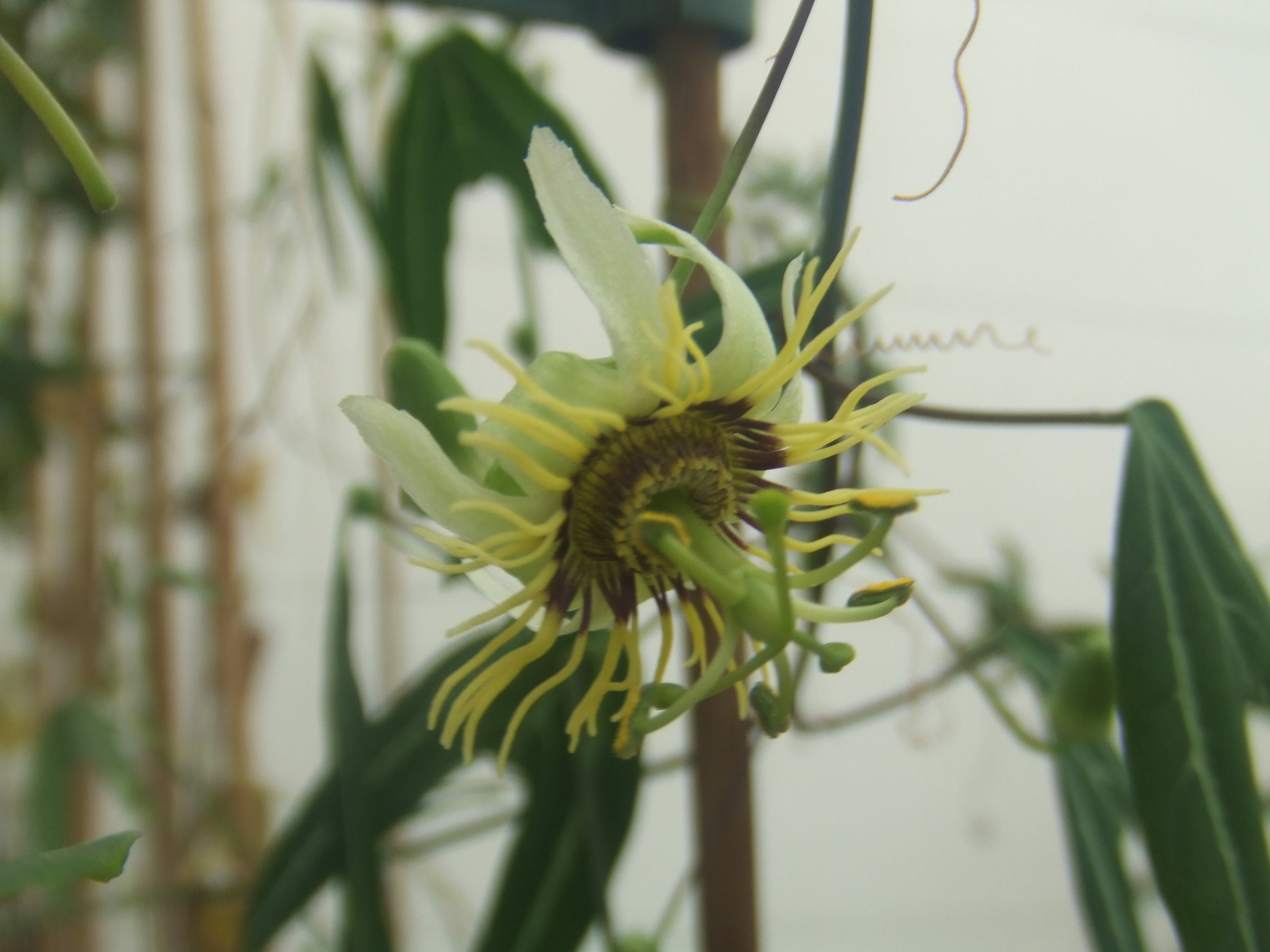

Scientific classification
- Kingdom: Plantae
- Clade: Tracheophytes
- Clade: Angiosperms
- Clade: Eudicots
- Clade: Rosids
- Order: Malpighiales
- Family: Passifloraceae
- Genus: Passiflora
- Species: P. xishuangbannaensis

Binomial name
- Passiflora xishuangbannaensis Krosnick

= Passiflora xishuangbannaensis =

Species of flowering plant

Passiflora xishuangbannaensis is a passion flower vine in the genus Passiflora that is endemic to Yunnan, China. It is a glabrous, 1–3 metres (3–10 ft) long vine with strongly two-lobed leaves. The green and yellow flowers are 3.2–3.8 centimetres (1 1/3–1 1/2 in) in diameter when fully open, one or two flowers per node. It grows in wet and open sunny or shaded areas at 1,200 metres (3,900 ft). It was described in 2005 by Shawn Elizabeth Krosnick.
