= Angkuic languages =

Subgroup of the Austroasiatic language family

Angkuic
- Geographic distribution: China, Burma
- Ethnicity: Blang people in China and Loi people in Myanmar (Shan and Mongla)
- Linguistic classification: Austroasiatic: Khasi–Palaungic; Palaungic; Angkuic

Language codes
- Glottolog: angk1246

The Angkuic languages are a subgroup of the Palaungic languages, spoken in Yunnan province, China and Shan State, Burma.

== Characteristics ==
The Angkuic languages are affected by a diagnostic "Germanic-type" stop onset shift that synchronically devoiced all voiced stop onsets and made voiceless stop onsets become aspirated.

All Angkuic lects are tonal, but their tonogenesis are not related to VOT, but rather involved the transphonologization of vowel length contrast.

Proto-Palaungic final nasals became stop codas (*-ŋ > -k > -ʕ, *-m > -p, *-n > -t) in Northern Angkuic languages.

== Languages ==
- U (P'uman)
- Hu (Kongge, Kun'ge, Kon Keu)
- Man Met (Kemie)
- Mok
- Muak Sa-aak
- Va
  - Northern Va
  - Southern Va
- Mong Lue (Tai Loi) ?
- Avala
- Auva
- Ghu (autonym ɣu⁵⁵)
- Dagun

== Classification ==
Andrew Hsiu (2015) proposes the following tentative classification scheme for the Angkuic languages.

Angkuic

- Eastern (Va)
  - Northern Va
  - Southern Va
- Northern (U)
  - Xiaoheijiang U (Alva, Auva, U of Shuangjiang)
  - Northeastern U (P’uman, Avala)
  - Northwestern U
- Southern (?)
  - Man Met
  - Hu
  - Muak Sa-aak
  - Angku (?)
- Dagun (?)

Hsiu (2015) suggests that the Angkuic languages originated in the Mekong River valley in the Sipsongpanna area, and subsequently dispersed upstream into western and central Yunnan.

== Lexical innovations ==
Hsiu (2015) lists the following lexical innovations in each Angkuic branch. Proto-Palaungic reconstructions are from Sidwell (2015).

	'to eat'	'three'	'tooth'	'knife'
Proto-Northern Angkuic	*naʔ	*ʔuaj	*hraŋ	*sak
Proto-Eastern Angkuic	*pra	*kuej	*xaŋ	*jət
Proto-Southern Angkuic	*kʰaːj	*-ɔj	*kʰɛŋ	*wac
Proto-Palaungic	-	*ləʔɔːj	*sraːŋ	*ʋaːc; *ʋiɛk

== References and notes ==
- Hsiu, Andrew (2017). "The Angkuic languages: a preliminary survey [Dataset]. Zenodo. 6th International Conference on Austroasiatic Linguistics (ICAAL 6), Siem Reap, Cambodia". Journal of the Southeast Asian Linguistics Society. University of Hawai'i Press. doi:10.5281/zenodo.1127808.
- Sidwell, Paul. 2009. Classifying the Austroasiatic languages: history and state of the art. LINCOM studies in Asian linguistics, 76. Munich: Lincom Europa.
- Sidwell, Paul (2015). The Palaungic Languages: Classification, Reconstruction and Comparative Lexicon. München: Lincom Europa.. München: Lincom Europa.

== Bibliography ==
Sources with lexical data of Angkuic languages

- Chen Guoqing [陈国庆]. 2005. A study of Kemie [克蔑语研究]. Beijing: Ethnic Publishing House [民族出版社].
- Hall, Elizabeth. 2010. A Phonology of Muak Sa-aak. M.A. thesis. Chiang Mai, Thailand: Payap University.
- Li Daoyong [李道勇], et al. (eds). 1986. A sketch of the Bulang language [布朗语简志]. Beijing: Ethnic Publishing House [民族出版社].
- Li Jinfang [李锦芳]. 2006. Studies on endangered languages in the Southwest China [西南地区濒危语言调查研究]. Beijing: Minzu University [中央民族大学出版社].
- Luce, Gordon. n.d. Field notes. m.s. Available online at http://sealang.net/archives/luce/
- Luce, Gordon. n.d. Comparative lexicon For Austroasiatic list: Wa - Danang Palaung - En - Amok - Möng-Lwe-Hkamuk - Angku - Wa Kut - Son. m.s.
- Luce, Gordon. n.d. Comparative lexicon: P'uman - Wa - La - Vü - Tailoi - Angku - Hkamuk - K'amu - Khmous - Lamet - P'eng (T'eng) - Nañang (Wa-Khmuk-Lemet Group (i)). m.s.
- Simao Prefecture Ethnic Minority Affairs Bureau [思茂行署民族事务委员会编]. 1991. A study of the Bulang people [布朗族研究]. Kunming: Yunnan People's Press [云南人民出版社]. ISBN 7-222-00803-9
- Svantesson, Jan-Olof. 1988. "U." In Linguistics of the Tibeto-Burman Area, 11, no. 1: 64-133.
- Svantesson, Jan-Olof. 1991. "Hu - a Language with Unorthodox Tonogenesis." In Austroasiatic Languages, Essays in honour of H. L. Shorto, edited by Jeremy H.C.S. Davidson. 67-80. School of Oriental and African Studies, University of London.
- Wang Xingzhong [王兴中] & Zhao Weihua [赵卫华]. 2013. Geography and multilingualism in Lincang [临沧地理与双语使用]. Kunming: Yunnan People's Press [云南人民出版社]. ISBN 978-7-222-08581-7
- Yan Qixiang [颜其香] & Zhou Zhizhi [周植志]. 2012. Mon-Khmer languages of China and the Austroasiatic family [中国孟高棉语族语言与南亚语系]. Beijing: Social Sciences Academy Press Social Sciences Literature Press.

Gazetteers and other Chinese government sources with lexical data

- Nanjian County Gazetteer Commission [南涧县志编纂委员会编] (ed). 1993. Nanjian County Gazetteer [南涧彝族自治县志]. Chengdu: Sichuan Reference Press [四川辞书出版社].
- Na Ruzhen [納汝珍], et al. (eds). 1994. Zhenkang County Ethnic Gazetteer [镇康县民族志]. Kunming: Yunnan People's Press [云南民族出版社].
- Simao Prefecture Ethnic Minority Affairs Bureau [思茅行暑民族事务委员会] (ed). 1990. A study of the Bulang people [布朗族研究]. m.s.
- Simao Prefecture Ethnic Minority Affairs Bureau [思茅行暑民族事务委员会] (ed). 1991. A study of the Bulang people [布朗族研究]. Kunming: Yunnan People's Press [云南人民出版社]. ISBN 7222008039
- Xiao Dehua [萧德虎], et al. (eds). 1992. Zhenkang County Gazetteer [镇康县志]. 1992. Chengdu: Sichuan People's Press [四川民族出版社].
- Yunnan Gazetteer Commission [云南省地方志编纂委员会] (ed). 1998. Yunnan Provincial Gazetteer, Vol. 59: Minority Languages Orthographies Gazetteer [云南省志. 卷五十九, 少数民族语言文字志]. Kunming: Yunnan People's Press [云南人民出版社].

Geographic information (village locations)

- Tao Yuming [陶玉明]. 2012. The Bulang people of China [中国布朗族]. Yinchuan: Ningxia People's Press [宁夏人民出版社].
