= Menghai County =

Menghai County 勐海县 · ᦵᦙᦲᧂ ᦣᦻ ᦶᦉᧃᧈ
- County
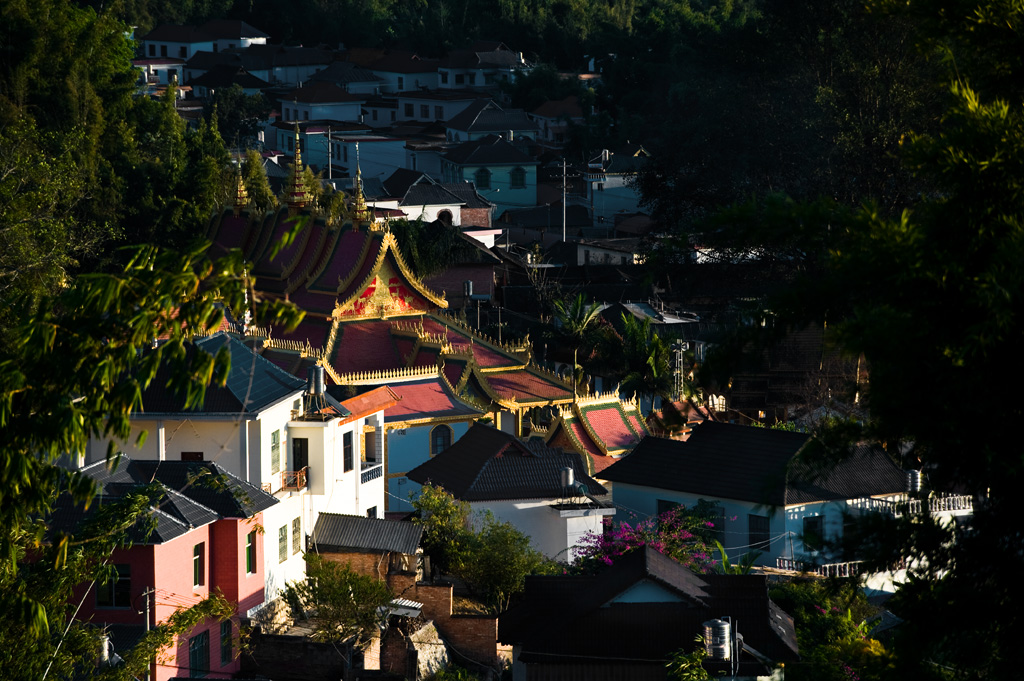

- Location of Menghai County (red) and Xishuangbanna Prefecture (pink) and Yunnan province

- Location of the seat in Yunnan
- Coordinates: 21°58′N 100°28′E
- Country: China
- Province: Yunnan
- Autonomous prefecture: Xishuangbanna
- GB/T 2260 CODE: 532822
- County seat: Menghai

Area
  - Total: 5,511 km^{2} (2,128 sq mi)

Population (2020 census)
  - Total: 353,720
  - Density: 64.18/km^{2} (166.2/sq mi)
- Time zone: UTC+8 (China Standard Time)
- Postal code: 666200
- Area code: 0691
- Climate: Cwa
- Website: www.ynmh.gov.cn
- ^{1}Yunnan Statistics Bureau^{2}Xishuangbanna Gov.^{3}Yunnan Portal

Menghai County (Chinese: 勐海县; pinyin: Měnghǎi Xiàn; Tai Lue: ᦵᦙᦲᧂ ᦣᦻ ᦶᦉᧃᧈ Meng Haai; Lao: ເມືອງຮາຍ) is a county under the jurisdiction of Xishuangbanna Dai Autonomous Prefecture, in the far south of Yunnan, China, bordering Burma's Shan State to the south and west. Meng is a variation of Mueang.

== Geography ==
Menghai County is in the west of Xishuangbanna Dai Autonomous Prefecture in southwestern Yunnan. It borders Jinghong to the east, Simao District to the northeast, Lancang County to the northwest and Myanmar (Shan State) to the south and west.

== Ethnic groups ==
In and around Menghai County, ethnic Hani subgroups include:

- Jiuwei (鸠为) (Dai exonym: Buli 布里; large population): villages include Nanzhong 南中寨 of Mengjing 勐景, Longnapa 笼那帕寨 of Damenglong 大勐笼, and Baiya 拜牙村 Menggun 勐滚, Menghai County.
- Jizuo (吉坐) (small population): villages include Mengbozhai 勐波寨 of Menghan 勐罕村
- Muda (木达) (also locally known as the Nanlin 南林)

== Administrative divisions ==
Menghai County has 6 towns, 2 townships and 3 ethnic townships.

6 towns

- Menghai (勐海镇)
- Daluo (打洛镇)
- Menghun (勐混镇)
- Mengzhe (勐遮镇)
- Mengman (勐满镇)
- Meng'a (勐阿镇)

2 townships

- Mengsong (勐宋乡)
- Mengwang (勐往乡)

3 ethnic townships

- Gelanghe Hani (格朗和哈尼族乡)
- Bulangshan Bulang (布朗山布朗族乡)
- Xiding Hani and Bulang (西定哈尼族布朗族乡)

== Transport ==
- Nearest airport is Xishuangbanna Gasa
- China National Highway 214
- Asian Highway Network AH3 (alternative route) with a border crossing into Myanmar at Daluo. The town on the Myanmar side of the border is Mong La where the road continues to Kengtung

== Tea ==
Menghai is famous for its Bulang tea, a type of pu-erh grown in the Bulang Mountain area and its environs. Famous plantations include Laoman'e, Xinbanzhang and Laobanzhang.

== Climate ==
Climate data for Menghai, elevation 1,223 m (4,012 ft), (1991–2020 normals, extremes 1981–present)
Month	Jan	Feb	Mar	Apr	May	Jun	Jul	Aug	Sep	Oct	Nov	Dec	Year
Record high °C (°F)	28.5 (83.3)	31.2 (88.2)	33.1 (91.6)	35.0 (95.0)	35.2 (95.4)	33.2 (91.8)	32.1 (89.8)	32.3 (90.1)	31.7 (89.1)	30.6 (87.1)	30.1 (86.2)	27.5 (81.5)	35.2 (95.4)
Mean daily maximum °C (°F)	22.8 (73.0)	25.1 (77.2)	28.1 (82.6)	29.8 (85.6)	29.2 (84.6)	28.3 (82.9)	27.3 (81.1)	27.5 (81.5)	27.4 (81.3)	25.9 (78.6)	24.0 (75.2)	21.8 (71.2)	26.4 (79.6)
Daily mean °C (°F)	14.7 (58.5)	16.3 (61.3)	19.4 (66.9)	22.1 (71.8)	23.5 (74.3)	24.1 (75.4)	23.7 (74.7)	23.6 (74.5)	22.9 (73.2)	21.0 (69.8)	17.9 (64.2)	15.0 (59.0)	20.3 (68.6)
Mean daily minimum °C (°F)	6.7 (44.1)	7.5 (45.5)	10.7 (51.3)	14.5 (58.1)	17.8 (64.0)	20.0 (68.0)	20.1 (68.2)	19.7 (67.5)	18.4 (65.1)	16.2 (61.2)	11.8 (53.2)	8.3 (46.9)	14.3 (57.8)
Record low °C (°F)	−1.0 (30.2)	0.2 (32.4)	1.2 (34.2)	5.7 (42.3)	11.0 (51.8)	16.0 (60.8)	16.5 (61.7)	14.5 (58.1)	10.8 (51.4)	7.0 (44.6)	1.3 (34.3)	−3.5 (25.7)	−3.5 (25.7)
Average precipitation mm (inches)	20.7 (0.81)	11.7 (0.46)	28.4 (1.12)	58.1 (2.29)	149.1 (5.87)	187.4 (7.38)	278.8 (10.98)	268.9 (10.59)	148.8 (5.86)	112.5 (4.43)	50.3 (1.98)	26.2 (1.03)	1,340.9 (52.8)
Average precipitation days (≥ 0.1 mm)	4.6	3.1	4.7	10.3	17.9	23.1	26.2	25.0	19.1	15.6	8.3	6.3	164.2
Average relative humidity (%)	77	69	64	68	75	82	86	86	86	85	84	83	79
Mean monthly sunshine hours	220.5	227.0	229.1	218.6	193.8	122.9	87.8	106.3	125.2	132.7	162.9	175.9	2,002.7
Percentage possible sunshine	65	70	61	57	47	30	21	27	34	37	49	53	46
Source: China Meteorological Administration all-time November record high
