= U language =

Austroasiatic language spoken in Yunnan, China

U
- Pouma
- Pronunciation: [ʔu˥]
- Region: China
- Native speakers: (40,000 cited 2000)
- Language family: Austroasiatic: Khasi–Palaungic; Palaungic; Angkuic; Northern Angkuic; U

Language codes
- ISO 639-3: uuu
- Glottolog: uuuu1243
- ELP: U
- U is classified as Definitely Endangered by the UNESCO Atlas of the World's Languages in Danger

The U language (autonym: [ʔu˥] 'human being'), or P'uman (Chinese: 濮满), is spoken by 40,000 people in the Yunnan Province of China and possibly Myanmar. It is classified as an Austroasiatic language in the Palaungic branch. In China, U speakers are classified as ethnic Bulang.

U speakers have no ethnonym and refer to themselves as ʔú ʔè ('our people').

== Locations ==
U is spoken in Shuangjiang County of Yunnan and other nearby counties.

- Wang & Chen (1981) covers the dialect of Pengpan 碰拚, Dafengshan Township 大凤山乡, Shuangjiang County.
- Zhou & Yan (1983) covers the dialect of Pangpin 胖品, Yongge Township 永革乡, Shuangjiang County.
- Yan & Zhou (2012) cover U of Gantang 甘塘, Yongde County as well as U of Pangpin 胖品.
- Svantesson (1991:67) documents the U dialect of Pã Xɛp (Bangxie, 邦协), Shahe Township 沙河乡, Shuangjiang County.

There are two main dialects of U in Shuangjiang County: one spoken in Gongnong (公弄, now part of Mengku Town, 勐库镇) and one spoken in Bangbing (邦丙) and Dawen Mangga (大文乡忙嘎); the Dawen dialect is reportedly mutually intelligible with that of Shidian County (Shuangjiang County Ethnic Gazetteer 1995:160).

Avala (autonym: a21 va21 la21) is spoken in Bangliu (邦六), Manghuai Township (芒怀乡), Yun County (云县), Yunnan, China.

== Phonology ==
U has four tones, high, low, rising, falling, which developed from vowel length and the nature of final consonants.

Consonants
		Labial	Dental	Palatal	Velar	Uvular	Laryngeal
Plosive	plain	p	t	c	k	q	ʔ
Plosive	aspirated	pʰ	tʰ	cʰ	kʰ	qʰ	
Affricate	plain		ts				
Affricate	aspirated		tsʰ				
Fricative	voiceless	f	s			χ	h
Fricative	voiced	v					ʕ
Nasal		m	n	ɲ	ŋ		
Lateral			l				
Approximant		w		j			

- /ʕ/ only occurs in coda position. It may be heard as, first, similar to [ʕ] in Cairo Arabic. Eg. [suʕ˥] "hair". In the second case, it is pronounced as an [ɑ]-like offglide accompanied by a [h]-like sound. Eg. [suɑ̯h˥] "ibid".

Vowels
	Front	Central	Back
High	i	ɨ	u
Mid	e	ə	o
Low	ɛ	a	ɔ

== Typology ==
The Angkuic languages sit on the typological extreme end of the Mainland Southeast Asia linguistic area. As a result, U is morphologically isolating, with head-first syntactic structure and subject–verb–object word order in clausal structure.

ʔò ŋê líʕ
I kill pig
'I killed a pig.'

tsɨ̀ ʔò mə̀ ʔaj tìt
name I COP Ay Tit
'My name is Ay Tit.'

== Lexicon ==
=== Pronouns ===
	singular	dual	plural
1st person	ʔò	ʔǎj	ʔè
2nd person	mî	pʰâj	pʰé
3rd person	ʔə̀t	kǎj	ké

=== Numerals ===
Comparison of U (Pɑ᷉ χɛ̀p (邦协) and Gantang (甘塘) dialects) numerals with Proto-Palaungic reconstructions by Sidwell (2015).

Gloss	Pɑ᷉ χɛ̀p U	Gantang U	proto-Palaungic
1	mò	mu³³	*moːh
2	ʔá	ʔa⁵¹	*ləʔaːr
3	wáj	ʔoi⁵¹	*ləʔɔːj
4	pʰón	pʰon⁵¹	*poːn
5	sàt	sat⁵⁵	*pəsan
6	ntʰò	tʰo³¹	*tɔːl
7	mpʰùn	pʰun³¹	*təpuːl
8	tʰà	tʰa⁵⁵	*taːʔ
9	tʰìp	tʰip⁵⁵	*tiːm
10	tsʰò	tʂʰo⁵¹	*kɤːl
100	m̀.tsʰâ	pʰia³³	*prjah
1000	–	tɕʰen³	*sreːŋ

=== Body parts ===
Gloss	U	proto-Palaungic
arm, hand	tʰí	*tiːʔ
belly	tû	*kəɗɤl
bone	saʔáɑ̃	*cəʔaːŋ
breast	pú	*ɓuːʔ
ear	sǔʕ	*ʰjoːk
eye	ŋâj	*ˀŋaːj
foot	kíɑ̃	*ɟɤːŋ
hair	súʕ	*suk
liver	tsʰɔm	*kətɔːm
nose	tì	*kəɗɤːʔ
tongue	ntʰǎʕ	*-taːk

=== Fauna ===
Gloss	U	proto-Palaungic
buffalo	qhǎʕ	*traːk
bear	χí	*kreːs
bird	pacʰìp	*ciːm
cat	mɛ̂m	*miɛw
crab	tʰám	*kətaːm
dog	sò	*cɔːʔ
fowl	jɛ́	*ʔiɛr
goat	pè	*bɛʔ
horse	ŋqʰàʕ	*mraŋ
louse	ncʰí	*ciːʔ
pig	líʕ	*-leːk
sambar deer	jǎʕ	*tjaːk
termite	ŋqʰùt	*ŋruːɲ
tiger	ʔavâj	*rəʋaːj

=== Flora & nature ===
Gloss	U	proto-Palaungic
black	làʕ	*laŋ
bamboo	χɨ̀ʕ	*ʰrɤŋ
conifer	sì kí	*-geʔ
earth	tʰè	*kəteːʔ
flower	χâɑ̃	*raːŋ
fruit	ŋχí	*pleeʔ
green	saŋɛ̂n	*cəŋaːl
leaf	là sì	*hlaʔ
millet	kʰoi⁵⁵	*skɔɔj
rain	salè	*cleːʔ
red	saŋ³³	*rooŋ
rice grain	ŋkʰù	*rəŋkoːʔ
salt	qʰìʕ	pleːŋ
sky	qú	bluːʔ
yellow	lɨ́ɑ̃	*rmiit

=== Tools and concepts ===
Gloss	U	proto-Palaungic
axe	mmè	*ˀmɤːj
bow, crossbow	ʔǎʕ	*ʔaːk
bran, chaff, husk	ŋkʰám	*səkaːm
bridge (<ladder, stair)	tʰúʕ	*tɔ(ː)ŋ
charcoal	sé	*kətsas
clothes	sapè	*-ɓeʔ
comb	sanà	*cənaːs
drum	satʰùʕ	*cətuŋ
grave	mút	*-muːc
house	káɑ̃	*gaaŋ
human being, person	ʔú	*ʔuːʔ
iron	ʔaŋàʕ	*rəŋɔ/aŋ
left side	fè	*-ʋeʔ
mortar	pʰaw	*pal
pestle	ŋqhì	*-reʔ
wall	ntʰìʕ	*ti(ː)ŋ
war	nàn	*naːɲ
weave	tʰán	*taːɲ
