= Man Met language =

Austroasiatic language spoken in Yunnan, China

Man Met
- Kemie
- Native to: China
- Region: Southwest Yunnan
- Native speakers: (900 cited 1990)
- Language family: Austroasiatic: Khasi–Palaungic; Palaungic; Angkuic; Man Met

Language codes
- ISO 639-3: Either: mml – Man Met kfj – Kemie (duplicate code)
- Glottolog: kemi1240 Kemiehua manm1238 Man Met
- ELP: Man Met

Man Met, or Kemie (Chinese: 克蔑话 Kemiehua), is a poorly classified Austroasiatic language spoken by about 1,000 people in Jinghong County, Xishuangbanna, China. It is classified as an Angkuic language by Paul Sidwell (2010). It may be or Mangic according to Li Yunbing (2005), or Palaungic. Like most other Austroasiatic languages, Kemie has subject–verb–object (SVO) word order.

Autonyms include man13 met53 (曼咪), kʰɤ31 met53 (克蔑), and kʰɤ31 miŋ33 (克敏), or khaʔ33 min33.

== Distribution ==
Kemie is spoken in the following villages by just over 1,000 people.

- Jinghong Township (景洪镇)
  - Xiaomanmi (小曼咪村, 58 households, 256 persons)
  - Damanmi (大曼咪村, 53 households, 234 persons)
  - Jiangtou Manmi (江头曼咪村, 33 households, 124 persons)
- Manmi (曼咪村, man13 met53) of Gadong Township (嘎东乡, 51 households, 228 persons)
- Sanjia (三家村) of Mengyang Township (勐养镇, 46 households, 200 persons)

== Phonology ==
The data for Man Met phonology was recorded by Chen (2005) from native speakers of the Xiao Mammi village (小曼咪村), Jinghong County, Xishuangbanna, Yunnan.

=== Word structure ===
Most lexemes are monosyllabic, though disyllabic compound words are pretty common. Stress falls on the final syllable in disyllables. The word structure can be described as (ʔa/m).ˈC_{i}V(C_{f})^{T}. The presyllable /m-/ is a syllabic [m̩].

=== Suprasegmentals (tones) ===
Man Met features seven tones, though some one them have limited distributions.

Tone value	Note	Example
11	Predominantly found in Tai loans; has final /ʔ/ or creak.	kʰɔn³¹ lɔ¹¹ "tadpole"
13	Infrequent, predominately with historically short /a, ɤ/ nuclei.	aɕim¹³ "bird"
31	Predominates in historically long non-high nuclei.	atɕɔh³¹ "ants"
33	Only two examples were attested.	hɔt³³ "to end"
35	Predominates with historically approximant and palatal codas.	sɤm³⁵ "to plant"
53	Restricted to checked and short syllables only.	pɛʔ⁵³ "goat, sheep"
55	Infrequent, occurs with /i, u/ with nasal codas. Varies to 35~13 in connected speech.	fa⁵⁵ "wide"

=== Consonants ===
==== Onsets ====
Man Met onsets
		Labial	Alveolar	Alveopalatal	Velar	Glottal
Plosive	plain	p	t		k	ʔ
Plosive	aspirated	pʰ	tʰ		kʰ	
Fricative	voiceless	f	s	ɕ		h
Fricative	voiced	v			ɣ	
Affricate			t͡s	t͡ɕ		
Nasal		m	n	ȵ	ŋ	
Lateral			l			

In uninterrupted speech, /t͡s/ may be confused with /t͡ɕ/, according to report by Chen (2005). /s/ tends to realize as [t͡sʰ] in Han loan words. The language has the following complex onsets: /pr pw pʰr pʰw (tr) kr kw kʰr kʰw/.

==== Codas ====
Codas
	Bilabial	Alveolar	Palatal	Velar	Glottal
Plosive	p	t		k	ʔ
Nasal	m	n		ŋ	
Semivowel	u̯		i̯		

=== Vowels ===
Man Met monophthongs
	Front	Central	Back
Close	i	ɯ	u
Mid	e	ɤ	o
Open	ɛ	ă, a	ɔ

== Lexicon ==
=== Pronouns ===
	singular	dual	plural
1st person	ɔʔ⁵³	ai³⁵ au³¹ iʔ⁵³	ɛʔ⁵³
2nd person	meʔ⁵³	pʰau³⁵	pʰɛʔ⁵³
3rd person	ɤn³⁵	kau³⁵	kɛʔ⁵³

=== Numerals ===
Gloss	ManMet	Proto-Palaungic
1	m̩.ɔ³¹	*moːh
2	au³¹	*ləʔaːr
3	ɔi³¹	*ləʔɔːj
4	pʰon³¹	*poːn
5	ɕɛn⁵⁵	*pəsan
6	tʰɔn³¹	*tɔːl
7	–	*təpuːl
8	–	*taːʔ
9	–	*tiːm
10	–	*kɤːl
100	–	*prjah
1000	–	*sreːŋ

=== Body parts ===
Gloss	Man Met	Proto-Palaungic
arm, hand	tʰiʔ⁵³	*tiːʔ
belly	tɤn¹³	*kəɗɤl
bone	aŋ³¹	*cəʔaːŋ
breast	m̩tʰuh³³	*tuːs
ear	lăʔ⁵³sok³³	*ʰjoːk
eye	săk⁵³ŋai³¹	*ˀŋaːj
foot	tɕeŋ³¹	*ɟɤːŋ
hair	suk⁵³kʰiŋ⁵⁵	*suk
heart	sak⁵³nɔh³³	*nɔːs
liver	tʰɔm³¹	*kətɔːm
nose	tʰuʔ⁵³tɤʔ⁵³	*kəɗɤːʔ
tail	tʰăʔ⁵³	*sntaʔ
tongue	tʰak³³	*-taːk
vein	sai³¹ in⁵⁵	*siːʔ

=== Fauna ===
Gloss	Man Met	Proto-Palaungic
ant	a tɕɔh³¹	*cɔːʔ
bear	a feh³³	*kreːs
bee	siau³¹	*pəsiɛr
bird	a ɕim¹³	*ciːm
buffalo	fak³³	*traːk
cat	a ŋiau³¹	*ʔᵊɲɛw
civet	a ɕɛn¹³	*car
dog	sɔʔ⁵³	*cɔːʔ
goat	pɛʔ⁵³	*bɛʔ
eagle	a kʰaŋ³¹	*klaːŋ
fowl	iau³¹	*ʔiɛr
horse	păŋ⁵⁵	*mraŋ
louse	siʔ⁵³	*ciːʔ
monkey	făʔ⁵³	*sʋaʔ
pig	lek³³	*-leːk
termite	a ɣun¹³	*ŋruːɲ
tiger/leopard	a vai³¹	*rəʋaːj

=== Flora & nature ===
Gloss	Man Met	Proto-Palaungic
black	laŋ⁵⁵	*laŋ
bamboo	hɤŋ⁵⁵	*ʰrɤŋ
earth	pʰɤn³⁵tʰɛʔ⁵³	*kəteːʔ
flower	haŋ³¹	*raːŋ
fruit	pʰeʔ⁵³	*pleeʔ
leaf	lăʔ⁵³	*hlaʔ
moon	a kʰɛn³¹	*kiɛr
pumpkin	a pʰin¹³	*-piːr
rain	tɕuŋ⁵⁵	*ɟuŋ
red	hɛŋ⁵⁵	*rooŋ
rice grain	a kʰoʔ⁵³, kʰău¹³	*rəŋkoːʔ
rice (cooked)	up⁵³	*ʔuup
rice (tree)	ŋɔʔ⁵³	*sŋɔːʔ
rice chaff	kʰam³¹	*səkaːm
salt	puʔ⁵³	bluːʔ
sand	a sat³³	-saːc
taro	a hoʔ⁵³	səroːɁ
yellow	hoŋ³¹	*rmiit

=== Tools and concepts ===
Gloss	Man Met	Proto-Palaungic
axe	mɤi³¹	*ˀmɤːj
bow, crossbow	a ak⁵³	*ʔaːk
chair	pʰaŋ³¹	*paːŋ
charcoal	sɛh⁵³	*kətsas
comb	nah³³	*cənaːs
copper	tɔŋ³¹	*dɔːŋ
house	ȵăʔ⁵³	*ɲaːʔ
iron	a ŋaŋ³⁵	*rəŋɔ/aŋ
knife	sɔ³⁵	*təcɔːs
left side	vɛʔ⁵³	*-ʋeʔ
paddy	kʰuŋ³⁵	*kuːŋ
pestle	kʰɔk⁵³ pʰan³⁵ (< mortar)	*pal
wall	a fiŋ⁵⁵	*ti(ː)ŋ
weave	tʰan⁵³	*taːɲ
