= Muak language =

Angkuic language spoken in Burma and China

Muak Sa-aak
- Region: Burma, China
- Native speakers: 4,500 (2007)
- Language family: Austroasiatic: Khasi–Palaungic; Palaungic; Angkuic; Muak Sa-aak

Language codes
- ISO 639-3: ukk
- Glottolog: tail1246

Muak Sa-aak (autonym: mùak sɤ́ʔàak, meaning 'mountain slope') is an Angkuic language spoken in the Burma-China border region by over 4,000 people.

== Demographics ==
There are some 4,460 Muak Sa-aak in Burma and China. Muak Sa-aak speakers are located primarily in Mong Yawng Township, Shan State, Burma (Hall 2010:4). There are at least 2 villages in China, with speakers possibly located in Thailand as well, though it would be nearly extinct there (Hall 2010).

Hall (2010) analyzes phonological data from the Muak Sa-aak village of Wan Fai, eastern Shan State, Burma, which has 620 people and is located very close to the Chinese border.

== Phonology ==
The following content is from Hall (2010)'s MA Thesis, consisting of her field work documentation and materials gathered from Muak Sa-aak speakers at Wan Fan village, Eastern Shan State.

=== Word structure ===
There are eight presyllables /p t k ʔ pʰ kʰ s m/, typically accompanied by a short vowel (either [ă] or [ɤ̆]) nucleus when realized, eg. /smɤɲ³/ [sɤ̆ˈmɤɲ³] 'star'. The phonological word in Muak Sa-aak is C_{1}.ˈC_{i}(C_{m})V(C_{f})^{T}.

=== Suprasegmentals (tones) ===
The Wan Fan variety of Muak Sa-aak has three tones: low, checked, and falling.

Tone	Note	Example
V̀	With long vowel, diphthongs, + short nuclei with sonorant codas	kjeː¹ 'root'
V́	High tone on vowel and a high falling tone on long vowel	kak² 'to bite'
V̂	High falling tone, only on live syllables	kʰraːŋ³ 'eagle'

=== Consonants ===
Hall (2010) describes the following onset clusters /pr pw pʰr pʰw (tr) kr kw kʰr kʰw/ in Muak Sa-aak. /tr/ is limited in Tai Lue borrowed words.

==== Onsets ====
Muak onsets
		Labial	Alveolar	Palatal	Velar	Glottal
Plosive	plain	p	t	c	k	ʔ
Plosive	aspirated	pʰ	tʰ	cʰ	kʰ	
Plosive	voiced	b	d		g	
Fricative		f	s			h
Nasal		m	n	ɲ	ŋ	
Approximant		w	l r	j		

==== Codas ====
Muak codas
	Bilabial	Alveolar	Palatal	Velar	Glottal
Plosive	p	t	c	k	ʔ
Nasal	m	n	ɲ	ŋ	
Approximant	w	l	j		

=== Vowels ===
Muak vowels
	Front	Central	Back
Close	i iː	ɯ ɯː	u uː
Mid	e eː	ɤ ɤː	o oː
Open	ɛ	a	ɔ
Diphthongs	[iə]	[uə]	
