= Blang language =

Language of the Blang people

Blang
- Pulang
- Region: China, Burma
- Ethnicity: Blang
- Native speakers: (68,000 cited 1994–2000)
- Language family: Austroasiatic: Khasi–Palaungic; Palaungic; Waic; Blang
- Dialects: Phang; Kem Degne
- Writing system: Tai Tham

Language codes
- ISO 639-3: Either: blr – Blang stu – Samtao
- Glottolog: blan1242 Blang samt1238 Samtao
- Linguasphere: 46-DBA-c

Blang (Pulang) is a Waic language cluster spoken by the Blang people of China and Myanmar. Within China, the Blang nationality operates as a broad, umbrella category that encompasses numerous distinct non-Wa, non-Palaung Austroasiatic-speaking communities across Yunnan province. This official ethnic classification includes the proper Blangs who actually belong to the Waic subgroup of the Palaungic branch, and virtually all Angkuic-speaking groups.

== Dialects ==
Samtao of Myanmar is a dialect of Blang language.

In Yunnan province of China, Blang dialects include the following:

- Bulang 布朗; representative dialect: Xinman'e 新曼俄, Bulangshan District 布朗山区, Menghai County
- A'erwa 阿尔佤 (Awa 阿佤); representative dialect: Guanshuang 关双, Mengman Township 勐满镇, Menghai County

== Phonology ==
Blang consonants
		Labial	Alveolar	Palatal	Velar	Glottal
Nasal	voiced	m	n	ɲ	ŋ	
Nasal	voiceless	m̥	n̥	ɲ̊		
Stop	plain	p	t	c	k	ʔ
Stop	aspirated	pʰ	tʰ	cʰ	kʰ	
Fricative		f	s			h
Approximant	voiced	w	l	j		
Approximant	voiceless		l̥	j̊		
Trill			r			

Blang vowels
	Front		Back			
	unrounded				rounded	
	plain	breathy	plain	breathy	plain	breathy
Close	i	i̤	ɯ	ɯ̤	u	ṳ
Close-mid	e	e̤			o	o̤
Open-mid					ɔ	ɔ̤
Open	a	a̤				

Blang also has two tones - high and low.

== See also ==
- Wa language

== Sources ==
- Li, Daoyong 李道勇; Nie, Xizhen 聂锡珍; Qiu, Efeng 邱锷锋 (1986). Bùlǎngyǔ jiǎnzhì 布朗语简志 [A Sketch of Blang] (in Chinese). Beijing: Minzu chubanshe.
- Harper, Jero Alan (2009). Phonological Descriptions of Plang spoken in Man Noi, La Gang, and Bang Deng Villages (in China) (PDF) (MA thesis). Payap University. Archived from the original (PDF) on 2017-08-09.
