= Bit language =

Austroasiatic language spoken in Laos and China

Bit
- Native to: Laos, China
- Native speakers: 2,600 (2007–2015)
- Language family: Austroasiatic: Khasi–Palaungic; Palaungic; Bit–Khang; Bit

Language codes
- ISO 639-3: bgk
- Glottolog: bitt1240
- ELP: Bit
- Bit is classified as Vulnerable by the UNESCO Atlas of the World's Languages in Danger

Bit (Khabit, Bid, Psing, Buxing) is an Austroasiatic language spoken by around 2,000 people in Phongsaly Province, northern Laos and in Mengla County, Yunnan, China.

== Names ==
In China, the Buxing people (布兴, 布幸, or 布醒; IPA: [puʃiŋ]) are also called Kami (佧米人) or Kabi (佧比人, IPA: [khabit]). The meaning of /bit/ ~ /bɛt/ is unclear.

Yan & Zhou (2012:157) list the following names for Khabit.

- pu siŋ, kʰa bet (autonyms)
- xa13 vit55 (Dai exonym)
- kʰaʔ mĭt (Khmu exonym)
- Kami (卡咪, Chinese exonym)

The Khabit name for Khmu is ta mɔi.

== Classification ==
Paul Sidwell (2014) and Svantesson (1990) classify Bit as Palaungic. It is most closely related to Kháng and Quang Lam.

== Distribution ==
=== Laos ===
In Laos, Bit is spoken by 2,000 people in the following villages. The speakers call themselves "Laubit".

- Nam Lie
- Nam Lan
- Nam Liaŋ
- Nam Pauk
- Bɔn Tsɛm Mɑi
- Nam Tha
- Bɔn Hui Huo
- Bɔn Bɔm Phiŋ
- Nam Nɔi

Kingsada (1999) covers the Khabit (khaa bet) language of Nale village, Bun Neua District, Phongsaly Province, Laos.

=== China ===
In Mengla County, Yunnan, China, Bit (Buxing) is spoken by 539 people as of 2000, in the following villages.

- Nanqian (南欠村), Manzhuang Village (曼庄村), Mohan Township (磨憨镇)
- Kami (卡咪村), Huiluo Village (回洛村), Kami Township (卡米镇) / Mengban (勐伴镇)

In Menghai County, Yunnan, China, there is a group of people known as the Bajia (八甲人) of Menghun (勐混), not to be confused with the Tai-speaking Bajia of Meng'a Township (勐阿镇), Menghai County), which is close to the border with Shan State, Myanmar. They live in Manbi Village (曼必村), Menghun Town (勐混镇), Menghai County, Yunnan (comprising 48 households and 217 persons), and have recently been classified by the Chinese government as ethnic Bulang people. Their autonym is Manbi (曼必) or Bi (必). The Bajia of Menghun believe that their ancestors had migrated from Laos. They are variously referred to by other ethnic groups as Kabi (卡必), Laos Bulang (老挝布朗), and Manbi people (曼必人). They do not consider themselves to be Bajia (八甲人), which is a name given to them by government officials, since they do not believe they are related to the Tai-speaking Bajia of Meng'a. Yunnan (1979) considers Bajia (八甲) to be a dialect of Tai Lue based on the group's autonym and language, with 225 Bajia people counted as of 1960. The Bajia had originally migrated from Bajia 八甲, Laojian Mountain 老肩山, Jinggu County. Yunnan (1979) documents the location of Bajia as Jingbo Township (景播乡), Meng'a District (勐阿区), Menghai County.

Yunnan (1979) reports that in Mengla County, the Khabit (Kabie, 卡别) have close relations with a group called the Bubeng (布崩), who numbered 15 households with about 100 people as of 1960, and speak a Hani language. Yunnan (1979) classifies both the Kabie (卡别) and Bubeng (布崩) as ethnic Hani people.

== Phonology ==
The following content is from a phonological description of the Laotian Bit dialect, spoken by 2,372 people in Laos. The data was recorded in 2011-2015 in Ban Bompiang, Luang Namtha province. The Bit dialect spoken in Yunnan (Gao 2004), known as Buxing, is apparently the same language with subtle difference in lexicon due to local innovations and borrowings from surrounding communities. Both are sesquisyllabic and atonal.

=== Word structure ===
Bit/Buxing phonological word can be mono- or sesquisyllabic. Derivational processes such as compounding and expressive formations may lead to disyllabic words. Stress falls on the final syllable. No tones or registers were reported. The phonological template is (C_{1}(ə(C_{2}))).ˈC_{i}(C_{m})V(ː)(C_{f}).

=== Consonants ===
==== Onsets ====
Bit onsets
		Labial	Alveolar	Palatal	Velar	Glottal
Plosive	plain	p	t	c	k	ʔ
Plosive	aspirated	pʰ	tʰ		kʰ	
Plosive	voiced	b	d	ɟ	ɡ	
Fricative			s			h
Nasal		m	n	ɲ	ŋ	
Approximant		w	l r	j		

- /c/ is a voiceless alveolo-palatal affricate [t͡ɕ].
- Badenoch (2015) reports the following onset clusters in Laotian Bit /pl pr tl tr kl kr kw cl cr sl sr/ while Buxing has /pl pr bl br sr sl kr kl/.
- Buxing lacks onsets /w j ɡ/, additionally it has three more sibilants /z ʒ ʃ/ and a voiceless bilabial nasal.

==== Codas ====
Bit codas
	Bilabial	Alveolar	Palatal	Velar	Glottal
Plosive	p	t	c	k	ʔ
Nasal	m	n	ɲ	ŋ	
Fricative			ç [jʱ]		h
Approximant	w	l r	j		

=== Vowels ===
Bit vowels
	Front	Central	Back
Close	i iː	ɨ ɨː	u uː
Close-mid	e eː	ə əː	o oː
Open-mid	ɛ ɛː	ə əː	ɔ ɔː
Open	a aː		ɒ ɒː
Diphthongs	iə	ɨa aɨ	uə

== Vocabulary ==
=== Proforms ===
The Bit pronominal system is a bit similar to Kháng and Bumang. The second person singular paradigm distinguishes female and male addressee while the third person singular distinguishes female, male, and inanimate forms.

		singular	dual	plural
1st person	exclusive	jɔː	daː	ɟiə
1st person	inclusive	jɔː	daː	ʔiː
2nd person	feminine	paː	rpaː	piə
2nd person	masculine	meː	rpaː	piə
3rd person	feminine	koː	rkoː	keː
3rd person	masculine	ŋɒː	rkoː	keː
3rd person	inanimate	ʔɒː	rkoː	keː
