= Etymology of tea =

History and origins of the word "tea"

Chinese character for tea

The etymology of the various words for tea reflects the history of transmission of tea drinking culture and trade from China to countries around the world. In this context, tea generally refers to the plant Camellia sinensis and/or the aromatic beverage prepared by pouring hot boiling water over the leaves. Most of the words for tea worldwide originate from Chinese pronunciations of the word 茶, and they fall into three broad groups: te, cha and chai, present in English as tea, cha or char, and chai. The earliest of the three to enter English is cha, which came in the 1590s via the Portuguese, who traded in Macao and picked up the Cantonese pronunciation of the word. The more common tea form arrived in the 17th century via the Dutch, who acquired it either indirectly from teh in Malay, or directly from the tê pronunciation in Min Chinese. The third form chai (used in English almost solely to refer to Indian-style spiced tea) originated from the Chinese pronunciation of cha, which travelled overland to Central Asia via the Silk Road where it picked up a Persian ending yi, and entered English via Hindustani in the 20th century.

The different regional pronunciations of the word in China are believed to have arisen from the same root, which diverged due to sound changes through the centuries. The written form of the Chinese word for tea was created in the mid-Tang dynasty by modifying the character 荼 pronounced tu, meaning a "bitter vegetable". Tu was used to refer to a variety of plants in ancient China, and acquired the additional meaning of "tea" by the Han dynasty. The Chinese word for tea was likely ultimately derived from the non-Sinitic languages of the botanical homeland of the tea plant in southwest China (or Burma), possibly from an archaic Austro-Asiatic root word *la, meaning "leaf".

== Origins ==
The pronunciations of the words for "tea" worldwide mostly fall into the three broad groups: te, cha and chai. The exceptions are those in some languages from Southwest China and Myanmar, the botanical homeland of the tea plant. Examples are la (meaning tea purchased elsewhere) and miiem (wild tea gathered in the hills) from the Wa people of northeast Burma and southwest Yunnan, letpet in Burmese and meng in Lamet meaning "fermented tea leaves", tshuaj yej in Hmong language as well as miang in Thai ("fermented tea"). These languages belong to the Austro-Asiatic, Tibeto-Burman, Hmong-Mien, and Tai families of languages now found in South East Asia and southwest of China. Scholars have suggested that the Austro-Asiatic languages may be the ultimate source of the word tea, including the various Chinese words for tea such as tu, cha and ming. Cha for example may have been derived from an Proto-Austroasiatic root *slaʔ (cognate with Proto-Vietic *s-laːʔ), meaning "leaf", while ming may be from Proto-Palaungic root *miɛm ("fermented tea leaves"). The Sinitic, Tibeto-Burman and Tai speakers who came into contact with the Austro-Asiatic speakers then borrowed their words for tea.

=== Words for "tea" in various Asian languages ===
Language	Name	Language	Name	Language	Name	Language	Name
Japanese	cha	Korean	cha	Old Chinese	/*rlaː/	Middle Chinese	drae
Mizo (Lushai, Hmar)	thingpui	Shan	nɯŋ	Tai Phake	ning	Tai Khamti	ning,phalap
Naga	khalap_{(2)}, cho	Mising	sa:ng	Mishmi	phala	Miju	phāla᷆p
Dimasa	gedreh	Qabiao	qalơ3	Xong	nu³¹dʑʰi³⁵_{(1)}	She	kʰi⁴⁴
Thai	miang_{(3)}	Lamet	meng	Wa	la, miiem	Palaung	miem
Lahu	la	Lisu	la ja	Akha	lor bor	Burmese	lahpet [ləpʰɛʔ]_{(4)}
Mru	lăʔpʰɑk⁻	Kachin	hpalap	Karen	lah hpah	Mon	la pek
Yi (Lolo)	la	Nusu	la ja	Hani	laqpeiv	Sora	wabol
Pa'O	la	Kayah	le	Naxi	le	Hmong	tshuaj yej, yej
Tangut	tsiq'_{(1)}	Bai	gu	She	ku	Waxiang	khu

- ^{(1)} Possible Sino-xenic origins
- ^{(2)} Smoked tea aged in bamboo tubes
- ^{(3)} Umbrella term for tea, including fermented tea leaves eaten as a meal
- ^{(4)} Fermented tea

== Chinese etymologies ==
The Chinese character for tea is 茶, originally written with an extra horizontal stroke as 荼 (pronounced tu), and acquired its current form in the Tang dynasty first used in the eighth-century treatise on tea The Classic of Tea. The word tú 荼 appears in ancient Chinese texts such as Shijing signifying a kind of "bitter vegetable" (苦菜) and refers to various plants such as sow thistle, chicory, or smartweed, and also used to refer to tea during the Han dynasty. By the Northern Wei the word tu also appeared with a wood radical, meaning a tea tree. The word 茶 first introduced during the Tang dynasty refers exclusively to tea. It is pronounced differently in the different varieties of Chinese, such as chá in Mandarin, zo and dzo in Wu Chinese, and ta and te in Min Chinese. One suggestion is that the pronunciation of tu (荼) gave rise to tê; but historical phonologists believe that cha, te and dzo all arose from the same root with a reconstructed hypothetical pronunciation dra (dr- represents a single consonant for a retroflex d), which changed due to sound shift through the centuries. Other ancient words for tea include jia (檟, defined as "bitter tu" during the Han dynasty), she (蔎), ming (茗, meaning "fine, special tender tea") and chuan (荈), but ming is the only other word for tea that is still in common use.

Most Chinese languages, such as Mandarin, Gan and Hakka, pronounce it along the lines of cha, but Min varieties along the Southern coast of China pronounce it like teh. These two pronunciations have made their separate ways into other languages around the world:

- Te is from the Amoy tê of Hokkien dialect in southern Fujian. The ports of Xiamen (Amoy) and Quanzhou were once major points of contact with foreign traders. Western European traders such as the Dutch may have taken this pronunciation either directly from Fujian or Taiwan where they had established a port, or indirectly via Malay traders in Bantam, Java. The Dutch pronunciation of thee then spread to other countries in Western Europe. This pronunciation gives rise to English "tea" and similar words in other languages, and is the most common form worldwide.
- Cha originated from different parts of China. The "cha" pronunciation may come from the Cantonese pronunciation tsa around Guangzhou (Canton) and the ports of Hong Kong and Macau, also major points of contact, especially with the Portuguese, who spread it to India in the 16th century. The Korean and Japanese pronunciations of cha, however, came not from Cantonese; rather, they were borrowed into Korean and Japanese during earlier periods of Chinese history. Chai (Persian: چای chay) might have been derived from Northern Chinese pronunciation of chá, which passed overland to Central Asia and Persia, where it picked up the Persian ending -yi before passing on to Russian, Arabic, Turkish, etc. The chai pronunciation first entered English either via Russian or Arabic in the early 20th century, and then as a word for "spiced tea" via Hindi-Urdu which acquired the word under the influence of the Mughals.

English has all three forms: cha or char (both pronounced /ˈtʃɑː/), attested from the late 16th century; tea, from the 17th; and chai, from the 20th.

Languages in more intense contact with Chinese, Sinospheric languages like Korean, Vietnamese and Japanese, may have borrowed their pronunciations for tea at an earlier time and from a different variety of Chinese, in the so-called Sino-Xenic pronunciations. Although normally pronounced as cha (commonly with an honorific prefix o- as ocha) or occasionally as sa (as in sadô or kissaten), Japanese also retains the early but now uncommon pronunciations of ta and da. Similarly Korean also has ta in addition to cha, and Vietnamese trà in addition to chè. The different pronunciations for tea in Japanese arose from the different times the pronunciations were borrowed into the language: Sa is the Tō-on reading (唐音, literally Tang reading but in fact post Tang), 'ta' is the Kan-on (漢音) from the Middle Chinese spoken at the Tang dynasty court at Chang'an; which is still preserved in modern Min Dong da. Ja is the Go-on (呉音) reading from Wuyue region, and comes from the earlier Wu language centered at Nanjing, a place where the consonant was still voiced, as it is today in Hunanese za or Shanghainese zo. Zhuang language also features southern cha-type pronunciations.

=== Pronunciations of 茶 in Sinitic languages ===
Dialect	Name	Dialect	Name	Dialect	Name	Dialect	Name	Dialect	Name
Standard Chinese	chá /ʈ͡ʂʰä³⁵/	Standard Cantonese	caa4 /t͡sʰaː²¹/	Shanghainese	zo /zo²³/	Minbei (Jian'ou)	dâ /ta³³/	Hainanese (Haikou)	dê /ʔdɛ³¹/
Sichuanese (Chengdu)	ca2 /t͡sʰa²¹/	Gan (Nanchang)	ca /t͡sʰa²⁴/	Xiang (Changsha)	za /t͡sa̠¹³/	Mindong (Fuzhou)	dà /ta⁵³/	Southern Min (Literary)	tâ,chhâ /ta¹³/,/t͡sʰa²³/
Jin (Taiyuan)	ca1 /t͡sʰa¹¹/	Hakka (Sixian)	chhà /t͡sʰa¹¹/	Wenzhounese	dzo /d͡zo³¹/	Teochew	dê /te⁵⁵/	Southern Min (Colloquial)	tê/têe /te²³/,/tɛ¹³/
Nanjing	cha /ʈ͡ʂʰɑ²⁴/	Huizhou	ca /t͡sʰa⁴⁴/	Wu (Hangzhou)	dza /d͡zɑ²¹³/	Xiang (Xiangtan)	dzo /d͡zɒ¹²/	Longyan	tiêe /ti̯ɛ¹¹/

== Derivations from te and cha ==
The different words for tea fall into two main groups: "te-derived" (Min) and "cha-derived" (Cantonese and Mandarin). Most notably through the Silk Road; global regions with a history of land trade with central regions of Imperial China (such as North Asia, Central Asia, South Asia, and the Middle East) pronounce it along the lines of 'cha', whilst most global maritime regions with a history of sea trade with certain southeast regions of Imperial China (such as Europe), pronounce it like 'teh'.

The words that various languages use for "tea" reveal where those nations first acquired their tea and tea culture:

- Portuguese traders were the first Europeans to import the herb in large amounts. The Portuguese borrowed their word for tea (chá) from Cantonese in the 1550s via their trading posts in the south of China, especially Macau.
- In Central Asia, Mandarin cha developed into Persian chay, and this form spread with Central Asian trade and cultural influence.
- Russia (чай, chyai) encountered tea in Central Asia.
- The Nepali word for tea is Chiya (चिया), it comes directly from the Mandarin Chinese word chá (茶).
- The Dutch word for "tea" (thee) comes from Min Chinese. The Dutch may have borrowed their word for tea through trade directly from Fujian or Formosa, or from Malay traders in Java who had adopted the Min pronunciation as teh. The Dutch first imported tea around 1606 from Macao via Bantam, Java, and played a dominant role in the early European tea trade through the Dutch East India Company, influencing other European languages, including English, French (thé), Spanish (té), and German (Tee).
- The Dutch first introduced tea to England in 1644. By the 19th century, most British tea was purchased directly from merchants in Canton, whose population uses cha, the English however kept its Dutch-derived Min word for tea, although char is sometimes used colloquially to refer to the drink in British English (see below).

At times, a te form will follow a cha form, or vice versa, giving rise to both in one language, at times one an imported variant of the other:

- In North America, the word chai is used to refer almost exclusively to the Indian masala chai (spiced tea) beverage, in contrast to tea itself.
- The inverse pattern is seen in Moroccan Arabic where shay means "generic, or black Middle Eastern tea" whereas atay refers particularly to Zhejiang or Fujian green tea with fresh mint leaves. The Moroccans are said to have acquired this taste for green tea—unique in the Arab world— from British exports in the 19th century (see Moroccan tea culture).
- The colloquial Greek word for tea is tsáï, from Slavic chai. Its formal equivalent, used in earlier centuries, is téïon, from tê.
- The Polish word for a tea-kettle is czajnik, which comes from the Russian word Чай (pronounced chai). However, tea in Polish is herbata, which, as well as Belarusian гарба́та (harbáta) and Lithuanian arbata, was derived from the Dutch herba thee, although a minority believes that it was derived Latin herba thea, meaning "tea herb."
- The normal word for tea in Finnish is tee, which is a Swedish loan. However, it is often colloquially referred to, especially in Eastern Finland and in Helsinki, as tsai, tsaiju, saiju or saikka, which is cognate to the Russian word chai. The latter word refers always to black tea, while green tea is always tee.
- In Ireland, or at least in Dublin, the term cha is sometimes used for "tea," as is pre-vowel-shift pronunciation "tay" (from which the Irish Gaelic word tae is derived). Char was a common slang term for tea throughout British Empire and Commonwealth military forces in the 19th and 20th centuries, crossing over into civilian usage.
- The British slang word "char" for "tea" arose from its Cantonese Chinese pronunciation "cha" with its spelling affected by the fact that ar is a more common way of representing the phoneme /ɑː/ in British English.

=== Derivatives of te ===
Language	Name	Language	Name	Language	Name	Language	Name	Language	Name
Afrikaans	tee	Armenian	թեյ [tʰɛj]	Basque	tea	Belarusian	гарба́та (harbáta)_{(1)}	Berber	ⴰⵜⴰⵢ, atay
Catalan	te	Kashubian	(h)arbata_{(1)}	Czech	té or thé_{(2)}	Danish	te	Dutch	thee
English	tea	Esperanto	teo	Estonian	tee	Faroese	te	Finnish	tee
French	thé	West Frisian	tee	Galician	té	German	Tee	Greek	τέϊον téïon
Hebrew	תה, te	Hungarian	tea	Icelandic	te	Irish	tae	Italian	tè
Javanese	ꦠꦺꦃ tèh	Kannada	ಟೀಸೊಪ್ಪು ṭīsoppu	Khmer	តែ tae	(scientific) Latin	thea	Latvian	tēja
Leonese	té	Limburgish	tiè	Lithuanian	arbata_{(1)}	Low Saxon	Tee [tʰɛˑɪ] or Tei [tʰaˑɪ]	Malay (including Malaysian and Indonesian standards)	teh
Malayalam	തേയില tēyila	Maltese	tè	Norwegian	te	Occitan	tè	Polish	herbata_{(1)}
Scots	tea [tiː] ~ [teː]	Scottish Gaelic	tì, teatha	Sinhalese	tē තේ	Spanish	té	Sundanese	entèh
Swedish	te	Tamil	தேநீர் tēnīr _{(3)}	Telugu	తేనీరు tēnīr _{(4)}	Western Ukrainian	герба́та (herbáta)_{(1)}	Welsh	te

Notes:

- ^{(1)} from Latin herba thea, found in Polish, Western Ukrainian, Lithuanian, Belarusian and Kashubian
- ^{(2)} té or thé, but this term is considered archaic and is a literary expression; since roughly the beginning of the 20th century, čaj is used for 'tea' in Czech; see the following table
- ^{(3)} nīr means water; tēyilai means "tea leaf" (ilai "leaf")
- ^{(4)} nīru means water; ṭīyāku means "tea leaf" (āku = leaf in Telugu)

=== Derivatives of sa, cha or chai ===
Language	Name	Language	Name	Language	Name	Language	Name	Language	Name
Assamese	চাহ sah	Bengali	চা cha (sa in Eastern regions)	Cebuano	tsá	Chinese	茶 Chá	English	cha or char
Gujarati	ચા chā	Japanese	茶, ちゃ cha_{(1)}	Kannada	ಚಹಾ chahā	Kapampangan	cha	Khasi	sha
Pnar	cha	Punjabi	چاہ ਚਾਹ chá	Korean	차 cha_{(1)}	Kurdish	ça	Lao	ຊາ /saː˦˥/
Marathi	चहा chahā	Oḍiā	ଚା' cha'a	Persian	چای chā	Portuguese	chá	Sindhi	chahen چانهه
Somali	shaah	Tagalog	tsaá	Thai	ชา /t͡ɕʰaː˧/	Tibetan	ཇ་ ja	Vietnamese	trà and chè_{(2)}

Notes:

- ^{(1)} The main pronunciations of 茶 in Korea and Japan are 차 cha and ちゃ cha, respectively. (Japanese ocha (おちゃ) is honorific.)
- ^{(2)} Trà and chè are variant pronunciations of 茶; the latter is the colloquial reading (âm Nôm) and is solely used in Northern Vietnamese dialects to describe the tea plant, tea leaf and nước chè, a drink made from freshly boiled raw tea leaves while trà is widely used for all contexts. Chè also has another meaning which is an umbrella term for puddings and desserts.

Language	Name	Language	Name	Language	Name	Language	Name	Language	Name
Albanian	çaj	Amharic	ሻይ shay	Arabic	شاي shāy	Assyrian Neo-Aramaic	ܟ݈ܐܝ chai	Armenian	թեյ tey
Azerbaijani	çay	Bosnian	čaj	Bulgarian	чай chai	Chechen	чай chay	Croatian	čaj
Czech	čaj	English	chai	Finnish dialectal	tsai, tsaiju, saiju or saikka	Georgian	ჩაი chai	Greek	τσάι tsái
Hindi	चाय chāy	Kazakh	шай shai	Kyrgyz	чай chai	Kinyarwanda	icyayi	Judaeo-Spanish	צ'יי chai
Macedonian	чај čaj	Malayalam	ചായ chaaya	Mongolian	цай tsai	Nepali	chiyā चिया	Pashto	چای chay
Persian	چای chāī _{(1)}	Romanian	ceai	Russian	чай chay	Serbian	чај čaj	Slovak	čaj
Slovene	čaj	Swahili	chai	Tajik	чой choy	Tatar	чәй çäy	Tlingit	cháayu
Turkish	çay	Turkmen	çaý	Ukrainian	чай chai	Urdu	چائے chai	Uzbek	choy

Notes:

- ^{(1)} Derived from the earlier pronunciation چا cha.

== Bibliography ==
- Benn, James A. (2015). Tea in China: A Religious and Cultural History. Hong Kong University Press. ISBN 978-988-8208-73-9.
- Mair, Victor H.; Hoh, Erling (2009). The True History of Tea. Thames & Hudson. pp. 262–264. ISBN 978-0-500-25146-1.
