= Bit–Khang languages =

Austroasiatic language

Bit–Khang
- Geographic distribution: Laos, Vietnam, China
- Linguistic classification: Austroasiatic: Khasi–Palaungic; Palaungic; Bit–Khang

Language codes
- Glottolog: khao1243

The Bit–Khang languages consist of:

- Bit cluster: Bit (a.k.a. Khabit, Psing, Buxing) and Quang Lam
- Khang cluster: Kháng and Bumang

The Bit–Khang languages are spoken in southern China, northern Laos, and northwestern Vietnam. The Bit-Khang branch was first proposed by Paul Sidwell (2014).

== Classification ==
At first, Bit–Khang languages were usually classified as Khmuic, but Sidwell (2014) has since demonstrated the Palaungic affiliation of Bit-Khang, as well as its unity. Paul Sidwell (2014) proposes that these languages constitute a subgroup of Palaungic, since they display lexical innovations characteristic of the Palaungic branch such as 'eye', 'fire', 'blood', and 'laugh'.

Gloss	Proto-Palaungic lexical innovation
eye	*ˀŋaːj
blood	*snaːm
fire	*ŋal
laugh	*kəɲaːs

Sidwell (2014) suggests that Bit–Khang may have originally been Eastern Palaungic, due to various isoglosses shared with Waic, Lametic, and Angkuic, but was later heavily relexified by Khmuic as Bit-Khang speakers migrated eastward into Khmuic territory.
