= Proto-Palaungic language =

Reconstructed ancestor of the Palaungic languages

Proto-Palaungic
- Reconstruction of: Palaungic languages
- Era: c. 1000 – c. 500 BCE
- Reconstructed ancestor: Proto-Austroasiatic
- Lower-order reconstructions: Proto-Danau; Proto-Palaung–Riang; Proto-Waic; Proto-Angkuic; Proto-Lametic; Proto-Bit–Khang

Proto-Palaungic is the reconstructed proto-language of the Palaungic languages of mainland Southeast Asia.

== Homeland ==
Paul Sidwell (2015) suggests that the Urheimat (homeland) of Proto-Palaungic was in what is now the border region of Laos and Sipsongpanna in Yunnan, China. The Khmuic homeland was adjacent to the Palaungic homeland, resulting in many lexical borrowings among the two branches due to intense contact. Sidwell (2014) suggests that the word for 'water' (Proto-Palaungic *ʔoːm), which Gérard Diffloth had used as one of the defining lexical innovations for his Northern Mon-Khmer branch, was likely borrowed from Palaungic into Khmuic.

== Reconstructed forms ==
The following list of Proto-Palaungic reconstructions, organized by semantic category, is from Sidwell (2015: 100-111).

Personal pronouns

	singular	dual	plural
1st person (inclusive)	*ʔɔːʔ	*ʔaːj	*ʔɛʔ
1st person (exclusive)	-	*jaːr	*ˀjɛ/eːʔ
2nd person	*miːʔ	*paːr	*pɛʔ
3rd person	*ʔan; *ʔɤːn	*gaːr, *gɛʔ	*giːʔ

Demonstratives

- *nɔʔ ‘this (prox.)’
- *neʔ ‘this’
- *tVj ‘that (dist.)’

Numerals

- *diːʔ ‘one, alone’
- *moːh ‘one’
- *ləʔaːr ‘two’
- *ləʔɔːj ‘three’
- *poːn ‘four’
- *pəsan ‘five’
- *tɔːl ‘six’
- *təpuːl ‘seven’
- *taːʔ ‘eight’
- *tiːm ‘nine’
- *kɤːl ‘ten’

Cereal cultivation

- *sŋɔːʔ ‘paddy rice’
- *-gɔr ‘ear (of grain)’
- *rəŋkoːʔ ‘husked rice’
- *ɓaːʔ ‘paddy rice’ (restricted distribution)
- *səkɔːj ‘millet’
- *səɓeʔ ‘millet, Job's tears’
- *soːŋ ‘to steam (rice)’
- *səkaːm ‘chaff, bran’
- *cəmaːl ‘seed grain’
- *kənɟaːn ‘sickle’
- *ʋɔk ‘hook’ / ‘to reap, harvest’
- *ʋɤc ‘to reap, harvest’
- *moːl ‘to dibble’
- *ˀmaːr ‘swidden field’
- *ɟiək ‘to cultivate’
- *guːm ‘to winnow’
- *piɛr ‘winnowing tray’
- *kroːr ‘granary’

Agriculture and village economy

- *pɔŋ ‘tuber’
- *rəɓaːj ‘bean’
- *kəlɔːŋ ‘seed’
- *cəmaːl ‘seed’
- *ləŋaːʔ ‘sesame’
- *t.kiəl ‘cucumber’
- *miəm ‘tea’
- *-meːʔ ‘sugar’
- *səroːɁ ‘taro’
- *-piːr ‘pumpkin’
- *-luŋ ‘eggplant/gourd’
- *tərɗɔŋ ‘gourd bottle’
- *rəŋɔ/aŋ ‘knife (iron?)’
- *ɓoːj ‘dipper, ladle’
- *kɔk ‘handle of tool’
- *lak ‘to hoe, hammer’
- *tiəm ‘to hammer’
- *bliɛs ‘spear’
- *plaːʔ ‘blade’
- *kliːŋ ‘metal bell’
- *kruːŋ ‘drum’
- *klɔːŋ ‘drum’
- *cətuŋ ‘drum’
- *-ɓeʔ ‘clothes’
- *-gɤːŋ ‘pillow’
- *təcɔːs ‘knife’
- *ʋaːc ‘knife, sword’
- *-lac ‘needle’ (< ‘insert’)
- *pəɲeːʔ ‘needle’
- *ɟiŋ ‘to sew’
- *cəduːʔ ‘silk’
- *-siːʔ ‘rope, string’
- *ruːp ‘fishing net’
- *ɟɔːr ‘basket’
- *ɗi(ː)ŋ ‘bamboo container’
- *baːn ‘tray’
- *suːr ‘bag’

Fruits and plant products

- *ɟriːʔ ‘fig, Ficus’
- *pliːʔ ‘fruit’
- *ləŋʋaːʔ ‘fig tree’
- *klɔːj ‘banana’
- *rəmɔːs ‘banana’
- *kəɗoːʔ ‘plantain, banana’
- *rəʋɔj ‘sour fig’
- *ˀrɤs ‘fig’
- *cɤ/am ‘to plant’
- *cənɤ/am ‘herb, medicine’
- *ˀjɤc ‘drunk’
- *smɤːʔ ‘vine, cord’

Domesticated animals

- *bɛʔ ‘goat’
- *cɔːʔ ‘dog’
- *-leːk ‘pig’
- *mraŋ ‘horse’
- *miɛw ‘cat’
- *mɤk ‘cattle’
- *mənaːʔ ‘buffalo’
- *traːk ‘buffalo’
- *ʔiɛr ‘chicken’
- *daːʔ ‘duck’
- *koːŋ ‘peacock’

Invertebrates

- *ɓa/ɤr ‘flying ant’
- *ɓeːŋ ‘spider’
- *caːr ‘grasshopper’
- *cɔːʔ ‘red ant’
- *gɔŋ ‘grub, worm’
- *ʰraːc ‘maggot’
- *-lɔːʔ ‘snail’
- *lVŋ ‘firefly’
- *maʔ ‘insect’
- *-mɔːt ‘weevil’
- *mrɤɲ ‘body louse’
- *ɲaŋ ‘caterpillar’
- *ŋruːɲ ‘ant/termite’
- *pəsiɛr ‘bee’
- *plɤːm ‘leech (land)’
- *-praːŋ ‘mosquito’
- *raːk ‘termite’
- *rɔːj ‘housefly’
- *-riːt ‘cricket’
- *-riɛŋ ‘wasp’
- *saːj ‘bee, wasp’
- *smuːc ‘ant’
- *suːt ‘bee’
- *ʋaːk ‘insect, worm’
- *-ʔiːp ‘centipede’
- *-ʔɔːr ‘hornet’
- *kəʔaːɲ ‘wasp’

Housing and infrastructure

- *gaːŋ ‘house’
- *rɔŋ ‘wall’
- *təʋaːŋ ‘hearth’
- *rəmɤs ‘bamboo flooring’
- *tɔ(ː)ŋ ‘ladder, stair’
- *plaŋ ‘thatching-grass’ (Imperata cylindrica)
- *-rɔŋ ‘post, pole’
- *ˀjɤːŋ ‘village’
- *-ruʔ ‘village’
- *-ɗeːŋ ‘road, way’
- *rɔːŋ ‘ditch, channel’
- *dap ‘to dam’
- *kroːr ‘granary’
- *kraːs ‘veranda’
- *kraːʔ ‘road, way’

== Lexical similarities with Khmuic ==
Sidwell (2015) notes that Palaungic and Khmuic share many lexical items, but considers this phenomenon to be a result of lexical diffusion due to intense language contact. Sidwell (2015:112-113) lists the following Proto-Palaungic forms as having diffused from Palaungic into Khmuic.

Palaungic > Khmuic lexical forms

- *ʔɔːt ‘wipe’
- *ʔiɛk ‘armpit’
- *ɓɤs ‘carry on head/back’
- *bliɛs ‘spear’
- *cəˀŋam ‘clear, clean’
- *criːl ‘gold’
- *gɔːʔ ‘friend; relative’
- *kərɗi(ː)ŋ ‘navel’
- *kɤːŋ ‘to dig’
- *kʋɤj ‘above, upper part’
- *laj ‘to trade’
- *mɔk ‘to fell’
- *(ʰ)ɲɤk ‘sticky’
- *tjaːk ‘sambar deer’

Sidwell (2015:113) lists the following Proto-Palaungic forms as having diffused from Khmuic into Palaungic.

Khmuic > Palaungic lexical forms

- *ɟɤːl ‘light in weight’
- *kla(ː)w ‘testicles’

Sidwell (2015:114) lists the following Proto-Palaungic forms that are also shared with Khmuic but not with other Austroasiatic branches, and is unsure of whether they diffused from Palaungic to Khmuic or vice versa.

- *-daːk ‘palm, sole’
- *-jaːŋ ‘female’
- *kəlɔːŋ ‘seed’
- *krlaːŋ ‘planet’
- *-nuːs ‘mouth’
- *tɤːʔ ‘smoke’
- *sŋɔːʔ ‘paddy rice’

== See also ==
- Proto-Palaungic reconstructions (Wiktionary)
- Proto-Austroasiatic language
