= Quảng Lâm language =

Poorly attested language of northwestern Vietnam

Quảng Lâm
- Brển Quảng Lâm
- Native to: Vietnam
- Language family: Austroasiatic: Khasi–Palaungic; Palaungic; Bit–Khang; Quảng Lâm

Language codes
- ISO 639-3: None (mis)
- Glottolog: None

Quảng Lâm is an unclassified, poorly attested Austroasiatic language spoken in Quảng Lâm commune, Điện Biên Province, northwestern Vietnam. Nguyễn Văn Huy (1975) is the only published resource that contains data of Quang Lam. The Ethnologue lists Quang Lam as an alternate name for Kháng.

Quang Lam speakers are officially classified as ethnic Khang people. Tạ (2021) refers the language as Kháng Quảng Lâm.

== Classification ==
Nguyen (1975) speculates that Quang Lam may be closely related to Kháng (variously classified as either a Palaungic or Khmuic language), but this has yet to be verified. Data is scanty and presented only in Vietnamese orthography (Quốc Ngữ). Quang Lam speakers claim to not have an autonym, and simply call themselves "Brển Quảng Lâm." Their word for 'person, human' is p'xinh, which is also a name for Bit (Psing).

== Phonology ==
Nguyen (1975:431) lists the following Quang Lam complex consonant onsets in Vietnamese orthography: s'n, p'x, p's, p'k', p'r, th'l, chơr, s'ch, s'i, k'r, k'ch, m'r, l'm, r'v, d'd, r'l.

== See also ==
- Quang Lam word list (Wiktionary)
