= Khamet language =

The Khamet language (/kəˈmɛt/ kə-MET) may refers to one or two closely Palaungic language(s) in mainly-Tai peoples area:

- The Khamet language (Yunnan) ([kʰɤ˧˩met˥˧])
- The Khamet language (Laos) ([kʰəmɛːt])

The exact positions both languages/varieties in Palaungic are unclear and the two languages/varieties might be one.
