= Kiorr language =

Austroasiatic language spoken in Laos

Kiorr
- Kha Kior
- Native to: Laos
- Native speakers: (2,400 cited 1985)
- Language family: Austroasiatic: Khasi–Palaungic; Palaungic; Lametic?; Kiorr

Language codes
- ISO 639-3: xko – inclusive code Individual code: cno – Con (spurious per Glottolog)
- Glottolog: kior1239

Kiorr (Kha Kior) is a Palaungic language of Luang Namtha Province, Laos.

Diffloth & Zide (1992) had listed Con as a Lametic language. However, it is treated as a dialect of Kiorr in Sidwell (2010). Kiorr could be a historical name for the Saamtaav people.
