= Lawa language =

Austroasiatic language spoken in Thailand

Lawa
- La'wa, L'wa, Lava
- Pronunciation: [ləvɨaʔ]
- Region: Thailand
- Ethnicity: Lawa
- Native speakers: 15,000 (2007)
- Language family: Austroasiatic: Khasi–Palaungic; Palaungic; Waic; Lawa
- Writing system: Thai script

Language codes
- ISO 639-3: Either: lwl – Bo Luang Lawa (Eastern Lawa) lcp – Umpai Lawa (Western Lawa)
- Glottolog: lawa1256
- ELP: Lawa
- Phalok
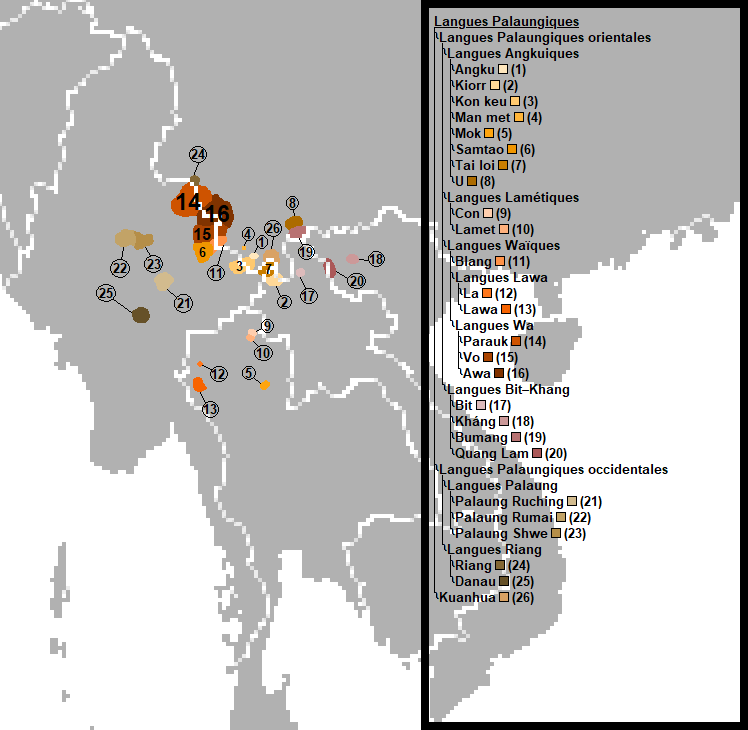
- Lawa

Lawa (Eastern Lawa pronunciation: [ləvɨaʔ], also La'wa, L'wa) is an Austroasiatic language of Thailand. There are two distinct varieties or dialects of Lawa, considered to be separate languages; their names in the Ethnologue are Eastern Lawa and Western Lawa. They are spoken in Lawa villages in the provinces of Mae Hong Son and Chiang Mai in Northern Thailand.

Linguistically, Lawa and Wa are sister groups within the Waic subbranch of the Palaungic branch of the Austroasiatic language family.

== Sociolinguistics ==
Eastern Lawa is distinct from Western Lawa despite being highly cognate because the two languages are not mutually understandable based on consistent testimonies of Eastern and Western Lawa speakers and testing by SIL.

There are two distinct dialects spoken among the Eastern Lawa. These dialects have differences in pronunciation and some lexeme differences. The differences, however, do not present any difficulty in comprehension between speakers of these dialects, due to their close interaction. The main dialect is from Bo Luang, (known locally as juang ra), which is by far the largest Eastern Lawa village, with a population of approximately 3,000 people. Bo Luang is spoken in 16 villages of Bo Luang and Bo Sali subdistricts in Hot District, Chiang Mai Province. The other dialect is from Bo Sangae, (known locally as juang tiang).

Phalok is also considered a dialect of Eastern Lawa that had an ethnic population of 200 people in 2007, but has been extinct since the 1950s according to the UNESCO Atlas of the World's Languages in Danger.

Eastern Lawa has a high level of language vitality and is spoken in the home by all ages. Government education, village notices and official business are usually undertaken in Central Thai. Most Eastern Lawa are bi-lingual with at least Northern Thai, although there are some older people who will reply in Lawa when spoken to in Northern Thai. The younger generation tend to be fluent in Central Thai because of the education system and mostly fluent in Northern Thai due to the inter-marriages between Lawa and Northern Thais.

== Phonology ==
=== Phonemes ===
The data for Lawa was collected by Ratanakul & Sysamouth between 1975 and 1980 from Ban Papae village, Mae Sariang district, Mae Hong Son province, Thailand. The English version was published in 1997.

Initial consonants
			Labial	Alveolar	Palatal	Velar	Glottal
Nasal		plain	m	n	ɲ	ŋ	
Nasal		aspirated	mʱ	nʱ	ɲʱ	ŋʱ	
Nasal		preglottalized	ˀm	ˀn	ˀɲ	ˀŋ	
Stop	voiceless	plain	p	t	c	k	ʔ
Stop	voiceless	aspirated	pʰ	tʰ	cʰ	kʰ	
Stop	voiced	plain	b	d		ɡ	
Stop	voiced	prenasalized	ᵐb	ⁿd	ᶮc	ᵑɡ	
Fricative		voiceless	f	s			h
Fricative		voiced	v				
Approximant		plain		l	j	ɣ̞	
Approximant		preglottalized		ˀl	ˀj	ˀɣ̞	

Lawa vowels
	Front	Central	Back
Close	i	ɨ	u
Close-mid		ɤ	
Mid	e	ə	o
Open-mid	ɛ		ɔ
Open		a	

=== Word structure ===
The majority of lexical roots in Lawa are monosyllabic, though there are few disyllabic. In disyllables, stress falls the strongest at the final syllables (second syllables). Lexical pitch appears to be non-phonemic in Lawa, considering falling pitch is recorded on words in isolation, but generally not found in phrases or word uttered in context. The canonical word shape is (Cə).ˈC_{i}(j/l)V(C_{f}).

== See also ==
- Wa language
