= Palaun language =

Palaun may refer to:

- Palauan language
- Palaung language
