= Bumang language =

Austroasiatic language spoken in China

Bumang
- Pronunciation: [bú máŋ]
- Native to: China
- Region: Yunnan
- Ethnicity: Manzhang Dai
- Native speakers: 200 (2007)
- Language family: Austroasiatic: Khasi–Palaungic; Palaungic; Bit–Khang; Bumang

Language codes
- ISO 639-3: bvp
- Glottolog: buma1247
- ELP: Bumang

Bumang (Bumang pronunciation: [bú máŋ], Chinese: 布芒语) is a tonal Austroasiatic language of Yunnan, China. It is spoken by about 200 people in Manzhang (曼仗), Mengla District (勐拉地区), Jinping County, Honghe Prefecture. The existence of Bumang was only recently documented by Chinese linguist Dao Jie in the mid-2000s. It is closely related to Kháng.

== Classification ==
Jerold A. Edmondson (2010) considers Bumang and the closely related Kháng language to be Khmuic languages based on lexical evidence, while Dao Jie (刀洁, 2007) proposes that Bumang may be a Palaungic language.

Although Bumang and Mang have similar names and are both spoken in Honghe Prefecture of Yunnan Province in China, they are not closely related and do not appear to be in the same branch together. Whereas Edmondson considers Bumang to likely be a Khmuic language, Mang is not one, and is more closely related to the Bolyu and Bugan languages of southern China.

== Population ==
The Bumang autonym is bu˨˦maŋ˨˦. In China, the Bumang are classified as part of the Dai nationality. Bumang speakers are surrounded by speakers of White Tai (Tai Don), Black Tai (Tai Dam), and Pu'er Dai. Bumang women's clothing is identical to that of the Kháng, Ksingmul, White Tai, and Black Tai.

Within Manzhang (曼仗), Mengla District (勐拉地区), Bumang is spoken in Shangmanzhang (上曼仗, with 22 households; known in the Bumang language as ban˩˨jau˥˩) and Xiamanzhang (下曼仗, with 49 households). Shangmanzhang (上曼仗) is located in Tiantou Village (田头村), Mengla Township (勐拉乡), while Xiamanzhang (下曼仗) is situated on a state-run rubber plantation (国营橡胶农场).

The Bumang are descended from Kháng people who had immigrated from Vietnam in the 1800s.

== Phonology ==
Like Kháng, Bumang is a tonal language.

=== Consonants ===
There is no onset cluster in Bumang.

==== Initials ====
Bumang initials
| | | Labial | Alveolar | Alveopalatal | Velar | Glottal |
|---|---|---|---|---|---|---|
| Plosive | voiceless | p | t | | k | ʔ |
| Plosive | aspirated | pʰ | tʰ | | kʰ | |
| Plosive | voiced | b | d | | | |
| Fricative | voiceless | | s | ɕ | x | h |
| Fricative | voiced | v | z | ʑ | | |
| Affricate | plain | | t͡s | t͡ɕ | | |
| Affricate | aspirated | | t͡sʰ | | | |
| Nasal | | m | n | ȵ | ŋ | |
| Lateral | | | l | | | |
| Approximant | | | | | w | |

==== Codas ====
Bumang codas
| | Bilabial | Alveolar | Palatal | Velar |
|---|---|---|---|---|
| Plosive | p | t | | k |
| Nasal | m | n | | ŋ |
| Semivowel | u | | i | |

=== Vowels ===
==== Plains ====
Bumang monophthongs
| | Front | Central | Back |
|---|---|---|---|
| Close | i | ɯ | u |
| Mid | e | ə | o |
| Open | ɛ | ă, a | ɔ |

==== Diphthongs ====
Bumang diphthongs are /ɯi ui ia ɯa ua iu əi oi ea eu əu ăi, ai ɔi ɛa ɛu ău, au/.

== Vocabulary ==
Bumang numerals show sign of contact with other Austroasiatic branches (Khmuic,...). Numbers larger than five have been replaced by Tai loans.

=== Pronouns ===
The dual forms in Bumang are literally lexical juxtapositions of singular pronouns + bɯa²⁴, meaning 'two' (presumably derived from Proto-Austroasiatic *ɓa:r instead of Proto-Palaungic *(lə)ʔaːr). The plural forms of second person and third person are not marked for gender.

| | | singular | dual | plural |
|---|---|---|---|---|
| 1st person | exclusive | da⁵⁵ | da⁵⁵ bɯa²⁴ | nɔ²⁴ |
| 1st person | inclusive | da⁵⁵ | da⁵⁵ bɯa²⁴ | jia⁵⁵ |
| 2nd person | feminine | pa⁵⁵ | pa⁵⁵ bɯa²⁴ | mət²⁴ pia⁵⁵ |
| 2nd person | masculine | mi⁵⁵ | mi⁵⁵ bɯa²⁴ | mət²⁴ pia⁵⁵ |
| 3rd person | feminine | ku³³ | ku³³ bɯa²⁴ | ki⁵⁵ |
| 3rd person | masculine | ŋa⁵⁵ | ŋa⁵⁵ bɯa²⁴ | ki⁵⁵ |

=== Body parts ===
| Gloss | Bumang | proto-Palaungic |
|---|---|---|
| arm, hand | ti⁵⁵ | *tiːʔ |
| armpit | buŋ⁵⁵ dɔ⁵⁵ | *kəldoːʔ |
| (bone) joint of body | ɯŋ⁵⁵ tɔ²⁴ | *cəʔaːŋ |
| ear | tɔ²¹ | *toːr |
| face | ŋai⁵⁵ | *ˀŋaːj ('eye') |
| knee | kin⁵⁵ hɔŋ⁵¹ | *groːŋ |
| lip | phɛn²⁴ lɯp²¹ | *-ɓɤr |
| nose | ku⁵⁵ mɯi³³ | *muːs |
| penis | kɛ⁵⁵ | *kleʔ |
| tooth | həŋ⁵¹ | *sraːŋ |
| tongue | tak²¹ | *-taːk |

=== Fauna ===
| Gloss | Bumang | proto-Palaungic |
|---|---|---|
| ant | bu²⁴ mut²¹ | *smuːc |
| bee | ɕoi⁵⁵ | *saːj 'wasp' |
| bird | tsim²⁴ | *ciːm |
| buffalo | hak²¹ | *traːk |
| cat | miu²⁴ | *miɛw |
| crow | bu²⁴ lak²⁴ | *kə(l)ʔaːk |
| deer | săk²¹ | *tjaːk |
| dog | tsua⁵⁵ | *cɔːʔ |
| eagle | bu²⁴ kaŋ⁵¹ | *klaːŋ |
| elephant | bu²⁴ tsaŋ²¹ | *caːŋ |
| fowl | jia³³ | *ʔiɛr |
| fish | ka⁵⁵ | *kaʔ |
| hornet | bu²⁴ lia⁵¹ | *pəsiɛr 'bee' |
| louse | phin⁵¹ tɯt²¹ | *mrɤɲ |
| monkey | ɕua⁵⁵ | *sʋaʔ |
| muntjac | bu²⁴ pɔi⁵⁵ | *poːs 'barking deer' |
| tiger | huai⁵¹ | *rəʋaːj |
| turtledove | tsim²⁴ ku²⁴ | *-kuːʔ |
| weasel | kɯi⁵¹ pɯn⁵¹ luŋ⁵⁵ sɔ²⁴ | *car 'civet' |

=== Flora & nature ===
| Gloss | Bumang | proto-Palaungic |
|---|---|---|
| bamboo shoot | băŋ⁵⁵ | *ɓaŋ |
| earth, ground | tia⁵⁵ | *kəteːʔ |
| fire, flame | ŋăn⁵⁵ | *ŋal |
| fruit, gourd | pɛ⁵⁵ | *pliːʔ |
| grass | băt²⁴ | *ɓat |
| leaf | na⁵⁵ | *ʰlaʔ |
| lightning | la³³ la³³ | *lak-lɔk |
| melon | pɛ⁵⁵ pia²⁴ | *-piːr 'pumpkin' |
| millet | kɔi²⁴ | *səkɔːj |
| rain | kɛa⁵⁵, kia⁵⁵ | *cleːʔ |
| rice (grain) | kɔ⁵¹ | *rəŋkoːʔ |
| rice (tree) | ŋua⁵⁵ | *sŋɔːʔ |
| sun | lɔ²¹ ŋai⁵⁵ ŋi⁵⁵ | cəŋiːʔ |
| sugarcane | mɛa⁵⁵ | -meːʔ |
| taro | hɔ⁵⁵ | səroːɁ |
| water | ɔm²⁴ | *ʔoːm |

=== Tools and concepts ===
| Gloss | Bumang | proto-Palaungic |
|---|---|---|
| bran, chaff, husk | kam⁵¹ | *səkaːm |
| copper | tɔŋ⁵¹ ɛ⁵⁵ | *dɔːŋ |
| drum | kuŋ²⁴ | *kruːŋ |
| house | ȵa⁵⁵ | *ɲaːʔ |
| left side | bɯŋ²¹ vi⁵⁵ | *-ʋeʔ |
| month | sɛ⁵⁵ | *kheʔ |
| pestle | lăm⁵¹ hi⁵¹ | *-reʔ |
| pillow | bu²⁴ kiŋ³³ | *-gɤːŋ |
| right side | bɯŋ²¹ tăm⁵⁵ | *tam |
| road | tiŋ⁵¹ | *ɗeːŋ |
| rope, vine | mɯ⁵¹ | *smɤːʔ |
| weave | tan⁵⁵ | *taːɲ |

== Works cited ==
- Dao, Jie 刀洁 (2007). Bùmáng yǔ yánjiū 布芒语研究 [A Study of Bumang] (in Chinese). Beijing: Minzu chubanshe.
- Edmondson, Jerold A. (2010). "The Kháng Language of Vietnam in Comparison to Ksingmul (Xinh-Mun)". In McElhanon, Kenneth A.; Reesink, Ger (eds.). A Mosaic of Languages and Cultures: Studies Celebrating the Career of Karl J. Franklin. SIL e-Books, 19. SIL International. pp. 138–154.
- Sidwell, Paul (2015). The Palaungic Languages: Classification, Reconstruction and Comparative Lexicon. München: Lincom Europa.
