= Nansan =

Nansan may refer to the following locations in China:

- Nansan, Guangdong (南三镇), town in Potou District, Zhanjiang, Guangdong
- Nansan, Yunnan (南伞镇), town in Zhenkang County, Lincang, Yunnan
