= Riang =

Riang may refer to:

- Riang language of Palaung (Austroasiatic speakers in Myanmar)
- Reang tribe (Sino-Tibetan speakers in India Tripura)
