= Quảng Lâm =

Quảng Lâm may refer to several places in Vietnam, including:

- Quảng Lâm, Cao Bằng, a rural commune of Bảo Lâm District.
- Quảng Lâm, Quảng Ninh, a rural commune of Đầm Hà District.
- Quảng Lâm, Điện Biên, a rural commune of Mường Nhé District.
