= Wa language =

Austroasiatic language spoken in Myanmar and China

Wa
- Va, Vo, Awa
- Region: China, Laos, Myanmar, Thailand
- Ethnicity: Wa
- Native speakers: (900,000 cited 2000–2008)
- Language family: Austroasiatic: Khasi–Palaungic; Palaungic; Waic; Wa
- Writing system: Latin script Formerly: Chinese characters, Shan script

Official status
- Official language in: Wa State

Language codes
- ISO 639-3: Variously: prk – Parauk wbm – Vo vwa – Awa
- Glottolog: waaa1245
- ELP: Wa
- Wa is classified as Severely Endangered by the UNESCO Atlas of the World's Languages in Danger.

Wa (Va) is an Austroasiatic language spoken by the Wa people of Myanmar and China. There are three distinct varieties, sometimes considered separate languages; their names in Ethnologue are Parauk, the majority and standard form; Vo (Zhenkang Wa, 40,000 speakers) and Awa (100,000 speakers), though all may be called Wa, Awa, Va, Vo. David Bradley (1994) estimates there are total of 820,000 Wa speakers.

It is recognized as a state language by the government of Wa State.

== Distribution and variants ==
The extent of linguistic work on Wa creates a superficial impression of diversity, as if it is a family of many small, endangered languages, but the reality is of a strong, resilient and very savvy language community.

— Paul Sidwell, The Palaungic Languages

Gerard Diffloth refers to the Wa geographic region as the "Wa corridor", which lies between the Salween and Mekong Rivers. According to Diffloth, variants include South Wa, "Bible Wa" and Kawa (Chinese Wa).

Christian Wa are more likely to support the use of Standard Wa, since their Bible is based on a standard version of Wa, which is in turn based on the variant spoken in Bang Wai, 150 miles north of Kengtung (Watkins 2002). Bang Wai is located in Northern Shan State, Burma, close to the Chinese border where Cangyuan County is located.

Certain dialects of Wa preserve a final -/s/. They include the variants spoken in Meung Yang and Ximeng County, such as a variety spoken in Zhongke (中课), Masan (马散), Ximeng County that was documented by Zhou & Yan (1984) (Watkins 2002:8).

=== Burma ===
David Bradley estimates that there is a total of about 500,000 Wa speakers in Burma.

A small number of Wa speakers also reside in Taunggyi, Mandalay and Yangon.

=== China ===
The PRC writing system for Wa is based on the Wa variant in Aishuai, Cangyuan County, Yunnan.

David Bradley estimates that there are 322,000 Wa speakers in China. In China, the Wa people live in (Watkins 2002):

- Ximeng County (83% of total)
- Cangyuan County (71% of total)
- Menglian County (over 25% of total; other ethnic groups include the Dai and Lahu)
- Gengma County
- Shuangjiang County
- Lancang County

A small number of Wa speakers also reside in Kunming and throughout various parts of Yunnan.

The three dialects of Wa (and their respective subdialects) according to Zhou et al. (2004) are:

- Baraoke (巴饶克): ~ 250,000 speakers; autonym: pa̠ rauk, pa̠ ɣaɯk
  - Aishi 艾师 subdialect: 218,000 speakers
    - Cangyuan County: Yanshi 岩师, Tuanjie (团结), Mengsheng (勐省), Nuoliang (糯良), Danjia (单甲), Mengjiao (勐角), Menglai (勐来), Yonghe (永和)
    - Shuangjiang County: Shahe (沙河), Mengmeng (勐勐), Nanlang (南榔)
    - Gengma County: Sipaishan (四排山), Gengyi (耿宜), Hepai (贺派), Mengjian (勐简), Mengding (孟定), Furong (付荣)
    - Lancang County: Donghe (东河), Wendong (文东), Shangyun (上允), Xuelin (雪林)
  - Banhong (班洪) subdialect: 35,000 speakers
    - Cangyuan County: Banhong (班洪), Banlao (班老), most of Nanla (南腊)
  - Dazhai (大寨) subdialect: 3,000 speakers
    - Gengma County: Mengjian (勐简), Dazhai (大寨)
- Awa (Ava) (阿佤): ~ 100,000 speakers; autonym: ʔa vɤʔ
  - Masan (马散) subdialect: 60,000 speakers
    - Ximeng County: Mowo (莫窝), Xinchang (新厂), Zhongke (中课), Mengsuo (勐梭), Yuesong (岳宋), Wenggake (翁戛科), parts of Lisuo (力所)
  - Awalai (阿佤来) subdialect: 3,000 speakers
    - Ximeng County: Awalai (阿佤来) in Lisuo (力所)
  - Damangnuo (大芒糯) subdialect: 30,000 speakers
    - Menglian County: Fuyan (富岩), Gongxin (公信), Lalei (腊垒), Nanya (南雅)
    - Ximeng County: parts of Wengjiake 翁戛科)
  - Xiyun (细允) subdialect: 5,000 speakers
    - Lancang County: Xiyun (细允) in Donghui (东回)
    - Menglian County: Shuangbo (双柏) in Mengman (勐满)
- Wa (佤): ~ 40,000 speakers; autonym: vaʔ
  - Yongde County: Dedang (德党), Menggong (孟汞), Minglang (明朗), Mengban (勐板), Yongkang (永康), Dashan (大山)
  - Zhenkang County: Mangbing (忙丙), Muchang (木厂)
  - Cangyuan County: parts of Nanla (南腊)

Jackson Sun (2018a) lists the Awa dialects and their alternate names as follows.

- Masan 馬散 (Lavïa; Ravia; Avë; Avo; etc.). Sun (2018b) documents the Lavïa [la-vɨɒʔ] variety of Banzhe (班哲) (pa-cʰək) Village, Mengka 勐卡 (məŋkʰa) Town in Ximeng County, Yunnan Province. Lavïa of Banzhe is non-tonal and sesquisyllabic.
- Awalai (阿佤來) (Avëloy)
- Damangnuo (大芒糯) (Vo)
- Xiyun (細允) (Va [vàʔ]). Sun (2018a) documents the Va variety of Yingla (英臘) (zoŋráʔ) Village, Wenggake (翁嘎科) Township, Ximeng (西盟) County, Pu'er (普洱) City, Yunnan Province. Va of Yingla is monosyllabic has 3 tones, which are high, mid and low. Sun (2018a) notes that the Va varieties of Yingla and neighboring villages in Wenggake (翁戛科) Township of Ximeng County belong to the same dialect as varieties spoken farther away in Donghui (东回) and Nuofu (糯福) Townships, Lancang County.

The Dai exonym for the Wa of Yongde, Zhenkang and Nanla (南腊) is la³¹. In Sipsongpanna, the Dai call them the va¹¹, va¹¹ dip⁵⁵ ("Raw Va" (生佤)), va¹¹ ʔău⁵⁵ho⁵⁵ ("Head-carrying Wa" (拿头佤)), va¹¹ sə⁵⁵să⁵⁵na⁵³ ("Religious Wa" (信教佤)). In Ximeng and Menglian counties, the Wa autonym is xa³¹va⁵³, while in Cangyuan and Gengma counties it is xa³¹va⁵³lɒi⁵³ (Zhou, et al. 2004:2).

Yan and Zhou (2012:138) list the following names for Wa in various counties.

- pa̠ rauk, pa̠ɣaɯk (巴饶克): in Lancang, Gengma, Shuangjiang, Lancang counties; exonyms: Small Kawa (小卡瓦), Kawa (卡瓦), Cooked Ka (熟卡), Lajia (腊家)
- vaʔ (佤): in Zhenkang and Yongde counties; exonyms: Benren (本人)
- vɔʔ (斡), ʔa vɤʔ (阿卫), rɤ viaʔ (日佤): in Ximeng and Menglian counties; exonyms: Big Kawa 大卡瓦, Raw Ka 生卡, Wild Ka 野卡
- xa³¹va⁵³lɒi⁵³ (卡瓦来): in Cangyuan and Gengma counties; also called va⁵³ (瓦)

A language known as Bujiao (补角) (autonym: Puga, 仆嘎) in Mengla County was mentioned in Yunnan (1960) The Bujiao were classified as ethnic Bulang and had a population of 212 in 1960.

The Kela (克拉) (Dai exonym: Kala (卡拉); population: 393 people) live in District 3 三区 of Tengchong County (腾冲县), Yunnan (You 2013:359). The Kela used to speak a variety of Wa, but now speak only Chinese. The Kela also refer to themselves as the Wama (佤妈).

=== Thailand ===
Wa have also migrated to Thailand in the past several decades, mainly from Burma. There are about 10,000 Wa speakers in Thailand. Wa villages can be found in (Watkins 2002:6):

- Mae Sai District, Chiang Rai Province, close to the Burmese border
- Mae Yao subdistrict near Chiang Rai City
- Wiang Pa Pao District, in southern Chiang Rai Province
- Chiang Dao District, Chiang Mai Province

== Phonology ==
=== Standard Wa (Bible Wa) ===
Standard Wa is a non-tonal language. However, tone has developed in some of the dialects. There is correspondence between tones in tonal dialects and tenseness in non-tonal dialects.

In Wa, there are 44 phonemes; 35 consonants and 9 vowels. All of these vowels can be tense or lax. Tenseness is a phonemic feature in syllables with unaspirated initials.

==== Vowels ====
	Front	Back	
	Front	unr.	rnd.
Close	i	ɯ	u
Close-mid	e	ɤ	o
Open-mid	ɛ		ɔ
Open	a		

There are 15 diphthongs /iu, ɯi, ui, ia, ɤi, ua, ei, ou, oi~ɔi, ai, aɯ, au/ and 2 triphthongs /iau, uai/. The general syllabic structure of Wa is C(C)(V)V(V)(C). Only a few words have zero-initials.

==== Consonants ====
			Labial	Alveolar	Palatal	Velar	Glottal
Nasal		voiced	m	n	ɲ	ŋ	
Nasal		murmured	mʱ	nʱ	ɲʱ	ŋʱ	
Plosive	oral	tenuis	p	t	c	k	ʔ
Plosive	oral	aspirated	pʰ	tʰ	cʰ	kʰ	
Plosive	prenasal	voiced	ᵐb	ⁿd	ᶮɟ	ᵑɡ	
Plosive	prenasal	murmured	ᵐbʱ	ⁿdʱ	ᶮɟʱ	ᵑɡʱ	
Fricative		voiceless		s			h
Fricative		voiced	v				
Fricative		murmured	vʱ				
Approximant		voiced		l	j		
Approximant		murmured		lʱ	jʱ		
Trill		voiced		r			
Trill		murmured		rʱ			

=== Xiyun Va ===
The Waic variety in Yingla (英臘) (zoŋráʔ) Village, Wenggake Township, Ximeng County, Pu'er City, Yunnan documented by Sun (2018a) shows substantial differences from Bible Wa in various phonological aspects. Va of Xiyun is monosyllabic and tonal. The maximal phonological template can be described as C_{1}.ˈC_{i}(C_{m})V(V)(C_{f})^{T}.

==== Consonants ====
Va onsets
		Labial	Alveolar	Palatal	Velar	Glottal
Nasal		m	n	ɲ	ŋ	
Plosive	tenuis	p	t	c	k	ʔ
Plosive	aspirated	pʰ	tʰ	cʰ	kʰ	
Fricative	voiceless		s			h
Fricative	voiced	v	z			
Approximant			l r			

The dental spirant onset /s/ is palatalized before a vowel cluster with an /i/ onglide. /c/ is a voiceless alveolo-palatal affricate [t͡ɕ]. Onset /h/ may be realized as a velar [x] or uvular [χ]. /r/ is always heard as a retroflex fricative [ʐ] or glide [ɻ]. The language has the following complex onsets: /pl- pr- kl- kr- pʰl- pʰr- kʰl kʰr- npl- npr- nkl- nkr-/.

Va codas
	Bilabial	Alveolar	Palatal	Velar	Glottal
Nasal	m	n	ɲ	ŋ	
Plosive	p	t	c	k	ʔ
Continuant	w		j	ɣ̞	h

==== Vowels ====
Xiyun Va vowels
	Front	Central	Back
Close	i	ɨ	u
Mid	e		o
Open	ɛ	a	ɔ
Diphthong	ia		ua

==== Suprasegmentals (tones) ====
Xiyun Va exhibits three tones: high, mid, and low. The mid tone is unmarked.

- ɣáŋ (H): 'tooth'
- ɣaŋ (M): 'rock'
- ɣàŋ (L): 'bright'

=== Lavïa ===
Lavïa (lavɨɒʔ) or Masan 馬散 of is often assumed to be a Wa dialect, however this is misleading; according to investigation by Sun (2018b), it is a distinct language. Sun (2018b) provides a phonological sketch and a wordlist of the Lavïa variety spoken in Banzhe village, Mengka Township, Ximeng County. Like Bible Wa, Lavïa word structure is sesquisyllabic. In disyllables, stress falls at the final syllables (second syllables), preceded by a unstressed minor syllable. This iambic pattern is also found in compound words, although the first compound elements could be heavy. No tones or registers are reported.

==== Consonants ====
Lavïa onsets
		Labial	Alveolar	Palatal	Velar	Glottal
Nasal	voiceless	m̥	n̥	ɲ̊	ŋ̊	
Nasal	voiced	m	n	ɲ	ŋ	
Plosive	tenuis	p	t	c	k	ʔ
Plosive	aspirated	pʰ	tʰ	cʰ	kʰ	
Fricative	voiceless	f	s			h
Fricative	voiced	v	z			
Approximant		w	l			
Vibrant			r			

- /s/ and /z/ are realized alveolo-palatal before /i/.
- Palatal onset series /c cʰ nc ncʰ/ are pronounced as alveolo-palatal before /i/; with other rimes, they fluctuate between alveolar and alveolo-palatal.
- /h/ is a velar [x] or uvular fricative [χ].
- /r/ is usually a pre-voiced tap [ᵊɾ-] in word-initial position.
- /v/ can be heard as labiodental [v] or bilabial [β].

Lavïa has a very large number of onset clusters, consisting of three major types: stop-glide, n-clusters, and few cases with hl- [ɬl], hr- [χɾ], mr- [mɾ] clusters. The homorganic nasal element in n-clusters appears to be a separate morpheme used in derivation instead of being prenasalized stops.

Lavïa codas
	Bilabial	Alveolar	Palatal	Velar	Glottal
Nasal	m	n	ɲ	ŋ	
Plosive	p	t	c	k	ʔ
Fricative		s			h

==== Vowels ====
Lavïa monophthongs
	Front	Central	Back
Close	i	ɨ	u
Mid	e	ə	o
Open-mid	ɛ	ə	ɔ
Open		a	ɒ

There are two types of diphthongs: rising /ia, ie, iə, ɨɒ, ua, uo/ and falling /ai, ui, oi, ɔi, ɒi, əi, ɨi, au, iu/. Additionally, Lavïa has three triphthongs /iau, uoi, uai/. Offglides /i/ and /u/ in the falling diphthongs can be alternatively analyzed as codas /j/ and /w/, respectively.

== Script ==
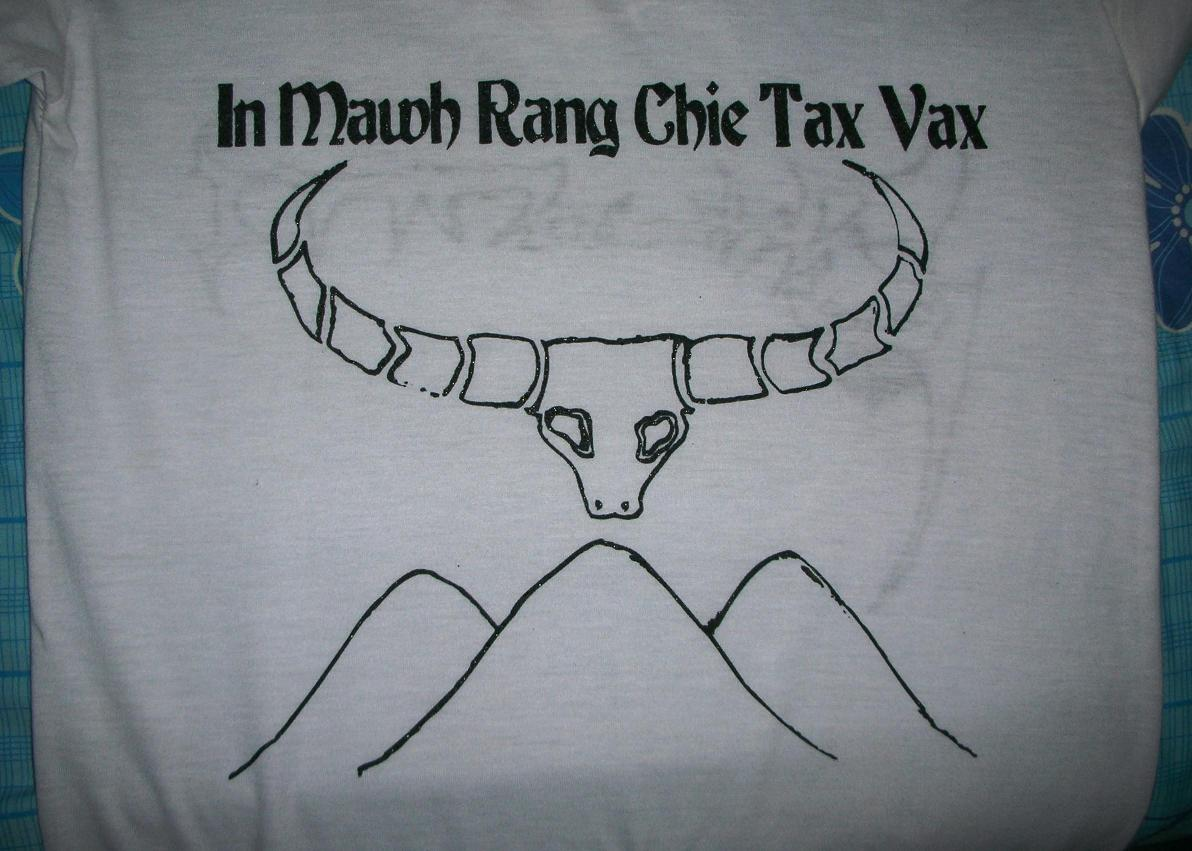
Wa writing and cultural symbols on a T-shirt

The Wa language formerly had no script and some of the few Wa that were literate used Chinese characters, while others used the Shan language and its script. Christian missionary work among the Wa began at the beginning of the 20th century first in the Burmese and later in the Chinese areas of the Wa territory. It was led by William Marcus Young, from Nebraska. The first transcription of the Wa language was devised by Young and Sara Yaw Shu Chin (Joshua) in 1931 with the purpose of translating the Bible. This first Wa alphabet was based on the Latin script and the very first publication was a compilation of Wa hymns in 1933, the Wa New Testament being completed in 1938. This transcription, known as Bible orthography, is known as lǎowǎwén (老佤文) old Wa orthography in Chinese, and is now used mainly in the Burmese Wa areas and among the Wa in Thailand through the materials published by the Wa Welfare Society (Cub Yuh Bwan Ka son Vax, Cub Pa Yuh Phuk Lai Vax, Phuk Lai Hak Tiex Vax) in Chiang Mai.

In 1956, a transcription adapted to the new pinyin romanization, known as new Wa orthography, "PRC orthography" or "Chinese orthography", was developed for the Wa people in China. However, its publications, mainly propagated through the Yunnan administration, are yet to reach a wider public beyond academics. This transcription, which originally included even a couple of letters of the Cyrillic script, has also since been revised. Despite the revisions, both the Chinese and the Bible orthography are still marred by inconsistencies.

Recently, a revised Bible orthography adopting some features from the Chinese orthography has been adopted as Wa State Wa orthography or "official Wa spelling" by the central authorities of the Wa State in Pangkham which have published a series of primers in order to improve the literacy of the United Wa State Army troops. Also, after 2000 Wa people in social networks such as Facebook, as well as Wa songwriters in karaoke lyrics of Wa songs, use this Myanmar (revised Bible) orthography in its main variations. The Wa Women's Association promotes the use of the script.

Wa Bible Orthography
WBO	IPA	WBO	IPA	WBO	IPA	WBO	IPA	WBO	IPA	WBO	IPA
p	[p]	bh	[ᵐbʱ]	nh	[nʰ]	rh	[rʰ]	o	[o]	e	[ei]
ph	[pʰ]	d	[ⁿd]	ny	[ɲ]	y	[j]	ie	[ɛ]	o	[ou]
t	[t]	dh	[ⁿdʱ]	nyh	[ɲʰ]	yh	[jʰ]	aw	[ɔ]	oi, oe, we	[oi~ɔi]
th	[tʰ]	j	[ᶮɟ]	ng	[ŋ]	l	[l]	a	[a]	ai	[ai]
c	[c]	jh	[ᶮɟʱ]	ngh	[ŋʰ]	lh	[lʰ]	iu	[iu]	au	[aɯ]
ch	[cʰ]	g	[ᵑg]	s	[s]	i	[i]	eei, ui	[ɯi]	au, ao	[au]
k	[k]	gh	[ᵑgʱ]	h	[h]	ee	[ɯ]	ui, wi	[ui]	iao	[iau]
kh	[kʰ]	m	[m]	v	[v]	u	[u]	ia	[ia]	oe	[uai]
x	[ʔ]	mh	[mʰ]	vh, f	[vʱ]	e	[e]	eue	[ɤi]		
b	[ᵐb]	n	[n]	r	[r]	eu	[ɤ]	ua, wa	[ua]		

== Lexicon ==
=== Numerals ===
Comparison of numerals from three Wa varieties with Proto-Palaungic reconstructions by Sidwell (2015).

Gloss	Bible Wa	Xiyun Va	Lavïa	Proto-Palaungic
1	ti̤ʔ	tʰèʔ	ti ~ tə/tʰeʔ	*diːʔ
2	ra	ra	ra ~ raʔa	*ləʔaːr
3	loi	ʔɔj	luai ~ la-ʔuai	*ləʔɔːj
4	pon	pun	pɔn	*poːn
5	pʰuan	pʰɔ́n	pʰuan	*pəsan
6	li̤ah	liàh	les	*lɛs (Proto-Waic)
7	ʔa li̤ah	ʔa liàh	ʔales	*ʔar-lɛs (Proto-Waic)
8	daiʔ	tɛʔ	si-tɛʔ	*taːʔ
9	s.dim	tim	sitɛm	*tiːm
10	kaɔ	ku	kau	*kɤːl
100	s.ji̤ɛh	tʰèʔ zàh	kɛɲ	*prjah
1000	rʰeŋ	híŋ	hrɛɲ	*sreːŋ

=== Body parts ===
Gloss	Bible Wa	Xiyun Va	Lavïa	Proto-Palaungic
arm, hand	taiʔ	màʔ kɨʔ tɛʔ	nplɛʔ tɛʔ	*tiːʔ
belly, stomach	tṳ	tʰù	katʰu	*kəɗɤl
blood	nʰam	nám	n̥am	*snaːm
bone	sʔaŋ	ʔaŋ	si-ʔaŋ	*cəʔaːŋ
breast	tɯih	tɨh	təs	*tuːs
claw, nail	ŋʰim	ɲim tɛʔ	ŋ̊em	*rəmsiːm
ear	jʰaɔk	zók	lahiauk	*ʰjoːk
eye	ŋai	ŋaj	ŋai	*ˀŋaːj
foot	tɕa̤ɔŋ	sòŋ	cʰuoŋ	*ɟɤːŋ
hair	haɯk	hɨ́k	hac ntɔŋ	*suk
heart	rʰɔm	rúm	rahɔm/hrɔm	*pəsɤːm
joint	dʑʰoŋ	ʔaŋ lùc	siʔaŋ ruc	*-caŋ
liver	tɔm	tɔm	katɒm	*kətɔːm
nose	mɯ̤ih	mɨ̀h	mɨs	*muːs
rib	praɔk	ʔaŋ prok	siʔaŋ prauk	*prɤːk
tail	sdaʔ	taʔ	sitaʔ	*sntaʔ
tongue	dak	tak	ntak	*-taːk

=== Fauna ===
Gloss	Bible Wa	Xiyun Va	Lavïa	Proto-Palaungic
ant	mɯc	mɨc	məc	*smuːc
bear	krih	krɨh	kres	*kreːs
bee	hia	hía	hia	*pəsiɛr
bird	sim	sím	sem	*ciːm
buffalo	krak	krak	krak	*traːk
cat		nɛ̀	miau	*miɛw
civet	spao, sbao	suá	sua	*car
crab	tam	tam	katam	*kətaːm
deer	tɕak	cak	cak	*tjaːk
dog	soʔ	sóʔ	sɔʔ	*cɔːʔ
dove/pigeon	sgaɯʔ	kɨʔ	kukɛ	*kuːʔ
fowl	ʔia	ʔia	ʔia	*ʔiɛr
horse	brṳŋ	npruàŋ	npruoŋ	*mraŋ
louse	siʔ	síʔ	seʔ	*ciːʔ
monkey	vʰaʔ	váʔ	faʔ	*sʋaʔ
pig	li̤c	lìk	lik	*-leːk
muntjac	poih	puh	pɔs	*poːs
termite/ant	grɯ̤ɲ	nkrɨ̀ɲ	nkrɨɲ	*ŋruːɲ
tiger	sva̤i	vàj	ʔavie	*rəʋaːj
turtle	rɯ̤ih	pʰrùʔ pʰràʔ	rɨs	*ruːs

=== Flora & nature ===
Gloss	Bible Wa	Xiyun Va	Lavïa	Proto-Palaungic
black	lṳaŋ	luàŋ	loŋ	*laŋ
earth	tɛʔ	tɛʔ	katɛʔ	*kəteːʔ
(to) flower		tʰàj krɔ	pros	*po/uːh
fruit	pliʔ	pliʔ kʰóʔ	plɛʔ	*pleeʔ
gold	kʰri	kʰí	si	*criːl
green/bright yellow	sŋi	ŋà	siŋɨɒ	*cəŋaːl
leaf	lʰaʔ	láʔ	hlaʔ	*hlaʔ
millet/Job's tears	sbi̤ʔ	ku ʔeɲ sóʔ	sipʰeʔ	*səɓeʔ
foxtail millet	kɔi	kɔj	kʰɒʔ	*səkɔːj
moon	kʰiʔ	kʰíʔ	kʰɛʔ	*kʰeʔ
pine (torch)	gi̤ʔ	kʰìʔ	ŋkʰiʔ	*-geʔ
pumpkin/melon/squash	bi	piɣ nùm	npiu num	*-piːr
rain	li̤h lʰɛʔ	lɛ́ʔ	hlɛʔ	*cleːʔ
rainbow ~ dragon	sjɔ̤ŋ	ɲɨ̀ʔ zɔ̀ŋ	ʔazuoŋ	*brjɔ(ː)ŋ
rice (husked)	gaɔʔ	koʔ	nkauʔ	*rəŋkoːʔ
rice grain/rice tree	ŋʰoʔ	ŋóʔ kɨŋ	ŋ̊ɔʔ	*sŋɔːʔ
rice (bran)	kam	kam	kam pazua	*səkaːm
river	klɔŋ	klɔŋ	klɒŋ	*klɔŋ
star	simʔuɲ	sím ʔuɲ	semʔoɲ	*səˀmɤɲ
sand	mʰac	mác	m̥ac	*-saːc
tea	miɛm	(là)	(la)	*miɛm

=== Tools and concepts ===
Gloss	Bible Wa	Xiyun Va	Lavïa	Proto-Palaungic
axe	moi		mɔi	*ˀmɤːj
bow, crossbow	ʔak	ʔak	ʔak ʔom	*ʔaːk
charcoal	suah	suáh	kasuas	*kətsas
copper	tɔ̤ŋ	(làt)	(lavun)	*dɔːŋ
door	svɛ̤ʔ	vàʔ	ʔavɨɒʔ	*rəʋaːʔ
drum	kraɯŋ	krɨŋ	kraɲ	*kruːŋ
field	ma	ma ròk	ma ruok	*ˀmaːr
house	ɲa̤ʔ	ɲàʔ	ɲɨɒʔ	*ɲaːʔ
iron		rɛ́m	hriam	*rəŋɔ/aŋ
knife	va̤c	vàc	viec	*ʋaːc
left side	guaʔ	kraʔ vɛ̀ʔ	kaʔ veʔ	*-ʋeʔ
mortar	po	po	pɔ	*pal
pestle	gri̤ʔ	nkrìʔ	ŋkriʔ	*-reʔ
right side	dɔm	kraʔ tom	katɔm	*stam
wall	diɲ	tiŋ	ntiaŋ	*ti(ː)ŋ
war	na̤ɲ	(puɲ)	nieɲ	*naːɲ
weave	taɲ	taɲ	taɲ	*taːɲ
wet field/paddy	kaɯŋ	kɨŋ	kaɲ	*kuːŋ
wheel	kliɲ	lìŋ	ʔaliaŋ	*leːŋ
winnowing basket	bia	pia	npia	*piɛr

== See also ==
- Wa people
