= Kháng language =

Austroasiatic language spoken in Vietnam

Kháng
- Mang U'
- Native to: Vietnam
- Region: Sơn La and Lai Châu provinces
- Ethnicity: Khang
- Native speakers: 14,000 (2009 census)
- Language family: Austroasiatic: Khasi–Palaungic; Palaungic; Bit–Khang; Kháng

Language codes
- ISO 639-3: kjm – inclusive code Individual code: xao – Khao
- Glottolog: khan1274
- ELP: Kháng

Kháng (Chinese: 抗语), also known as Mang U', is an Austroasiatic language of Vietnam. It is closely related to the Bumang language of southern Yunnan, China.

== Classification ==
Paul Sidwell (2014) classifies Khang as Palaungic, although Jerold Edmondson (2010) suggests it is Khmuic.

Kháng is most closely related to Bumang (Edmondson 2010).

== Distribution ==
Kháng speakers are an officially recognized ethnic group in Vietnam, and officially numbered 10,272 in 1999.

The Kháng are distributed in the following districts of northwest Vietnam in Sơn La Province and Lai Châu Province:

- Sơn La Province (along the Black River)
  - Thuận Châu (including Bản Ná Lai village)
  - Quỳnh Nhai
  - Mường La
- Lai Châu Province
  - Phong Thổ
  - Mường Tè
  - Than Uyên
- Điện Biên Province
  - Mường Lay (alternatively Mường Chà)
  - Tuần Giáo

Tạ (2021) contains a phonology and word list of the Kháng dialect of Nậm Mu village, Phình Sáng commune, Tuần Giáo district, Điện Biên province.

== Phonology ==
=== Consonants ===
Onsets /kʰw, sw, hw/, and coda /ɰ/ are apparently limited to borrowings (Vietnamese and Tai).

==== Onsets ====
Khang onsets
		Labial	Alveolar	Palatal	Velar	Glottal
Plosive	plain	p	t	c	k	ʔ
Plosive	aspirated	pʰ	tʰ		kʰ	
Plosive	voiced	b	d			
Fricative	voiceless	f	s	(ʃ)	(x)	h
Fricative	voiced	v	z			
Nasal		m	n	ɲ	ŋ	
Lateral			l			

==== Codas ====
Khang codas
	Bilabial	Alveolar	Palatal	Velar	Glottal
Plosive	p	t		k	ʔ
Nasal	m	n		ŋ	
Lateral		l			
Approximant	w		j	(ɰ)	

=== Vowels ===
Khang vowels
	Front	Central	Back
Close	i	ɯ	u
Mid	e	ə	o
Open	ɛ	ă, a	ɔ
Diphthongs	[iə]	[ɯə]	[uə]

Additionally, the following diphthongs can be found: /iɤ/, /ɯɤ/, /uɤ/.

=== Suprasegmentals ===
Kháng also has eight tones in total, six of which appear on "live syllables" - open syllables or syllables ending with sonorants, and the other two are limited to "dead syllables" - syllables ending in the oral stops /p t k/. Each tone also carries with it a specific register affecting the phonation of the syllable.

The live syllable tones are as follows:

- [ ˥ ] - high, level, modal voice
- [ ˩ˀ] - low, level, ending in a glottal stop
- [ ˧˥ˀ] - high-rising, ending in a glottal stop
- [ ˧˩ˀ] - low-falling, ending in a glottal stop
- [ ˧˨˧ ] - mid-dipping, modal voice
- [ ˨˩˨ ] - low-dipping, creaky voice

The dead syllable tones are as follows:

- [ ˦˧ ] - high-falling
- [ ˩˨ ] - low-rising

=== Syllable structure ===
The Khang lexicon is dominated by monosyllables though di- and trisyllabic compound words are common. The maximal word template is C_{i}(C_{m})V(C_{f})^{T}.

== Vocabulary ==
=== Pronouns ===
The ʔaj⁴ and ʔem¹ forms in Kháng were derived from Tai Dam lexemes for "mother" and "father".

		singular	plural
1st person	exclusive	zɔ¹	mo¹zɔ¹
1st person	inclusive	zɔ¹	mot²dia¹
2nd person	unmarked	mi¹	
2nd person	masculine	ʔaj⁴	pɯŋ³ʔaj⁴
2nd person	feminine	ʔem¹	pɯŋ³ʔem¹
2nd person	honorific	luaŋ⁴	pɯŋ³luaŋ⁴
3rd person	feminine	ko¹	pɯŋ³ʔem¹ni¹
3rd person	masculine	ŋa¹	pɯŋ³ʔaj⁴ni¹
3rd person	unmarked		ke¹

=== Body parts ===
Gloss	Kháng	proto-Palaungic
arm, hand	ti²	*tiːʔ
armpit	ka⁴ ʔɔ²	*kəldoːʔ
bone	tăk⁴ ʔɯŋ²	*cəʔaːŋ
breast	boʔ⁴	*ɓuːʔ
ear	tol³	*toːr
face	ŋaj²	*ˀŋaːj ('eye')
foot	zɯŋ²	*ɟɤːŋ
knee	ka⁴ hoŋ²	*groːŋ
nose	moj¹	*muːs
penis	klɛ¹	*kleʔ
tooth	hɯŋ¹	*sraːŋ
tongue	ka⁴ tak²	*-taːk

=== Fauna ===
Gloss	Kháng	proto-Palaungic
bird	cem²	*ciːm
cat	mɛw²	*miɛw
crow	ka⁴ ʔak²	*kə(l)ʔaːk
dog	cua¹	*cɔːʔ
fowl	zial¹	*ʔiɛr
fish	ka¹	*kaʔ
monkey	swa¹	*sʋaʔ
louse	ce²	*ciːʔ

=== Flora & nature ===
Gloss	Kháng	proto-Palaungic
earth	tia¹	*kəteːʔ
fire	ŋal²	*ŋal
grass	băt²	*ɓat
old, ancient	fem²	*priːm
potato, taro	kwaj² ŋo¹	*sŋɔːʔ 'paddy rice'
rain	klia¹	*cleːʔ
rice	năŋ⁴ kɔ¹	*rəŋkoːʔ
smoke	təʔ²	tɤːʔ
star	căk² men²	*səˀmɤɲ
sun	ŋaj² ŋe²	cəŋiːʔ
water	ʔɔm²	*ʔoːm

=== Tools and concepts ===
Gloss	Kháng	proto-Palaungic
drum	klɔŋ¹	*klɔːŋ
knife, penknife	vaʔ⁴	*ʋaːc
left side	faj¹ ve²	*-ʋeʔ
right side	faj¹ tăm²	*tam
road	ka⁴ deŋ²	*ɗeːŋ
rope, string	ka⁴ mɯj²	*smɤːʔ
weave	tan²	*taːɲ

== Sources ==
- Mikami, Naomitsu (2003), "A Khang phonology and wordlist", in Ueda Hiromi (ed.), Reports on Minority Languages in Mainland Southeast Asia, Endangered Languages of the Pacific Rim, Osaka: Faculty of Informatics, Osaka Gakuin University, pp. 1–42
- Sidwell, Paul (2015). The Palaungic Languages: Classification, Reconstruction and Comparative Lexicon. München: Lincom Europa.
