= International Conference on Austroasiatic Linguistics =

Biennial academic conference

International Conference on Austroasiatic Linguistics (ICAAL)
- Status: Active
- Frequency: Annual (since 2021); biennial (up to 2019)
- Years active: 1973–1979; 2006–present
- People: Paul Sidwell
- Website: icaal.net

The International Conference on Austroasiatic Linguistics (ICAAL) is an academic conference that focuses on research in Austroasiatic languages and linguistics.

== History ==
The first ICAAL conference was held at the University of Hawaiʻi in Honolulu, Hawaii, United States on the first week of January in 1973. After 1979, conferences were no longer held for over 25 years as much of Southeast Asia was inaccessible to Western researchers during many of those years.

On August 30, 2001, in Périgueux, France, interest in reviving ICAAL was rekindled when Gérard Diffloth, Michel Ferlus, and George van Driem met to discuss the history and potential future of ICAAL. They then went on to host the ICAAL 3 Pilot Meeting in June 2006 at Siem Reap, Cambodia, which was funded by the Dutch Research Council and the École française d'Extrême-Orient. The ICAAL 3 academic conference was held at the Deccan College Post-Graduate and Research Institute in Pune, India in November 2007, and conferences have since been held biannually. In 2011, ICAAL 5 was scheduled to be held from November 9–11, 2011, at Mahidol University in Bangkok, Thailand, but the conference was cancelled due to the 2011 Thailand floods. ICAAL 5 was thus postponed to 2013 and held at the Australian National University.

== List of meetings ==
A full list of meetings, including full conferences, workshops, and other meetings, is as follows.

Year	Event	Host	City	Country	Dates	Notes
1973	ICAAL 1	University of Hawaiʻi	Honolulu	United States	January (first week)	
1978	ICAAL 2	Central Institute of Indian Languages	Mysore	India	December	
1979	Symposium on Austroasiatic Linguistics	International People's College	Helsingør	Denmark	October 24–26	
2006	ICAAL Pilot Meeting	École Française d'Extrême-Orient	Siem Reap	Cambodia	June 28–29	
2007	ICAAL 3	Deccan College Post-Graduate and Research Institute	Pune	India	November 26–28	
2009	ICAAL 4	Mahidol University	Bangkok	Thailand	October 29–30	
2013	ICAAL 5	Australian National University	Canberra	Australia	September	postponed from 2011
2015	ICAAL 6	Royal Academy of Cambodia and Center for Khmer Studies	Siem Reap	Cambodia	July 29–31	
2016	Austroasiatic Syntax in Areal and Diachronic Perspective workshop	Chiang Mai University	Chiang Mai	Thailand	September 5–7	
2017	ICAAL 7	Christian-Albrechts-Universität zu Kiel	Kiel	Germany	September 29 – October 1	
2019	ICAAL 8	Chiang Mai University	Chiang Mai	Thailand	August 29–31	
2021	ICAAL 9	Lund University	Lund	Sweden	November 18–19	held online
2022	ICAAL 10	Living Tongues Institute	Salem, Oregon	United States	November 30–December 2	held online
2023	ICAAL 11	Chiang Mai University	Chiang Mai	Thailand	October 26–27	held online
2024	ICAAL 12	Payap University	Chiang Mai	Thailand	October 23–25	hybrid (in-person and online)
2025	ICAAL 13	–	–	–	October 29–31	held online
2026	ICAAL 14	Nguyen Tat Thanh University	Ho Chi Minh City	Vietnam	November 27–29	

== Proceedings ==
Conference proceedings:

- Second International Conference on Austroasiatic Linguistics (SICAL). (Archived mss)
- Papers from the Helsingør symposium on Austroasiatic linguistics and literature. (Archived mss)
- Nagaraja, K.S., and Kashyap Mankodi. 2007. Austroasiatic linguistics: proceedings of Third International Conference of Austroasiatic Linguistics, November 26–28, 2007. Mysore: Central Institute of Indian Languages, Mysore. ISBN 81-7342-174-9
- Ring, Hiram; Rau, Felix, eds. (2018). "Papers from the Seventh International Conference on Austroasiatic Linguistics". University of Hawaiʻi Press. ISSN 1836-6821.

== See also ==
- List of linguistics conferences
- International Conference on Sino-Tibetan Languages and Linguistics
