= Kháng people =

Ethnic group

Kháng
Total population
- Vietnam 16,180 (2019)

Regions with significant populations
- Vietnam : Sơn La, Lai Châu

Languages
- Kháng • Vietnamese

Religion
- Animism

The Kháng people ( Vietnamese: Kháng) are an Austro-Asian people of northwestern Vietnam.

== Etymology ==
The Kháng people also called as Haang, Ksakhao, Ksasua, Ksadon, Ksadaeng, Ksahoc, Ksaai, Ksabung, Quanglam, Bren, Ksakautenh, Putheng, Tayhay.

== History ==
Most Khaang live in the Sơn La and Lai Châu provinces of northwestern Vietnam. Khang subgroups include Kháng Dẩng, Kháng Hoặc, Kháng Dón, Kháng Súa, Ma Háng, Bư Háng, Ma Háng Bẻng, and Bư Háng Cọi.

Their cuisine is known for its hot and sour dishes, and they have the custom of drinking by the nose (Khang language: tu mui). They celebrate Xen Pang Ả festival.

In 2019 their population was 16,180.
