= Danau language =

Austroasiatic language spoken in Burma

Danau (Htanaw)
- Kənɒ̀, Thanɔ, Htanaw ကနော်, ထနော့
- Native to: Burma
- Ethnicity: 5,000 (2000)
- Native speakers: 3,000 (2023)
- Language family: Austroasiatic: Khasi–Palaungic; Palaungic; Danau (Htanaw)
- Writing system: Burmese-based orthography

Language codes
- ISO 639-3: dnu
- Glottolog: dana1252
- ELP: Danau

Danau, also spelled Htanaw or Danaw (Burmese: ထနော့ [tʰənɔ̰], endonym: ကနော် [kənɒ̀]), is an Austroasiatic language of Myanmar (Burma). It is the most divergent member of the Palaungic branch (Sidwell 2010). According to community estimates (2023), Danau is spoken by about 3,000 people in six villages near Aungban, Kalaw Township, Shan State. Danau was described as a "critically endangered" language in UNESCO's 2010 Atlas of the World’s Languages in Danger.

== Name ==
Danau [dənɔ] is the most common English form of the ethnonym; the Danau themselves pronounce the name of their ethnic group and language as [kənɒ̀]. The meaning and origin of the name are unknown. Zaw Lwin Oo (2021:35) states that the endonym kənɒ̀ means 'the people who like to live peacefully' (အေးအေးဆေးဆေး နေတတ်သောလူမျိုး). This etymology of the name is unknown to the native speakers, though, and no related word is found in the present-day language.

== Speakers ==
The Danau are a little known ethnic group in Myanmar. Even in the nearby town of Aungban, it is common for people to confuse this group with the local Danu majority. According to historical accounts, the Danu had served as archers for King Alaungpaya, who founded the Konbaung Dynasty in the 18th century. The Danu settled in the Pindaya region after returning from wars in Thailand, and speak a variant of Burmese that is characterized by minor differences in pronunciation. The Danau, on the other hand speak a completely different Austroasiatic language, which nevertheless has numerous words borrowed from Burmese (and also ultimately from Pali via Burmese).

The Danau live primarily in the villages of Taungpohla, Thaethit, Htinyugon, Chaunggya and Naung In, within a short distance of the towns of Aungban and Heho. As these villages are surrounded by Pa'O villages, Danau people tend to speak Pa'O as well as Burmese (and the Burmese varieties Intha and Taungyoe). In spite of the small size of the Danau-speaking population, the language is vigorous and being taught to children. The current situation is in contrast to the prediction made by the linguist Gordon H. Luce in 1965, when he called Danau a 'dying' language. The Danau people are primarily farmers, growing sesame, turmeric, ginger, chili, groundnut and potato for local consumption and for sale at nearby markets.

== Writing system ==
Danau has no traditional orthography. Speakers use ad-hoc Burmese and Pa'O inspired spelling to represent their language in informal situations, especially on social media and karaoke videos. Since 2020, a systematic way of writing Danau in Burmese script has been developed by members of the language community in cooperation with a team of international linguists. The finalized version of the new orthography is currently (July 2025) being applied by the speakers. A first primer was published in 2025.

== Grammatical structure ==
Danau has a basic SVO clause structure, with free omission of known or contextually retrievable elements. The internal structure of phrases is inconsistent in terms of head and dependent arrangements, showing influence from verb-final Tibeto-Burman, especially Burmese, and equally mixed Karenic Pa'O. Grammatical and semantic relations are expressed by both pre- and postpositions, clausal and verbal modifiers (relative clauses and "adjectives") can precede or follow the noun they modify.

Danau is an isolating, topic-prominent language. The topic marking enclitic =nə (alternatively =kɐ̄) is used frequently in both Danau discourse and elicited utterances.

== Vocabulary ==
The basic vocabulary of Danau is clearly Palaungic (Austroasiatic), although the language contains a large number of words that are either borrowed from neighboring languages such as Burmese/Intha, Pa'O, and Shan, or of unknown origin. An online dictionary is currently being compiled and continuously expanded.

== Phonology ==
=== Consonants ===
Danau has a three-way distinction in plosive onsets: voiceless (/k, c, t, p, ʔ/), voiceless-aspirate (/kʰ, cʰ, tʰ, pʰ/) implosive (only /ɗ/ and /ɓ/). Sonorants found in onset position are /ŋ, ɲ, n, m, j, r, l, w/v. Unlike Burmese, Danau does not have voiceless/aspirated sonorants. Fricatives are /s, sʰ, and h/. In coda position, only /ʔ/, /h/, and /ɴ/ are distinguished, although some speakers retain apparently more conservative pronunciations with specified place of articulation (/k, t, p/ and /ŋ, n, m/) in some words. There is much individual variation in words like ʔùɴ 'water', which may be pronounced as ʔùn, ʔũ̀, or ʔùm by different speakers. Onset clusters are frequent, combining stops or fricatives with liquids (j, r, l, w).

==== Initials ====
Consonants
		Bilabial	Dental/ Alveolar	Postalv./ Palatal	Velar	Glottal
Plosive	voiceless	p	t	c	k	ʔ
Plosive	aspirated	pʰ	tʰ	t͡ʃʰ	kʰ	
Plosive	voiced	b	d		ɡ	
Implosive		ɓ	ɗ			
Fricative	voiceless	(f)	s, sʰ	ç	x	h
Fricative	voiced	v	z			
Affricate	voiceless			t͡ʃ		
Affricate	voiced			d͡ʒ		
Nasal		m	n	ɲ	ŋ	
Approximant				j	w	
Flap/Trill			r			
Lateral			l			

==== Finals ====
Danau final consonants are /t k ʔ m n ŋ x j/.

=== Vowels ===
Danau has a rich vowel inventory, including monophthongs and diphthongs: i ɪ, ɯ, u, ʊ, e, ɛ, ə, ɔ, o, a, ɐ, ɒ, ai, au, ou, ei, ɛe, eə. Some vowels occur only in closed syllables, /ə/ and /n̩/ are found only in the first (weak) syllable of sesquisyllabic words.

Danau monophthongs
	Front	Central	Back
Close	i ɪ	ɨ	ɯ u
Mid	e	ə	o
Open-mid	ɛ		ɔ
Open	æ	ɐ	

Danau diphthongs
	Front	Central	Back
Close	eɪ		uɪ
Near-close	ɪe		ou
Mid	ɛə	eɯ	
Open-mid	ɐɛ (ɐj)		ɐo
Open	æɛ		ɔɐ

Danau nasalized
	Front	Central	Back
Close	eɪ̃		oũ
Near-close	ɐɪ̃		ɐũ
Mid	æɛ̃		
Open-mid	æ̃		ɔ̃
Open			

=== Suprasegmentals (tone, register) ===
Danau is a tonal language with four tones according to some sources, while others, including native speakers, identify three tones. The three tones of Htanaw are realized as low/low-falling, mid/mid-falling, and high/high-rising. Tones in Danaw not only play a role in the lexicon, but also have grammatical functions. Tone sandhi changes low or mid tone words to high tone when preceded by a high tone, though not all words are affected by them. Tone sandhi works not only within words and phrases, but in some cases also across phrase and clause boundaries. The details of the sandhi rules, including the nature of lexemes affected, remain to be investigated. Nothing is known at the present regarding the origin and development of tones in Danau, apart from the fact that they are not inherited from proto-Palaungic. There is no obvious connection between tones and segmental changes in the language (devoicing, loss of finals) as has been described widely in other languages of Southeast and East Asia.
