= Quảng Lâm, Điện Biên =

Quảng Lâm
- Commune and village
- Country: Vietnam
- Province: Điện Biên

Area
  - Total: 233.25 km^{2} (90.06 sq mi)

Population (2025)
  - Total: 10,021
  - Density: 42.962/km^{2} (111.27/sq mi)
- Time zone: UTC+07:00 (Indochina Time)

Quảng Lâm is a commune (xã) and village of the Điện Biên Province, northwestern Vietnam.

The Quảng Lâm language, an Austroasiatic language, is spoken in the commune.

The entire natural area and population of Na Cô Sa Commune and Quảng Lâm Commune are rearranged to form a new commune named Quảng Lâm Commune.
