= Palaungic languages =

Subgroup of the Austroasiatic language family

Palaungic
- Geographic distribution: Mainland Southeast Asia
- Linguistic classification: Austroasiatic: Khasi–Palaungic; Palaungic
- Proto-language: Proto-Palaungic

Language codes
- Glottolog: east2331 (East Palaungic) west2791 (West Palaungic)
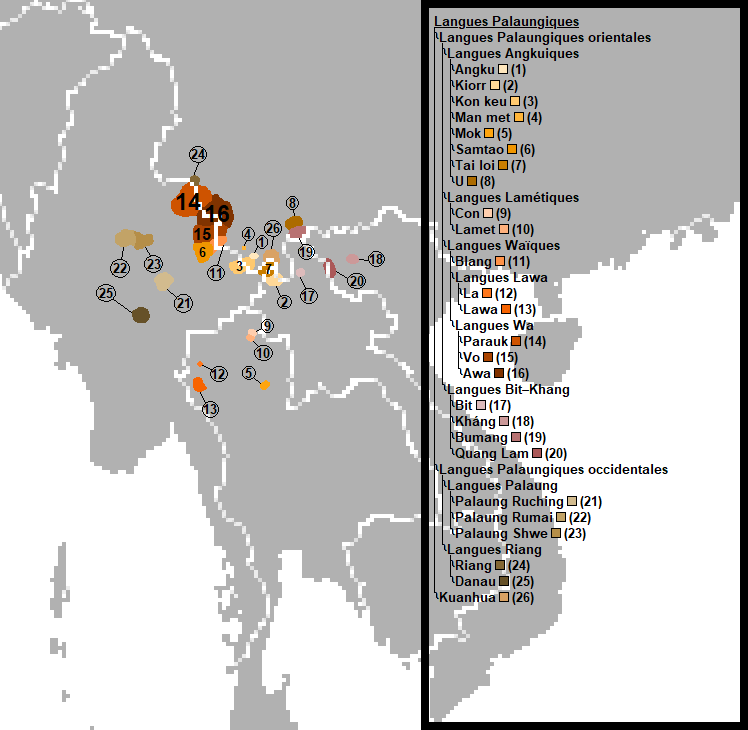
- Map (in French) of Palaungic languages

The Palaungic or Palaung–Wa languages are a group of nearly 30 Austroasiatic languages, with scholars disagreeing on exactly which languages to include in the classification. They are spoken in scattered pockets across an inland region of Southeast Asia, centered on the borders between Myanmar, Thailand, Laos, Vietnam, and China.

== Phonological developments ==
Most of the Palaungic languages lost the contrastive voicing of the ancestral Austroasiatic consonants, with the distinction often shifting to the following vowel. In the Wa branch, this is generally realized as breathy voice vowel phonation; in Palaung–Riang, as a two-way register tone system. The Angkuic languages have contour tone — the U language, for example, has four tones, high, low, rising, falling, — but these developed from vowel length and the nature of final consonants, not from the voicing of initial consonants.

== Homeland ==
Paul Sidwell (2015) suggests that the Palaungic Urheimat (homeland) was in what is now the border region of Laos and Sipsongpanna in Yunnan, China. The Khmuic homeland was adjacent to the Palaungic homeland, resulting in many lexical borrowings among the two branches due to intense contact. Sidwell (2014) suggests that the word for 'water' (Proto-Palaungic *ʔoːm), which Gérard Diffloth had used as one of the defining lexical innovations for his Northern Mon-Khmer branch, was likely borrowed from Palaungic into Khmuic.

== Classification ==
=== Diffloth & Zide (1992) ===
The Palaungic family includes at least three branches, with the position of some languages as yet unclear. Lamet, for example, is sometimes classified as a separate branch. The following classification follows that of Diffloth & Zide (1992), as quoted in Sidwell (2009:131).

- Western Palaungic (Palaung–Riang)
  - Palaung
    - Shwe (Gold Palaung, De'ang)
    - De'ang
    - Pale (Silver Palaung, Ruching)
    - Rumai
  - Riang
    - Riang proper, Yinchia
    - ? Danau (perhaps in Palaung–Riang)
- Eastern Palaungic
  - Angkuic
    - Angku
    - Hu
    - Kiorr
    - Kon Keu
    - Man Met
    - Mok
    - Samtao (Samtau)
    - Tai Loi
    - U (Pouma)
  - Lametic
    - Lamet (Xmet)
    - Con
  - Waic
    - Blang
    - Lawa
      - La
      - Lawa
    - Wa
      - Paraok (Standard Wa)
      - Khalo
      - Awa

Some researchers include the Mangic languages as well, instead of grouping them with the Pakanic languages.

=== Sidwell (2010) ===
The following classification follows the branching given by Sidwell (2010, ms).

- Danau (Khano)
- Palaungic proper
  - Western (Riang–Palaung)
    - Palaung (De'ang: Shwe / Gold Palaung, Pale / Ruching / Silver Palaung, Rumai)
    - Riang (Riang, Yinchia)
  - Angkuic
    - Hu
    - U (P'uman)
    - Kiorr (Kha Kior, Con)
    - Kon Keu (Angku)
    - Mok (Man Met)
    - Mong Lue (Tai Loi)
    - Muak Sa-aak
  - Lamet (Xmet)
  - Waic
    - Blang (Samtao)
    - Lawa
      - Umpai Lawa
      - Bo Luang Lawa
    - Wa
      - Paraok (Standard Wa)
      - Khalo
      - Awa
      - Meung Yum
      - Savaiq

Sidwell (2014) proposes an additional branch, consisting of:

- Bit–Khang
  - Bit
  - Kháng
  - Bumang
  - Quang Lam

=== Sidwell (2015) ===
Sidwell (2015:12) provides a revised classification of Palaungic. Bit–Khang is clearly Palaungic, but contains many Khmuic loanwords. Sidwell (2015:12) believes it likely groups within East Palaungic. On the other hand, Sidwell (2015) considers Danaw to be the most divergent Palaungic language.

- Danaw
- West Palaungic
  - Palaung (Dara’ang, Da’ang, Palay, etc.)
  - Rumai
  - Riang (Riang-Lang, Riang-Sak, etc.)
- East Palaungic
  - Waic
    - Wa (Praok, Awa, Vo, etc.)
    - Lawa (Lawa Bo Luang, Lavua/Luwa, etc.)
    - Bulang (Bulang, Plang/Samtao, Kawa, Kontoi, etc.)
  - Angkuic: U, Hu, Man Met/Kemie, Muak/Mok, Tai Loi, etc.
  - Lameet: Lameet, Con, Lua/Khamet
  - ? Bit–Khang: (Kha)bit, Buxing, Quang Lam, Khang/Khao, Bumang

== Lexical innovations ==
Diagnostic Palaungic lexical innovations as identified by Paul Sidwell (2021) are:

Gloss	Proto-Palaungic	Proto-Austroasiatic
‘eye’	*ˀŋaːj	*mat
‘fire’	*ŋal	*ʔɔːs~*ʔuːs
‘laugh’	*kəɲaːs	
