= Nansan, Yunnan =

Town in Yunnan, China

Nansan 南伞镇
- Town
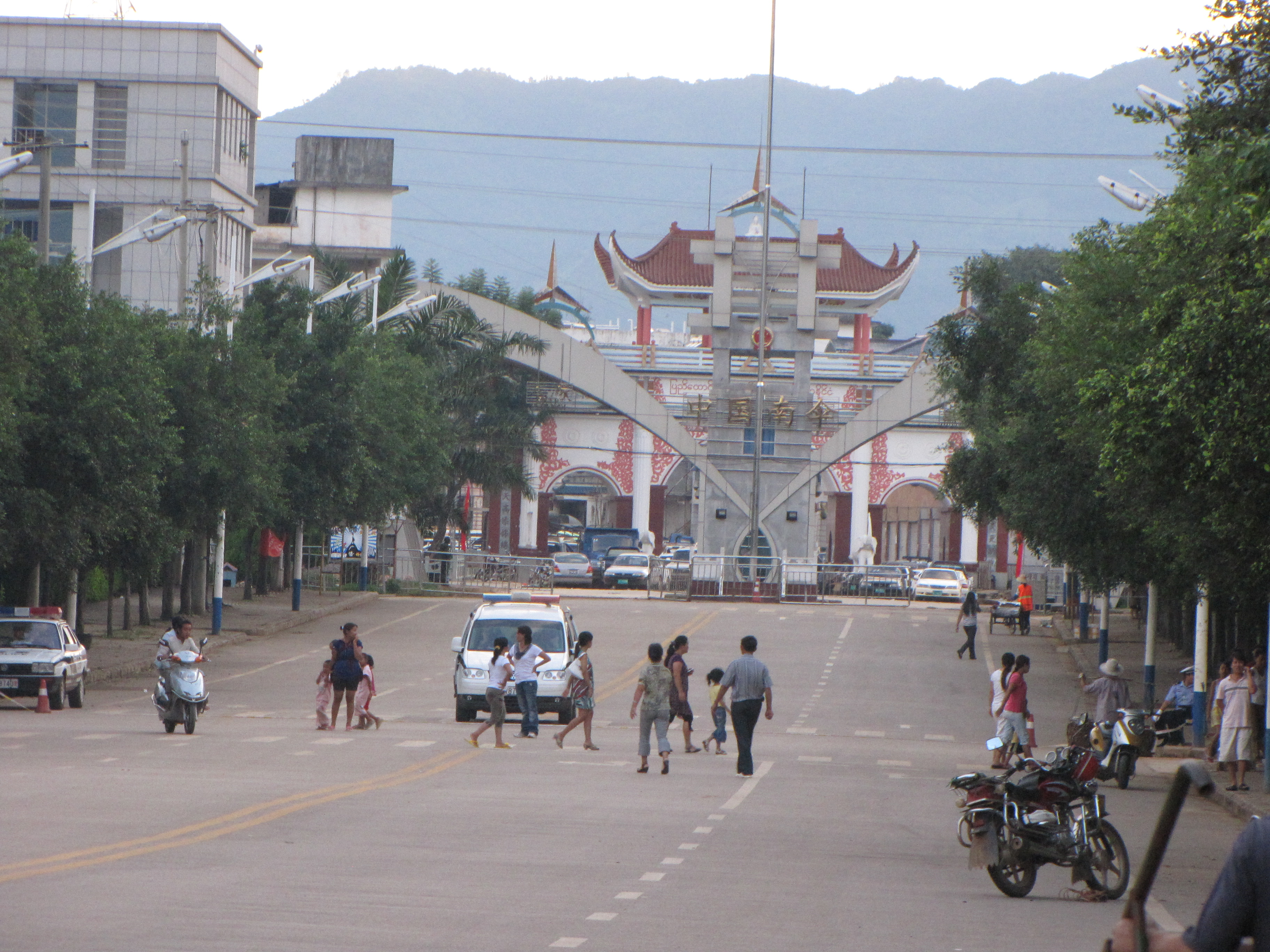
- Border Gate

- Location in Yunnan
- Coordinates: 23.7784°N 98.8253°E
- Country: People's Republic of China
- Province: Yunnan
- Prefecture-level city: Lincang
- County: Zhenkang
- Time zone: UTC+8 (China Standard)

Nansan Town (Chinese: 南伞镇; pinyin: Nánsǎn Zhèn) is a town under the jurisdiction of Zhenkang County, Lincang Prefecture, Yunnan Province, China.
