= Palaung language =

Mon–Khmer dialect cluster spoken in Southeast Asia

Palaung
- De'ang, Ta'ang
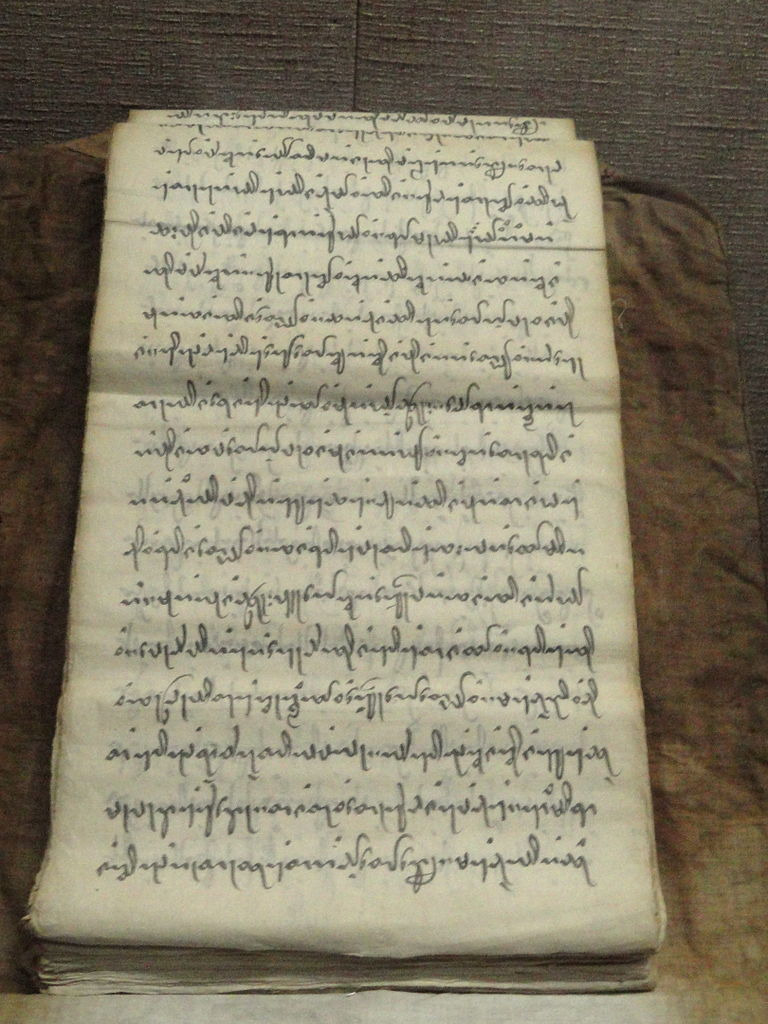
- De'ang manuscript
- Native to: Myanmar, China, Thailand
- Ethnicity: Ta'ang
- Native speakers: (ca. 560,000 cited 1982–??)
- Language family: Austroasiatic: Khasi–Palaungic; Palaungic; Palaung–Riang; Palaung
- Writing system: Burmese, Tai Le

Language codes
- ISO 639-3: Variously: pll – Shwe pce – Ruching rbb – Rumai
- Glottolog: pala1336

Palaung or Ta'ang (Burmese: ပလောင်ဘာသာ), also known as De'ang (Chinese: 德昂語; Burmese: တအာင်းဘာသာ), is an Austroasiatic dialect cluster spoken by over half a million people in Burma (Shan State) and neighboring countries. The Palaung people are divided into Palé (Ruching), Rumai, and Shwe, and each of whom have their own language. The Riang languages are reported to be unintelligible or only understood with great difficulty by native speakers of the other Palaung languages.

A total number of speakers is uncertain; there were 150,000 Shwe speakers in 1982, 272,000 Ruching (Palé) speakers in 2000, and 139,000 Rumai speakers at an unrecorded date. Palaung was classified as a "severely endangered" language in UNESCO's Atlas of the World's Languages in Danger. The Rulai dialect spoken near Lashio has regular phonological changes and some lexical differences from Ruching.

== Dialects ==
=== Yan and Zhou (2012) ===
Chinese linguists classify "De'ang 德昂" varieties (spoken mostly in Santaishan Ethnic De'ang Township 三台山德昂族乡, Mangshi and Junnong Township 军弄乡, Zhenkang County) as follows (De'angyu Jianzhi). Names in IPA are from Yan & Zhou (2012:154–155)

- Bulei 布雷 [pule] (representative datapoint: Yunqian 允欠, Mangshi): spoken in Luxi
  - Bulei 布雷 [pule] dialect
  - Raojin 饶进 [raudʑĕŋ] dialect
- Liang 梁 [liaŋ] (representative datapoint: Xiaochanggou 硝厂沟): spoken in Longchuan and Ruili
- Rumai 汝买 [romai], roraumai) (representative datapoint: Yechaqing 叶茶箐): spoken in Zhenkang and Baoshan

The De'ang 德昂 variously refer themselves as naʔaŋ, [daʔaŋ], [toʔaŋ], and [laʔaŋ], depending on the dialect (Yan & Zhou 2012:154–155). Another De'ang autonym is ho (rau) khaoʔ, where rau means 'village'. The local Dai people refer to the De'ang as po˧loŋ˧.

Liu (2006) documents three Palaungic lects, namely:

- Guangka Village, Mengxiu Township, Ruili City (瑞丽市勐休乡广卡村); [ru˥ mai˦˩˨]; tonal
- Mengdan Village, Santaishan Township (三台山勐丹村); [ʔaŋ]; non-tonal
- Guanshuang Village, Mengman Township, Xishuangbanna (西双版纳州勐满乡关双村); [ar˧˩ vaʔ˩˧]; tonal

=== Ostapirat (2009) ===
Weera Ostapirat (2009:74) classifies the Palaung languages as follows. Defining sound changes are given in parentheses.

Palaung

- Ta-ang
- Rumai-Darang (*-ɔŋ > -ɛŋ; *-uŋ > -ɨŋ)
  - Rumai (*-r- > -j-)
  - Ra-ang-Darang (*b, *d, *ɟ, *g > p, t, c, k)
    - Ra-ang
    - Darang (*-on > -uan; *-r > -n)
      - Na-ang
      - Darang
      - Da-ang
      - Dara-ang

=== Shintani (2008) ===
Shintani (2008) recognizes two dialects of Palaung, namely Southern Palaung and Northern Palaung. Southern Palaung unvoiced stops correspond to Northern Palaung voiced stops, the latter which Shintani (2008) believes to be retentions from Proto-Palaungic. Southern Palaung dialects studied by Shintani (2008) are those of:

- Kengtung town
- Waanpao village (near Kengtung)
- Chengphong village (near Kengtung)
- Loikhong village (near Mängpeng)
- Mängküng
- Yassaw
- Kalaw

=== Deepadung et al. (2015) ===
Deepadung et al. (2015) classify the Palaung dialects as follows.

Palaung

- Ta-ang: Namhsan, Khun Hawt, Htan Hsan
- (core Palaung)
  - Pule: Pang Kham, Man Loi, Meng Dan, Chu Dong Gua
  - Dara-ang: Pan Paw, Noe Lae, Nyaung Gone, Pong Nuea (?), Xiang Cai Tang 香菜塘
  - Rumai: Nan Sang, Guang Ka, Mang Bang
  - ? Cha Ye Qing 茶叶箐

== Phonology ==
Chen, et al. (1986) lists the following consonants for Palaung:

		Labial	Dental/ Alveolar	Palatal	Velar	Glottal
Stop	voiceless	p	t	tɕ	k	ʔ
Stop	aspirated	pʰ	tʰ	tɕʰ	kʰ	
Stop	voiced	b	d	dʑ	ɡ	
Nasal	voiced	m	n	ɲ̟	ŋ	ˀn
Nasal	voiceless	m̥	n̥	ɲ̟̊	ŋ̊	
Fricative	voiceless	f	s	ɕ		h
Fricative	voiced	v				
Rhotic	voiced		r			
Rhotic	voiceless		r̥			
Approximant	voiced		l	j		
Approximant	voiceless		l̥			

A final /r/ can be heard as a voiceless sound [ɹ̥], and following a /u/ it is heard as [ɫ̥].

	Front	Back	
Close	i	ɯ	u
Near-close	ɪ	ʊ	
Mid	e	ɤ	o
Open-mid	ɛ	ɔ	
Open	ɑ		

/ɤ/ can be heard in rapid speech as a central vowel [ə], and is heard as [ɤ] elsewhere. /a/ can be heard as fronted [æ] before /k, ŋ/, and [ɛ] before /n, t/.

According to Shorto (1960), /ɤ/ does not occur alone in primary stressed syllable, but only in an unstressed syllable or as the second member of a diphthong. There are also a large number of diphthongs, including /eo/, /eɤ/, /aɤ/, /ɔɤ/, /oɤ/, /uɤ/, and /iɤ/.

Although Milne (1921) includes the vowels /ü, ö, ɪ/ in her transcriptions, Shorto (1960) did not find these as vowel phonemes in his work.

(Note that the words cited below in the Syntax section come from Milne (1921), so their phonetic representations may need revision.)

== Writing system ==
During British rule in Burma, Palaung speakers used the Shan script to write their languages. An American Christian missionary introduced a new script for Palaung in 1912, but the script failed to gain traction.

In 1955, Paw San devised a new script for the language, and was awarded a gold medal by the local chieftain, Khun Pan Cing, for his efforts. However, the script did not displace other writing systems used for Palaung, especially due to the dominance of Shan authorities. From 1967 to 1968, the Shan Council held a session in Taunggyi to devise a new script and settled on a Burmese-based script to make Pali texts more accessible to Palaung speakers.

A standardised form of this script was adopted in 1972, and is currently used in non-formal education in Shan State and Mandalay. Based on the Burmese alphabet, it retains all Burmese consonants and introduces some new vowel combinations, an additional consonant (ႎ /v/), and a complete set of tone markers influenced by the Shan language. This enables Pali words to be written using their original form, though only Palaung-specific sounds are commonly represented. Unlike scripts for Mon or Burmese, the Palaung script does not reflect an older stage of the language. It shares some features with the Shan script. The script is especially used for the northern Palaung varieties of Shwe and Rumai, although the literacy rate is generally low due to the presence of higher prestige languages of Shan and Burmese in the region. Recently, community groups in Shan State and Mandalay have undertaken efforts to standardise Palaung orthography.

The southern variety of Palaung, Ruching, is also written using the Tai Tham script, although literacy is low, and now competes with the Burmese-derived script.

=== Letters ===
Shwe and Rumai Palaung consonants
က IPA: /k/	ခ IPA: /kʰ/	ꩾ IPA: /cʰ/ *	ဂ IPA: /g/	င IPA: /ŋ/
စ IPA: /c/	ဆ IPA: /s/	ꩿ IPA: /ʃ/ *	ဇ IPA: /z/	ည IPA: /ɲ/
တ IPA: /t/	ထ IPA: /tʰ/		ဒ IPA: /d/	န IPA: /n/
ပ IPA: /p/	ဖ IPA: /pʰ/		ဗ IPA: /b/	မ IPA: /m/
ယ IPA: /j/	ရ IPA: /ɹ/	လ IPA: /l/	ဝ IPA: /w/	ႎ IPA: /v/, /f/
သ IPA: /s/	ဟ IPA: /h/	အ IPA: /ʔ/		

^{*} Unique to Shwe Palaung.

== Grammar ==
A brief verbal morphology of Rumai, a variety of Palaung, was documented by Weymuth (2018). Verbs in Rumai Palaung are inflected per tense, aspect and mood.

Verbal affixes in Rumai Palaung
Affixes	Function	Domain
giːj-	imperfective	aspectual
ʔɯN-	durative	aspectual
ʔə-	inceptive	aspectual
hɔ̆j-	new situation	aspectual
tʌm-	experiential	aspectual
nʌŋ-	irrealis	modality
siŋ-	desiderative	modality
buː-	negative	negation
ʔaːw-	negative	negation
-maʔ	negative	negation
ɲjʌm-	‘not yet’	negation
kʰuː-	prohibitive	negation
kə-	reciprocal	reciprocal
laj-	reciprocal	reciprocal

nʌŋ-giːj-bâːj lôj hɲjɛ̂n hnaːŋ ʔɜ̂ː gʌ̀ː jʌ̂ːm
IRR-IPFV-happen only DEM how.many 1PL.INCL old die
"It only will be like this, until we are old, and we die."

=== Syntax ===
The examples below are form Milne (1921).

==== Nouns and noun phrases ====
The order of elements in the noun phrase is N – (possessor) – (demonstrative).

Consider the following examples:

kwɔɔn ai öö
child 1DU this
"this child of ours"

==== Prepositions and prepositional phrases ====
Shwe Palaung has prepositions, as in the following example.

ta khuun hɔɔkhəm
to great king
"to the great king"

==== Word order ====
Shwe Palaung clauses generally have subject–verb–object (SVO) word order.

əən dii d͡ʒüür gaaŋ
he future buy house
"He will buy a house"

== Sample text ==
The following part of a story in Shwe Palaung is from Milne (1921:146–147).

naːŋ̩ ɾaʃøːh naːŋ ʤy gɾaɪ ta kʰuːn hɔː.kʰəm naːŋ daːh
lady awake lady narrative-PAST said to great king lady say
"The queen awoke and said to the king"

øː ka tøːm ɾɪːn.puː ɬaɪ uː løːh kʰən.jaː øː ai lɔh ʃok.tiː haː øː
oh NEG ever dream even one time ruler oh we.two come fast place this
"'Oh, I never dreamed (like this) before, oh Ruler, (since) we two came to this place to fast"

pʰa.diː.u nɔ la puːɾ ʃə.ŋiː ɔː ɾɪːn.puː kʰuːn pʰiː leːh
today full good seven day I dream great spirit come.down
"Seven days ago, I dreamed that the great spirit came down"

dɛh ɔː hɔːm mak.mon kəːm ŋaːm nʲoː nʲoː
give me eat long.mango gold sweet very
"and gave me long mangoes of gold to eat. They were very sweet.'"
