= Riang language =

Austroasiatic language

Riang
- Native to: Burma, China
- Ethnicity: Palaung
- Native speakers: (28,000 cited 1995–2008)
- Language family: Austroasiatic: Khasi–Palaungic; Palaungic; Palaung–Riang; Riang

Language codes
- ISO 639-3: Either: ril – Riang Lang yin – Riang Lai
- Glottolog: rian1260
- ELP: Riang (Myanmar)
- Riang is classified as Critically Endangered by the UNESCO Atlas of the World's Languages in Danger

Riang is a Palaungic language of Burma and China. Speakers are culturally assimilated with the Karen, but are Palaung by ancestry and their language is unrelated. Riang Lang (Yinnet) and Riang Lai (Yinchia) are sometimes considered distinct languages.

== Phonology ==
Riang Lang (Yinnet) dialect's consonants described by Hall (2018):

		Labial	Dental/ Alveolar	Palatal	Velar	Uvular	Glottal
Stop	voiceless	p	t	c	k	(q)	ʔ
Stop	aspirated	pʰ	tʰ	cʰ	kʰ	(qʰ)	
Stop	voiced	b	d				
Nasal		m	n	ɲ	ŋ		
Fricative			s			(χ)	h
Lateral			l				
Rhotic			r				
Approximant		w		j			

- [q, qʰ] are allophones of initials /k kʰ/ when co-occur with /a, aː, ɔ/. Eg. [qáʔ] "fish", [qʰrɔ́] "rust".
- [χ] is the realization of /k/ in final position.

Riang Lang vowels (Hall 2018):

	Front	Central	Back
Close	i	ɨ	u
Close-mid	e	ə	o
Open		aː	
Open-mid	ɛ	a	ɔ
Diphthongs	[ia]		[ua]

Riang Lang is sesquisyllabic and has two tones. Its typical word template is ((C)ə̆(C)).(C)(C)V(C)t.
