= Zhenkang County =

Zhenkang County 镇康县
- County
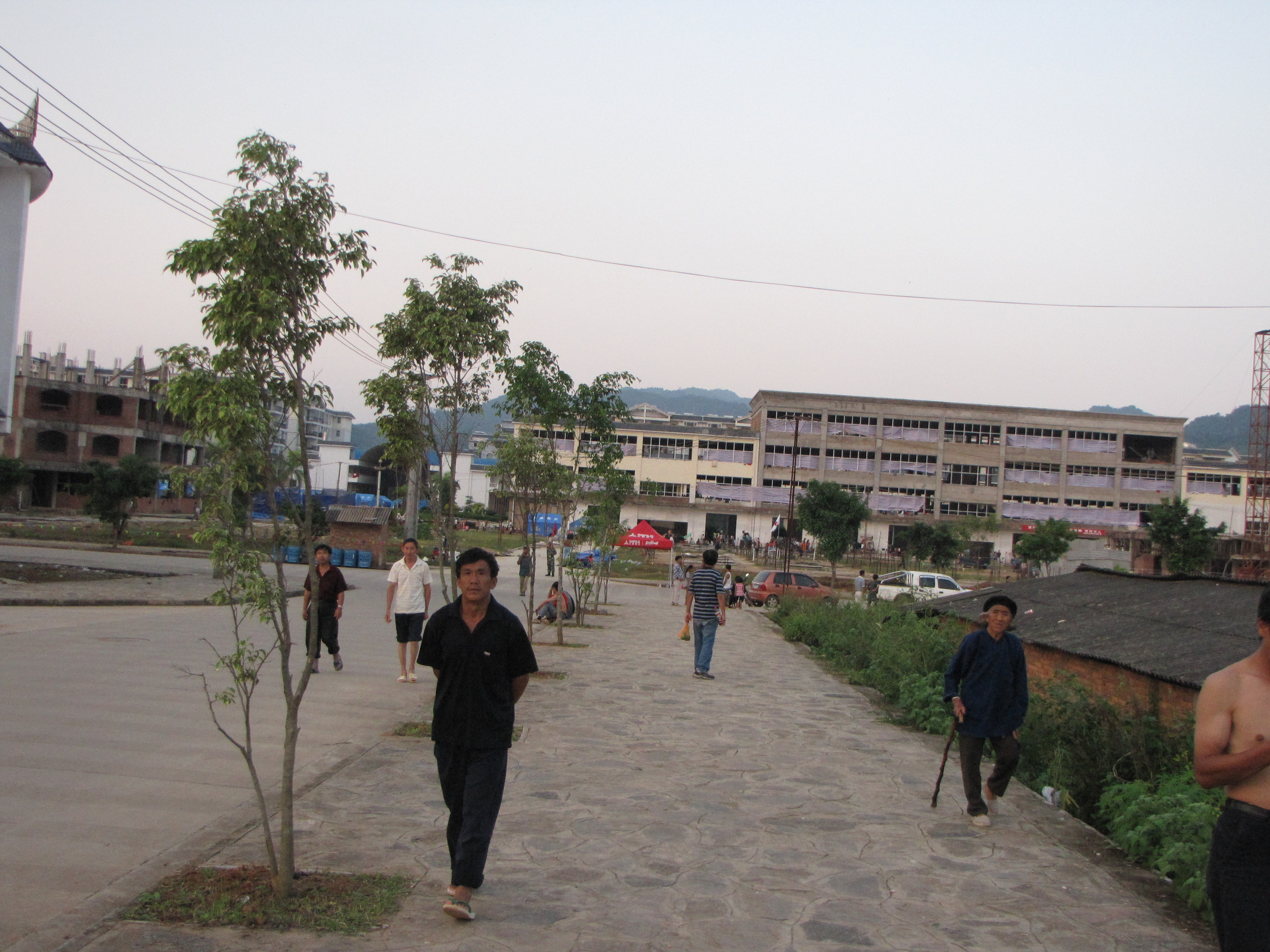
- Refugees from Myanmar at Nansan Town, Zhenkang County

- Location of Zhenkang County (red) and Lincang City (pink) within Yunnan
- Coordinates: 23°45′45″N 98°49′31″E
- Country: People's Republic of China
- Province: Yunnan
- Prefecture: Lincang City

Area
  - Total: 2,642 km^{2} (1,020 sq mi)

Population (2020)
  - Total: 172,879
- Time zone: UTC+8 (CST)
- Postal code: 677700
- Area code: 0883
- Website: www.ynzk.gov.cn

Zhenkang County (simplified Chinese: 镇康县; traditional Chinese: 鎮康縣; pinyin: Zhènkāng Xiàn) is located in western Yunnan province, China, bordering Burma's Shan State to the west. It is under the administration of the prefecture-level city of Lincang.

== Ethnic groups ==
Ethnic Bulang are found in the following villages in Zhenkang County (Zhenkang Ethnic Gazetteer 1994).

- Muchang District 木场区: Dalong 打龙, Mangxi 忙喜, Laohuangtian 老黄田, Jiuzhai 旧寨, Wengkong 翁控 in Dengteng 等藤
- Fengwei Town 凤尾镇: Xuancai Village 轩菜村

== Administrative divisions ==
The county government is located in Nansan Town.

Zhenkang County has 3 towns, 3 townships and 1 ethnic township.

3 towns

- Fengwei (凤尾镇)
- Mengpeng (勐捧镇)
- Nansan (南伞镇)

3 townships

- Mangbing (忙丙乡)
- Mengdui (勐堆乡)
- Muchang (木场乡)

1 ethnic township

- Junsai Wa Lahu Lisu and De'ang (军赛佤族拉祜族傈僳族德昂族乡)

== Climate ==
Climate data for Zhenkang, elevation 1,054 m (3,458 ft), (1991–2020 normals, extremes 1981–present)
Month	Jan	Feb	Mar	Apr	May	Jun	Jul	Aug	Sep	Oct	Nov	Dec	Year
Record high °C (°F)	29.2 (84.6)	31.5 (88.7)	32.7 (90.9)	35.3 (95.5)	36.1 (97.0)	35.8 (96.4)	33.8 (92.8)	33.5 (92.3)	33.1 (91.6)	32.0 (89.6)	30.8 (87.4)	27.4 (81.3)	36.1 (97.0)
Mean daily maximum °C (°F)	22.9 (73.2)	25.2 (77.4)	28.3 (82.9)	29.8 (85.6)	29.6 (85.3)	28.7 (83.7)	27.7 (81.9)	28.9 (84.0)	28.9 (84.0)	27.5 (81.5)	25.3 (77.5)	23.0 (73.4)	27.2 (80.9)
Daily mean °C (°F)	12.5 (54.5)	14.6 (58.3)	18.1 (64.6)	20.9 (69.6)	22.7 (72.9)	23.6 (74.5)	23.4 (74.1)	23.7 (74.7)	22.9 (73.2)	20.8 (69.4)	16.8 (62.2)	13.4 (56.1)	19.5 (67.0)
Mean daily minimum °C (°F)	6.1 (43.0)	7.0 (44.6)	10.2 (50.4)	14.1 (57.4)	18.0 (64.4)	20.8 (69.4)	21.1 (70.0)	20.9 (69.6)	19.9 (67.8)	17.4 (63.3)	12.4 (54.3)	8.2 (46.8)	14.7 (58.4)
Record low °C (°F)	−1.0 (30.2)	−0.9 (30.4)	1.6 (34.9)	5.4 (41.7)	11.2 (52.2)	15.9 (60.6)	15.6 (60.1)	17.0 (62.6)	11.9 (53.4)	8.6 (47.5)	5.4 (41.7)	−0.7 (30.7)	−1.0 (30.2)
Average precipitation mm (inches)	24.4 (0.96)	16.3 (0.64)	21.2 (0.83)	61.0 (2.40)	166.3 (6.55)	254.9 (10.04)	375.8 (14.80)	293.6 (11.56)	189.5 (7.46)	152.9 (6.02)	51.2 (2.02)	14.1 (0.56)	1,621.2 (63.84)
Average precipitation days (≥ 0.1 mm)	3.9	4.0	5.4	11.4	17.2	24.3	28.0	24.5	19.8	16.9	8.2	4.5	168.1
Average relative humidity (%)	78	70	63	66	76	85	88	87	86	86	84	83	79
Mean monthly sunshine hours	210.9	208.6	220.0	204.4	180.1	113.6	83.7	124.8	144.7	151.4	177.6	193.4	2,013.2
Percentage possible sunshine	63	65	59	53	44	28	20	31	40	43	54	59	47
Source: China Meteorological Administrationall-time November high
