= Lexical innovation =

Concept in linguistics

In linguistics, specifically the sub-field of lexical semantics, the concept of lexical innovation includes the use of neologism or new meanings (so-called semantic augmentation) in order to introduce new terms into a language's lexicon. Most commonly, this is found in technical disciplines where new concepts require names, which often takes the form of jargon. For example, in the subjects of sociology or philosophy, there is an increased technicalization in terminology in the English language for different concepts over time. Many novel terms or meanings in a language are created as a result of translation from a source language, in which certain concepts were first introduced (e.g. from Plato's Ancient Greek into Latin or from Kant's German into English).

== Lexical innovation via neologism ==
A straightforward method of introducing new terms in a language is to create a neologism, i.e. a completely new lexical item in the lexicon. For example, in the philosopher Heidegger's native German, he introduced neologisms to describe various concepts in his ontology (Dasein and Mitsein, for instance; both derived from common German words da and sein, etc.). Neologisms can be formed from native elements of a language (morphemic material, suffixes, affixes, etc.), or directly from loan-words. Often, new words are explicitly or indirectly signalled by an author, for instance apologizing for a neologism or unfamiliar term, or adding quotation marks. Neologisms are sometimes introduced via morphological calques, e.g. translating a word from a source language into the target language on a morpheme-for-morpheme basis. This produces lexically precise renditions of foreign terms in the native language.

=== Loanwords ===
Sometimes, technical terms are simply imported from another language to fill a lacuna in the target language's lexicon. For instance, in antiquity, the Romans felt no need to create a Latin equivalent of the Greek's philosophia and authors such as Cicero, although very much aware of style and proper Latin diction, seems at ease at using the term throughout his works. In his book, the Tusculan Disputations (1.1), Cicero refers to philosophia with the Latin phrase studio sapientiae 'the pursuit of knowledge' but reverts to using the more compact Greek term throughout his works. As another example in modern parlance, in the fields of political science and sociology, the well-known term apartheid originated as a loanword from Afrikaans apart + the suffix -heid in the late 1920s and became a label of the official government policy in South Africa from 1947 onwards. The official English synonym was 'separate development' (1955), however this never became productive among sociologists or political theorists, who instead simply adopted the loan-word in English. Vinay and Debelnet (1995, 31) describe borrowing as a means ‘to overcome a lacuna, usually a metalinguistic one (e.g. a new technical process, an unknown concept)’ and ‘is the simplest of all translation methods’.

== Semantic augmentation ==
The phrase semantic augmentation is a broad label that includes semantic extensions, metaphorical usages, and other kinds of linguistic devices to introduce new meanings to words. This often occurs due to language contact. So Ullmann noted on his discussion of polysemy: ‘“Semantic borrowing”, as it is usually called, will be particularly frequent where there is intimate contact between two languages one of which serves as a model to the other.' An example is the use of the familiar abstract noun alienation in English to refer to sociological analysis of labor rights in areas such as economics. The term had been a common legal term in English, derived from Latin alienatio and denoted the transfer of property, or more precisely, ownership of property, hence 'alienating' property from oneself to another. The term became an equivalent to Karl Marx's theory of alienation or Entfremdung, thus the English term came to take on a novel meaning, or rather, had its original meaning augmented to include this Marxist concept.

== Lexical innovation through translation: sociolinguistic factors ==
It is sometimes the case that a given author consciously avoids loan-words or the creation of neologisms (where a term is lacking in her language) and instead aims to rely more upon the existing resources of her native lexicon. This was the case in Ancient Rome, where Latin authors were often reticent to introduce foreign words from Greek (e.g. Caesar's De Analogia 1.10.4: ut tamquam scopulum, sic fugias inauditum atque insolens verbum 'and you ought to avoid a word that is strange and unfamiliar as if it were a rock'). Such attitudes, common among Roman elites, led to a preference in translation techniques against literalism or fidelity to the source (e.g. neologisms, morphological calques, etc.), and in favor of a more conceptual renovation using the existing terms of the Latin lexicon (semantic augmentation, derivation, etc.). This practice changed dramatically over time, as later Latin authors favored literal translation techniques when introducing new technical terms into the language, e.g. Boethius' technical translations of Aristotle's logical works in the early 6th century A.D.

In a similar vein, while many modern languages have directly imported technological terms such as 'computer' into their lexicon (e.g. Danish, Dutch, Italian), others have avoided the English term entirely and relied on neologisms based on native morphemic material of their language or existing terms (e.g. Chinese 电脑, which literally means 'electric brain'; or Icelandic tölva—a compound of tala 'number' and völva 'prophetess').

== Importance of lexical innovation in technical writing ==
Innovation in a given language, most particularly in the prose of specialized subjects, does not normally occur in a vacuum; that is, so-called nonce-formations and compounding predominantly arise in more literary modes, such as epic poetry or drama (tragic or comic, etc.) rather than technical prose. Instead, novel technical terms are introduced most commonly as a result of language contact, e.g. the influence of a source language on a target language (Ancient Greek on Latin, German on English, etc.). This novelty is not always formal, e.g. neologisms or loan-words, but conceptual too, augmenting the existing meaning of words in the target language so as to accommodate or include new concepts introduced exogenously into the target language's lexicon.

This phenomenon is an ancient one, proving to be decisive in the origins of Western Europe's philosophical and scientific vocabulary, for example. Many of the Ancient Greeks' original neologisms and novel meanings came to generate continual and permanent influence on Latin writers and, thence, on local languages across Europe in the Middle Ages and Renaissance.

== See also ==
- Linguistic purism
