= Lamet language =

Austroasiatic language spoken in Laos

Lamet
- Rmeet
- Khamet (Xmet)
- Native to: Laos
- Ethnicity: Lamet
- Native speakers: (20,000 cited 1995 census)
- Language family: Austroasiatic: Khasi–Palaungic; Palaungic; Lamet

Language codes
- ISO 639-3: lbn
- Glottolog: lame1256

Lamet is a Mon–Khmer language of Laos. There are also one hundred speakers in Lampang Province, Thailand, where it is known as Khamet. Lamet speakers call their language [χəmɛːt], or less commonly [kʰəmɛːt].

== Locations ==
Lamet of Lampang was originally spoken in Takluh village north of Namtha in Laos.

A closely related variety called Lua' is spoken in Ban Pang Chok (Ban Lua), Wiang Pa Pao District, southern Chiang Rai Province, Thailand.

== Phonology ==
Consonants
	Labial	Alveolar	Palatal	Velar	Glottal
Plosive	p	t	c	k	ʔ
Fricative	f	s		ɣ	h
Nasal	m	n		ŋ	
Approximant	w	r, l	j		

Vowels
	Front	Central	Back
High	i iː	ɯ ɯː	u uː
Near-high	ɪ ɪː	ə əː	ʊ ʊː
Mid	e eː	ʌ ʌː	o oː
Low	ɛ ɛː	a aː	ɑ ɑː

Lamet also has two tones; high and low.
