= Paul Sidwell =

Australian linguist

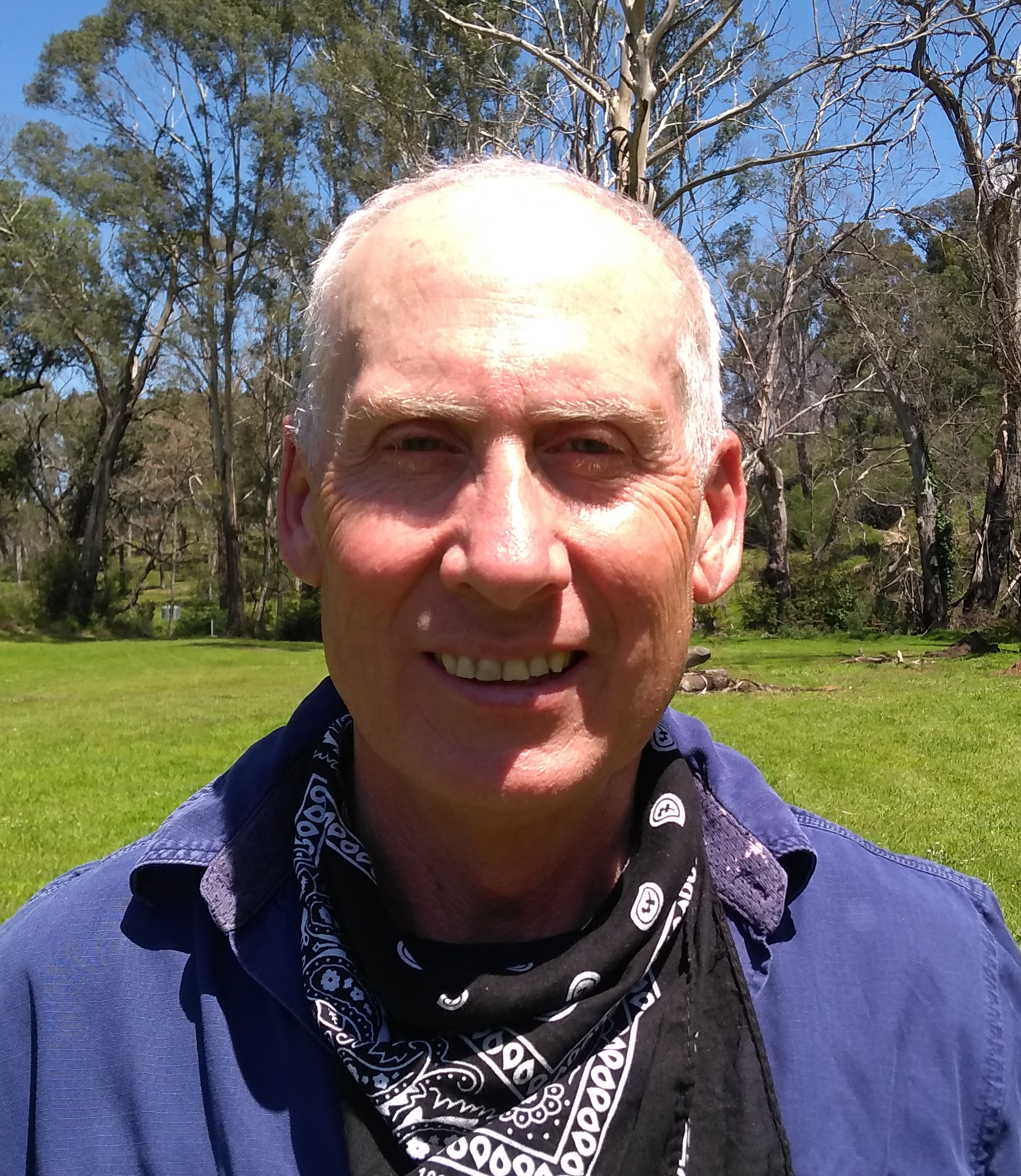
- Born: Paul James Sidwell
- Other name: Paul J. Sidwell
- Education: University of Melbourne (Ph.D.)
- Known for: Proto-Austroasiatic reconstruction
- Scientific career
- Fields: Historical linguistics, Austroasiatic languages
- Workplaces: Australian National University
- Thesis: A reconstruction of Proto-Bahnaric (1998)
- Website: Official website

Paul James Sidwell is an Australian linguist who has held research and lecturing positions at the Australian National University in Canberra. Sidwell, who is also an expert and consultant in forensic linguistics, is most notable for his work on the historical linguistics of the Austroasiatic language family, and has published reconstructions of the Austroasiatic, Bahnaric, Katuic, Palaungic, Khasic, and Nicobaric proto-languages. Sidwell is currently the president of the Southeast Asian Linguistics Society (SEALS) and also regularly organises the International Conference on Austroasiatic Linguistics (ICAAL).

== Career ==
In 2001, Sidwell was appointed as a collaborating scientist at the Max Planck Institute for Evolutionary Anthropology in Leipzig, Germany. From 2001 to 2004, he was an Australian Research Council Postdoctoral Research Fellow at the Australian National University, remaining there from 2005 to 2007 as a visiting research fellow, funded by the Max Planck Institute. From 2007 to 2011 he was director of the Mon-Khmer Language Project at the Center for Research in Computational Linguistics at Bangkok, and from 2012 to 2016 an Australian Research Council Future Fellow at the Australian National University, working on the Austroasiatic Lexicon Project. For the rest of 2016 he rejoined the Center for Research in Computational Linguistics, Bangkok, as a consulting linguist on the DARPA/LORELEI Project. Since 2017 he has been a partner at Language Intelligence, and in 2017/2018 was an honorary lecturer of the Australian National University. From 2019 to 2021 he was an honorary associate in the Department of Linguistics of the University of Sydney.

== Personal life ==
Sidwell currently lives in Batemans Bay, New South Wales.

== Publications ==
=== Books ===
- Sidwell, Paul; Jenny, Mathias, eds. (2021). The Languages and Linguistics of Mainland Southeast Asia (PDF). De Gruyter. doi:10.1515/9783110558142. ISBN 978-3-11-055814-2. S2CID 242359233.
- Jenny, Mathias and Paul Sidwell (eds). 2015. The handbook of Austroasiatic languages. Leiden, Boston: Brill.
- Sidwell, Paul. 2015. The Palaungic Languages: Classification, Reconstruction and Comparative Lexicon. Munich: Lincom Europa.
- Sidwell, Paul and Philip Jenner. 2010. Old Khmer Grammar. Canberra: Pacific Linguistics.
- Sidwell, Paul. 2009. Classifying the Austroasiatic Languages: history and state of the art. Munich: Lincom Europa.
- Sidwell, Paul. 2005. The Katuic Languages: classification, reconstruction and comparative lexicon. Munich: Lincom Europa.
- Sidwell, Paul and Pascale Jacq. 2003. A Handbook of Comparative Bahnaric: volume 1 — West Bahnaric. Canberra: Pacific Linguistics 551.
- Sidwell, Paul. 2000. Proto South Bahnaric: a reconstruction of a Mon-Khmer language of Indo-China. Canberra: Pacific Linguistics 501.
- Sidwell, Paul and Pascale Jacq. 2000. A Comparative West Bahnaric Dictionary. Munich: Lincom Europa.
- Sidwell, Paul and Pascale Jacq. 1999. Sapuan (Sepuar). Munich: Lincom Europa.
- Sidwell, Paul and Pascale Jacq. 1999. Loven (Jruq) Consolidated Lexicon. Munich: Lincom Europa.

=== Dissertation ===
- Sidwell, Paul. 1998. A reconstruction of Proto-Bahnaric. Ph.D. dissertation. University of Melbourne.
