= Khasi–Palaungic languages =

Austroasiatic language branch

Khasi–Palaungic
- Geographic distribution: Indo-Burman Ranges, Indochina
- Linguistic classification: Austroasiatic: Khasi–Palaungic
- Subdivisions: Khasic; Palaungic

Language codes
- Glottolog: khas1273

The Khasi–Palaungic languages are a primary branch of the Austroasiatic language family of Southeast Asia in the classification of Sidwell (2011, 2018). This is a departure from Diffloth (2005) classification of Khasi-Khmuic with Khmuic and Mangic (Pakanic) now being separate branches within Austroasiatic family.

== Languages ==
As per the classification of Sidwell (2011) and (2018), the Khasi–Palaungic languages are as follows:

- Khasi–Palaungic
  - Khasic: War, Lyngngam, Khasi, Pnar...
  - Palaungic: Palaung, Riang, Blang, Wa...

== Lexical innovations ==
Sidwell (2021) lists some following important Khasi-Palaungic isoglosses and other Northern Austroasiatic correspondences:

Gloss	Khasi	Proto-Palaungic	Danau	Khmu	Mang	Bolyu
'blood'	snaːm	*snaːm	kᵊnɑn⁴	maːm	ham¹	saːm⁵³
'rain'	slap	*clɛːʔ	kᵊlɪ¹	kmaʔ	ma²	qɔ⁵⁵
'two'	ʔaːr	*ləʔaːr	ʔɑn⁴	baːr	ʑɨəj⁴	mbi⁵⁵
'water'	ʔum	*ʔoːm	ʔun⁴	ʔom, ʔɔːk	ʑum¹	nde⁵³
'nail'	trsim	*rəmsiːm	(kᵊleəŋ⁴)	tmʰmɔːŋ	–	maːi¹³
'I'	(Pnar ʔɔ)	*ʔɔːʔ	oʔ¹	ʔoʔ	ʔuː⁴	ʔaːu⁵⁵
