= List of ethnic groups in Laos =

The following is a list of ethnic groups in Laos. According to the 2025 Population and Housing Census, the country enumerated 6,744,701 residents, of whom 6,664,874 held Lao citizenship. Among Lao citizens, the Lao were the largest named ethnic group (3,651,570; 54.8%), followed by the Hmong (743,525; 11.2%) and the Khmou (724,636; 10.9%).

The census figures below count people with Lao citizenship who were enumerated in 2025. They are not the post-enumeration-survey-adjusted estimate of the total resident population, and do not separately enumerate every ethnolinguistic subgroup mentioned in earlier studies.

== 2025 Population and Housing Census ==
The 2025 census tabulated 50 named ethnic groups among persons holding Lao citizenship, classified into four ethno-linguistic families. These are census ethnicity categories based on reported ethnic affiliation, which do not necessarily correspond one-to-one with language-based subgroup names. The 50 named groups total 6,627,132 persons; 266 were recorded as mixed ethnicity, 20,660 as other ethnicity, and 16,816 had ethnicity not stated.

Enumerated Lao-citizenship population by ethnic group, 2025
Ethno-linguistic family	Ethnic group (census spelling)	Population
Lao-Tai	Lao	3,651,570
Lao-Tai	Tai	137,717
Lao-Tai	Phouthay	175,594
Lao-Tai	Lue	124,503
Lao-Tai	Ngoaun	21,637
Lao-Tai	Yang	6,446
Lao-Tai	Xaek	2,893
Lao-Tai	Thaineua	8,866
Mon-Khmer	Khmou	724,636
Mon-Khmer	Pray	27,560
Mon-Khmer	Xingmoun	10,239
Mon-Khmer	Phong	31,990
Mon-Khmer	Thaen	531
Mon-Khmer	Oedou	80
Mon-Khmer	Bid	1,950
Mon-Khmer	Lamed	21,302
Mon-Khmer	Samtao	3,052
Mon-Khmer	Katang	108,894
Mon-Khmer	Makong	113,456
Mon-Khmer	Tri	46,445
Mon-Khmer	Yrou	40,478
Mon-Khmer	Trieng	43,939
Mon-Khmer	Ta-oy	45,623
Mon-Khmer	Yae	13,492
Mon-Khmer	Brao	26,723
Mon-Khmer	Katu	33,257
Mon-Khmer	Harak	27,565
Mon-Khmer	Oy	23,534
Mon-Khmer	Kriang	12,665
Mon-Khmer	Cheng	7,827
Mon-Khmer	Sadang	582
Mon-Khmer	Xuay	28,513
Mon-Khmer	Nhaheun	10,007
Mon-Khmer	Lavy	1,782
Mon-Khmer	Pacoh	27,571
Mon-Khmer	Khmer	5,732
Mon-Khmer	Toum	3,496
Mon-Khmer	Ngouan	748
Mon-Khmer	Moy	492
Mon-Khmer	Kree	1,316
Mon-Khmer	Bru	73,581
Hmong-Mien	Hmong	743,525
Hmong-Mien	Ewmien	30,553
Chinese-Tibetan	Akha	128,883
Chinese-Tibetan	Pounoy	36,192
Chinese-Tibetan	Lahou	21,680
Chinese-Tibetan	Syla	3,437
Chinese-Tibetan	Hayi	495
Chinese-Tibetan	Lolo	1,483
Chinese-Tibetan	Hor	12,600
Other / not stated	Mixed	266
Other / not stated	Other ethnic group	20,660
Other / not stated	Not stated	16,816
Total Lao citizens enumerated		6,664,874

The 2025 census reported 774,078 people in the Hmong-Mien family, comprising 743,525 Hmong and 30,553 Ewmien. The census did not publish separate totals for Hmong Daw and Hmong Njua under Table 2.05.

== Classification ==
Specialists are largely in agreement as to the ethnolinguistic classification of the ethnic groups of Laos. For the purposes of the 1995 census, the government of Laos recognized 149 ethnic groups within 47 main ethnicities. whereas the Lao Front for National Construction (LFNC) had revised the list to include 49 ethnicities consisting of over 160 ethnic groups, according to a 2006 document. The 2025 census published counts for 50 named ethnicity categories, plus mixed, other and not-stated categories.

The term ethnic minorities is used by some to classify the non-Lao ethnic groups, while the term indigenous peoples is not used by Lao authorities. These 160 ethnic groups speak a total of 73 distinct living languages as of 2025.

== Other ethnolinguistic classifications and subgroup estimates ==
The following classification-based lists include language communities, local subgroups and historical population estimates from different sources and years. Unless expressly marked as a 2025 census figure, their numbers are not official 2025 census totals. Some groups below fall within a broader ethnicity category in the 2025 census and should not be added to the national census totals as separate populations.

== Austronesian ==
- Cham (population of 250–700 in Laos; known as Laotian Cham)

== Mon-Khmer ==
- Aheu (population of approximately 1,770 in Bolikhamsai Province)
- Alak (population of approximately 4,000 in southern Laos)
- Arem (population of approximately 500 in Laos)
- Bo (population of 2,950 in Laos)
- Bru (73,581 in the 2025 census)
- Chut (population of 450 in Khammouane Province)
- Halang Doan (population of 2,350 in Attapeu Province and on the Kasseng Plateau)
- Hung or Tum (population of 2,000 in Bolikhamsai and Khammouane Provinces)
- Ir (population of 4,420 in Salavan Province)
- Jeh (population of 8,013 in southern Laos)
- Katang (108,894 in the 2025 census)
- Katu (33,257 in the 2025 census)
- Khlor (population of 6,000 in Laos)
- Khmer (5,732 in the 2025 census)
- Khua (population of 2,000 in Laos)
- Kri (the census category Kree recorded 1,316 in 2025)
- Kuy (population of 51,180 in Laos)
- Lavae (also referred to as Brao)
- Lave (population of 12,750 in Laos)
- Laven (population of 40,519 in Laos)
- Lavi
- Maleng (population of 800 in Laos)
- Mon (population of 4000-8000 in Laos)
- Ngae (population of 12,189 in Laos)
- Nguon
- Nyaheun (10,007 in the 2025 census)
- Ong
- Oi (the 2025 census category Oy recorded 23,534)
- Pakoh (the 2025 census category Pacoh recorded 27,571)
- Phong (31,990 recorded under Phong in the 2025 census)
- Sadang (582 recorded under Sadang in the 2025 census)
- Salang (ethnic group)
- Sapuan (ethnic group)
- Makong (113,456 in the 2025 census)
- Sou
- Souei
- Taliang
- Ta-oi (45,623 in the 2025 census)
- Vietnamese (population of 76,000 in Laos)
- Yae (13,492 in the 2025 census)

== Palaungic ==
- Bit (population of 1,530 in Laos, disputed as to whether Palaungic or Khmuic)
- Con (population of 1,000 in Luang Namtha Province)
- Samtao (3,052 in the 2025 census)
- Lamet (the 2025 census category Lamed recorded 21,302)

== Khmuic ==
- Khmu (724,636 in the 2025 census, recorded as Khmou)
- Khuen (population of approximately 8,000 in Laos)
- Mal (population of 23,200 in Laos)
- Mlabri (population of 24 in Laos, also known as the Yumbri)
- O'du (the 2025 census category Oedou recorded 80)
- Phai (population of 15,000 in Laos)
- Xinh Mul (10,239 recorded as Xingmoun in the 2025 census)

== Tibeto-Burman ==
- Lolo ethnicity
  - Akha (128,883 in the 2025 census; also called Kaw)
  - Hani (population of 1,122 in Phongsaly Province)
  - Kaduo (population of 5,000 on Laos-China border)
  - Lahu (21,680 under the Lahou category in the 2025 census)
  - Lahu Shi (population of 3,240 in Laos)
  - Phana
  - Phunoi (36,192 recorded as Pounoy in the 2025 census)
  - Si La (3,437 recorded as Syla in the 2025 census)
- Kado (population of 225 in Phongsaly Province)

== Hmong-Mien ==
- Hmong (743,525 in the 2025 census, without a separate census breakdown for Hmong Daw and Hmong Njua)
  - Hmong Daw
  - Hmong Njua
- Ewmien (30,553 in the 2025 census, reported under the ethnicity Ewmien)
- Kim Mun (a linguistic subgroup not separately counted in the 2025 census table)

== Tai and Rau ==
- Tai Daeng
- Tai Dam
- Tai Gapong
- Tai He (or Tai E)
- Tai Khang (population of 47,636 in Laos)
- Tay Khang
- Tai Kao
- Kongsat
- Kuan (population of 2,500 in Laos)
- Tai Laan
- Tai Maen
- Lao (3,651,570 in the 2025 census)
- Lao Lom
- Tai Long
- Tai Lue (124,503 recorded as Lue in the 2025 census)
- Northeastern Thai (including the Tai Kaleun and Isan people)
- Tai Nuea
- Kassak (located to the south and southeast of Luang Prabang, in an area bounded by the Nam Khan River, Phu Hin Salik, Nam Sanane River, Nam Ming River, and Nam Khan River up to Xieng Ngeun District). The Kassak language is a Lao dialect, although the Kassak people live a lifestyle similar to that of the Khmu people.
- Nùng
- Nyaw
- Tai Pao
- Tai Peung
- Phuan (population of 106,099 in Laos)
- Phutai (175,594 recorded as Phouthay in the 2025 census)
- Saek (2,893 recorded as Xaek in the 2025 census)
- Tai Sam
- Tai Yo
- Tayten
- Yoy
- Zhuang (including the Nùng people)
- Shan
- Yang (6,446 in the 2025 census)

== Chinese ==
- Chinese
- Laotian Chinese

== Unclassified ==
- Chere
- Jri

Below are some groups of Laos who speak unclassified languages, listed roughly from north to south. The populations in this historical table are estimates from older sources, not 2025 census counts. District codes are also given (see districts of Laos).

Unclassified languages of Laos
Ethnolinguistic group	Population	Possible linguistic affiliation	Locations
Poumong	1,000	Tibeto-Burman (Phunyot)	Ban Phoumon. Boun-Tai (2-07) and Khoa (2-03) districts, southern Phongsaly Province
Pouhoy	200 (1995; 35 families)	Oy, Katuic?	Kang Village, Namo District (4-03), northern Oudomxai Province
Taket	< 1,000	Austro-Asiatic?	Nambak District (6-05), Luang Prabang Province
Tamoy	500 (< 15 villages)	Palaungic, Khmuic?	Viangphoukha District (3-04), Luang Namtha Province
Nguan	30,000	Lametic, Palaungic?	Nale (3-05), Viangphoukha (3-04), and Luang Namtha (3-01) districts of Luang Namtha Province, near the Khuen, Lamet, and Khmu Rok peoples; also in Houayxay District (5-01), Bokeo Province
Salao	800	Ethnic Lao	Pakxong District (16-04), Champasak Province

== See also ==
- Demographics of Laos
