= Khmuic peoples =

Khmuic/Kơbru
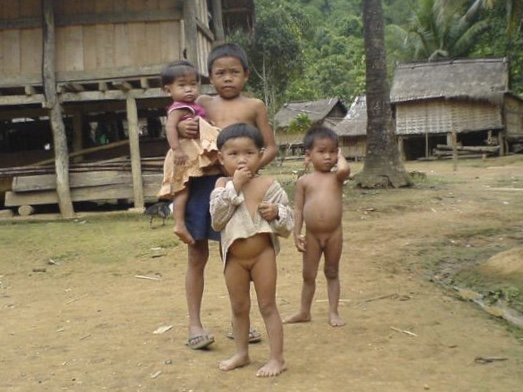
- Khmu children in Laos

Total population
- 643,000 (excluding disputed Khao and Bit peoples)

Regions with significant populations
- Laos, Vietnam, Thailand, Burma and China

Languages
- Khmuic languages

Religion
- Theravada Buddhism, Animism, Shamanism, Native Ancestral Worship

Related ethnic groups
- Palaungic peoples, Mon–Khmer peoples and Munda peoples

Khmuic peoples refers to a group of ethnic groups of Southeast Asia who speak the Khmuic group of Austroasiatic languages.

== Geographic distribution ==
The Khmuic peoples are aboriginal to Laos and surrounding areas. Most Khmuic peoples live in northern Laos and neighboring areas in Vietnam, although they can also be found in Thailand, Burma and China.

== Individual Khmuic speaking groups ==
The individual Khmuic ethnic groups are as follows:

- Khmu
- Khmu U
- Khmu Rok
- Khmu Kwean
- Khmu Cheuang
- Khmu Leu
- Khmu Yuan
- Khmu Khrong
- Khmu Kasak
- Khmu Mea
- Khmu Montagnards

Other two groups: Khmu Chuang and Khmu Kaye are extinct or were assimilated in other ethnic groups especially Khmu Chuang was believed to be extinct, absorbed or assimilated by or into Khmer. In the ancient time, the Khmu Chuang lived in the southern part of Khmuic territory which is the area of the present day southern Laos). The Khmu Kaye lived in the eastern part of Khmuic territory which is the area of the present day Xiengkhuang province. Be in mind that some scholars confuse Khmu Cheuang [cɯaŋ] and Khmu Chuang [cuaŋ]. These two groups are not the same, Khmu Cheuang are still exist in the present day and mostly live in northwestern of Vietnam.

== Non-Khmu peoples ==
The following are individual ethnic groups which some scholars misunderstand that they are Khmu and speak Khmuic. In fact they are much different from Khmu, in both language and culture. There are only a few words (less than 10%) of their vocabularies that resemble Khmuic.

- Lua
- Mal (also known as the Tin in Thailand and the Thin in Laos)
- Mlabri (also known as the Yumbri)
- O Du
- Phai
- Pray
- Xinh Mul
- Phong
- Phong-Kniang
- Khang

There are also the Khao and Bit peoples which were once thought to be Khmuic, although recent linguistic studies suggest they are probably Palaungic.

== Origin ==
The Khmuic peoples are believed to have migrated by land from China to Laos, where they have resided for at least 4,000 years. Some 10,000 years ago, they were probably part of a largely homogeneous ethnicity, now referred to as the Austro-Asiatic peoples, with a homeland somewhere within the borders of the modern-day People's Republic of China. The prevalence of Y-DNA Haplogroup O among Austro-Asiatic peoples suggests a common ancestry with the Sino-Tibetan, Austronesian, and Hmong–Mien peoples some 35,000 years ago in China. Haplogroup O is a subclade of Y-DNA Haplogroup K, which is believed to have originated approximately 40,000 years ago somewhere between Iran and Central China. In addition to the ethnicities previously mentioned, the progenitor of Haplogroup K was the patrilineal ancestor of nearly all modern Melanesians and Native Americans. Haplogroup K, in turn, is a subclade of Y-DNA Haplogroup F, which is believed to have originated in Northern Africa some 45,000 years ago. In addition to the ethnicities previously mentioned, the progenitor of Haplogroup F was probably the ancestor of all Indo-Europeans.

== Language ==
Their languages belong to the Khmuic language family, which is a branch of the Austro-Asiatic language family. Most scholars agree that the Khmuic languages are part of the Mon–Khmer branch of the Austro-Asiatic family, but the validity of the Mon–Khmer branch has recently been called into question.

== Society ==
The Khmuic are generally an agricultural people, although gathering, hunting, trapping and fishing are also parts of the Khmuic lifestyle.
