= Demographics of Laos =

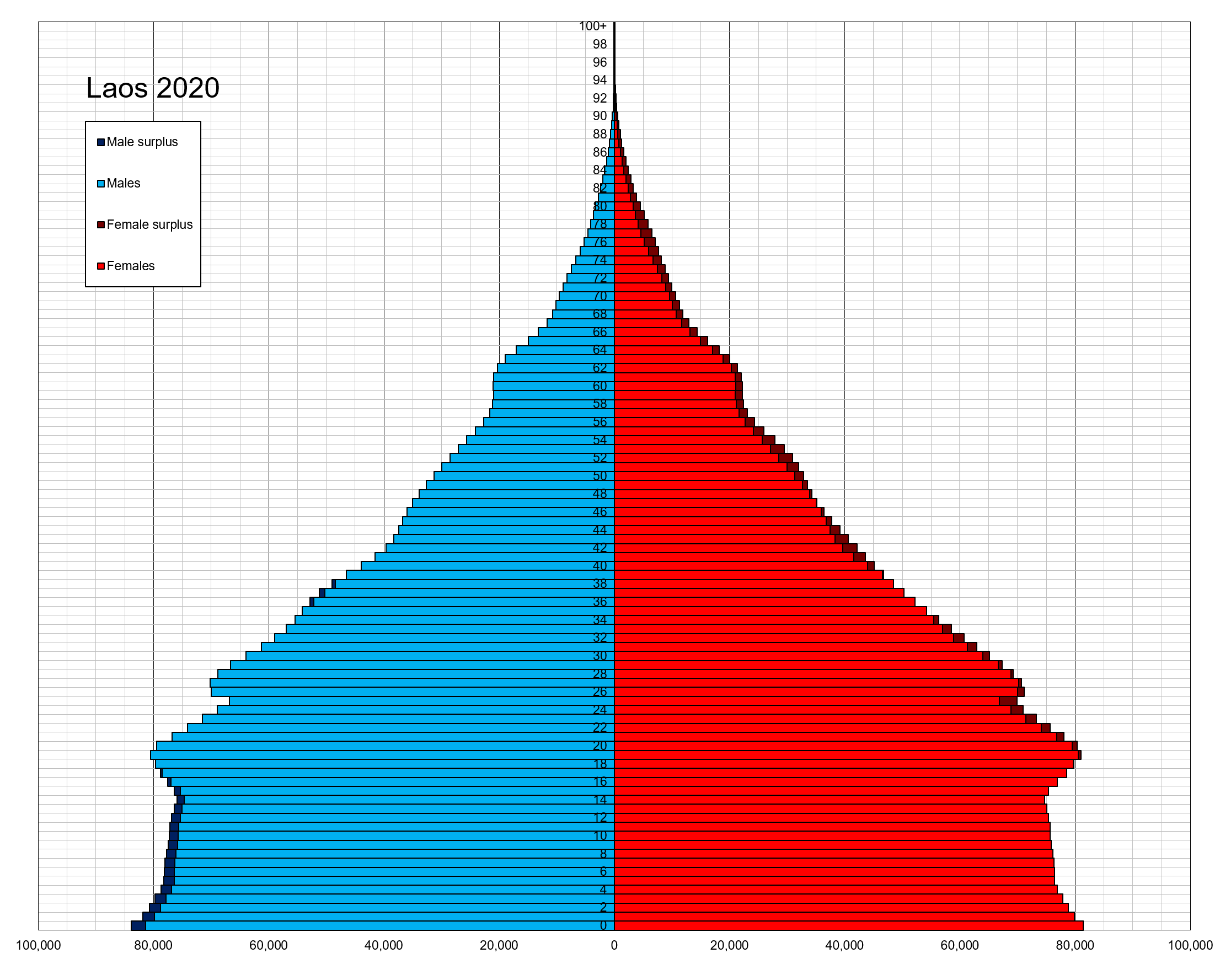
- Population pyramid of Laos in 2020
- Population: 7,443,000 (2022 est.)
- Growth rate: 1.41% (2022 est.)
- Birth rate: 20.9 births/1,000 population (2022 est.)
- Death rate: 6.8 deaths/1,000 population (2022 est.)
- Life expectancy: 67 years (2022 est.)
  - male: 66 years (2022 est.)
  - female: 69 years (2022 est.)
- Fertility rate: 2.48 children born/woman (2022 est.)
- Infant mortality: 36.8 deaths/1,000 live births (2022 est.)
- Net migration rate: −1.17 migrant(s)/1,000 population

Age structure
- 0–14 years: 30.80% (2022 est.)
- 15–64 years: 64.56% (2022 est.)
- 65 and over: 4.68% (2022 est.)

Sex ratio
- Total: 1.00 male(s)/female (2022 est.)
- At birth: 1.04 male(s)/female (2022 est.)

Nationality
- Nationality: Laotian
- Major ethnic: Lao (53.2%)

This article describes the demographic aspects of Laos.

== Population ==
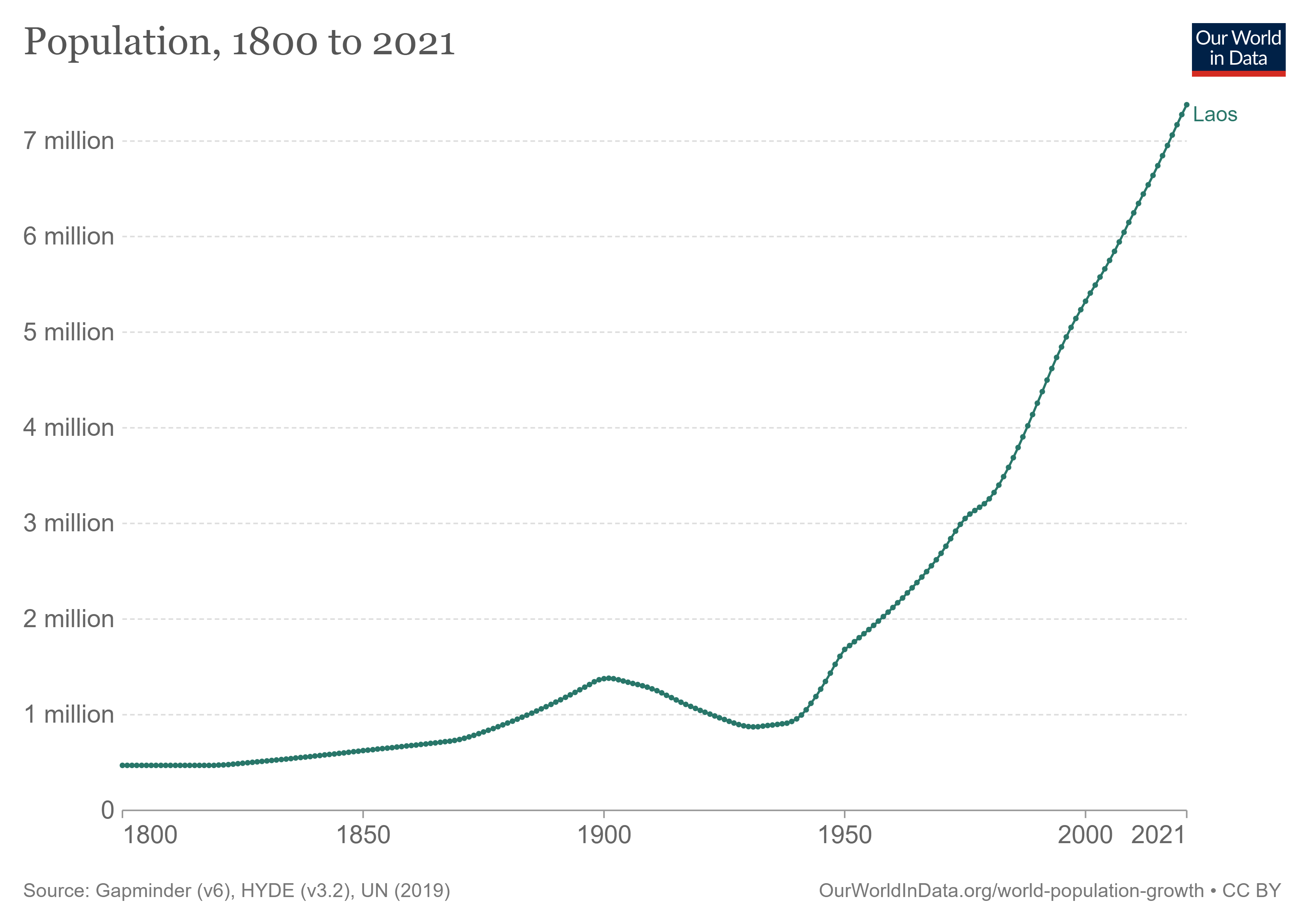
Population graph of Laos, number of inhabitants in millions between 1800 and 2021 (Our World in Data data, 2022)

=== Lao statistics bureau estimates ===
Year	Population	Live births	Deaths	Natural increase	Crude birth rate	Crude death rate	Rate of natural increase	TFR
1976	2,886,000							
1980	3,199,000							
1985	3,618,000							
1990	4,140,000							
1995	4,605,000				41.3	15.1	26.2	5.40
2000	5,218,000							
2005	5,619,000				34.7	9.8	24.9	4.50
2009					30.7	8.4	22.3	3.90
2010	6,256,000				29.9	8.0	21.9	3.70
2011	6,385,000				28.0	7.7	20.3	3.50
2012	6,514,000				28.1	7.4	20.7	3.40
2013	6,644,000				27.5	6.5	21.0	3.22
2014	6,809,000				26.6	6.3	20.3	3.03
2015	6,492,000				26.6	6.3	20.3	3.06
2016	6,787,000				24.6	7.7	16.9	2.90
2017	6,901,000				24.0	7.5	16.5	2.82
2018	7,013,000				23.3	7.4	15.9	2.76
2019	7,123,000				22.7	7.2	15.5	2.68
2020	7,231,000				21.2	7.0	14.2	2.50
2021	7,338,000				21.5	6.9	14.6	2.54
2022	7,443,000				20.9	6.8	14.1	2.48
2023	7,546,000							2.42
2024	7,647,000							2.36

=== Structure ===
Population by Sex and Age Group (Census 01.III.2005):

Age group	Male	Female	Total	%
Total	2,800,551	2,821,431	5,621,982	100
0–4	351 559	349 356	700 915	12.47
5–9	379 137	370 071	749 208	13.33
10–14	391 785	375 371	767 156	13.65
15–19	323 729	323 540	647 269	11.51
20–24	253 926	261 371	515 297	9.17
25–29	211 279	218 330	429 609	7.64
30–34	176 515	183 480	359 995	6.40
35–39	164 415	165 362	329 777	5.87
40–44	132 335	133 532	265 867	4.73
45–49	113 869	113 298	227 167	4.04
50–54	86 770	91 210	177 980	3.17
55–59	62 691	65 640	128 331	2.28
60–64	50 006	55 008	105 014	1.87
65–69	38 289	41 251	79 540	1.41
70–74	27 652	31 927	59 579	1.06
75–79	17 964	19 208	37 172	0.66
80–84	10 402	12 180	22 582	0.40
85–89	4 631	5 697	10 328	0.18
90–94	1 964	2 781	4 745	0.08
95–99	982	1 393	2 375	0.04
100+	480	936	1 416	0.03
unknown	171	489	660	0.01
Age group	Male	Female	Total	Per cent
0–14	1,122,481	1,094,798	2,217,279	39.44
15–64	1,575,535	1,610,771	3,186,306	56.68
65+	102 364	115 373	217 737	3.87

Population by Sex and Age Group (Census 01.III.2015):

Age group	Male	Female	Total	%
Total	3,254,770	3,237,458	6,492,228	100
0–4	346 462	335 521	681 983	10.50
5–9	345 380	333 829	679 209	10.46
10–14	363 026	355 580	718 606	11.07
15–19	354 360	344 650	699 010	10.77
20–24	325 601	328 436	654 037	10.07
25–29	308 988	307 000	615 988	9.49
30–34	250 383	245 851	496 234	7.64
35–39	212 523	207 560	420 083	6.47
40–44	170 808	173 062	343 870	5.30
45–49	149 656	146 251	295 907	4.56
50–54	127 272	140 146	267 418	4.12
55–59	98 615	98 992	197 607	3.04
60–64	74 106	73 073	147 179	2.27
65–69	47 563	51 338	98 901	1.52
70–74	32 930	38 497	71 427	1.10
75–79	21 871	25 207	47 078	0.73
80–84	13 519	16 671	30 190	0.47
85–89	6 744	8 523	15 267	0.24
90–94	3 041	3 995	7 036	0.11
95+	1 922	3 276	5 198	0.08
Age group	Male	Female	Total	Per cent
0–14	1,054,868	1,024,930	2,079,798	32.04
15–64	2,072,312	2,065,021	4,137,333	63.73
65+	127 590	147 507	275 097	4.24

Population Estimates by Sex and Age Group (01.VII.2020) (Because of rounding, totals are not in all cases the sum of the respective components. Estimates or projections based on the 2015 population census.):

Age group	Male	Female	Total	%
Total	3,622,996	3,608,214	7,231,210	100
0–4	392 890	376 310	769 200	10.64
5–9	397 353	389 566	786 919	10.88
10–14	371 259	362 687	733 945	10.15
15–19	355 474	346 423	701 896	9.71
20–24	346 620	342 462	689 083	9.53
25–29	327 955	325 732	653 687	9.04
30–34	293 003	292 362	585 365	8.09
35–39	254 782	251 614	506 396	7.00
40–44	208 008	206 509	414 517	5.73
45–49	173 373	172 659	346 031	4.79
50–54	143 504	149 136	292 640	4.05
55–59	117 622	123 171	240 793	3.33
60–64	90 651	97 330	187 982	2.60
65–69	62 968	66 823	129 791	1.79
70–74	40 691	45 525	86 216	1.19
75–79	23 916	28 997	52 912	0.73
80+	22 928	30 908	53 836	0.74
Age group	Male	Female	Total	Per cent
0–14	1,161,502	1,128,563	2,290,065	31.67
15–64	2,310,991	2,307,398	4,618,389	63.87
65+	150 503	172 253	322 756	4.46

=== UN estimates ===
Period	Live births per year	Deaths per year	Natural change per year	CBR^{1}	CDR^{1}	NC^{1}	TFR^{1}	IMR^{1}
1950–1955	80,000	37,000	43,000	44.8	20.9	23.9	5.94	167.1
1955–1960	87,000	40,000	47,000	43.2	20.1	23.1	5.96	160.1
1960–1965	96,000	44,000	52,000	42.4	19.3	23.1	5.97	153.5
1965–1970	107,000	47,000	60,000	42.3	18.7	23.6	5.98	147.0
1970–1975	122,000	52,000	70,000	42.5	18.1	24.4	5.99	140.5
1975–1980	132,000	54,000	78,000	42.2	17.2	25.0	6.15	132.4
1980–1985	145,000	56,000	90,000	42.2	16.2	26.0	6.36	122.6
1985–1990	165,000	56,000	109,000	42.1	14.4	27.7	6.27	107.6
1990–1995	180,000	53,000	127,000	40.0	11.9	28.1	5.88	88.3
1995–2000	170,000	48,000	122,000	33.6	9.4	24.2	4.81	70.8
2000–2005	154,000	44,000	110,000	29.9	9.1	20.8	3.90	
2005–2010	144,000	39,000	105,000	28.1	7.9	20.2	3.40	
2010–2015				25.6	7.0	18.6	2.93	
2015–2020				23.8	6.5	17.3	2.70	
2020–2025				21.4	6.2	15.2	2.48	
2025–2030				19.3	6.2	13.1	2.30	
^{1} CBR = crude birth rate (per 1000); CDR = crude death rate (per 1000); NC = natural change (per 1000); TFR = total fertility rate (number of children per woman); IMR = infant mortality rate per 1000 births

=== Total fertility rate, and crude birth rate ===
Total fertility rate (TFR) and Crude birth rate (CBR):

Year	Total		Urban		Rural	
Year	CBR	TFR	CBR	TFR	CBR	TFR
2011–2012	25	3.2	20	2.2	26	3.6
2017	22	2.7	18	2.1	23	3.0
2023	19	2.5	15	1.9	21	2.8

Total fertility rate and other related statistics by province, as of 2011–2012:

Province	Total fertility rate	Percentage of women age 15–49 currently pregnant	Mean number of children ever born to women age 40–49	Adolescent birth rate (Age-specific fertility rate for women age 15–19)
Vientiane Capital	2.0	3.8	3.1	37
Phongsaly	3.7	5.2	5.0	145
Luang Namtha	2.6	4.7	4.0	124
Oudomxay	3.6	3.9	5.7	138
Bokeo	3.6	4.9	5.0	149
Luang Prabang	3.1	5.4	5.3	95
Huaphan	3.8	5.9	5.9	137
Xayabury	2.2	3.8	3.8	83
Xieng Khuang	3.6	4.5	6.1	101
Vientiane Province	2.7	5.0	4.1	86
Borikhamxay	2.8	3.9	4.4	79
Khammouane	3.7	4.5	4.9	108
Savannakhet	3.5	6.3	5.4	99
Saravane	4.3	7.5	6.0	106
Sekong	4.5	6.9	5.9	107
Champasak	3.6	5.7	4.7	70
Attapeu	3.6	6.8	5.7	107

==== Before 1950 ====
Years	1925	1926	1927	1928	1929	1930	1931	1932	1933	1934
Total Fertility Rate in Laos	6.13	6.12	6.11	6.11	6.10	6.09	6.08	6.08	6.07	6.06

Years	1935	1936	1937	1938	1939	1940	1941	1942	1943	1944
Total Fertility Rate in Laos	6.05	6.05	6.04	6.03	6.02	6.01	6.01	6.00	5.99	5.98

Years	1945	1946	1947	1948	1949
Total Fertility Rate in Laos	5.98	5.97	5.96	5.95	5.95

=== Life expectancy ===
Period	Life expectancy in Years	Period	Life expectancy in Years
1950–1955	40.9	1985–1990	52.4
1955–1960	42.4	1990–1995	54.9
1960–1965	44.0	1995–2000	57.5
1965–1970	45.5	2000–2005	60.3
1970–1975	47.0	2005–2010	63.2
1975–1980	48.4	2010–2015	65.4
1980–1985	49.9		

Source: UN World Population Prospects

== Ethnic groups ==
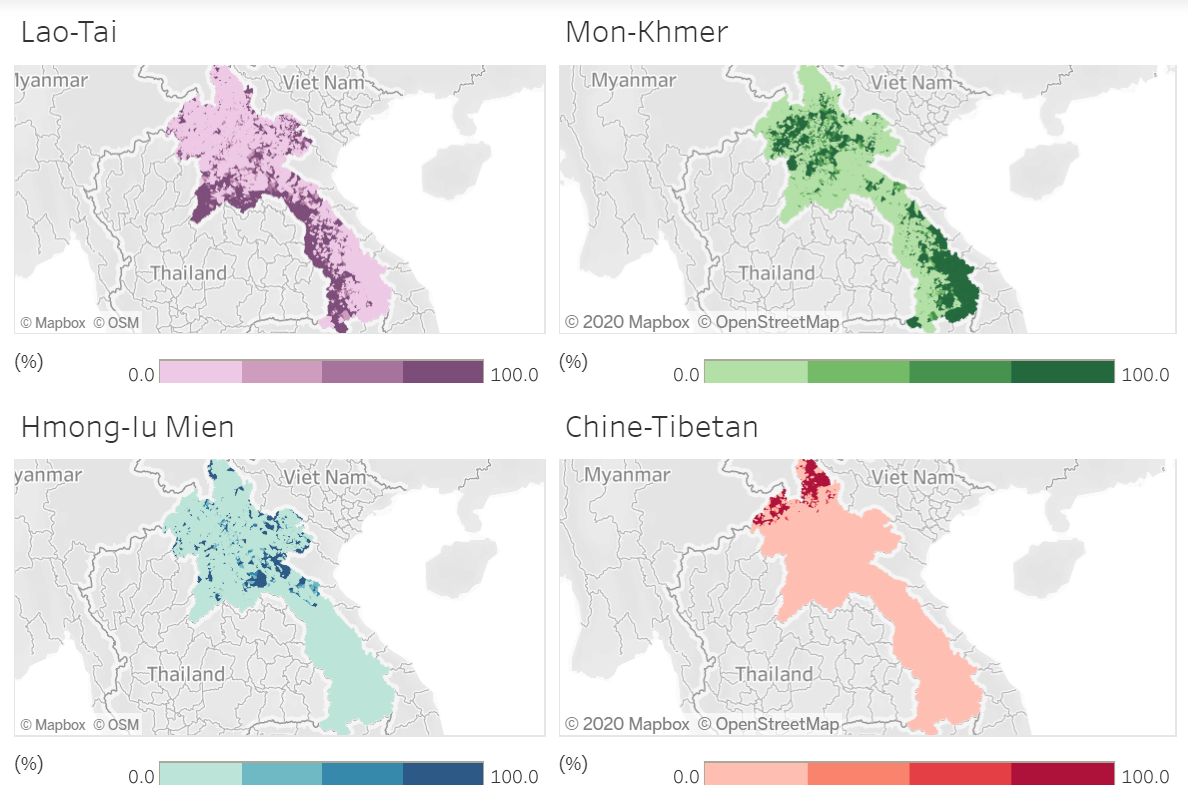
Ethno-linguistic groups in Laos (Lao-Tai, Mon-Khmer, Hmung-lu Mien, Sino-Tibetan)

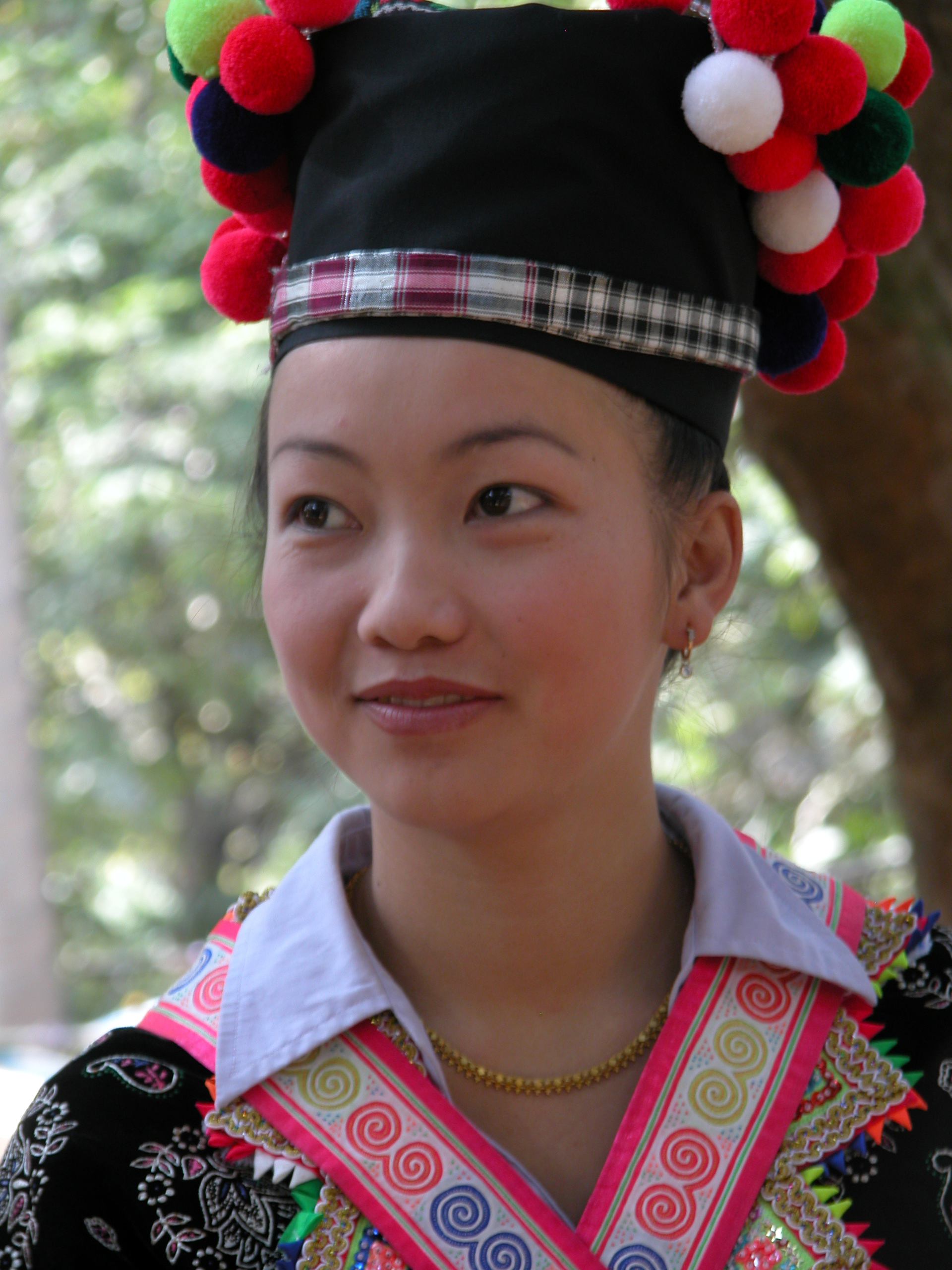
In Luang Prabang, a woman at the time of a Hmong Meeting Festival.

Some specialists are in agreement as to the ethnolinguistic classification of the ethnic groups of Laos. For the purposes of the 1995 census, the government of Laos recognised 149 ethnic groups within 47 main ethnicities. whereas the Lao Front for National Construction (LFNC) revised the list to include 49 ethnicities consisting of over 160 ethnic groups.

The term ethnic minorities is used by some to classify the non-Lao ethnic groups, while the term indigenous peoples is not used by the LPDR. These 160 ethnic groups speak a total of 82 living languages.

Lao 53.2%, Khmu 11%, Hmong 9.2%, and other (over 100 minor ethnic groups) 26.6% (2015 census).

Population of Laos according to ethnic group in 1985, 1995, 2005, and 2015
Ethnic group	Language family	census 1985		census 1995		census 2005		census 2015	
Ethnic group	Language family	Number	%	Number	%	Number	%	Number	%
Lao	Tai-Kadai	1,804,101		2,403,891	52.5	3,067,005	54.6	3,427,665	53.2
Khmu (Keummeu)	Mon-Khmer	389,694		500,957	11.0	613,893	10.9	708,412	11.0
Hmong (Mong)	Hmong–Mien	231,168		315,465	6.9	415,946	8.0	595,028	9.2
Thai (Tai)	Tai-Kadai	1,459				215,254	3.8	201,576	3.1
Tai Nuea	Tai-Kadai					14,799		11,622	0.2
Puthai (Phuthai or Phouthay)	Tai-Kadai	441,497		472,458	10.3	187,391	3.3	218,108	3.4
Lü (Lue or Leu)	Tai-Kadai	102,760		119,191	2.6	123,054	2.2	126,229	2.0
Katang	Mon-Khmer	72,391		95,440	2.1	118,276	2.1	144,255	2.2
Makong (So) (Bru)	Mon-Khmer	70,382		92,321	2.0	117,872	2.1	163,285	2.5
Akha (Kor)	Sino-Tibetan	57,500		66,108	1.4	90,698	1.6	112,979	1.8
Yrou (Laven, Loven, Jru', Yuroo)	Mon-Khmer	28,057		40,519	0.9	47,175	0.8	56,411	0.9
Xuay (Juk, Suai, Kui, Kuy, Suay, or Shuay)	Mon-Khmer	49,059		45,498	1.0	42,834	0.8	46,592	0.7
Singsily (Phounoy) (Singsiri)	Sino-Tibetan	23,618		35,635	0.8	37,447	0.7	39,192	0.6
Duon (Nhuon, Nghieu, San		33,240							
Taoey (Ta-oy)	Mon-Khmer	24,577		30,876	0.7	32,177	0.6	45,991	0.7
Nguan (Nguồn, Ngoaun, Nguane, Nguan or Nguane)	Mon-Khmer	988				29,442	0.5	27,779	0.4
Iewmien (Yao, Ewmien, Mien, Ilmearn)	Hmong–Mien	18,091		22,665	0.5	27,449	0.5	32,400	0.5
Phong	Mon-Khmer	18,165		21,395	0.5	26,314	0.5	30,696	0.5
Brao (Larvae)	Mon-Khmer	16,434		17,544	0.4	22,772	0.4	26,010	0.4
Katu	Mon-Khmer	14,676		17,024	0.4	22,759	0.4	28,378	0.4
Oey (Oy or Oi)	Mon-Khmer	11,194		14,947	0.3	22,458	0.4	23,513	0.4
Pray (Prai)	Mon-Khmer			15,000	0.3	21,922	0.4	28,732	0.4
Lamed (Lamet)	Mon-Khmer	14,355		16,740	0.3	19,827	0.4	22,383	0.3
Lahu (Musir, Mussor, Lahoo, or Lahou)	Sino-Tibetan	9,200		8,702	0.2	15,238	0.3	19,187	0.3
Kriang (Griang, Grieng, Ngae, or Ngeh)	Mon-Khmer	8,917		12,189	0.3	12,879	0.2	16,807	0.2
Hor (Haw, Ho, Hoa, Chin Haw, Yunnanese, Yunnanese Chinese, or Panthay)	Sino-Tibetan	6,361		8,900	0.2	10,437	0.2	12,098	0.2
Xingmoon (Puoc, Sing Mun, Xinhmun, or Xingmoun)	Mon-Khmer	2,164		5,834	0.1	8,565	0.2	9,874	0.2
Jeng (Cheng, Ceng, Chieng, Chenh, Jeng)	Mon-Khmer	4,540		6,511	0.1	7,559	0.1	8,688	0.1
Nhaheun (Nyaheun, Nahoen, Nha Heun, Nha Hon, Nya Hoen, Ngahearn, Nhahem)	Mon-Khmer	3,960		5,152	0.1	6,785	0.1	8,976	0.1
Kmer (Khmer, Kamer, Khome)	Mon-Khmer	169		3,902	0.1	5,825	0.1	7,141	0.1
Toum (Tum, Hung)	Mon-Khmer	2,042		2,510	0.05	4,458	0.08	3,632	0.05
Xaek (Saek or Sairk)	Tai-Kadai	2,459		2,745	0.06	3,733	0.07	3,841	0.05
Samtao (Sam Tao)	Mon-Khmer	2,359		2,213	0.05	3,533	0.06	3,417	0.05
Sila (Sida or Syla)	Sino-Tibetan	1,538		1,772	0.04	2,939	0.05	3,151	0.05
Tri (Chali, Cali, or So Tri)	Mon-Khmer	20,902		20,906	0.5	26,680	0.05	37,446	0.6
Harak (Alak, Alack, Hahak)	Mon-Khmer	13,217		16,594	0.4	21,280	0.04	25,430	0.4
Bid (Bit)	Mon-Khmer	1,530		1,509	0.03	1,691	0.03	2,372	0.04
Lolo (Alu)	Sino-Tibetan	842		1,407	0.03	1,691	0.03	2,203	0.03
Pako (Pacoh)	Mon-Khmer	12,923		13,224	0.3	16,750	0.03	22,640	0.4
Lavy (Lavi)	Mon-Khmer	584		538	0.01	1,193	0.02	1,215	0.02
Yae (Jeh, Gie, Yerh)	Mon-Khmer	3,376		8,013	0.2	10,570	0.02	11,452	0.2
Sadang (Sedang, Sdang, Gayong)	Mon-Khmer	520		786	0.02	938	0.02	898	0.01
Hanyi (Hayi or Hayee)	Sino-Tibetan	727		1,122	0.02	848	0.02	741	0.01
Guan (Kuan or Tai Guan)	Tai-Kadai					722	0.01	886	0.01
Oedou (Ơ Đu, Adoo)	Mon-Khmer					649	0.01	602	0.01
Yang (Giáy, Nhang, Dang, or Niang)	Tai-Kadai			4,630	0.1	616	0.01	5,843	0.1
Moy						534	0.01	789	0.01
Thin (Mal, Htin, or Thein)	Mon-Khmer	13,977		23,193	0.51	514	0.01		
Kree (Kri)	Mon-Khmer	110		739	0.02	495	0.01	1,067	0.02
Trieng (Talieng, Tariang, Caliang, or Treang)	Mon-Khmer	23,665		23,091	0.5	29,134	0.5	38,407	0.6
Kui (Yellow Lahu)	Sino-Tibetan	6,493		6,268	0.1				
Khir				1,639	0.04				
Numbri (Yumbri, Mlabri, or Yhumbri)	Mon-Khmer	67							
Yung						6,160			
Thaen								828	0.01
Mone (Meuang or Mon)		2,022		217	0.00				
Vietnamese		12,086							
Chinese		2,624							
Thai		1,459							
Cambodian		274							
Burmese		185							
Indian		44							
French		13							
Others & not stated		11,277		19,285	0.4	67,175	1.2		
Total		3,584,803		4,574,848		5,621,982		6,446,690	

== Sources ==
- CIA World Factbook
- Lao Statistics Bureau
