= Pray (disambiguation) =

To pray is to engage in prayer, an active effort to communicate with a higher being, deity, or spirit.

Pray may also refer to:

== Places ==
=== France ===
- Pray, Loir-et-Cher

=== Italy ===
- Pray, Piedmont, a comune in the Province of Biella

=== United States ===
- Pray, Montana, a census-designated place and unincorporated community in Park County, Montana, United States
- Pray, Wisconsin, an unincorporated community

== Pray as a surname ==
- Carl Pray (1870–1949), American college baseball coach
- György Pray (1723–1801), Hungarian Jesuit abbot, canon, librarian and historian
- P. Rutilius R. Pray (1793–1839), justice of the Supreme Court of Mississippi
- Phyllis Pray Bober (1920–2002), American art historian and professor

== Music ==
=== Albums ===
- Pray (Deen album), 2002
- Pray (Rebecca St. James album) or the title song, 1998
- Pray, by Andraé Crouch, 1997
- Pray, by Crematory, 2008

=== Songs ===
- "Pray" (Alicja song), 2026
- "Pray" (Justin Bieber song), 2010
- "Pray" (DJ BoBo song), 1996
- "Pray" (Tina Cousins song), 1998
- "Pray" (Tomoko Kawase song), 2006
- "Pray" (Lasgo song), 2002
- "Pray" (MC Hammer song), 1990
- "Pray" (Jessie Murph song), 2022
- "Pray" (Sanctus Real song), 2013
- "Pray" (Sam Smith song), 2017
- "Pray" (Take That song), 1993
- "Pray", by Babylon, 2015
- "Pray", by Dierks Bentley from Feel That Fire, 2009
- "Pray", by Flobots from Noenemies, 2017
- "Pray", by Got7 from Call My Name, 2019
- "Pray", by Illenium from Ascend, 2019
- "Pray", by I Prevail from Violent Nature, 2025
- "Pray", by Jay-Z from American Gangster, 2007
- "Pray", by JRY from Fifty Shades Darker: Original Motion Picture Soundtrack, 2017
- "Pray", by Nana Mizuki, a B-side of the single "Massive Wonders", 2007
- "Pray", by Bebe Rexha from I Don't Wanna Grow Up, 2015
- "Pray", by Royce da 5'9" from Layers, 2016
- "Pray", by Mumzy Stranger, 2015
- "Pray", by Smokepurpp and Murda Beatz from Bless Yo Trap, 2018
- "Pray", by SZA from S, 2013
- "Pray", by Vanilla Ninja from Love Is War, 2006
- "Pray", from the musical Once on This Island, 1990
- "Pray", an unreleased Kendrick Lamar song from Mr. Morale & the Big Steppers

== Other uses ==
- Pray (film), a film produced by Satoshi Fukushima
- Pray (graffiti), graffiti tag appearing in New York City in the 1970s-90s
- Pray, a name for several languages related to the Phai language of Thailand and Laos
- Pray people, an ethnic group in Thailand
- Pray Codex

== See also ==
- Prayer (disambiguation)
- Praying (disambiguation)
- Prays, a genus of moths
- Prey (disambiguation)

=== Distinguish from ===
- Prey
