= KEMU =

KEMU may refer to:

- King Edward Medical University, the oldest and one of the most prestigious medical schools in Pakistan
- Kenya Methodist University, a liberal arts university located in Meru, Kenya

== Geography ==
- Khmu people, one of the largest ethnic groups based in northern Laos
- Khmu language, language of the Khmu people of the northern Laos region, also spoken in Vietnam
