= Lua people =

Mon-Khmer ethnic group of Laos

Lua
Thin, Tʻin, Htin, ຖິ່ນ
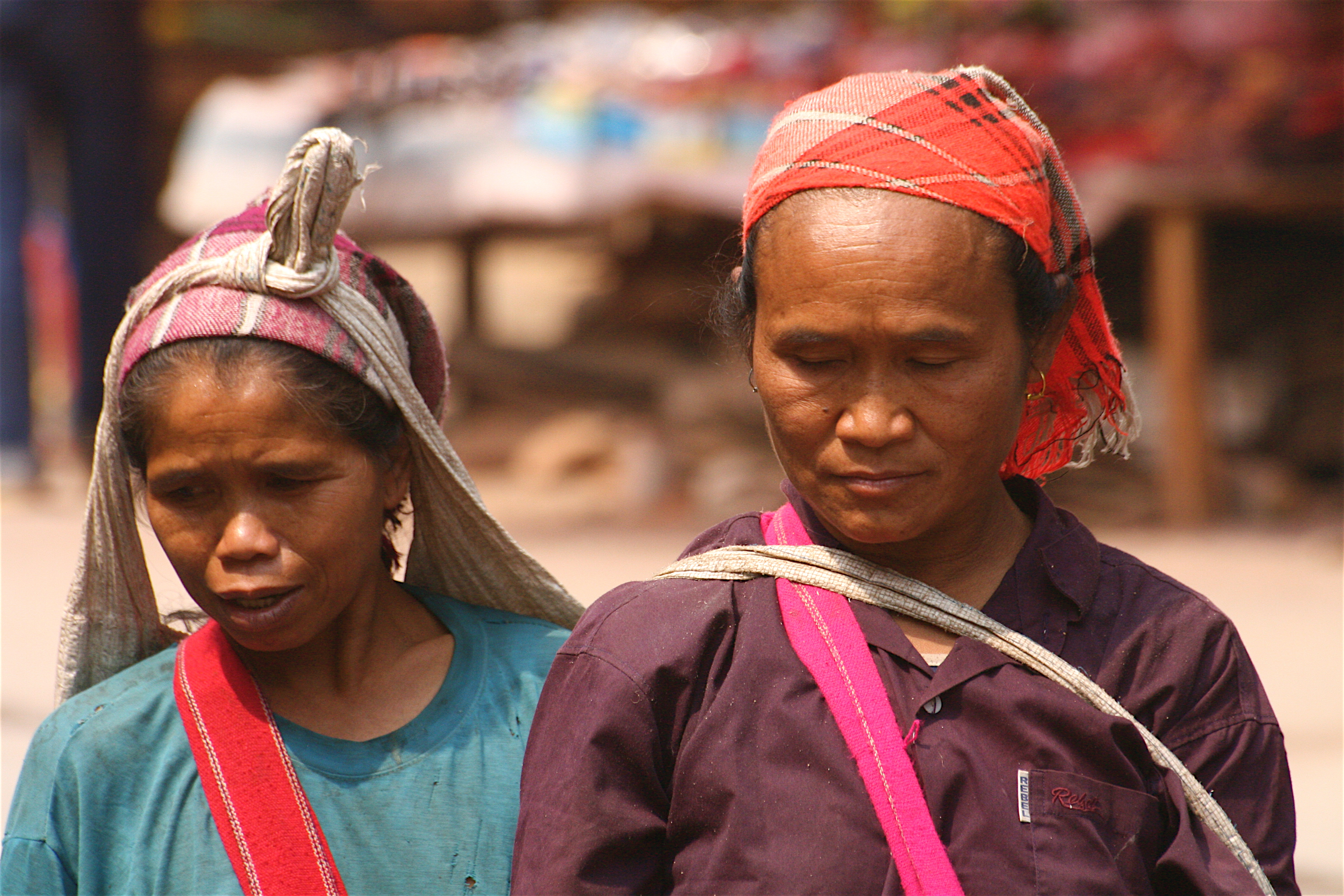
- Lua couple in Laos ( in Thailand)

Total population
- Unknown

Regions with significant populations
- Laos, Thailand, United States
- Laos: 23,193 (1995 census)
- Thailand: 48,000 (1995)

Languages
- Mal, Phai; Lao and/or Thai as second languages

Religion
- Animism, Shamanism, Theravada Buddhism, Christianity

Related ethnic groups
- Mlabri and Khmu

The Lua people (Phai pronunciation: [luaʔ]) are a Mon-Khmer minority ethnic group native to Laos, although there is now a sizable community living in Thailand. Luaʼ is their preferred autonym (self-designation), while their Lao neighbours tend to call them Thin (Tʻin or Htin; Lao: ຖິ່ນ Lao pronunciation: [tʰin]). Another term for this group is Lawa (but they have to be distinguished from the unrelated Lawa people in northern Thailand). There are two subgroups: the Mal and the Phai or Pray.

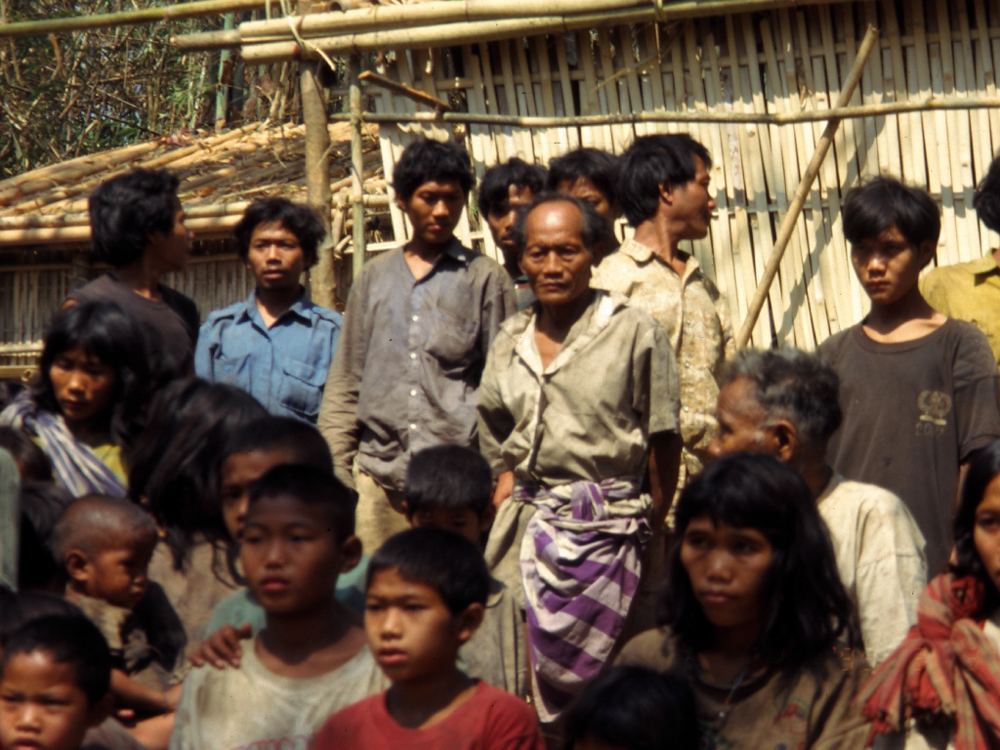
The Lua or Htin people, as well as the Mlabri people, represent the ancestral Austroasiatic-speakers as example as the indigenous population of Mainland Southeast Asia.

Their home region is in the provinces of Sainyabuli (Hongsa and Phiang districts) and Bokeo (Pak Tha District). In Thailand, most Lua settle in Nan province, close to the border with Laos.

== Language ==
The Lua speak Mal and Prai (or Phai), closely related, but not mutually intelligible languages, belonging to the Khmuic branch of the Austroasiatic languages.

== Cultural history ==
The Lua's traditional beliefs are characterized by animism and shamanism. Some Lua, influenced by their Lao and Thai neighbors, have adopted Theravada Buddhism, while a few have converted to Christianity, but without renouncing their original ethnic beliefs. The Lua believe that the natural surroundings are full of good and evil spirits. They worship their respective villages' local spirits. The most highly respected genie called bhuka is celebrated for three days during Lao New Year (Songkran). In order to win the spirits' blessings for a good harvest, a newlywed couple, help in cases of natural disasters or diseases, etc., the Lua try to appease them with offerings of pigs, poultry, rice or liquor. Traditional Lua villages display a "spirit gate" to protect them from all evils coming from the outside world. To mediate between the living and the spirit world, each village chooses a male shaman, called khawcam.

There is some academic debate whether the Lua have already settled in their present home area since the 1st millennium AD (like the Khmu) or migrated there from northern Vietnam in a later period. More certainly, the Lua of Thailand has only arrived there in the late-19th or early-20th century. Some scholars, however, believe that the Lua were the original inhabitants of Thailand's Nan Province, before moving to Laos and later re-migrating to their original homeland.

Following the communist victory in the Laotian Civil War (that was in the same period as the Vietnam War), many Lua families escaped Laos to seek refuge in the Luang Prabang Range area of Nan Province across the border in Thailand. There was a large concentration of Lua refugees at Ban Vinai Refugee Camp in Thailand. In the early 1970s and 1980s, Lua families relocated to the United States. Today, there is a large Lua community in the state of California, expanding from Santa Rosa, Fresno, Modesto, Stockton, Sacramento, and other parts of the state of California, and also including the states of Minnesota, Tennessee, Washington, Iowa, and Illinois. Families who remained in the camps in Thailand resettled in Sainyabuli and neighboring provinces in the mid-1980s and early 1990s, where the Lua people had been originally displaced due to the wars in Southeast Asia.
