= Prai =

Prai may refer to:

- Prai people, an ethnic group in Thailand and Laos
- Prai language, a Mon–Khmer language of Thailand and Laos
- Perai, a city in Malaysia
  - Perai River
  - Prai River Bridge
- Phosphoribosylanthranilate isomerase, an enzyme
- Jacob Prai (active 1971), Chairman of the Senate of the Republic of West Papua

== See also ==
- Prais (disambiguation)
