= Phai =

Phai can refer to:

- Phai people, an ethnic group in Thailand and Laos
- Phai language, the language of the Phai people
- phai (unit), a former Siamese measure of mass and a subdivision of the Siamese tical currency
