= Ksingmul =

Ksingmul (Xing Mul) may be,

- Ksingmul people
- Ksingmul language
