= Mlabri =

Mlabri can refer to:

- Mlabri people
- Mlabri language
