= Kammu =

Kammu can refer to:

- Emperor Kanmu
- Kammu language
- Kammu people
