= TYH =

, TYH or tyh may refer to:

- Tsan Yuk Hospital, a public hospital in Sai Ying Pun, Hong Kong
- Tyrosine hydroxylase the enzyme responsible for catalyzing the conversion of L-tyrosine to L-DOPA
- tyh, the ISO 639-3 code for the O'du language in Vietnam and Laos
