= Prais =

Prais may refer to:

- Luis Prais (1925–2005), Uruguayan footballer
- Sigbert Prais (1928–2014), British economist
- Prais–Winsten estimation, statistical method in econometrics
- Prais, literary pseudonym of Afrikan Spir (1837–1890), Russian philosopher
- Prai people

== See also ==
- Paris
- Prai (disambiguation)
- Praise (disambiguation)
