= Pheng language =

Pheng may refer to:

- Hung language
- Phong-Kniang language
