= Lamet =

Lamet may refer to:

- Lamet language
- Lamet people
- Dinelson Lamet
