= Jørgen Rischel =

Danish linguist (1934–2007)

- Born: 10 August 1934; Kullerup, Fyn, Denmark
- Died: 10 May 2007 (aged 72); Birkerød, Denmark
- Spouse: Anna-Grethe Rischel
- Children: 3

Academic work
- Discipline: Linguist
- Institutions: University of Copenhagen

Jørgen Rischel (Danish pronunciation: [ˈjɶɐ̯ˀn̩ ˈʁiɕl̩]; 10 August 1934 – 10 May 2007) was a Danish linguist who worked extensively with different subjects in linguistics, especially phonetics, phonology, lexicography and documentation of endangered languages.

== Childhood ==
As the third of four sons of Lutheran pastor Ejner Rischel, Rischel's early interest in other cultures was stimulated by a gifted primary school teacher in the Kullerup Public School on Fyn. From the age of 11 he attended the Nyborg Realskole (a private school with partial state funding), where he developed interests in chemistry, biochemistry and ornithology. In the garden of the Kullerup rectory he carefully recorded in musical notation the characteristic song and variations of over 20 different songbirds.

Having assembled a crystal radio receiver and transmitter, he once transmitted his mother Gunnild playing Schumann on her grand piano. Rischel's transmission accidentally interfered with a national Radio Denmark (Statsradiofonien) broadcast. His biographers suggest that this may have been "an early manifestation of what later became a serious research activity, namely the construction of the analog parallel synthesizer at the Institute of Phonetics in the late sixties."

Rischel's interest in linguistics developed whilst still at the Realskole in Nyborg. Aware of how the local Fyn dialect of Danish differed from the normative Copenhagen dialect, he also became interested in Norwegian after his school took a field trip to Norway. Having read Bernhard Karlgren’s introductory textbook on Chinese and a grammar of Old Norse, Rischel raised rabbits and sold them to earn the money to purchase a copy of Danmarks Runeinskrifter, a scholarly three-volume work on Danish runes edited by Lis Jacobsen and Erik Moltke and published during World War II.

== University studies ==
From 1952 to 1956 he studied Nordic philology at the University of Copenhagen, specializing in West Nordic, obtaining two one-year government scholarships to continue his studies in Reykjavík and Oslo. He took classes in Danish dialectology with Poul Andersen and in phonetics with Eli Fischer-Jørgensen. At Oslo he met linguist Einar Haugen, who was to be a great influence on Rischel's life.

== Career ==
In 1974 Rischel earned a doctorate in linguistics. He was a specialist in the Greenlandic language (Kalaallisut); his 1974 thesis was the most comprehensive phonological study of that language to date. He published extensively on topics in Danish, Faroese and Greenlandic, particularly phonetics and phonology.

From 1978 he was a professor of linguistics at the University of Copenhagen; from 1981 he was chair in phonetics; on his retirement in 1998 he became professor emeritus there.

In retirement he focused on Mon–Khmer languages; as a guest researcher at Mahidol University he did extensive fieldwork in Thailand and Laos, particularly on the Mlabri tribal language, an endangered and previously undescribed dialect of a Khmuic language. His 1995 book described Mlabri phonology, morphology and syntax whilst supplying a lexicon with illustrative examples.

== Honours and organizations ==
In 1978 he was elected a member of the Royal Danish Academy of Sciences and Letters. In November 1991 Rischel was knighted into the Order of the Dannebrog by Queen Margrethe II of Denmark. He had served as a co-editor of the International Journal of American Linguistics (a journal begun by Franz Boas in 1917).

== Selected publications ==
=== Co-author or contributor ===
- 1972, Jørgen Rischel, "Consonant Reduction in Faroese Noncompound Wordforms", in Firchow, E. S., Grimstad, K. Hasselmo, N. & W. A. O’Neil (eds.), Studies for Einar Haugen, presented by Friends and Colleagues, pp. 482–497.
- 1992, Jørgen Rischel, "A diachronic-typological view of the Faroese language" in The Nordic Languages and Modern Linguistics 7, Vol. I pp. 93–118. Jonna Louis-Jensen and J. H. W. Poulsen (eds.). Føroya Fródskaparfelag, Tórshavn.
- 1992, Jørgen Rischel, "Isolation, contact, and lexical variation in a tribal setting" in Language Contact, pp. 149–177. Ernst Håkon Jahr (ed.). Mounton-de Gruyter, Berlin - New York.
- 1995, Jørgen Rischel, Introduction to Aspects of Danish Prosody, pp. 3–20. Jørgen Rischel and Hans Basbøll (eds.). Odense University Press, Odense.
- 1995, Jørgen Rischel, "Sprog og begrebsdannelse" in Sprog og tanke - Fire essays, pp. 17–62. Poul Lindegård Hjorth (ed.)., Royal Danish Academy of Sciences and Letters, Copenhagen. (in Danish)
- 1998, I. Kleivan, C. Berthelsen, R. Petersen, Jørgen Rischel, B. Jacobsen: "Oqaatsinut Tapiliussaq / Oqaatsit Supplementsbind", Atuakkiorfik-Ilinniusiorfik, Nuuk, 184 pp. (in Greenlandic and Danish)

=== Books ===
- 1974, Topics in West Greenlandic Phonology. Copenhagen: Akademisk Forlag (Ph.D. thesis).
- 1995, Minor Mlabri: A Hunter-Gatherer Language of Northern Indochina. Museum Tusculanum Press, Copenhagen, 367 pp. ISBN 87-7289-294-3

=== Journals and symposia ===
- 1985, "Was There a Fourth Vowel in Old Greenlandic?" in International Journal of American Linguistics, Vol. 51, Issue 4, October 1985, pp. 553–554.
- 1990, "Fieldwork among spirits" in Journal of Pragmatics 13, pp. 861–869.
- 1990, "What is phonetic representation?" in Journal of Phonetics 18, pp. 395–410.
- 1991, "The relevance of phonetics for phonology: A commentary" in Phonetica 48, pp. 233–262.
- 1991, "Invariance in the linguistic expression, with digressions into music" (pp. 68–77), "Comments on the symposium" (pp. 434–440), and "Summary and discussion of speech and music combined" (pp. 429–433), all in Music, Language, Speech and Brain (Wenner-Gren International Symposium Series vol. 59). J. Sundberg, L. Nord and R. Carlson (eds.). Macmillan Press, London.
- 1992, "Acharn Kraisri and phonetic notation" in Thai-Yunnan Project Newsletter 18 (September 1992), pp. 16–18 (a discussion of the contributions of Acharn Krisri to comparative linguistics and the difficulty of devising a standard romanization system for transliteration of Thai).
- 1992, "Formal linguistics and real speech" in Speech Communication 11, pp. 379–392.
- 1993, "Lexical variation in two 'Kammuic' languages" in Pan-Asiatic Linguistics, Proceedings of the Third International Symposium on Language and Linguistics vol. III pp. 1451–1462. Amara Prasithathsint et al. (eds.). Chulalongkorn University, Bangkok.
- 2000. "The Dialect of Bernatzik’s (1938) 'Yumbri' refound?" in Mon-Khmer Studies, 30:115-122.
- 2004, Pan-dialectal databases: Mlabri, an oral Mon–Khmer language, Lexicography conference, Payap University, Chiangmai.
- 2004, In what sense is Mlabri a West Khmuic language?, presentation to 37th International Conference on Sino-Tibetan Languages and Linguistics, Mon–Khmer workshop, Lund University, October 2, 2004.
