= PNX =

PNX can stand for:

- Phong-Kniang (language code)
- Phoenix Companies (ticker symbol)
- Phoenix LRT station, Singapore (LRT station abbreviation)
- many of the other meanings of Phoenix (disambiguation)
- A Unix-like operating system developed by ICL for the PERQ workstation computer
