= Khuen people =

Khuen
Total population
- 9,500 (est.)

Regions with significant populations
- Laos, China

Religion
- Traditional religion, Theravada Buddhism

The Khuen (or Khuen, Kuan, Kuanhua, Kween, Khween, Khouen) people are an aboriginal ethnic group of Laos.

== Language ==
The Khuen speak a language also called Khuen, which is a Khmuic language. The Khmuic languages are Austro-Asiatic. There is some debate as to whether the Khmuic languages are of the Mon-Khmer branch, but the majority opinion is that they are not.

== Geographic distribution ==
- Population in Laos: 8000 in Luang Namtha Province
- Population in China: 1500, centered on Jinghong in Southern China
- Population in United States: Unknown

== Customs ==
As a fellow member of the larger Khmuic ethnic group, many aspects of Khuen culture are similar to the Khmu. Family names are usually the names of sacred animals or plants. It is taboo for a Khuen person to touch the animal or plant that bears his or her family name.

== Religion ==
In addition to Theravada Buddhism, they also worship a hierarchy of demons and ghosts. Ancestor worship is also practiced.
