= Pray people =

Pray
Total population
- 38,808

Regions with significant populations
- Thailand and Laos

Languages
- Pray, Thai

Religion
- Buddhism

The Pray are an ethnic group in Thailand.

== Name variation ==
The Pray are also commonly referred to as Pray 3 among social scientists, to disambiguate them from the related Phai people, who are also sometimes referred to as Pray (Pray 1).

== Language ==
The Pray speak a language also called Pray, which is a Khmuic language. The Khmuic languages are Austro-Asiatic. There is some debate as to whether the Khmuic languages are of the Mon-Khmer branch, but the majority opinion is that they are not.

== Geographic distribution ==
- Population in Thailand: 38,808
