= Prayer (disambiguation) =

Prayer is the active effort to communicate with a higher being, deity, or spirit.

(The) Prayer or Prayers may also refer to:

== Religion ==
- Absentee funeral prayer, a kind of funeral prayer in Islam
- Eid prayers, special prayers offered to celebrate the two Islamic festivals
- Friday prayer, a prayer that Muslims hold every Friday
- Nafl prayer, a type of optional Muslim prayer
- Rain prayer, a prayer to request rain from God in Islam
- Sunnah prayer, an optional or supererogatory prayer in Islam

== Music ==
=== Album ===
- Prayer (album), 2014 album by Robin Schulz

=== Songs ===
- "A Prayer", a song by Kings Kaleidoscope from their album 2016 album Beyond Control
- "Prayer", a 1934 song written by Richard Rodgers and Lorenz Hart for the movie Hollywood Party (1934 film)
- "Prayer", a song in the musical The Scarlet Pimpernel
- "Prayer", a 1997 song by Sevendust from Sevendust
- "Prayer", a 1999 song by Secret Garden from Dawn of a New Century
- "Prayer", a 2000 song by Neurosis from Sovereign
- Prayer (Disturbed song), a 2002 song by Disturbed
- "Prayer", a 2002 song by Celine Dion from A New Day Has Come
- "Prayer", a 2004 song by Nami Tamaki from Greeting
- "Prayer", a 2011 interlude by Serenity from Death & Legacy
- "Prayers", a 2006 song by In This Moment from Beautiful Tragedy
- "Prayers", a 2018 song by Good Charlotte from Generation Rx
- "The Prayer" (Celine Dion and Andrea Bocelli song), 1999 single by Céline Dion and Andrea Bocelli, from the film Quest for Camelot, and covered by numerous artists
- "The Prayer" (Bloc Party song), 2007 single by Bloc Party
- "The Prayer", a 2008 song by Kid Cudi from A Kid Named Cudi
- "The Prayer", a 2017 song by Lala Hsu from The Inner Me

=== Other ===
- Prayers (duo), American electronic rock duo

== Other uses ==
- "Prayer", a poem by Patti Smith in the book kodak
- Prayer (legal term), an official description of a plaintiff's demands
- "Prayer" (Farscape episode)
- The Prayer (film), a 2018 film
- The Prayer (sculpture), a 1909 bronze by Auguste Rodin

== See also ==
- Pray (disambiguation)
- Praying (disambiguation)
