= Po, Chiang Rai =

Po ปอ
- Tambon
- Interactive map of Po
- Country: Thailand
- Province: Chiang Rai
- District: Wiang Kaen

Population (2005)
  - Total: 15,946
- Time zone: UTC+7 (ICT)

Po (Thai: ปอ) is a village and tambon (subdistrict) of Wiang Kaen District, in Chiang Rai Province, Thailand. In 2005 it had a population of 15,946 people. The tambon contains 20 villages.
