= Mal language =

Austroasiatic language spoken in Laos and Thailand

Mal
- Thin
- Native to: Laos, Thailand
- Ethnicity: Mal
- Native speakers: (26,000 cited 1982 – 1995 census)
- Language family: Austroasiatic: Khmuic; Mal–Phrai; Mal

Language codes
- ISO 639-3: mlf
- Glottolog: mall1246

Mal, also known as Thin or T'in, is a Mon–Khmer language of Laos and Thailand. It is one of several closely related languages which go by the names Thin or Prai.

Tayten (300 speakers as of 1995) is spoken in the 2 villages of Ban Phia and Ban Tenngiou in Pakxeng District, Luang Prabang Province, Laos. It is either Thin or Tai Then.

== See also ==
- Lua people
