= Theen language =

Austroasiatic language spoken in Laos

Theen
- Native to: Laos
- Native speakers: (200 cited 1996)
- Language family: Austroasiatic: Khmuic; Theen

Language codes
- ISO 639-3: None (mis)
- Glottolog: thee1239

Theen ([tʰɛːn]) (Also known as Kha Sam Liam) is an Austroasiatic language of Laos, belonging to the branch of Khmuic languages. It is only spoken by about 200 people living in two villages. They are also known as Kha Sam Liam among their Lao neighbours.

Speakers of the autonym [pram tʰɛːn] are located in Viengkham district, Luang Prabang Province, Laos.
