= Praying (disambiguation) =

Praying is engaging in prayer, an active effort to communicate with a higher being, deity, or spirit.

Praying or Prayin' may also refer to:

- "Praying" (song), by Kesha, 2017
- "Prayin'" (Plan B song), 2010
- "Prayin'" (Johnny Logan song), 2013
- "Praying", a song by Keiino from Okta, 2020
- "Praying", a song by the Louvin Brothers from Nearer My God to Thee, 1957
- "Praying", a song by Seulgi from Accidentally on Purpose, 2025

== See also ==
- Pray (disambiguation)
- Prayer (disambiguation)
