= Muang Yai =

- Tambon
- Country: Thailand
- Province: Chiang Rai
- District: Wiang Kaen

Population (2005)
  - Total: 7,449
- Time zone: UTC+7 (ICT)

Muang Yai (Thai: ม่วงยาย, pronounced [mûa̯ŋ jāːj]) is a village and tambon (subdistrict) of Wiang Kaen District, in Chiang Rai Province, Thailand. In 2005, it had a population of 7,449 people. The tambon contains nine villages.
