= Pearlington, Mississippi =

- CDP
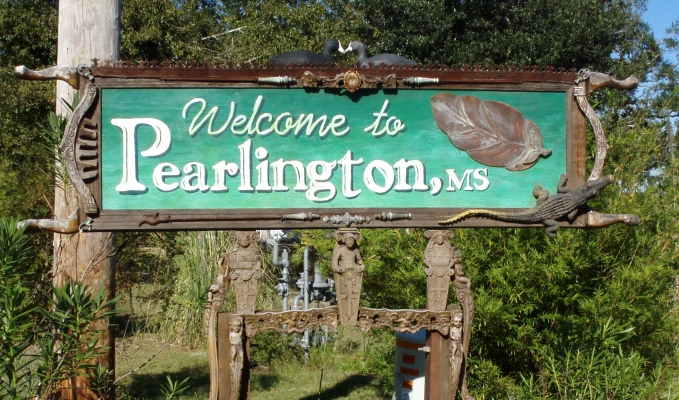
- Sign welcoming visitors to Pearlington

- Location of Pearlington, Mississippi

- Location in the United States
- Coordinates: 30°15′50″N 89°36′30″W
- Country: United States
- State: Mississippi
- County: Hancock

Area
  - Total: 9.54 sq mi (24.71 km^{2})
  - Land: 9.13 sq mi (23.64 km^{2})
  - Water: 0.41 sq mi (1.07 km^{2})
- Elevation: 3 ft (0.91 m)

Population (2020)
  - Total: 1,153
  - Density: 126.3/sq mi (48.77/km^{2})
- Time zone: UTC-6 (Central (CST))
  - Summer (DST): UTC-5 (CDT)
- ZIP code: 39572
- Area code: 228
- FIPS code: 28-55920
- GNIS feature ID: 2403402

Pearlington is a census-designated place (CDP) in Hancock County, Mississippi, United States, on U.S. Route 90, along the Pearl River, at the Louisiana state line. It is part of the Gulfport–Biloxi, Mississippi Metropolitan Statistical Area. As of the 2020 census, Pearlington had a population of 1,153. On August 29, 2005, Hurricane Katrina made landfall just south of Pearlington.

== Geography ==
According to the United States Census Bureau, the CDP has a total area of 9.6 square miles (25 km^{2}), of which 9.1 square miles (24 km^{2}) is land and 0.5 square miles (1.3 km^{2}) (4.91%) is water.

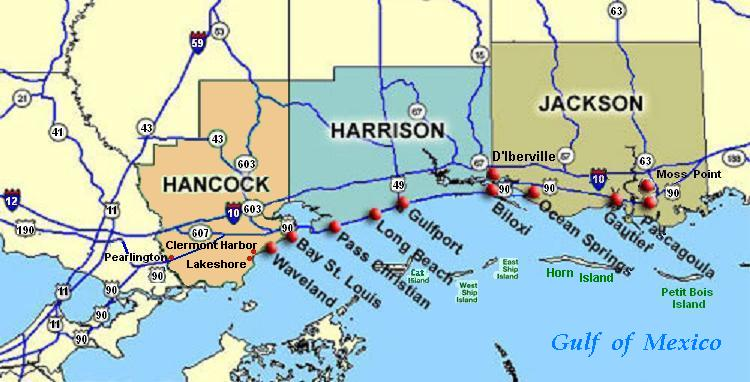
Pearlington, Mississippi (map left) is west of Waveland, on U.S. Route 90, along the Pearl River, at the state line with Louisiana.

== Demographics ==
Historical population
Census	Pop.	Note	%±
2020	1,153		—
U.S. Decennial Census

=== 2020 census ===
Pearlington racial composition
Race	Num.	Perc.
White (non-Hispanic)	812	70.42%
Black or African American (non-Hispanic)	228	19.77%
Native American	15	1.3%
Asian	6	0.52%
Other/Mixed	62	5.38%
Hispanic or Latino	30	2.6%

As of the 2020 United States census, there were 1,153 people, 371 households, and 215 families residing in the CDP.

=== 2000 census ===
As of the census of 2000, there were 1,684 people, 648 households, and 460 families residing in the CDP. The population density was 184.9 inhabitants per square mile (71.4/km^{2}). There were 830 housing units at an average density of 91.1 per square mile (35.2/km^{2}). The racial makeup of the CDP was 77.55% White, 20.43% African American, 0.36% Native American, 0.12% Asian, 0.12% from other races, and 1.43% from two or more races. Hispanic or Latino of any race were 1.37% of the population.

There were 648 households, out of which 31.5% had children under the age of 18 living with them, 52.3% were married couples living together, 11.9% had a female householder with no husband present, and 29.0% were non-families. 23.3% of all households were made up of individuals, and 9.4% had someone living alone who was 65 years of age or older. The average household size was 2.60 and the average family size was 3.08.

In the CDP, the population was spread out, with 25.8% under the age of 18, 7.3% from 18 to 24, 24.8% from 25 to 44, 29.1% from 45 to 64, and 12.9% who were 65 years of age or older. The median age was 40 years. For every 100 females, there were 99.3 males. For every 100 females age 18 and over, there were 103.4 males.

The median income for a household in the CDP was $31,224, and the median income for a family was $36,711. Males had a median income of $32,450 versus $25,948 for females. The per capita income for the CDP was $14,040. About 18.2% of families and 17.6% of the population were below the poverty line, including 13.0% of those under age 18 and 22.3% of those age 65 or over.

== Education ==
Pearlington is served by the Hancock County School District.

All of Hancock County is in the service area of Pearl River Community College.

== John C. Stennis Space Center ==
In 1961, Pearlington was one of six communities in Hancock County acquired by the federal government either wholly (Gainesville, Logtown, Napoleon, Santa Rosa, and Westonia) or in part (a section of northern Pearlington), to provide a 125,000 acres (506 km^{2}) acoustical buffer zone for what was envisioned to be NASA's main rocket testing facility, the John C. Stennis Space Center (SSC). These communities had a total population of 700 families, who were fully relocated from their former properties.

As of 2012, SSC is NASA's largest rocket engine test facility. It also provides testing facilities for more than 30 different state, national, international, public, and private rocket developers and manufacturers.

Remnants of the portion of Pearlington and the other five communities still exist inside the testing buffer zone at SSC. These include such features as city streets, now overgrown with grasses and shrubs, and a one-room school house.

== Hurricane Katrina ==
On August 29, 2005, at 10 am CDT (1500 UTC), Hurricane Katrina made a third landfall on Pearlington. The eye of the hurricane made direct contact with Pearlington, halfway between Biloxi and New Orleans. Hurricane Katrina came ashore during the high tide of 8:01 am, raising flood waters +2.2 feet more.

Hurricane Katrina damaged more than 40 Mississippi libraries. The Pearlington Public Library was a total loss, and it required a complete rebuild.

Almost a year later, a member of C.O.D.R.A. (Coalition of Disaster Relief Agencies) in Pearlington noted that all (but 2) homes, every building, and every vehicle in the town of 1600 was destroyed. The storm surge travelled 4.5 miles (7.2 km) inland to drown what little was left under 12–20 feet of toxic stew from the saltwater storm tide off the Gulf of Mexico.

The town was reduced to a site for survivors to get water, ice and military-issued meals from aid stations. There was no Red Cross or shelter. The houses were heaps of debris, and broken trees and nail-studded boards littered the roads. The people - perhaps 600 of the 1,700 residents - had to live in tents and under tarps. The elementary school buildings that were still standing were opened as shelters after the water went down.

Residents say that Pearlington was old and generally overlooked. It has been a segregated and isolated town. It has no mayor. The only form of government was the town's all volunteer fire department, West Hancock Fire Rescue, and its head, Chief Kim Jones.

After further damage from Hurricane Gustav in 2008, Pearlington began to rebuild.

== Notable people ==
- Ripley A. Arnold (1817–1853), founder of Camp Worth, eventually renamed Fort Worth, Texas
- Emma Sadler Moss (1898–1970), pathologist
- P. Rutilius R. Pray (1793–1839), Justice of the Supreme Court of Mississippi
