= Emma Sadler Moss =

American pathologist (1898–1970)

Emma S. Moss
- Born: Emma Sadler; September 19, 1898; Pearlington, Mississippi
- Died: April 30, 1970 (aged 71); New Orleans, Louisiana
- Education: Louisiana State University School of Medicine; University of Alabama School of Medicine
- Years active: 1939–1970
- Known for: First woman to serve as president of a major medical society in the U.S.
- Medical career
- Field: Pathology
- Institutions: Charity Hospital; Louisiana State University School of Medicine
- Sub-specialties: Parasitic, tropical, and mycotic diseases

Emma Sadler Moss (1898–1970) was an American pathologist and medical educator. She specialized in parasitology, tropical, and mycotic diseases. She was president of the American Society for Clinical Pathology in 1955 and 1956. She was the first woman to serve as president of a major medical society in the United States. She was a professor at the Louisiana State University School of Medicine and served as director of pathology at Charity Hospital in New Orleans for 30 years. She co-authored the 1953 book Atlas of Medical Mycology.

== Early life and education ==
Emma Sadler was born on September 19, 1898, in Pearlington, Mississippi, to Lou and Paul Sadler. She was born prematurely and was ill for much of her childhood. In 1915, she started her studies at the Mississippi State College for Women. She earned her BS in bacteriology in 1919. She then started working as a medical technologist at Charity Hospital in New Orleans.

In 1930, Moss undertook a two-year program at the University of Alabama School of Medicine. She then transferred to the Louisiana State University School of Medicine, earning her MD in 1935. She was elected to the Alpha Omega Alpha honor society. In 1939, she completed her residency in pathology at Charity Hospital in New Orleans.

== Medical career ==
In 1939, Moss was appointed acting director of Charity Hospital's Department of Pathology and joined the faculty of the LSU School of Medicine. She became director of the Charity Hospital Department of Pathology in 1940. In 1941, Moss established the first medical technology training program to require a baccalaureate degree. In 1945 and 1946 she was the acting head of the LSU School of Medicine's Department of Pathology. In 1951, LSU School of Medicine named her clinical professor of pathology. She specialized in parasitology and fungal diseases, teaching in the Department of Pathology and Bacteriology at Louisiana State University.

Moss joined the American Society for Clinical Pathology (ASCP) in 1938. She served on committees and the board of directors. In 1955 and 1956 she served as president of the society. She was the first woman in the United States to serve as president of a major medical society.

Moss authored scientific articles and book chapters on parasitology, tropical, and mycotic diseases. She co-wrote the 1953 book Atlas of Medical Mycology with Albert Louis McQuown.

During her career, Moss supervised and mentored 578 medical technologists and over 150 pathology residents. Moss's exhibits on mycotic infections, parasitology, and tropical diseases earned her Gold Medals from the ASCP. Her exhibit on "Fungous Diseases" earned her a Billings Gold Medal from the American Medical Association in 1954. The New Orleans branch of the American Medical Women's Association chose her as their Medical Woman of the Year in 1954. She received the Silver Distaff Award from Woman's Home Companion magazine in 1955. The pathology department of the LSU School of Medicine established the Emma Sadler Moss Lectureship in 1968.

Moss was the Director of Pathology at Charity Hospital until 1970. She died on April 30, 1970, in New Orleans.

== Personal life ==
Moss was married to John Moss. He died of tuberculosis in 1929. She had no children and did not remarry.
