= Prey (disambiguation) =

Prey are organisms attacked and eaten by other organisms.

Prey may also refer to:

== Places ==
- Prey, Eure, a commune in Eure, France
- Prey, Vosges, a commune in Vosges, France
- Prey Veng Province, Cambodia
  - Prey Veng (city), capital of the province

== People ==
- Edmond Lefebvre du Prey (1866–1955), French politician (family name is Lefebvre du Prey)
- Hermann Prey (1929–1998), German lyric baritone

== Arts, entertainment, and media ==
=== Film ===
- The Prey (1920 film), American drama film directed by George L. Sargent
- The Prey (1921 film), a French-Italian silent film
- The Prey (1974 film), an Italian erotic film
- Prey (1977 film), a low-budget British science-fiction horror film, directed by Norman J. Warren
- The Prey (1983 film), an American horror film, written and directed by Edwin Brown
- Prey (2007 film), a South African horror film
- Prey (2009 film), a low-budget Australian supernatural horror film
- The Prey (2011 film), a French film with the French title La Proie
- Prey (2016 film), a Dutch film directed by Dick Maas with the Dutch title Prooi
- The Prey (2016 film), a 2016 American film produced by Juan Feldman
- The Prey (2018 film), a US-Cambodian action film
- Prey (2019 Canadian film), a Canadian documentary film about sexual abuse in the Catholic Church
- Prey (2019 American film), an American horror film directed by Franck Khalfoun
- Prey (2021 film), a German thriller film distributed by Netflix
- Prey (2022 film), an American film in the Predator franchise
- Prey (2024 film), an American action thriller film starring Ryan Phillippe and Emile Hirsch

=== Literature ===
- Prey (novel), by Michael Crichton
- "Prey", a short story by Richard Matheson, basis for the "Devil Doll" segment of the film Trilogy of Terror
- Prey: Immigration, Islam, and the erosion of women's rights, a 2021 non-fiction book by Ayaan Hirsi Ali
- Batman: Prey, a Batman comics story arc

=== Music ===
==== Albums ====
- Prey (Tiamat album), 2003
- Prey (Planes Mistaken for Stars album), 2016

==== Songs ====
- "The Prey" (song), a 1981 B-side by the Dead Kennedys
- "Prey", a song by Brutal Truth from the 1997 album Sounds of the Animal Kingdom
- "Prey", a song by 10 Years from the 2005 album The Autumn Effect
- "Prey", a song by Recoil from the 2007 album subHuman
- "The Prey", a song by Suede from the 2022 album Autofiction

=== Television ===
- Prey (American TV series), a 1998 science-fiction series starring Debra Messing
- Prey (British TV series), an ITV 2014–2015 detective-drama series starring Rosie Cavaliero
- "Prey" (FBI), a 2018 episode
- "Prey" (Star Trek: Voyager), a 1998 episode
- "Prey" (The Walking Dead), a 2013 episode
- "Prey", season 3, episode 5 of Animal Kingdom

=== Video games ===
- Prey (2006 video game), a first-person shooter developed by Human Head Studios
- Prey (2017 video game), a first-person shooter developed by Arkane Studios

== Other uses ==
- Prey (software), a service for tracking stolen electronic devices

== See also ==
- Pray (disambiguation)
