= P. Rutilius R. Pray =

American judge (–)

Publius Rutilius Rufus Pray (June 10, 1793 – December 11, 1839) was a justice of the Supreme Court of Mississippi from 1838 to 1839.

Born Rufus Pray in Maine, on June 10, 1793, he was the son of Ebenezer Gray and Rebecca Learned. Rufus later appended "Publius Rutilius" to his name in honor of the Roman statesman Publius Rutilius Rufus. He entered the practice of law in Hancock County, Mississippi. He represented Hancock County in the Mississippi House of Representatives from 1827 to 1829. He served as president of the Mississippi Constitutional Convention of 1832. Pray "resided at Pearlington, near the sea coast, where lands were held mainly under old French and Spanish grants. He attended the courts in New Orleans and thus acquired a taste for the civil law". In 1833, he was empowered by the legislature to revise the statutes of the State. In doing the work he was "ambitious of originality" and caused the code "to smack too strongly of the Roman law". This displeased legislators who preferred the common law, and the proposed code was rejected.

Pray was elected to a seat on the state supreme court in 1837 and held the position until his death in 1839. He died at his residence, near Pearlington, Mississippi, after a lengthy period of poor health.

Political offices
Preceded by Cotesworth P. Smith	Justice of the Supreme Court of Mississippi; 1838–1839	Succeeded by Cotesworth P. Smith
