= Lai Ngao =

Lai Ngao หล่ายงาว
- Tambon
- Country: Thailand
- Province: Chiang Rai
- District: Wiang Kaen

Population (2005)
  - Total: 3,490
- Time zone: UTC+7 (ICT)

Lai Ngao (Thai: หล่ายงาว) is a village and tambon (subdistrict) of Wiang Kaen District, in Chiang Rai Province, Thailand. In 2005, it had a population of 3,490 people. The tambon contains six villages.
