= Wiang Kaen district =

Wiang Kaen เวียงแก่น
- District
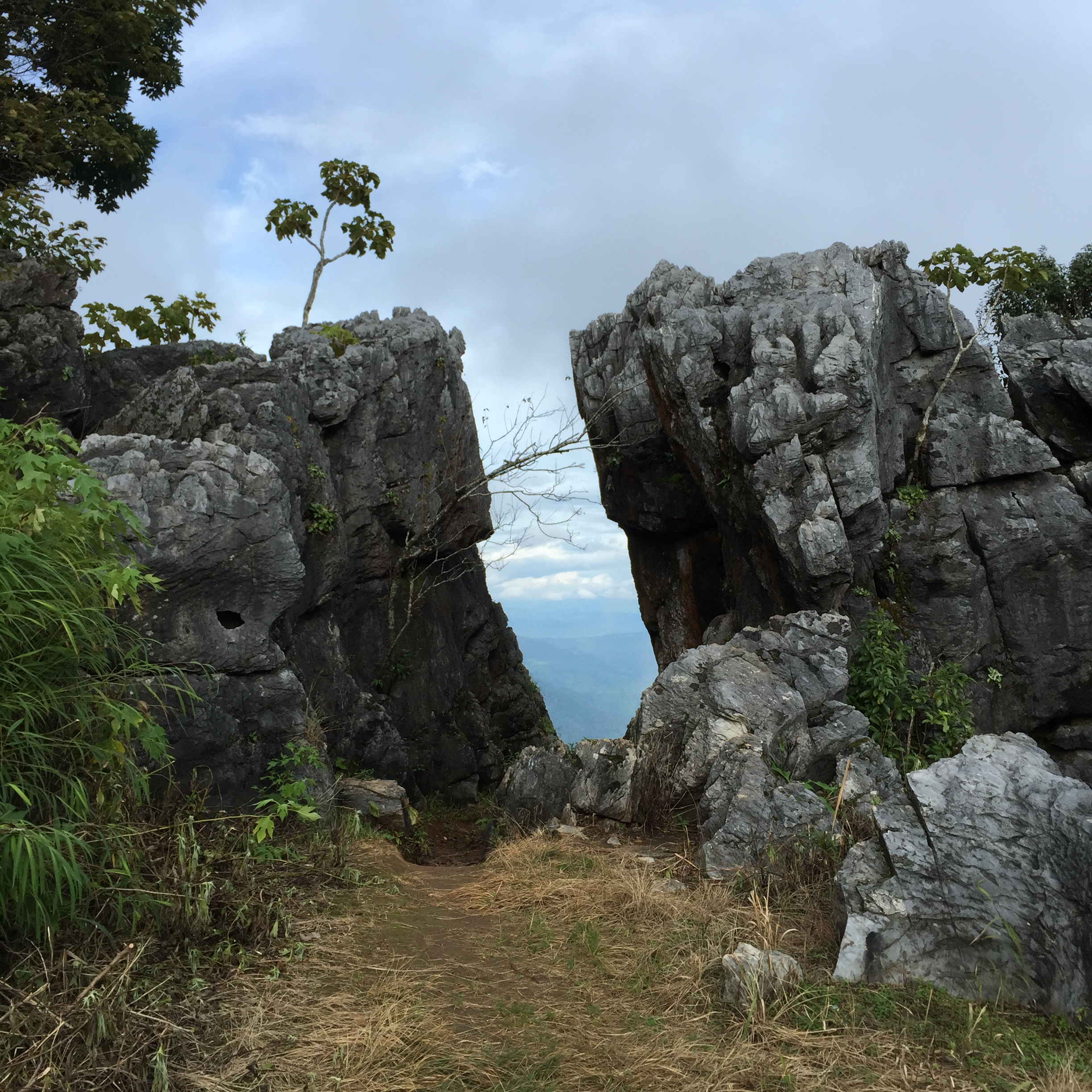
- Hills in Po, Wiang Khean

- District location in Chiang Rai province
- Coordinates: 20°6′44″N 100°30′49″E
- Country: Thailand
- Province: Chiang Rai
- Seat: Muang Yai

Area
  - Total: 526.0 km^{2} (203.1 sq mi)

Population (2005)
  - Total: 32,310
  - Density: 61.4/km^{2} (159/sq mi)
- Time zone: UTC+7 (ICT)
- Postal code: 57310
- Geocode: 5713

Wiang Kaen (Thai: เวียงแก่น; IPA: [wīaŋ kɛ̀n]) is the easternmost district (amphoe) of Chiang Rai province, northern Thailand.

== History ==
Historically, the area was Mueang Wiang Kaen, on the Ngao River. It was founded about the same time of Sukhothai Kingdom and Chiang Rai.

The government separated the three tambons Muang Yai, Po, and Lai Ngao from Chiang Khong district to create a minor district (king amphoe) on 1 April 1987. It was upgraded to a full district on 7 September 1995.

== Geography ==
Neighboring districts are (from the south clockwise) Thoeng, Khun Tan, Chiang Khong of Chiang Rai Province. To the east lies Bokeo province of Laos.

Phu Chi Fa, 1,442 m high, lies at the border with Thoeng District.

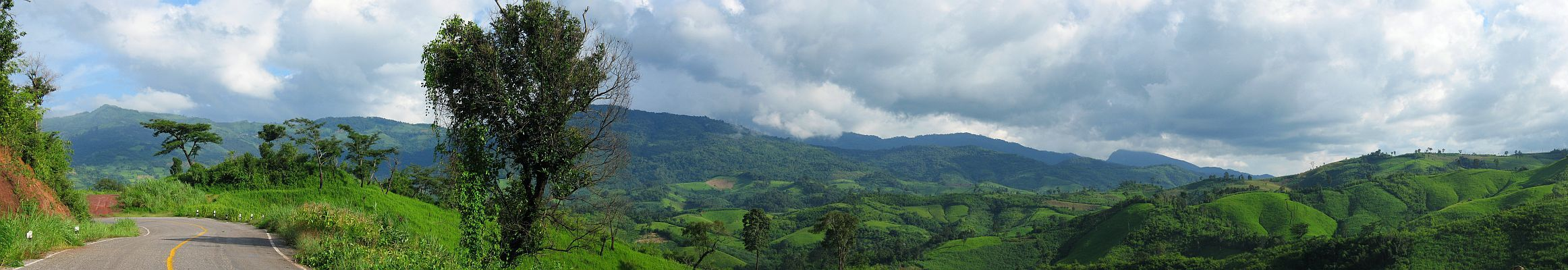
The Phi Pan Nam Range mountain range in Wiang Kaen District

== Administration ==
The district is divided into four sub-districts (tambons), which are further subdivided into 41 villages (mubans). There are no municipal (thesabans), and four tambon administrative organizations (TAO).

| No. | Name | Thai name | Villages | Pop. |
|---|---|---|---|---|
| 1. | Muang Yai | ม่วงยาย | 9 | 7,449 |
| 2. | Po | ปอ | 20 | 15,946 |
| 3. | Lai Ngao | หล่ายงาว | 6 | 3,490 |
| 4. | Tha Kham | ท่าข้าม | 6 | 5,425 |

== Economy ==
Pomelo is an important fruit and income-generating product for the district.
