= Mlabri language =

Austroasiatic language spoken in Laos and Thailand

Mlabri
- Yumbri
- Native to: Thailand, Laos
- Native speakers: 130 (2007)
- Language family: Austroasiatic: Khmuic; Mlabri

Language codes
- ISO 639-3: mra
- Glottolog: mlab1235
- ELP: Mlabri

Mlabri is a language spoken by the Mlabri people in the border area between Thailand and Laos.

It is usually classified as a Khmuic language, a subgroup of the Austroasiatic languages. Linguist Jørgen Rischel has studied the language and described its peculiarities in several works. He divides the language into three varieties: one spoken by a small group in Laos and previously called Yumbri, and two others spoken by larger groups in Thailand. They differ in intonation and in lexicon.

Although it is possible to count up to ten in Mlabri, only the numerals one and two may be used to modify a noun, and the word for 'two' has uses closer to 'pair' or 'couple' in English than a numeral.

== Phonology ==
Mlabri distinguishes rounding in its back vowels. It does not have the register systems of some other Austroasiatic languages.

	Front	Back	
	Front	unrounded	rounded
Close	i	ɯ	u
Close-mid	e	ɤ	o
Open-mid	ɛ	ʌ	ɔ
Open	a		

All vowels occur long and short. /a/ is fronted after palato-alveolar consonants, and may approach [ɛ]. There is also a very short vowel /ɪ/ that has limited distribution. Schwas occur in pre-tonic syllables, but may be epenthetic. There are several diphthongs.

Consonants include the two implosive stops /ɓ/ and /ɗ/, attested in words such as ɓuʔ 'slow' and ɗɤŋ 'can'. These apparent implosive stops could be analyzed as pre-glottalized stops, as pre-glottalization is also a used for sonorants. Consonants also include voiceless sonorants, as in m̥ɛʔ 'new', n̥taʔ 'tail', ŋ̊uh 'sit', l̥ak '(there is) none', or w̥ep 'shoulder'. Arguably, these could be analyzed as a sequence of /h/ and a sonorant.

Initial consonants
		Labial	Alveolar	Palatal	Velar	Glottal
Obstruent	aspirated	pʰ	tʰ	cʰ ~ s	kʰ	h
Obstruent	tenuis	p	t	c	k	ʔ
Obstruent	voiced	b	d	ɟ	ɡ	
Obstruent	glottalized	ˀb ~ ɓ	ˀd ~ ɗ			
Nasal	voiced	m	n	ɲ	ŋ	
Nasal	voiceless	m̥	n̥	ɲ̥	ŋ̊	
Sonorant	voiced	w	l, r	j, j̊		
Sonorant	voiceless	w̥	l̥, (r̥)			
Sonorant	glottalized	ˀw		ˀj		

/r̥/ is only attested in minor syllables.

Mlabri has a different set of consonants which occur at the ends of syllables, including aspirated sonorants /lʰ, rʰ, jʰ/. The second is a trill, and the third more post-alveolar than palatal. Other final consonants are /p t c k ʔ m n ɲ ŋ h l r j w/
