= Khmu language =

Austroasiatic language spoken in Laos, Vietnam, Thailand and China

Khmu
- Kmhmu ກຶມຫມຸ กำมุ
- Native to: Laos, Vietnam, Thailand, China
- Ethnicity: Khmu
- Native speakers: (798,400 cited 1990–2015 census)
- Language family: Austroasiatic: Khmuic; Khmu
- Writing system: Lao, Latin, Thai

Language codes
- ISO 639-3: Either: kjg – Khmu khf – Buddhist Khmu (Kmhmu' Khwen)
- Glottolog: khmu1255
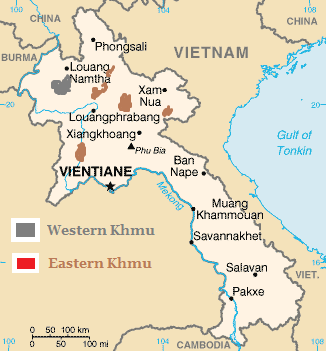
- Approximate location of Khmu dialects in Laos

Khmu ([kʰmuʔ], also written Kammu, Khmu') is the language of the Khmu people of the northern Laos region. It is also spoken in adjacent areas of Vietnam, Thailand and China. Khmu lends its name to the Khmuic branch of the Austroasiatic language family, the latter of which also includes Khmer and Vietnamese. Within Austroasiatic, Khmu is often cited as being most closely related to the Palaungic and Khasic languages. The name "Khmu" can also be seen romanized as Kmhmu, Khmu', Kammu, or Khamuk in various publications or alternatively referred to by the name of a local dialect.

== Dialects ==
Khmu has several dialects but no standard variety. Dialects differ primarily in consonant inventory, existence of register, and the degree to which the language has been influenced by the surrounding national language(s). Dialects are, for the most part, mutually intelligible; however communication can be difficult between speakers of geographically distant dialects.

The dialects of Khmu can be broadly categorized into two groups, Western Khmu and Eastern Khmu.

- Western Khmu dialects have fewer consonant phonemes and instead use phonemic register contrast, as seen in other Austroasiatic languages, of "lax" breathy register and "tense" modal register. In at least one dialect of Western Khmu, known as Khmu Rook, tonogenesis is evident as the register contrast has developed into a system of two phonetic tones with six phonemic realizations.
- Eastern Khmu dialects show the opposite tendency. Completely lacking either register or tone distinction, these dialects utilize a three-way distinction of stops (voiced, voiceless and aspirated voiceless) and nasals (voiced, voiceless, and pre-glottalized) in the syllable-initial position for phonemic contrast.

=== Suwilai Premsrirat (2002) ===
Suwilai Premsrirat (2002) reports the following locations and dialects of Kmhmu' in Laos, Vietnam, China, and Thailand.

- Laos: spoken in the 8 northern provinces of Luang Namtha, Udomsai, Bokeo, Sayaburi, Phongsali, Luang Prabang, and Xiaq kvaaq, with a few villages near Vientiane. Dialects include Kmhmu' Rook, Khmu Lw, and Kmhmu' Cwaq (also known as Kmhmu' Uu).
- Vietnam: Kim Hua, Sop Pot, Sop Caw and Pung Kamong Villages, Kim Da Subdistrict, Tương Dương District, Vinh City, Nghệ An Province. Also in Lai Châu Province, Sơn La Province, and Thanh Hóa Province.
- China: Pung Soa village (more conservative with voicing contrasts in the initial consonants) and Om Kae village (has tonal contrasts) in Sipsongpanna, Yunnan
- Thailand: many villages, including the representative datapoint of Huai Ian village, Lai Ngao subdistrict, Wiang Kaen district, Chiang Rai province (originally from Pak Bang district of Laos, where the language is called Khmu Khrong, meaning 'Mekong Khmu'). Also in Nan province and Lampang province.

== Phonology ==
=== Consonants ===
The consonant inventory of the Cuang variety of Khmu' is shown in the table below. The phoneme /f/, present in dialects of both Eastern and Western Khmu', is a result of borrowings from the surrounding Tai languages.

Khmu Cuang onsets
		Labial	Alveolar		Palatal	Velar	Glottal
Plosive	Aspirated	pʰ	tʰ		cʰ	kʰ	
Plosive	Voiceless	p	t		c	k	ʔ
Plosive	Voiced	b	d		ɟ^{1}	ɡ^{1}	
Nasal	Voiceless^{1}	m̥	n̥		ɲ̥	ŋ̊	
Nasal	Voiced	m	n		ɲ	ŋ	
Nasal	Preglottalized^{1}	ˀm	ˀn		ˀɲ	ˀŋ	
Fricative		(f)	s				h
Approximant	Voiceless^{1}	w̥^{2}	l̥	r̥	j̊		
Approximant	Voiced	w	l	r	j		
Approximant	Preglottalized^{1}	ˀw			ˀj		

1. Only found in Eastern Khmu dialects.
2. w̥ is a voiceless labio-velar approximant.

Khmu Cuang codas
	Bilabial	Alveolar	Palatal	Velar	Glottal
Plosive	p	t	c	k	ʔ
Nasal	m	n	ɲ	ŋ	
Fricative			ç		h
Approximant	w	l r	j		

=== Vowels ===
The vowels of the Khmu' language show little variation across the dialects with all varieties having 19 monophthongs and three diphthongs (/iə/, /ɨə/ and /uə/).

	Front		Central		Back	
	short	long	short	long	short	long
Close	i	iː	ɨ	ɨː	u	uː
Close-mid	e	eː	ə	əː	o	oː
Open-mid	ɛ	ɛː		ʌː	ɔ	ɔː
Open			a	aː		

== Grammar ==
=== Pronouns ===
Person	Singular	Dual	Plural
1st	ໂອະ (òɂ)	ອະ (àɂ)	ອິ (ìɂ)
2nd	ແຢະ (jɛ̀ɂ) (masculine), ປາ (pàː) (feminine)	ສວາ (swáː)	ປໍ (pɔ̀ː)
3rd	ກັຽ (kəː) (masculine), ນາ (nàː) (feminine)	ສນາ (snáː)	ນໍ (nɔ̀ː)

=== Syntax ===
Khmu uses mainly an SVO word order although an OVS order is also possible.

== Vocabulary ==
=== Numeral ===
Cardinal	/nɨŋ/	/sɔ́ːŋ/	/sáːm/	/síː/	/háː/	/rók/	/cét/	/pɛ́t/	/káw/	/síp/
Cardinal	ນຶງ	ສອງ	ສາມ	ສີ	ຫາ	ຣົກ	ເຈຕັ	ແປດ	ເກົ້າ	ສິບ
Cardinal	1	2	3	4	5	6	7	8	9	10
Ordinal	/mòːj/	/pà:ː/	/péʔ/	/puːl/	/pɨəŋ/	/tɔːl/	/tel/	/taːm/	/kaːj/	/kal/
Ordinal	ໂມຢ	ປາຣ	ເປະ	ປູລ	ເປືອງ	ຕອລ	ເຕລ	ຕາມ	ກາຍ	ກັລ
Ordinal	1st	2nd	3rd	4th	5th	6th	7th	8th	9th	10th

=== Comparison with Khmer ===
English	Khmu	Khmer
dog	ເສາະ ([sɔ́ɂ])	ឆ្កែ (chhkê)
child	ກອນ ([kɔ́ːn])	កូន (kon)
mother	ມະ ([màɂ])	ម៉ាក់ (măk)
flower	ຣາງ ([ràːŋ])	ផ្កា (phka)
mountain	ມົກ ([mòk])	ភ្នំ (phnum)
to see	ກເລະ ([klèɂ])	ឃើញ (kheunh)
enemy	ສັຕູ ([sa tùː])	សត្រូវ (sâtrov)
to disappear	ງັຕ ([ŋát])	បាត់ (băt)
to shoot	ປິຍ ([píɲ])	បាញ់ (bănh)
seven	ເຈຕັ ([cét])	ប្រាំពីរ (brămpir)
penis	ລົກ ([lòk])	លិង្គ (lĭngk)

== See also ==
- Khmuic languages
- Khmu people
