= Tai Thanh language =

Southwestern Tai language of Vietnam

Tai Thanh
- Tai Man Thanh
- Native to: Vietnam
- Native speakers: 20,000 (2002)
- Language family: Kra–Dai: Tai; Southwestern (Thai); ?; Tai Thanh

Language codes
- ISO 639-3: tmm
- Glottolog: tait1248
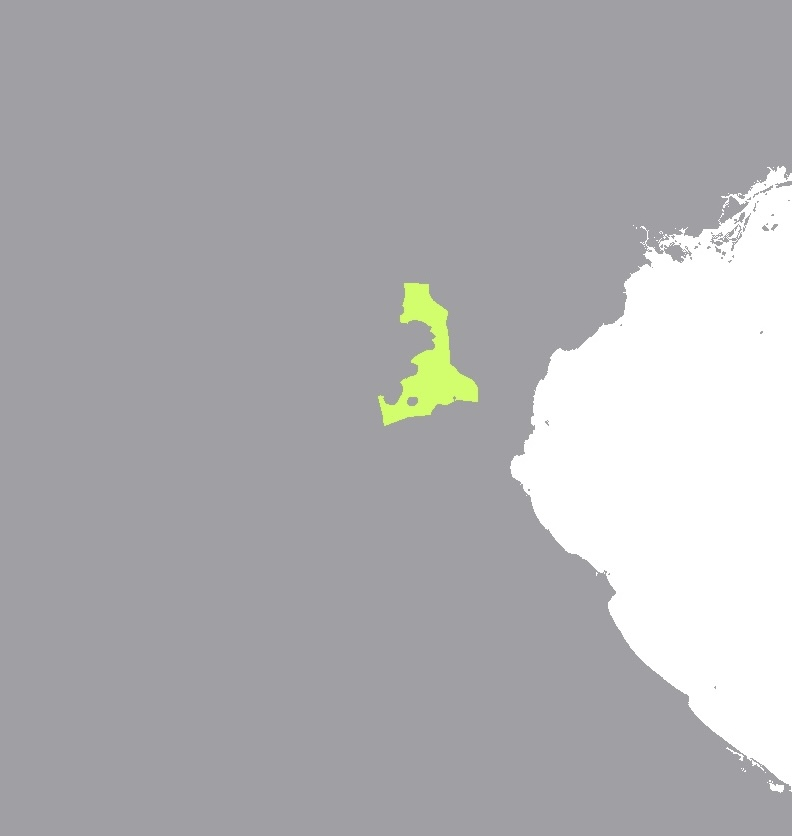

Tai Thanh, or Tai Then, is a Southwestern Tai language of Nghe An Province and Thanh Hoa Province, north-central Vietnam.

Tayten (300 speakers as of 1995) is spoken in the 2 villages of Ban Phia and Ban Tenngiou in Pakxeng District, Luang Prabang Province, Laos. It is either Tai Then or Thin.
