= O Du people =

Ethnic group in Vietnam and Laos

O Du
Total population
- 570 (est.)

Regions with significant populations
- Vietnam 428 (2019); Laos

Languages
- O’du, • Vietnamese • Lao

Religion
- Animism • Christianity

The Ơ Đu (O'du) are an aboriginal ethnic group in Vietnam and Laos. Their total population is more than 570.

== Name variation ==
The Ơ Đu are also commonly referred to as O'Du, O Du, Iduh, Tay Hat, Hat, and Haat.

== Culture ==
The Ơ Đu subsist mainly on slash-and-burn agriculture and raising cattle, augmented by hunting, gathering, and weaving.

== Language ==
The Ơ Đu have a language also called O'du, which is a Khmuic language. The Khmuic languages are Austro-Asiatic. There is some debate as to whether the Khmuic languages are of the Mon–Khmer branch, but the majority opinion is that they are not. Most Ơ Đu presently speak Thai.

== Geographic distribution ==
- Population in Laos: 194 in Xiangkhouang Province
- Population in Vietnam: 301 in Tương Dương district of the Nghệ An Province (North Central Coast region)

== See also ==
- List of ethnic groups in Vietnam
- List of ethnic groups in Laos
