= Ksingmul people =

Ethnic group in Vietnam and Laos

Xinh Mun
Regions with significant populations
- Vietnam 29,503 (2019); Laos

Languages
- Ksingmul (Puoc), Vietnamese • Lao

Religion
- Animism • Buddhism

The Ksingmul (Vietnamese: Xinh Mul), also known as Con Pua, Puộc, and Pụa, are an ethnic group in Vietnam and Laos. In Vietnam, they live primarily in the northwest, in the provinces of Sơn La and Lai Châu. The group numbers approximately 29,503 people and its language is in the Khmuic languages group of the Mon–Khmer language family.

The Ksingmul celebrate several festivals such as Muong A Ma, Ksaisatip, and Mạ Ma.

== Subgroups ==
The Ksingmul are divided linguistically into three subgroups:

- The Kháng of Vietnam
- The Phong-Kniang of Laos
- The Puoc of Vietnam and Laos.

== Language ==
The Ksingmul speak the Ksingmul language, which is a Khmuic language. The Khmuic languages are Austro-Asiatic.

== Geographic distribution ==
- Population in Vietnam: 21,939
- Population in Laos: 3,164
