= Bit people =

Ethnic group in Laos

Bit
Total population
- 2,000

Regions with significant populations
- Laos, China

Languages
- Bit, Lao

Religion
- Animism

The Bit or Bid are an ethnic group living in Laos. There are around 1,500 people left, mainly in a single village, as well as a further 500 or so across the border in China. They speak Bit, a Mon–Khmer language, although most also speak Lao.

The Bit live in houses built on stilts, and cultivate wet rice as well as other vegetables. They believe in local spirits and have a male religious leader known as mo mon.
