= Mal people =

Mal
Total population
- 27,893 (est.)

Regions with significant populations
- Laos, Thailand, United States

Languages
- Mal, Lao, Thai, others

Religion
- Theravada Buddhism

The Mal are an ethnic group native to Laos and Thailand. They are one of two sub-groups of the Lua people (the other one being the Phai).

== Name Variation ==
The Mal are also commonly referred to as Madl, Khatin, T'in, Htin, Thin, and Tin.

== Language ==
The Mal speak a language also called Mal, which is a Khmuic language. The Khmuic languages are Austroasiatic.

== Geographic Distribution ==
- Population in Laos: 23,193 in Xaignabouli Province
- Population in Thailand: 4,700
- Population in United States: Unknown

== See also ==
Mal Indian People
