= Oʼdu language =

Austroasiatic language spoken in Laos and Vietnam

Oʼdu
- Ơ Đu
- Native to: Vietnam, Laos
- Ethnicity: O Du people
- Native speakers: (950 cited 1999 & 2005 censuses)
- Language family: Austroasiatic: Khmuic; Oʼdu

Language codes
- ISO 639-3: tyh
- Glottolog: oduu1239
- ELP: Iduh

Oʼdu (Ơ Đu), or Iduh, is a Mon–Khmer language of Vietnam and Laos. Once spoken by about 300 people in Tương Dương district, Nghệ An province, Vietnam (Đặng, et al. 2010), it is now considered to be almost extinct.
