= Khmu people =

Ethnic group of Southeast Asia

Khmu/ Kơbru
Total population
- c. 800,000

Regions with significant populations
- Burma, China, United States
- Laos: 708,412 (2015)
- Vietnam: 90,612 (2019)
- Thailand: 10,000
- China: 7,000
- United States: 20,000

Languages
- Khmu; Lao Language (in Laos) • Vietnamese language (in Vietnam)

Religion
- Satsana Phi, Theravada Buddhism, Christianity, and others

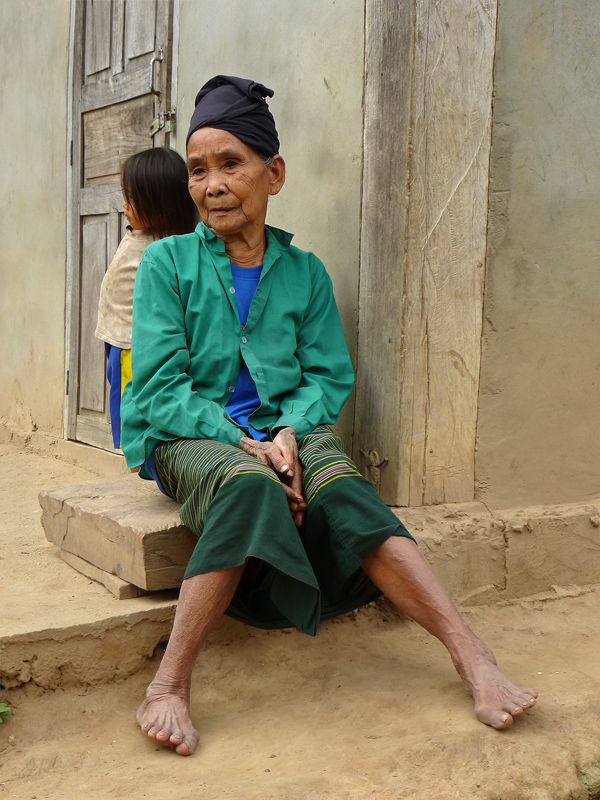
Elderly Khmu woman from Bokeo Province

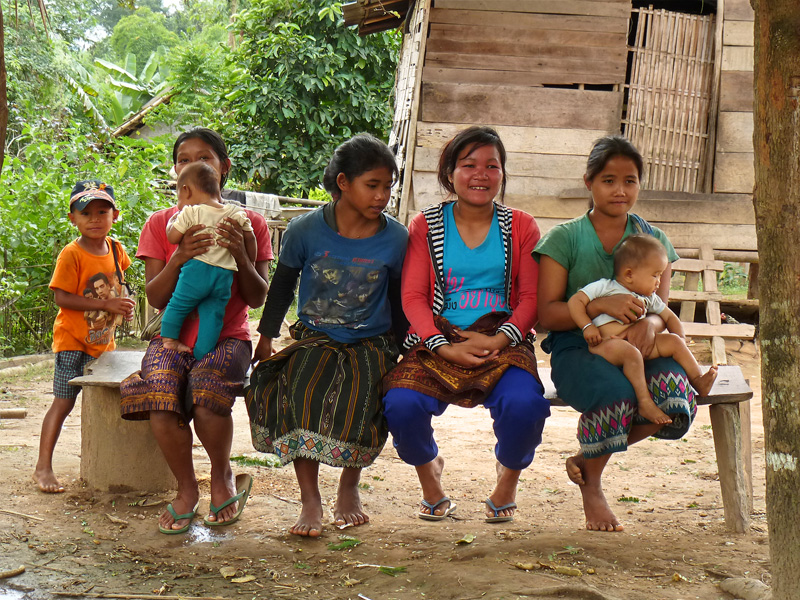
Khmu women and their children from Bokeo Province

The Khmu (/kəˈmuː/; Khmu: /kmm̥uʔ/ or /kmmúʔ/; Lao: ກຶມມຸ [kɯ̀m.mūʔ] or Lao: ຂະມຸ [kʰā.mūʔ]; Thai: ขมุ [kʰā.mùʔ]; Lanna: ขมุ [kʰā.mǔʔ]; Vietnamese: Khơ Mú; Chinese: 克木族; Burmese: ခမူ) are an ethnic group of Southeast Asia. The majority (88%) live in northern Laos where they constitute the largest minority ethnic group, comprising eleven percent of the total population. Alternative historical English spellings include Kmhmu, Kemu, and Kơbru, among others.

The Khmu can also be found in southwest China (in Xishuangbanna in Yunnan province), and in recent centuries have migrated to areas of Burma, Thailand and Vietnam (where they are an officially recognized ethnic group). In the People's Republic of China, however, they are not given official recognition as a separate "ethnic" group, but are rather classified as a subgroup of Bulang.

The endonym "Khmu" is suspected to stem from their word kymhmuʔ meaning "people". Khmu also often refer to their ethnicity as pruʔ.

== Geographic distribution ==
The Khmu were the indigenous inhabitants of northern Laos. It is generally believed the Khmu once inhabited a much larger area. After the influx of Thai/Lao peoples into the lowlands of Southeast Asia, the Khmu were forced to higher ground (Lao Theung), above the rice-growing lowland Lao and below the Hmong/Mien groups (Lao Sung) that inhabit the highest regions, where they practiced swidden agriculture. There are more than 568,000 Khmu around the world, with populations of 500,000 in Laos, 73,000 in Central Highlands of Vietnam, 10,000 in Thailand, 10,000 in China, and an estimated 20,000 in the United States.

The Khmu (Kobru) of Laos reside mainly in the North, ranging across 10 provinces. The Khmu form the largest ethnic group, outnumbering even the Lao, in five Northern provinces (Luang Prabang, Phongsaly, Oudomxay, Bokeo and Luangnamtha Provinces). The Khmu of Thailand are clustered in Nan Province near the Thailand-Laos border.

Most Khmu villages are isolated, and only slowly receiving electricity. In many areas the Khmu live alongside the Hmong and other regional minority ethnic groups. The Khmu in the United States originated as refugees from the Vietnam War. Most of these refugees settled in California, which is home to both the Khmu National Federation, Inc., and the Khmu Catholic National Center.

Many of the Khmu in Thailand have arrived recently from Laos and Vietnam, also as refugees from the Vietnam War and subsequent communist governments, although cross-border migrations into Thailand's Nan, Phayao and Chiang Rai provinces for new farm land and work in the teak industry began as much as 200 years ago.

== Subgroups ==
In their mountain refuges, the various Khmu settlements became isolated, surrounded and partially influenced by the dominant groups of their respective areas. Accordingly, the Khmu now recognize subdivisions among themselves which are differentiated primarily by dialect. These subgroups are called tmowy ([tmɔi]) in Khmu. Some of the larger tmowy are the Tmowy Mea [tmɔi mɛ], Tmowy Ksak [tmɔi ksăk], Tmowy Rok [tmɔi rɔk] (Lao: kha hok). The Khmu north of the Tha River (nam tha), who often live in close contact with the lowland Tai Lü and Thai Yuan peoples, distinguish groups including the Tmowy Lü [tmɔi lɯʔ], Tmowy Yuan and Tmowy Khuen (Khuen is often a synonym for "Khmu" in general).

Aside from their geographical separation, the subgroups' primary differences are in dialect. However, there are slight variations in customs and cultural practices among the various tmowy. The Khmu refer to others within their own tmowy as tay-haem ("older siblings-younger siblings"), expressing solidarity and shared ritual/common ancestral worship while referring to other Khmu by the name of their respective groups.

The Khmu groups north of the Tha River in particular, whose names reflect their partial identification with the Buddhist Tai cultures, have acculturated to the dominant ethnic groups of the region. They are often contrasted with the Khmu Roek who live higher up in the hills and retain some older customs that other groups have abandoned. While the Khmu Roek are often respected as the center of the Khmu "socio-economic ritual complex", "Roek" is also used by more assimilated Khmu as an appellation for "backwood" Khmu regardless of their tmowy.

== Language ==
The Khmu language belongs to the Austro-Asiatic language family, in which several closely related languages including Puoc, O’du and Kniang, among others, are grouped together forming the Khmuic branch. The many dialects of Khmu differ primarily in consonant inventory, existence of register, and the degree to which the language has been influenced by the surrounding national language(s). Dialects are, for the most part, mutually intelligible; however communication can be difficult between speakers of geographically distant dialects.

The dialects of Khmu can be broadly categorized into two groups, Western Khmu and Eastern Khmu. Western Khmu dialects have fewer consonant phonemes and instead use phonemic register contrast of "lax" breathy register and "tense" modal register. In at least one dialect of Western Khmu, Khmu Roek, tonogenesis is evident as the register contrast has developed into a system of two phonemic tones with six phonetic realizations. Eastern Khmu dialects show the opposite tendency. Completely lacking either register or tone distinction, these dialects utilize a three-way distinction of stops (voiced, voiceless and aspirated voiceless) and nasals (voiced, voiceless, and pre-glottalized) in the syllable-initial position for phonemic contrast.

Although Khmu language use among peers is currently fairly vigorous, most, if not all, Khmu are also fluent in the language of the culturally dominant group of the area and many regularly use three or even four different languages. The Khmu of Laos, for example, speak Lao when dealing with government officials, engaging in commerce with the lowland Lao, or if attending school. Trade with other highland groups may necessitate knowledge of additional languages, such as Hmong, unless Lao can be used a lingua franca by both groups. The Khmu of Thailand are more assimilated, often living in villages among the Thai and preferring to speak Kham Meuang even at home in households with two Khmu parents.

== Origin ==
Khmuic peoples refers to a group of ethnicities of mainland Southeast Asia that speak closely related languages and follow similar customs and traditions. It is believed, based on linguistic, cultural and historical evidence, that these now-disparate groups are descended from a homogeneous ethnicity that may have been among the first populations to settle northern Indochina. This historical Khmuic people inhabited areas far larger than at present, including northern lowland areas of at least present day Thailand and Laos, until absorbed or pushed into mountainous refuges by successive Mon and Khmer empires and the later arrival of various Tai peoples.

== Social structure ==
The Khmu are an agricultural society, although gathering, hunting, trapping and fishing are parts of the Khmu lifestyle. Khmu crops include rice (especially white and black sticky rice), corn, bananas, sugar cane, cucumbers, beans, sesame and a variety of vegetables. Most of the agricultural work in Khmu villages is done communally, so as to combine the strength and finish the work quickly. Harvesting of rice from the swidden field is generally performed by the village women.

Rice is stored outside the village to protect from fire, and in elevated structures to protect from mice and rats. Khmu elders are traditionally the most important people of the village, and are responsible for resolving all village disputes.

Village leaders included the shaman (knowledgeable in spiritual medicine), the medicine man (knowledgeable in herbal medicine), the priest (based on family lineage of priesthood), and the village headman (in modern times chosen by the Laotian government). Laotian Khmu communities generally have localized justice systems administered by the village elders.

== Culture ==
Khmu culture is traditionally passed down by the recital of stories around evening fires. The story-telling sessions involve the sharing of silver pipes (originally opium, but now predominantly tobacco). Some Khmu are heavily tattooed for both decorative and religious reasons. In Laos, Khmu are reputed for practicing magic, and some families still engage in the casting of spells and telling of fortunes. According to the animistic practices of the Khmu, reverence is offered to the house spirit Hroi gang.

Villagers believe that a Khmu house, village, and its surroundings are integrated with the spirits of the land, and so houses and villages are considered holy or ritualized spaces. Typically, entire Khmu villages are enclosed in fences with three or four gates which separate the Khmu from their granaries and barns. Altars are placed outside the perimeter to ward off fires and storms.

In the past, each Khmu family was believed to be under the protection of a totem such as a boar or an eagle who had originally helped an ancestor and would continue to protect the family. In the past Khmuic people celebrated 4 festivals namely: rice planting, rice harvesting, new year, and wash or get rid of sin festivals. In ancient time Khmuic people celebrated new year festival on the first waxing moon day of the first lunar month. At present day the new year festival is mostly not practiced or if it is, it is integrated with the harvesting festival.

An ancient Khmuic house must be laid long along the direction from east to west and never intersected the direction of the sun. However, there are Khmuic who people built their houses intersecting the sun direction. Each house must have a door in the east and another one facing to the north or south. This depends on the situation of the area where the house was built and never build a door in the west side of the house. A house with straight leans must have a large outside balcony (attached with a 5 or 7 step stair) connected from the east door and a lean room with east or north door (attached with a 5 or 7 step stair).

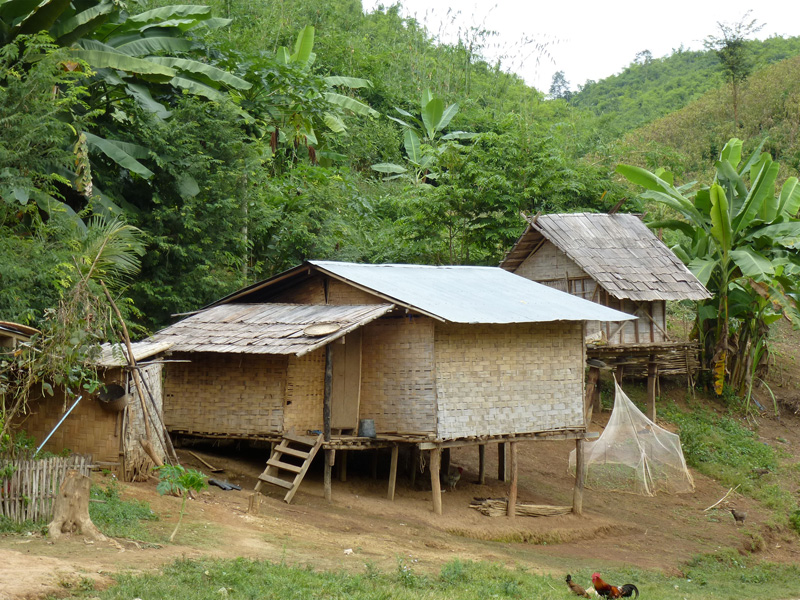
Traditional house of the Khmu people

A house with bent leans (half moon shape) must have a large outside balcony (attached with a large 5 or 7 step stair) connected from a small and short lean room connected from the north or south site of the house, and an inside balcony (attached with a 5- or 7-step stair) connected from the east door. Ancient Khmuic people believed and worshiped the sun spirit for safety and health. In the early morning whichever day the sky is clear, when the sun is starting to rise, Khmuic people opened the east doors of their houses to let the sun shine into their houses.

There are three explanations for this directionality of house construction: 1. to expel devils, ghosts and bad spirits out of the houses (ancient Khmuic people believed that devils, ghosts or bad spirits fear sunlight); 2. to expel and wash out bacteria and any kinds of small insects dangerous to body and health; 3. Khmuic people also believe that the early morning sunlight is pure and fresh, so exposing one's own body to the early morning sunlight makes one's own mind fresh, good tempered, healthy and active at work. Nowadays, most Khmuic people ignore the beliefs and rules, and don't practice this way of building their houses. Roofs of houses are covered with wooden tiles or thatch.

In cases relating to the harvesting season, Khmuic people also respect the sun as a symbol of clear sky or rain-less weather. During the harvesting season, sometimes the weather was abnormal and it rained, which caused a lot of damage to rice. So, when the rice ripens and its color becomes yellow or orange, and about the time of harvesting, Khmuic people held small rituals to sacrifice rice souls or spirits on the rice fields, mostly are up land rice fields or swidden fields (slash and burn technique which Khmuic people call “hre hngo” [hre̞ʔ hŋɒ̞ʔ]). In the rituals of rice soul sacrifices they hit bronze drum, which Khmuic people call "yan" (bronze drum) or "heurbang greh" (harvest gong) to beg the sun to shine well and prevent rain from falling down. In case it rains, they also hit yan and say some sayings to beg for the rain to stop. During the rainy season if it rains more than usual, Khmuic people also hit yan, and recite sayings to beg for rain to ease or stop for a little while. This is why in the 'Moun Greh ceremony, Khmuic people hit the yan (bronze drum) to thank the sun for shining well during the rice harvesting; and that is why Khmuic people also call bronze drum as “heurbang greh” (harvest gong); in the present day this kind of practice is rare.

Khmu cemeteries are traditionally divided into four sections; one for natural deaths, one for accidental deaths, one for children, and one for those who died away from home. The Khmu do not generally believe in rebirth. Traditional Khmu animism puts emphasis on the concept of taboo, as villagers believe that violations of taboo result in vengeance of spirits. Forbidden activities include touching the altars or the amulets representing the house's spirit, birth ceremonies for children born feet-first, and entering a house without permission.

Dances to propitiate the rice goddess are common among the Khmu people; they are performed in order to ensure a good harvest.

== See also ==
- Hmong
- Nyaw people
