= Lamet people =

Lamet
Total population
- 22,383 (Laos 2015)

Regions with significant populations
- Laos, Thailand

Languages
- Lamet, Lao, Thai

Religion
- Animism, Buddhism

The Lamet people are an ethnic group in Thailand and Laos.

== Name Variations ==
Lamet are also often referred to as:

- Lamed
- Khamet
- Khamed

== Geographic distribution ==
There are approximately 22,000 Lamet in the Louang Namtha Province, Oudomxai and Bokeo Provinces of Laos. There are also approximately 100 Lamet in Thailand in the Chiang Rai and Lampang Provinces. There are also 90 Lamet in the United States and 30 in France. In Laos, the Lamet are a hill tribe.

== Origin ==
The Lamet claim to be an indigenous population of northwestern Laos. They are a Palaungic ethnic group.

== Language ==
The Lamet speak an Austroasiatic language related to Palaung and Wa. Most adult males also speak Tai Yuan.

== Economy ==
The Lamet practice slash-and-burn agriculture, as well as hunting, gathering and fishing. The Lamet trade with the Lao and Thai to obtain their necessaries. Some Lamet also work for wages.

Wealth is considered an important characteristic among male Lamet. For the Lamet, wealth is measured by one's inventory of buffalo, chimes, and bronze drums.

== Religions ==
- Animism

== Marriage customs ==
After marriage, the newly married Lamet man moves into his wife's family home and works for her father. He then begins to make marriage payments up to a fixed amount, after which the couple either moves in with the husband's parents or the couple makes a new household.
