= Ksingmul language =

Austroasiatic language spoken in Laos and Vietnam

Ksingmul
- Puoc
- Xinh Mun
- Native to: Vietnam, Laos
- Ethnicity: Ksingmul people
- Native speakers: (27,000 cited 1999 & 2005 censuses)
- Language family: Austroasiatic: Khmuic; Ksingmul

Language codes
- ISO 639-3: puo
- Glottolog: puoc1238

Ksingmul (Ksing Mul, Puoc, Vietnamese: Xinh Mun, Chinese: 欣门语) is a Mon–Khmer language spoken by the Ksingmul people of Vietnam and Laos.

== Varieties ==
Jerold Edmondson (2010: 144), citing Đặng Nghiêm Vạn, et al. (1972: 254 ff.), lists 3 major varieties of Ksingmul. Ksingmul Nghệt is the most conservative variety.

- Ksingmul Nghệt: Nà Nghệt Village, Xiêng Khọ District, Sầm Nưa Province (Houaphan Province), Laos
- Ksingmul Dạ: Chiềng On Village, Yên Châu District, Sơn La Province, Vietnam
- Ksingmul Đồng

== Phonology ==
Ksingmul Consonants
		Labial	Alveolar	Palatal	Velar	Glottal
Nasal		m	n	ɲ	ŋ	
Stop	plain	p	t	c	k	ʔ
Stop	aspirated	pʰ	tʰ		kʰ	
Stop	voiced	b	d		g	
Fricative	plain		s			h
Fricative	voiced		zʲ			
Approximant		w	l			

Ksingmul Vowels
	Front	Central	Back
Close	i	ɨ	u
Diphthong	iə	ɨə	uə
Mid		ə	o
Open-mid	ɛ		ɔː
Open		ä	

All monophthongs can be long or short, apart from /ɔː/ which can only be long.
