= Prai language =

Austroasiatic language spoken in Thailand and Laos

Prai
- Phai
- Thin
- Native to: Thailand, Laos
- Ethnicity: Phai people
- Native speakers: 40,000 (2001)
- Language family: Austroasiatic: Khmuic; Mal–Phrai; Prai

Language codes
- ISO 639-3: prt
- Glottolog: phai1238
- ELP: Prai

Prai (Phray) or Phai, also known as Thin (Htin), is a Mon–Khmer language of Thailand and Laos. There are several closely related, but not mutually intelligible dialects which go by the names Prai and Thin. They are also closely related to Mal, together forming the Mal–Phrai group of languages, sometimes collectively called Lua' language (because they are spoken by the Lua people).

== Phonology ==
Prai Consonants
		Labial	Alveolar	Palatal	Velar	Glottal
Nasal		m	n	ɲ	ŋ	
Stop	plain	p	t	c	k	ʔ
Stop	implosive	ɓ	ɗ			
Fricative				ç		h
Approximant		w	l	j		
Trill			r			

Prai Vowels
	Front	Central	Back	
	Front	Central	Unrounded	Rounded
Close	i		ɯ	u
Mid	e	ə		o
Open-mid				ɔ
Open	æ	a		

All vowels can be long or short.
