= Mlabri people =

Mlabri
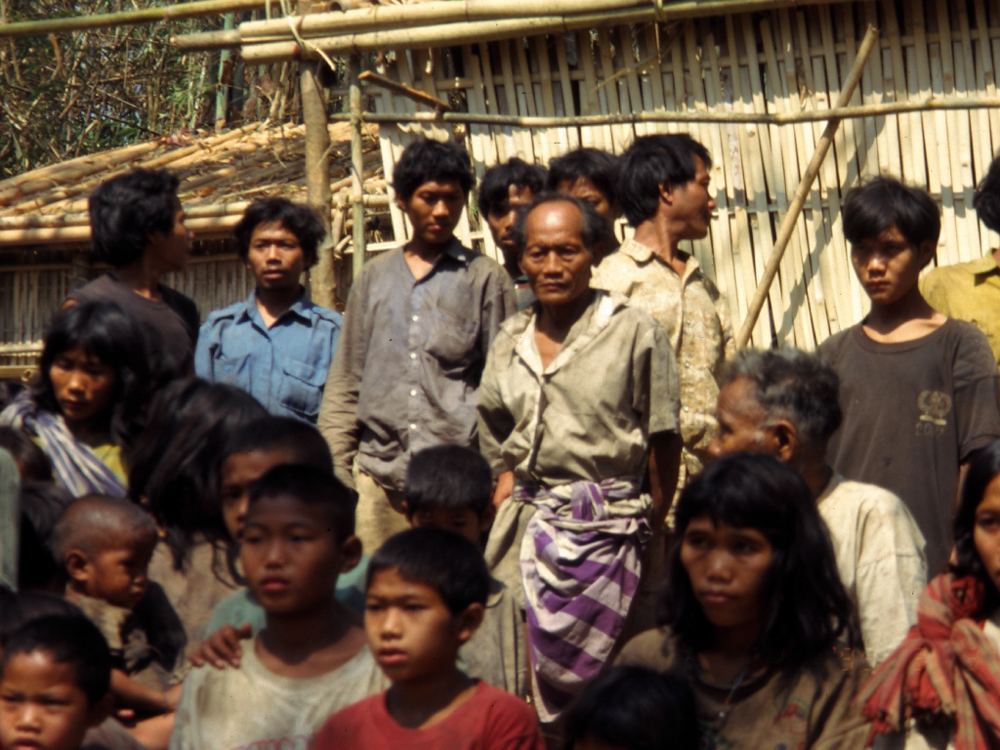

Total population
- ~400 (est.)

Regions with significant populations
- Laos, Thailand

Languages
- Mlabri, others

Religion
- Christianity, Animism

The Mlabri (Thai:มลาบรี) or Mrabri, also called the Phi Tong Luang, are an ethnic group of Thailand and Laos, and have been called "the most interesting and least understood people in Southeast Asia". Only about 400 or fewer Mlabris remain in the world today, with some estimates as low as 100. A hill tribe in northern Thailand along the border with Laos, they have been groups of nomadic hunter-gatherers. Those in Thailand live close to the Hmong and northern Thai. Those living in Laos live close to other ethnic groups.

== Nomenclature ==
The name Mlabri is a Thai/Lao alteration of the word Mrabri, which appears to come from a Khmuic term "people of the forest". In Khmu, mra means "person" and bri "forest". They are also known locally as Phi Tong Leuang (Thai: ผีตองเหลือง, Lao: ຜີຕອງເຫລືອງ) or "spirits of the yellow leaves", since they abandon their shelters when the leaves begin to turn yellow.

== Genetics ==
Genetic analysis of the Mlabri group by Hiroki Oota and colleagues led them to believe that their mtDNA has little diversity, suggesting the Mlabris originated 500 to 800 years ago from very few individuals. However, this was contested in the journal PLoS Biology in 2005 in an exchange of articles between Hiroki Oota and his colleagues and Tony Waters.

== Lifestyle ==
The Mlabri traditionally lived a nomadic lifestyle. They moved frequently, and had no permanent houses, instead making temporary shelters from palm leaves and bamboo-string. They wore only a loin-covering of bark or cloth, though most Mlabri now wear factory-made clothes gained by trade with other hill tribes. They are hunter-gatherers, with most of their food coming from gathering. Women give birth alone in the forest, and infant mortality used to be very high.

The Mlabri have few regimented social ceremonies, and are said to have no formal religious system, though they believe in forest spirits and other nature spirit. Marriages are made with simple request; there is no bride-price. The dead are buried near where they expired, and the tribe moves on.

In 1938, Austrian anthropologist Hugo Bernatzik published an ethnography of the "Yellow Leaf People" which contained his brief observations of the tribe in the early 20th century.

Since the 1990s, the Mlabri in Thailand have settled into more permanent villages in Phrae and Nan provinces. The Thai government has declared the forest areas where they used to live to be state-owned forest reserves and discourages any Mlabri from returning there. The houses in the permanent villages that the Mlabri now live in are made of cinderblock and wood, with metal roofs and even electricity. Mlabri children have started going to public schools, and their health care has improved. It was reported in 2013 that the Mlabri's suicide rate has risen. Mlabri villages have some economic activity. While still hunting and gathering, the Mlabri now engage in highland farming and hammock weaving, besides working as day laborers.

One of the Mlabri settlements in Nan Province is under the patronage of Princess Sirindhorn.

== Bibliography ==
- Bernatzik, Hugo, The Spirits of the Yellow Leaves Leipzig 1938; London: R. Hale. Translated by E. W. Dickson. 1958.
- Long, Eugene, Mary Long, and Tony Waters. The Demography of a Settled Hunter Gatherer Group in Thailand." Journal of the SIam Society (v.105) 2017.
- Long, Mary, Eugene Long, and Tony Waters. "Suicide Among the Mla Bri Hunter-Gatherers of Northern Thailand." Journal of the Siam Society (v. 101) 2013.
- Nimonjiya, Shu, "From Ghosts to Hill Tribe to Thai Citizens: Towards a History of the Mlabri of Northern Thailand." Aseanie 32: 155–176, 2013.
- Oota, Hiroki and others, "Recent Origin and Cultural Reversion of a Hunter-Gatherer Group", PLOS Biology, 2005 March, volume 3, number 3.
- Rischel, Jurgen. Mlabri and Mon-Khmer: Tracking the history of a hunter-gatherer language. The Royal Danish Society of Sciences and Letters 2007.
- Schliesinger, Joachim, Ethnic Groups of Laos, vol. 2, White Lotus 2000, pp. 187–197
- Siam Society. "The Mlabri" Special issue of The Journal of the Siam Society Vol 51 (2) 1963.
- Waters, Tony, "Comment on 'Recent Origin and Cultural Reversion of a Hunter-Gatherer Group," PLoS Biology 2005 August, volume 3, number 8.
- Trier, Jesper Invoking the Spirits - fieldwork on the material and spiritual life of the Mlabri, pp. 325, 2008 July ISBN 978-87-88415-47-6
