= Prai people =

Phai
Total population
- 51,000

Regions with significant populations
- Laos, Thailand

Languages
- Phai; Lao and/or Thai as second languages

Religion
- Animism, Theravada Buddhism

Related ethnic groups
- Mal

The Phai are an ethnic group in Thailand and Laos. They are one of two sub-groups of the Lua people (the other one being the Mal).

== Name Variation ==
The Phai are also commonly referred to as Prai, Phay, Thung Chan Pray, Kha Phay, and Pray. In Laos they are also referred to as Htin.

== Language ==
The Phai speak a language also called Phai, which belongs to the Khmuic branch of Austroasiatic languages There are several dialects called Phai, that are sometimes hardly mutually intelligible.

== Geographic Distribution ==
- Population in Laos: 15,000 in Phongsali and Xaignabouli Provinces

There are also dozens of Prai villages in Thailand.
