= Kniang language =

Austroasiatic language spoken in Laos

Phong
- Kniang
- Native to: Laos
- Region: Southern Houaphanh Province
- Native speakers: 30,700 (2018)
- Language family: Austroasiatic: Khmuic; Xinh Mul?; Phong

Language codes
- ISO 639-3: pnx
- Glottolog: phon1246
- ELP: Phong-Kniang

Phong, also known as Kha Phong and Kniang, is an Austroasiatic language of the Mon–Khmer family, spoken in Laos. Its nearest relatives are the fellow Xinh Mul tongues, the Khang language and Puoc language, both spoken in Vietnam. The number of speakers of Phong-Kniang is estimated at 30,700.

Phong Kaneng [pʰɔːŋ kᵊneːŋ] and Phong Kniang are dialects. Phong is spoken in northeastern Laos, such as in Hua Muong, Sam Neua Province.

== Names ==
In colonial French sources, it has also been referred to as Kha Phong, Pou Kanieng, and K’nieng.
