= Khmuic languages =

Subgroup of the Austroasiatic language family

Khmuic
- Geographic distribution: Indochina
- Linguistic classification: Austroasiatic: Khmuic
- Proto-language: Proto-Khmuic

Language codes
- Glottolog: khmu1236

The Khmuic languages /kəˈmuːɪk/ are a branch of the Austroasiatic languages spoken mostly in northern Laos, as well as in neighboring northern Vietnam and southern Yunnan, China. Khmu is the only widely spoken language in the group.

== Homeland ==
Paul Sidwell (2015) suggests that the Khmuic Urheimat (homeland) was in what is now Phongsali province, northern Laos.

== Languages ==
The Khmuic languages are:

- Mlabri (Yumbri)
- Kniang (Phong 3, Tay Phong)
- Ksingmul (Puok, Pou Hok, Khsing-Mul)
- Khmu’
- Khuen
- O’du
- Prai
- Mal (Thin)
- Theen (Kha Sam Liam)

Similarly, Phuoc (Xinh Mul) and Kháng are also sometimes classified as Mangic, and Kháng is classified as Palaungic by Diffloth.

Bumang, formerly classified as Khmuic, is classified as a Palaungic language by Paul Sidwell. Jerold A. Edmondson considers it to be most closely related to Kháng. Also, Quang Lam is a poorly attested language in Vietnam that is closely related to Kháng or Bit. (See Bit–Khang languages)

Khmuic language history and diversity are currently being researched by Nathaniel Hiroz.

== Classification ==
The interrelationships of these languages are uncertain. Ethnologue 19 classifies them as follows:

- Khmuic
  - Khao: Khao, Bit
  - Mlabri: Mlabri
  - Xinh Mul: Khang, Phong-Kniang, Puoc
  - Mal–Khmu’
    - Khmu’, Khuen, O’du
    - Mal–Phrai: Lua’, Mal, Prai

A provisional classification at SEALang keeps Mal–Phrai, but connects Khao with Khang instead of with Bit, treats Khuen as a dialect of Khmu':

- Khmuic
  - Bit
  - Khao–Khang: Khao, Khang
  - Mlabri
  - Phong
  - Puoc
  - Khmu’
  - O’du
  - Mal–Phrai: Lua’, Mal, Phray, Phai

=== Diffloth & Proschan (1989) ===
Chazée (1999), citing Diffloth & Proschan (1989), has the following:

- Khmuic
  - (Khang?)
  - Khmu
  - Phray–Pram
    - Mlabri
    - Phay / Mal / T'in
      - Ksing Moul (Ksongmul)
      - Pramic
        - Tai Hat (Iduh)
        - Tai Then
        - Phong Laan, Phong Phène, Phong Tapouang
        - Kaniang, Phong Piat (Phong Saloey)

However, Gérard Diffloth now considers Pramic (i.e., all Khmuic languages except for Khmu) to be a separate Austroasiatic branch that has come under heavy influence from Khmu.

=== Peiros (2004) ===
Ilia Peiros (Peiros 2004:39) gives the following classification:

- Khmuic
    - Khang
    - Bit
    - Mlabri–Pray
      - Mlabri
      - Pray
      - Kmu
        - Kxinh Mul
        - Ksinmul
        - Phong-Kniang
        - Iduh

=== Sidwell (2014) ===
Based on developments of Proto-Khmuic *aː₁, Paul Sidwell (2014) classifies the Khmuic languages as follows.

- Khmuic
  - Khmu
  - Mlabri-Pram
    - Mlabri
    - Phay-Pram
      - Phay/Mal/T'in
      - Khsing Mul
      - Pramic
        - Tai Hat
        - Phong Laan, Phong Phène, Phong Tapouang
        - Kniang, Phong Piat (Phong Saloey)
        - Tayten

The developments of Proto-Khmuic *aː₁ according to Sidwell (2014) are:

- Proto-Khmuic: *aː₁
  - Khmu: *aː
  - Proto-Mlabri-Pram: *ɛː
    - Proto-Pray-Pram: *iə
      - Proto-Pramic *iː

== See also ==
- Khmu language
- Khmu people
