= New Tai Lue alphabet =

Alphabet for the Tai Lue language

New Tai Lue ᦟᦲᧅᦷᦎᦺᦑᦟᦹᧉ Xishuangbanna Dai
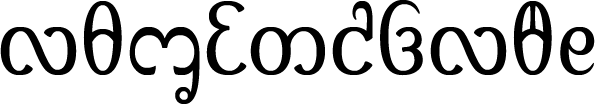
- Script type: Abugida
- Period: c. 1950–present
- Direction: Left-to-right
- Languages: Tai Lue

Related scripts
- Parent systems: Egyptian hieroglyphs: Phoenician; Aramaic; Brahmi; Tamil-Brahmi; Kadamba or Pallava alphabet; Old Mon; Tai Tham; New Tai Lue

ISO 15924
- ISO 15924: Talu (354), New Tai Lue

Unicode
- Unicode alias: New Tai Lue
- Unicode range: U+1980–U+19DF

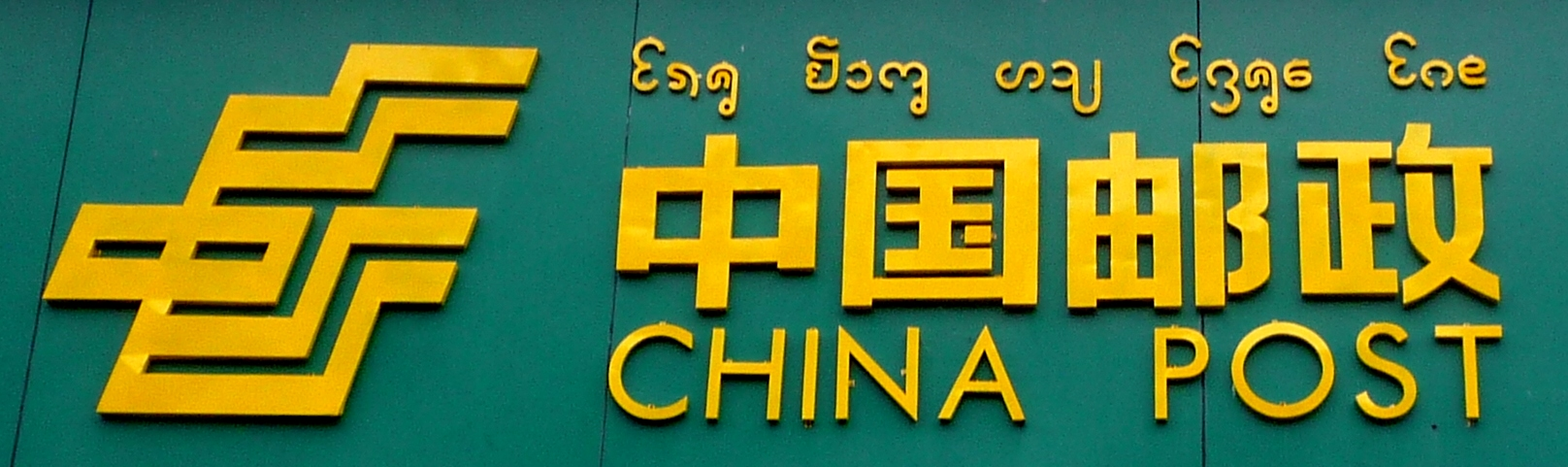
China Post logo with New Tai Lü script reading hoŋ⁴ faːk¹ haːi¹ tsoŋ⁵ ko⁶ in Mohan, Yunnan

New Tai Lue script, also known as Xishuangbanna Dai and Simplified Tai Lue (Tai Lue: ᦟᦲᧅᦷᦎᦺᦑᦟᦹᧉ), is an abugida used to write the Tai Lue language. Developed in China in the 1950s, New Tai Lue is based on the traditional Tai Tham alphabet developed c. 1200. The government of China promoted the alphabet for use as a replacement for the older script; teaching the script was not mandatory, however, and as a result many are illiterate in New Tai Lue. In addition, communities in Burma, Laos, Thailand and Vietnam still use the Tai Tham alphabet.

== Consonants ==
=== Initials ===
Similar to the Thai and Lao scripts, consonants come in pairs to denote two tonal registers (high and low).

High	ᦀ	ᦂ	ᦃ	ᦄ	ᦈ	ᦉ	ᦊ	ᦎ	ᦏ	ᦐ	ᦔ
Low	ᦁ	ᦅ	ᦆ	ᦇ	ᦋ	ᦌ	ᦍ	ᦑ	ᦒ	ᦓ	ᦗ
IPA	/ʔa/	/ka/	/xa/	/ŋa/	/t͡sa/	/sa/	/ja/	/ta/	/tʰa/	/na/	/pa/
High	ᦕ	ᦖ	ᦚ	ᦛ	ᦜ	ᦡ	ᦢ	ᦠ	ᦦ	ᦧ	ᦪ
Low	ᦘ	ᦙ	ᦝ	ᦞ	ᦟ	ᦤ	ᦥ	ᦣ	ᦨ	ᦩ	ᦫ
IPA	/pʰa/	/ma/	/fa/	/va/	/la/	/da/	/ba/	/ha/	/kʷa/	/xʷa/	/sʷa/

=== Finals ===
Final consonants do not have an inherent /a/ vowel. They are modified forms of initials with a virama-like hook:

Final	ᧅ	ᧆ	ᧇ	ᧂ	ᧃ	ᧄ	ᧁ	no final with ᦰ
IPA	/k̚/	/t̚/	/p̚/	/ŋ/	/n/	/m/	/w/	/ʔ/

== Vowels ==
Consonants have a default vowel of /a/. In the table below, '◌' represents a consonant and is used to indicate the position of the various vowels:

Short vowels		Long vowels		Diphthongs with i	
Letters	IPA	Letters	IPA	Letters	IPA
not present	/a/			ᦺ◌	/aj/
◌ᦰ	/aʔ/	◌ᦱ	/aː/	◌ᦻ	/aːj/
◌ᦲᦰ	/iʔ/	◌ᦲ	/i(ː)/		
ᦵ◌ᦰ	/eʔ/	ᦵ◌	/e(ː)/		
ᦶ◌ᦰ	/ɛʔ/	ᦶ◌	/ɛ(ː)/		
◌ᦳ	/u(ʔ)/	◌ᦴ	/uː/	◌ᦼ	/uj/
ᦷ◌ᦰ	/oʔ/	ᦷ◌	/o(ː)/	◌ᦽ	/oj/
◌ᦸᦰ	/ɔʔ/	◌ᦸ	/ɔ(ː)/	◌ᦾ	/ɔj/
◌ᦹᦰ	/ɯʔ/	◌ᦹ	/ɯ(ː)/	◌ᦿ	/ɯj/
ᦵ◌ᦲᦰ	/ɤʔ/	ᦵ◌ᦲ	/ɤ(ː)/	ᦵ◌ᧀ	/ɤj/

In some words, the symbol ᦰ is just used for distinguishing homonyms or displaying onomatopoeiae.

Generally, vowels in open syllables (without final) become long whereas ones in closed syllables become short (except /aː/ and /uː/).

== Tones ==
New Tai Lue has two tone marks which are written at the end of a syllable: ᧈ and ᧉ. Because consonants come in pairs to denote two tonal registers, the two tone marks allow for representation of six specific tones:

	High register			Low register		
Mark		ᧉ	ᧈ		ᧉ	ᧈ
Shown with k	ᦂ	ᦂᧉ	ᦂᧈ	ᦅ	ᦅᧉ	ᦅᧈ
IPA	/ka˥/	/ka˩˧/	/ka˧˥/	/ka˥˩/	/ka˩/	/ka˧/
Transcription	ka¹	ka³	ka⁵	ka²	ka⁴	ka⁶

== Abbreviations ==
Two letters are used only for abbreviations:

- Syllable ᦶᦟᦰ (/lɛʔ˧/, "and", "or") can be abbreviated as the character ᧞
- Syllable ᦶᦟᧁᧉ (/lɛu˩/, "already") can be abbreviated as the character ᧟

== Digits ==
New Tai Lue has its own set of digits:

0	1	2	3	4	5	6	7	8	9
᧐	᧑/᧚	᧒	᧓	᧔	᧕	᧖	᧗	᧘	᧙

An alternative glyph for one (᧚) is used when ᧑ might be confused with the vowel ᦱ.

== Unicode ==
New Tai Lue script was added to the Unicode Standard in March, 2005 with the release of version 4.1.

In June 2015, New Tai Lue was changed from an ISCII-style logical ordering (where vowel modifiers are always encoded after the base consonants which they modify), as used for most Indic scripts in Unicode, to a TIS-620-style visual ordering model (where a vowel modifier will be encoded before the base consonant if it appears before it in the line, or after it otherwise), as used for the Thai and Lao scripts. This change was made since visual ordering for New Tai Lue was found to be more widespread in practice than the previously prescribed logical ordering. This change affected the four vowel letters which appear to the left of the initial consonant.

The Unicode block for New Tai Lue is U+1980–U+19DF:

New Tai Lue^{[1]}^{[2]} Official Unicode Consortium code chart (PDF)
	0	1	2	3	4	5	6	7	8	9	A	B	C	D	E	F
U+198x	ᦀ	ᦁ	ᦂ	ᦃ	ᦄ	ᦅ	ᦆ	ᦇ	ᦈ	ᦉ	ᦊ	ᦋ	ᦌ	ᦍ	ᦎ	ᦏ
U+199x	ᦐ	ᦑ	ᦒ	ᦓ	ᦔ	ᦕ	ᦖ	ᦗ	ᦘ	ᦙ	ᦚ	ᦛ	ᦜ	ᦝ	ᦞ	ᦟ
U+19Ax	ᦠ	ᦡ	ᦢ	ᦣ	ᦤ	ᦥ	ᦦ	ᦧ	ᦨ	ᦩ	ᦪ	ᦫ				
U+19Bx	ᦰ	ᦱ	ᦲ	ᦳ	ᦴ	ᦵ	ᦶ	ᦷ	ᦸ	ᦹ	ᦺ	ᦻ	ᦼ	ᦽ	ᦾ	ᦿ
U+19Cx	ᧀ	ᧁ	ᧂ	ᧃ	ᧄ	ᧅ	ᧆ	ᧇ	ᧈ	ᧉ						
U+19Dx	᧐	᧑	᧒	᧓	᧔	᧕	᧖	᧗	᧘	᧙	᧚				᧞	᧟
Notes 1.As of Unicode version 17.0 2.Grey areas indicate non-assigned code points

== See also ==
- Tai Tham script
- Tai Le script
