= Tai Tham script =

Abugida script

Tai Tham ᨲ᩠ᩅᩫᨵᩢᨾ᩠ᨾ᩼, Tua Tham
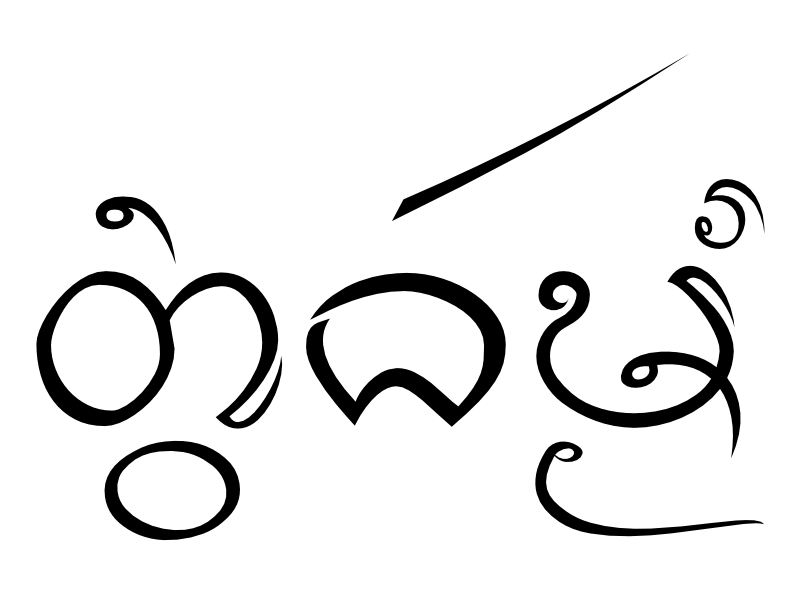
- Script type: Abugida
- Period: c. 1300–present
- Direction: Left-to-right
- Languages: Lanna, Tai Lü, Khün, Isan and Lao

Related scripts
- Parent systems: Egyptian hieroglyphs: Phoenician; Aramaic; Brahmi; Tamil-Brahmi; Pallava; Old Mon; Tai Tham
- Child systems: New Tai Lue, Tham Lao

ISO 15924
- ISO 15924: Lana (351), Tai Tham (Lanna)

Unicode
- Unicode alias: Tai Tham
- Unicode range: U+1A20–U+1AAF

Tai Tham script (Tham meaning "scripture") is an abugida writing system used mainly for a group of Southwestern Tai languages i.e., Lanna, Tai Lü, Khün and Lao; as well as the liturgical languages of Buddhism i.e., Pali and Sanskrit. It is historically known as Tua Tham (ᨲ᩠ᩅᩫᨵᨾ᩠ᨾ᩼ or ᨲ᩠ᩅᩫᨵᩢᨾ᩠ᨾ᩼). In Thailand and Myanmar, the script is often referred to as Lanna script (Thai: อักษรธรรมล้านนา RTGS: Akson Tham Lanna; Burmese: လန်နာအက္ခရာ, MLCTS: Lanna Akhkara) in relation to the historical Lanna Kingdom situating in the Northern region of modern-day Thailand and Kengtung, Shan state in Myanmar. Local people in Northern Thailand also call the script as Tua Mueang (ᨲ᩠ᩅᩫᨾᩮᩥᩬᨦ, Northern Thai pronunciation: [tǔa̯.mɯ̄a̯ŋ]) in parallel to Kam Mueang, a local name for Lanna language. In Laos and Isan region of Thailand, a variation of Tai Tham script, often dubbed Lao Tham, is also known by the locals as To Tham Lao (Northeastern Thai: โตธรรมลาว /toː˩.tʰam˧˥.laːw˧/, cf. Lao: ໂຕທຳ/ໂຕທັມ BGN/PCGN to tham) or Yuan script. Tai Tham script is traditionally written on a dried palm leaf as a palm-leaf manuscript.

The Lanna language is a close relative of (standard) Thai. It is spoken by nearly 6 million people in Northern Thailand and several thousand in Laos of whom few are literate in Lanna script. The script is still read by older monks. Northern Thai has six linguistic tones and Thai only five, making transcription into the Thai script problematic. There is some resurgent interest in the script among younger people, but an added complication is that the modern spoken form, called Kam Muang, differs in pronunciation from the older form.

There are 670,000 speakers of Tai Lü, some of those born before 1950 are literate in Tham, also known as Old Tai Lue. The script has also continued to be taught in the monasteries. The New Tai Lue script is derived from Tham. There are 120,000 speakers of Khün for which Lanna is the only script.

== History ==
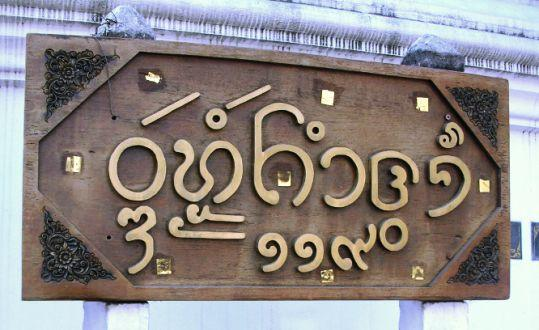
Nameboard of a Buddhist temple in Chiang Mai written in Tai Tham script: Wat Mo kham tuang (and street number 119 in Thai)

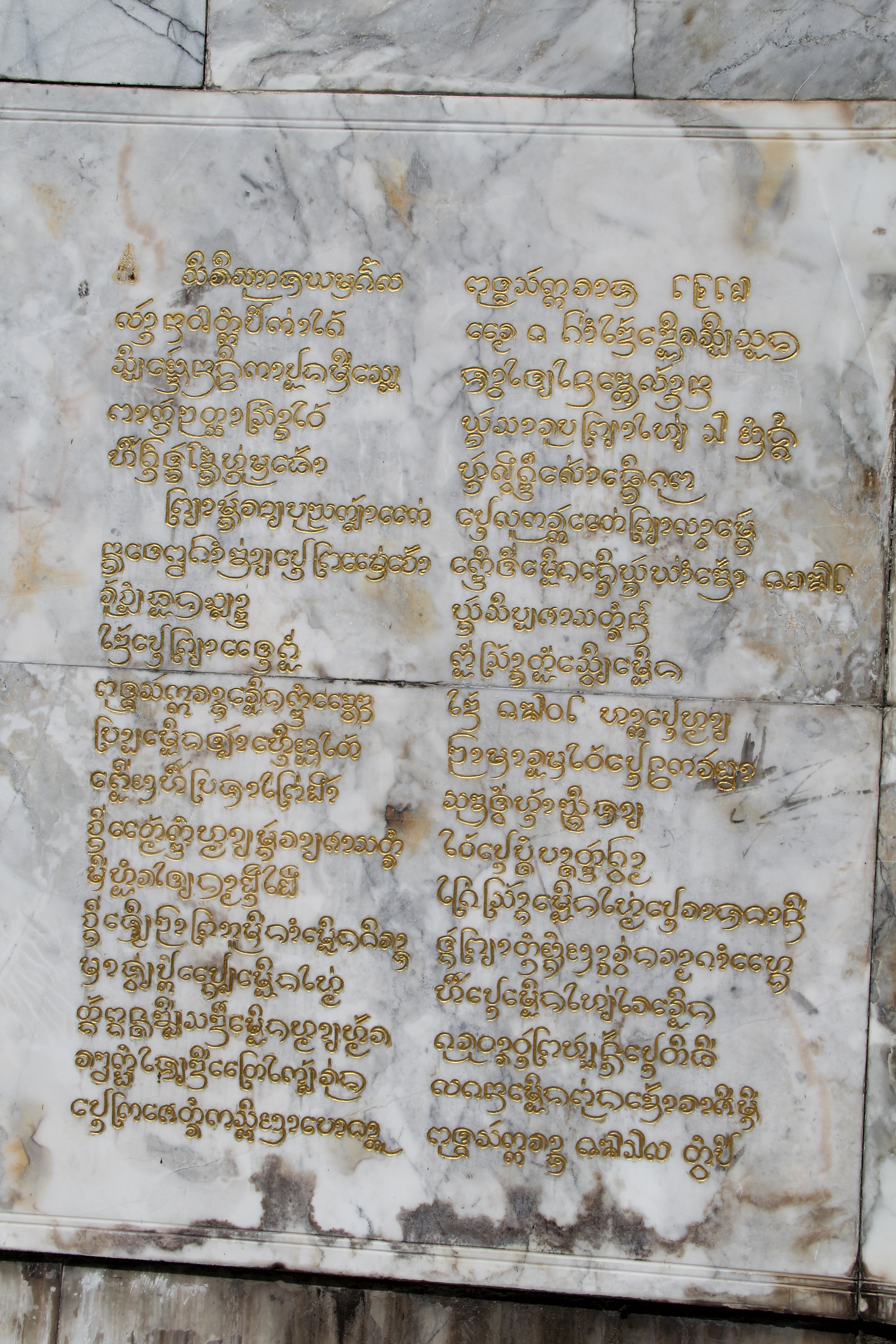
Lanna inscription in Tai Tham script in Chiang Mai

The Tai Tham script shows a strong similarity to the Mon script used by the Mon kingdom of Haripunjaya around the 13th century CE, in the present-day Lamphun Province of Northern Thailand. During the reign of King Tilokkarat, the Tai Tham script was promoted as a tool of political and cultural unification for the Lanna Kingdom. According to some historical perspectives, Tilokkarat was influenced by the Chinese model of using standardized language and scriptures to exert administrative control over an empire. To create a distinct identity for his expanding territories, he mandated a writing system that integrated elements from the Mon, Khmer, and Lao alphabets. This standardization allowed the central Lanna authority to project influence over its diverse vassal states through shared religious and administrative texts. However, evidence indicates that the script may have existed prior to his reign. The oldest known document containing the Tai Tham script is dated to 1376 CE and was found in Sukhothai. The document is a bilingual inscription on a gold folio, containing one line of Pali written in the Tai Tham script, while the vernacular is written in the Siamese language, using the Sukhothai script. The Tai Tham script was adapted to write vernacular languages not later than the 15th century CE, most probably in Chiang Mai, in the Lanna Kingdom. The script spread from Lanna to surrounding areas such as modern day Laos, Isan, Shan State and Sipsong Panna. Numerous local variants developed, such as the Lue variant (Sipsong Panna), the Khuen variant (Shan State) and the Tham Lao variant (Laos and Isan). The variants differ only slightly in appearance, and the system of writing has remained the same.

Following periods of decline after the Burmese conquest of Lanna in 1558, which led to depopulation and reduced manuscript production in Northern Thailand, monastic centers and script usage shifted eastward to Laos, particularly Vientiane and Luang Prabang. By the mid-17th century, Vientiane had become a hub attracting monks from Myanmar, Siam, and Sipsong Panna, fostering a vibrant manuscript culture in Lao Tham. Monks from Lanna also migrated to Luang Prabang for patronage, and texts were exchanged bidirectionally. For instance, in 1523, Chiang Mai sent 60 volumes of Pali texts to Luang Prabang and conversely as Chiang Mai was rebuilding under rulers like Kawila (1782–1816), numerous palm-leaf manuscripts containing Pali scriptures, Jātaka stories, chronicles, and other Buddhist texts in Lao Tham were copied from Luang Prabang and transferred to centers such as Chiang Mai, Phrae, and Nan. This period marked a reversal of earlier flows, with Laos influencing Lanna's textual revival.

During the revival of Northern Thai monastic libraries, scholar-monks like Phra Kru Kanjana (Khruba Kancana), at Wat Sung Men, in Phrae collected and copied thousands of manuscripts based on Lao originals in the Tham Lao script, with direct support from the king of Luang Prabang. This process effectively reintroduced and adapted elements of the Tham Lao script and associated Buddhist literature to Lanna regions, sustaining a shared "Tham script cultural zone" across pre-colonial borders through traveling monks, royal gifts, and trade routes. This network of intellectual exchange facilitated the transmission of Buddhist knowledge, with Luang Prabang emerging as a key center for preserving and producing manuscripts in Lao Tham during periods when northern Thai traditions waned. Luang Prabang's stronger continuity in manuscript production made it a vital source for restoring lost traditions in Lanna. Subsequent copying efforts occurred in Nan around 1840 and again in the 1860s–1870s. These exchanges challenge the unidirectional narratives of cultural flow from Lanna to Laos, instead revealing mutual influences in vernacular commentaries, ritual manuals, and apocryphal Jatakas.

As the name suggests, the use of the Tham (Dharma) script in Lao was restricted to religious literature, either used to transcribe Pali, or religious treatises written in Lao intended solely for the clergy. Religious instructional materials and prayer books dedicated to the laity were written in Tai Noi instead. As a result, only a few people outside the temples were literate in the script. In Isan, evidence of the script includes two stone inscriptions, such as the one housed at Wat Tham Suwannakhuha in Nong Bua Lamphu, dated to 1564, and another from Wat Mahaphon in Maha Sarakham from the same period.

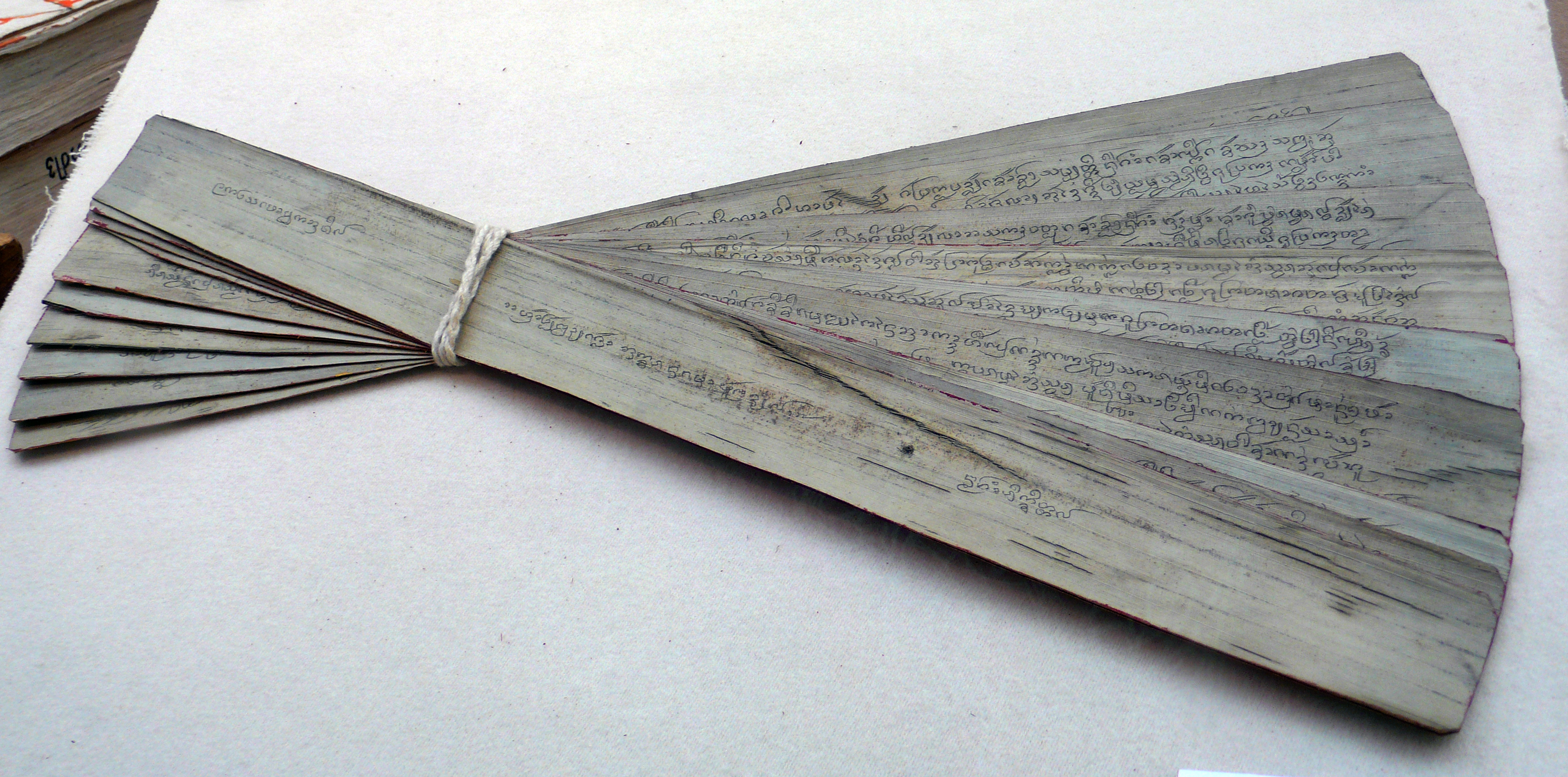
A palm-leaf manuscript written in Tai Tham script. Collection of the Museum of Ethnology, Minzu University of China.

Most of the script is recorded on palm-leaf manuscripts, many of which were destroyed during the 'Thaification' purges of the 1930s; contemporaneously this period of Thai nationalisation also ended its use as the primary written language in Northern Thailand. Although no longer in use in Isan, the alphabet is enjoying a resurgence in Northern Thailand, and is still used as the primary written script for the Tai Lü and Tai Khün languages spoken in the 'Golden Triangle' where Thailand, Laos, Burma and southern China meet. Its use is rather limited to the long-term monks in Laos and most materials published today are in the modern Lao script.

== Characteristics ==
Although both the ancient forms of the Mon and Khmer script are different, they are both abugidas that descend from the Brahmic scripts introduced via contacts with South Indian traders, soldiers, merchants and Brahmans. As a Mon-derived script, Tai Tham has many similarities with the Burmese, Shan, and Mon writing systems and rounder letter forms compared to the angled letters of Khmer. Letters can be stacked, sometimes with special subscript forms, similar to 'ຼ' which was used in Tai Noi and also in modern Lao as the subscript version of 'ຣ' /r/ or 'ລ' /l/ as in Lao: ຫຼວງພຼະບາງ/ຫລວງພຣະບາງ. Letters also are more circular or rounded than the typically angled style of Khmer. However, the Tai Tham script does not use the virama similar to other Eastern Indic scripts like Thai and Khmer, unlike Burmese and Mon.

== Consonants ==
There are 43 Tai Tham consonants. They are divided into three groups: categorized consonants (ᨻ᩠ᨿᩢᨬ᩠ᨩᨶᨶᩲᩅᩢᨣ᩠ᨣ᩼, payanjana nai wak), non-categorized consonants (ᨻ᩠ᨿᩢᨬ᩠ᨩᨶᩋᩅᩢᨣ᩠ᨣ᩼, payanjana awak), and additional consonants (ᨻ᩠ᨿᩢᨬ᩠ᨩᨶᨲᩮᩬᩥ᩵ᨾ, payanjana tueam). Categorized consonants and non-categorized consonants are those derived from Old Mon script used for Pali and Sanskrit languages. Similar to Devanagari, Pallava script, and Burmese script, categorized consonants are divided into 5 subgroups called wak (ᩅᩢᨣ᩠ᨣ᩼) i.e., wak ka (ᨠ), wak ja (ᨧ), wak rata (ᨭ), wak ta (ᨲ), and wak pa (ᨷ). The additional consonants are the consonants invented to write Tai sounds that are originally not found in Pali. In a dictionary, letter ᩂ and ᩄ are often put in the consonant list following the letter ᩁ and ᩃ respectively. However, they are a syllabary (also a vowel) and not a consonant letter.

=== Consonant chart ===
There are 25 categorized consonants, 10 non-categorized consonants, and 8 additional consonants. Similar to Khmer, Tai Tham also has a subjoined form called haang (ᩉᩣ᩠ᨦ), tua joeng (ᨲ᩠ᩅᩫᨩᩮᩥ᩠ᨦ), or tua hoy (ᨲ᩠ᩅᩫᩉᩬ᩠ᨿ᩶). In the Unicode input method, sakot sign (U1A60) (◌᩠) is used to trigger the subjoined forms. The additional consonants are shown in yellow. These consonants have the characteristics of lacking the subjoined form. Similar to Thai script and Lao script, consonants in Tai Tham can be classified into high, mid, and low classes regarding to the tone rules.

	Letter		Subjoined form	Name		Transliteration		IPA		Tone Class
	Letter		Subjoined form	Translit.	IPA	Initial	Final	Initial	Final	Tone Class
1. Wak Ka	ᨠ		◌᩠ᨠ	ka	[kǎ]	k	k	[k]	[k̚]	high
1. Wak Ka	ᨡ		◌᩠ᨡ	xa, kha	[xǎ], [kʰǎ]	x, kh	k	[x], [kʰ]	[k̚]	high
1. Wak Ka	ᨢ (Note: Added consonant invented for Tai sound, as an extension to the original chategorized Pali 'vagga' consonants. These consonants have the characteristics of lacking the subjoined form.)		—	xa, kha	[xǎ]	x, kh	—	[x]	[k̚]	high
1. Wak Ka	ᨣ		◌᩠ᨣ	ka	[ka᷇]	k	k	[k]	[k̚]	low
1. Wak Ka	ᨤ		—	xa, kha	[xa᷇]	x, kh	—	[x]	[k̚]	low
1. Wak Ka	ᨥ		◌᩠ᨥ	xa, kha	[xa᷇], [kʰa᷇]	x, kh	k	[x], [kʰ]	[k̚]	low
1. Wak Ka	ᨦ		◌᩠ᨦ	nga	[ŋa᷇]	ng	ng	[ŋ]	[ŋ]	low
2. Wak Ja	ᨧ		◌᩠ᨧ	ja, ca	[t͡ɕǎ]	j, c	t	[t͡ɕ]	[t̚]	high
2. Wak Ja	ᨨ		◌᩠ᨨ	sa, cha	[sǎ], [t͡ɕʰǎ]	s, ch	—	[s], [t͡ɕʰ]	—	high
2. Wak Ja	ᨩ		◌᩠ᨩ	ja, ca	[t͡ɕa᷇]	j, c	t	[t͡ɕ]	[t̚]	low
2. Wak Ja	ᨪ		—	sa	[sa᷇]	s	t	[s]	[t̚]	low
2. Wak Ja	ᨫ	,	◌᩠ᨫ	sa, cha	[sa᷇], [t͡ɕʰa᷄]	s, ch	t	[s], [t͡ɕʰa᷄]	[t̚]	low
2. Wak Ja	ᨬ		◌᩠ᨬ	nya	[ɲa᷇]	ny, y	n	[ɲ], [j] (Note: In Tai Lue language)	[n]	low
3. Wak Rata	ᨭ		◌᩠ᨭ	rata	[lǎ.tǎ]	t	t	[t]	[t̚]	high
3. Wak Rata	ᨮ	,	◌᩠ᨮ , ◌ᩛ	ratha	[lǎ.tʰǎ]	th	t	[tʰ]	[t̚]	high
3. Wak Rata	ᨯ		◌᩠ᨯ	da	[dǎ]	d, th (Note: Influence from Thai, Pali, and Sanskrit languages.)	t	[d], [tʰ]	[t̚]	mid
3. Wak Rata	ᨰ		◌᩠ᨰ	ratha	[lǎ.tʰa᷇]	th	t	[tʰ]	[t̚]	low
3. Wak Rata	ᨱ		◌᩠ᨱ	rana	[lǎ.na᷇]	n	n	[n]	[n]	low
4. Wak Ta	ᨲ		◌᩠ᨲ	ta	[tǎ]	t	t	[t]	[t̚]	high
4. Wak Ta	ᨳ		◌᩠ᨳ	tha	[tʰǎ]	th	t	[tʰ]	[t̚]	high
4. Wak Ta	ᨴ		◌᩠ᨴ	ta	[ta᷇]	t	t	[t]	[t̚]	low
4. Wak Ta	ᨵ		◌᩠ᨵ	tha	[tʰa᷇]	th	t	[tʰ]	[t̚]	low
4. Wak Ta	ᨶ		◌᩠ᨶ	na	[na᷇]	n	n	[n]	[n]	low
5. Wak Pa	ᨷ		◌᩠ᨷ , ◌ᩝ	ba	[bǎ]	b	p	[b] (Note: When used to write Tai words.)	[p̚]	mid
5. Wak Pa	ᨷ		◌᩠ᨷ	pa (Note: When used to write Pali-Sanskrit derived words.)	[pǎ]	p	p	[p]	[p̚]	high
5. Wak Pa	ᨸ (Note: Used only for Tai words, not for Pali.)		–	pa	[pǎ]	p	p	[p]	[p̚]	high
5. Wak Pa	ᨹ		◌᩠ᨹ	pha	[pʰǎ]	ph	–	[pʰ]	–	high
5. Wak Pa	ᨺ		–	fa	[fǎ]	f	–	[f]	–	high
5. Wak Pa	ᨻ		◌᩠ᨻ , ◌ᩛ	pa	[pa᷇]	p	p	[p]	[p̚]	low
5. Wak Pa	ᨼ		–	fa	[fa᷇]	f	p	[f]	[p̚]	low
5. Wak Pa	ᨽ		◌᩠ᨽ	pha	[pʰa᷇]	ph	p	[pʰ]	[p̚]	low
5. Wak Pa	ᨾ		◌᩠ᨾ , ◌ᩜ	ma	[ma᷇]	m	m	[m]	[m]	low
6. Awak	ᨿ		◌᩠ᨿ	nya	[ɲa᷇]	ny, y	–	[ɲ], [j]	–	low
6. Awak	ᩀ		–	ya	[jǎ]	y	–	[j]	–	mid
6. Awak	ᩁ		◌᩠ᩁ , ᩕ	ra, la	[la᷇]	r, (Note: Often transliterated as 'r' to preserve the semantics for Thai and Pali-Sanskrit words.) l, h	n	[r], [l], [h]	[n]	low
6. Awak	ᩃ		◌᩠ᩃ , ◌ᩖ	la	[la᷇]	l	n	[l]	[n]	low
6. Awak	ᩅ		◌᩠ᩅ	wa	[wa᷇]	w	–	[w]	–	low
6. Awak	ᩆ		◌᩠ᩆ	sa	[sǎ]	s	t	[s]	[t̚]	high
6. Awak	ᩇ		◌᩠ᩇ	sa	[sǎ]	s	t	[s]	[t̚]	high
6. Awak	ᩈ		◌᩠ᩈ , ◌ᩞ	sa	[sǎ]	s	t	[s]	[t̚]	high
6. Awak	ᩉ		◌᩠ᩉ	ha	[hǎ]	h	–	[h]	–	high
6. Awak	ᩊ		◌᩠ᩊ	la	[la᷇]	l	n	[l]	[n]	low
6. Awak	ᩋ	,	◌ᩬ	a	[ʔǎ]	–	–	[ʔ]	–	mid
6. Awak	ᩌ		–	ha	[ha᷇]	h	–	[h]	–	low

=== Consonant digraph with Ha ===
Certain consonants in the low-class group lack their high-class counterpart. These consonants are sometimes called the single low-class consonants. Their high-class counterparts are created by the combination with letter high Ha (ᩉ) as a digraph, called Ha Nam (ᩉ ᨶᩣᩴ).

Letter	Name		Transliteration		IPA		Tone Class
Letter	Translit.	IPA	Initial	Final	Initial	Final	Tone Class
ᩉ᩠ᨦ	nga	[ŋǎ]	ng	–	[ŋ]	–	high
ᩉ᩠ᨶ	na	[nǎ]	n	–	[n]	–	high
ᩉ᩠ᨾ	ma	[mǎ]	m	–	[m]	–	high
ᩉ᩠ᨿ	nya	[ɲǎ]	ny	–	[ɲ], [j] (Note: In Tai Lue language)	–	high
ᩉᩕ	ra, la, ha	[rǎ], [lǎ], [hǎ]	r, (Note: Often transliterated as 'r' to preserve the semantics for Thai and Pali-Sanskrit words, as well as the historical pronunciation (circa. 16th century or before).) l, h	–	[r], (Note: For contemporary texts, it represents the influence from Thai, Pali, and Sanskrit languages. For old manuscripts, it represents the historical pronunciation circa. 16th century or before.) [l], [h]	–	high
ᩉᩖ, ᩉ᩠ᩃ	la	[lǎ]	l	–	[l]	–	high
ᩉ᩠ᩅ	wa	[wǎ]	w	–	[w]	–	high

=== Consonant cluster ===
Tai Tham has three medial letters to form a consonant cluster: medial La (◌ᩖ a.k.a La Noi), medial Ra (ᩕ a.k.a Rawong), and medial Wa. Consonant cluster with medial Wa is the only true consonant cluster where both consonants are pronounced as one phoneme. Consonant cluster with Medial La and Medial Ra are considered a false consonant cluster as they do not produce the same effect. They are the remnant of the Proto-Southwestern Tai initial consonant clusters that existed during the early development of Tai Tham before the 16th century.

==== Medial La ====
Medial La is a silent letter and not pronounced. For example, the word ᨸᩖᩦ and ᨸᩦ are both pronounced pi. Thus, it is considered a false consonant cluster. The use of Medial La is now preserved only for a semantic purpose.

Letter		Name		Transliteration		IPA	Tone Class
Letter		Translit.	IPA	Phonetic	Semantic	IPA	Tone Class
ᨠᩖ	ᨠ᩠ᩃ	ka	[kǎ]	k	kl	[k]	high
ᨣᩖ	ᨣ᩠ᩃ	ka	[ka᷇]	k	kl	[k]	low
ᨸᩖ	ᨸ᩠ᩃ	pa	[pǎ]	p	pl	[p]	high
ᨹᩖ	ᨹ᩠ᩃ	pha	[pʰǎ]	ph	phl	[pʰ]	high
ᨻᩖ	ᨻ᩠ᩃ	pa	[pa᷇]	p	pl	[p]	low
ᨽᩖ	ᨽ᩠ᩃ	pha	[pʰa᷇]	ph	phl	[pʰ]	low
ᨾᩖ	ᨾ᩠ᩃ	ma	[ma᷇]	m	ml	[m]	low

==== Medial Ra (Rawong) ====
Consonant cluster with medial Ra can be divided into two groups: one with an initial consonant sound change and one without the sound change. In some cases, an additional phoneme /l/ may be added with the initial consonant pronounced as a half-syllable. Noting that the /l/ phoneme also carries the tone of the initial consonant. Thus, it is considered a false consonant cluster.

===== With sound change =====
Consonant cluster with medial Ra changes the sound of the voiceless plosive consonants /k/, /t/, and /p/ to the aspirated plosive consonants /kʰ/, /tʰ/, and /pʰ/, respectively.

Letter	Name		Transliteration		IPA	Tone Class
Letter	Translit.	IPA	Phonetic	Semantic	IPA	Tone Class
ᨠᩕ	xa, kha	[xǎ], [kʰǎ]	kh, x	kr	[x]	high
ᨡᩕ	xa, kha	[xǎ], [kʰǎ]	kh, x	khr	[x]	high
ᨣᩕ	xa, kha	[xa᷇], [kʰa᷇]	kh, x	khr	[x]	low
ᨲᩕ	thala	[tʰa.lǎ]	thl	tr	[tʰa.l]	high
ᨲᩕ	tha	[tʰǎ]	th	tr	[tʰ]	high
ᨴᩕ	thala	[tʰa᷇.la᷇]	thl	thr	[tʰa᷇.l]	low
ᨴᩕ	tha	[tʰa᷇]	th	thr	[tʰ]	low
ᨷᩕ	pha	[pʰǎ]	ph	pr	[pʰ]	high
ᨹᩕ	pha	[pʰǎ]	ph	phr	[pʰ]	high
ᨻᩕ	pha	[pʰa᷇]	ph	phr	[pʰ]	low

===== Without sound change =====
Consonant cluster with medial Ra does not change the sound of /t͡ɕ/ and /s/, but an additional phoneme /l/ is often added.

Letter	Name		Transliteration		IPA	Tone Class
Letter	Translit.	IPA	Phonetic	Semantic	IPA	Tone Class
ᨧᩕ	jala	[t͡ɕa.lǎ]	chl, jl	chr, jr	[t͡ɕa.l]	high
ᨧᩕ	ja	[t͡ɕʰǎ]	ch, j	chr, jr	[t͡ɕʰ]	high
ᨩᩕ	ja	[t͡ɕa]	ch, j	chr, jr	[t͡ɕʰ]	low
ᨪᩕ	sala	[sa᷇.la᷇]	sl	sr	[sa᷇.l]	low
ᩈᩕ	sala	[sa.lǎ]	sl	sr	[sa.l]	high
ᩆᩕ	sala	[sa.lǎ]	sl	sr	[sa.l]	high

==== Medial Wa ====
Consonant cluster with medial Wa is the only true consonant cluster where both consonants are pronounced as one phoneme.

Letter	Name		Transliteration	IPA	Tone Class
Letter	Translit.	IPA	Transliteration	IPA	Tone Class
ᨠ᩠ᩅ	kwa	[kwǎ]	kw	[kw]	high
ᨣ᩠ᩅ	kwa	[kwa᷇]	kw	[kw]	low
ᨡ᩠ᩅ	xwa	[xwǎ]	khw, xw	[xw]	high
ᨢ᩠ᩅ	xwa	[xwǎ]	khw, xw	[xw]	high
ᨤ᩠ᩅ	xwa	[xwa᷇]	khw, xw	[xw]	low
ᩉ᩠ᨦ᩠ᩅ	ngwa	[ŋwǎ]	ngw	[ŋw]	high
ᨦ᩠ᩅ	ngwa	[ŋwa᷇]	ngw	[ŋw]	low
ᨧ᩠ᩅ	jwa	[t͡ɕwǎ]	jw, chw	[t͡ɕw]	high
ᨩ᩠ᩅ	jwa	[t͡ɕwa᷇]	jw, chw	[t͡ɕw]	low
ᨯ᩠ᩅ	dwa	[dwǎ]	dw	[dw]	mid
ᨲ᩠ᩅ	twa	[twǎ]	tw	[tw]	high
ᨴ᩠ᩅ	twa	[twa᷇]	thw	[tw]	low
ᨶ᩠ᩅ	nwa	[nwa᷇]	nw	[nw]	low
ᩀ᩠ᩅ	ywa	[jwǎ]	yw	[jw]	mid
ᩉ᩠ᨿ᩠ᩅ	nywa	[ɲwǎ]	nyw, yw, gnw	[ɲw]	high
ᨿ᩠ᩅ	nywa	[ɲwa᷇]	nyw, yw, gnw	[ɲw]	low
ᩁ᩠ᩅ	rwa, lwa	[lwa᷇]	rw, lw	[lw]	low
ᩉᩖ᩠ᩅ, ᩉ᩠ᩃ᩠ᩅ	lwa	[lwǎ]	lw	[lw]	high
ᩃ᩠ᩅ	lwa	[lwa᷇]	lw	[lw]	low
ᩈ᩠ᩅ	swa	[swǎ]	sw	[sw]	high
ᨪ᩠ᩅ	swa	[swa᷇]	sw	[sw]	low
ᩋ᩠ᩅ	ʔwa	[ʔwǎ]	ʔw	[ʔw]	low

=== Special letters ===
Letter		Name			Phonetic value (IPA)	Comments
Letter		Tham	Translit.	IPA	Phonetic value (IPA)	Comments
ᩓ	,	ᩃᩯᩡ, ᩃᩯ	lae	[lɛ̄ː]	[lɛʔ], [lɛ̄ː]	Ligature of letter ᩃ (la) and superscript vowel sign ᩮ (e).
ᨶᩣ		ᨶᩣ	naa	[nāː]	[nāː]	Ligature of letter ᨶ (na) and vowel sign ᩣ (a).
ᨬ᩠ᨬ		ᨬᨬ	nya nya	[ɲa᷇ʔ ɲa᷇ʔ]	[n.ɲ]	Ligature of letter ᨱ (rana) and ᨬ (nya), used in lieu of double ᨬ.
ᩔ		ᩈ ᩈᩬᨦᩉᩬ᩶ᨦ	sa song hong	[sǎː sɔ̌ːŋ hɔ᷇ːŋ]	[t̚.s], [s̚.s]	Ligature of double ᩈ (high sa).
ᩕ		ᩁᩁᩰᩫ᩠ᨦ	rarong, rahong	[la᷇.hōːŋ]	[r], [l], [ʰ]	Subjoined form of letter ᩁ (ra) for a consonant cluster such as ᨷᩕ (pra) ᨻᩕ (pra) as opposed to the subjoined form -᩠ᩁ used as a final consonant. Traditionally considered as a special letter.

== Vowels ==
Vowel characters come in two forms: as stand-alone letters for writing initial vowels or as diacritics that can be attached to all sides of the consonant letters. However, Lanna excels in terms of the number of diacritics used. Some vowel sounds can be written with a combination of as many as four diacritics: one on each side of the consonant.

=== Independent vowels ===
Independent vowels are mainly reserved for writing Pali words, except for ᩐᩣ /ʔau/ which is used as a special vowel sign and not for Pali words.

Tai Tham	IPA	Transliteration
ᩋ	/áʔ/	a
ᩋᩣ	/āː/	aa
ᩍ	/íʔ/	i
ᩎ	/īː/	ii
ᩏ	/úʔ/	u
ᩐ	/ūː/	uu
ᩑ	/ēː/	e
ᩒ	/ōː/	o
ᩂ	/li/, /lɯ̄ː/, /lɯ᷇ʔ/, /lɤː/	rue, ruue, ri, roe
ᩄ	/li/, /lɯ̄ː/, /lɯ᷇ʔ/, /lɤː/	lue, luue, li, loe
ᩐᩣ	/aw/	aw, au, ao

=== Dependent vowels ===
Short vowels (Note: Short vowels are followed by a glottal stop /ʔ/ if they are followed by another consonant.) (with consonant ᨠ)			Long vowels (with consonant ᨠ)		
IPA	No final consonant	With final consonant (ᨦ) (Note: Hypothetical spelling for demonstrating the consonant and vowel positions.)	IPA	No final consonant	With final consonant (ᨦ)
Simple vowels
/a/	ᨠ, ᨠᩡ	ᨠᩢ᩠ᨦ	/aː/	ᨠᩣ (Note: Symbol ◌ᩤ may be used instead for narrow consonants such as ᨣ ᨧ ᨵ ᨰ ᨴ ᨷ ᩅ to increase legibility.)	ᨠᩣ᩠ᨦ
/i/	ᨠᩥ	ᨠᩥ᩠ᨦ	/iː/	ᨠᩦ	ᨠᩦ᩠ᨦ
/ɯ/	ᨠᩧ	ᨠᩧ᩠ᨦ	/ɯː/	ᨠᩨ	ᨠᩨ᩠ᨦ
/u/	ᨠᩩ	ᨠᩩᨦ, ᨠᩩᨦ᩼	/uː/	ᨠᩪ	ᨠᩪᨦ, ᨠᩪᨦ᩼
/e/	ᨠᩮᩡ, ᨠᩮᩬᩡ	ᨠᩮᩢ᩠ᨦ, ᨠᩮᩬᨦᩡ	/eː/	ᨠᩮ	ᨠᩮ᩠ᨦ
/ɛ/	ᨠᩯᩡ, ᨠᩯᩬᩡ	ᨠᩯᩢ᩠ᨦ, ᨠᩯᩬᨦᩡ	/ɛː/	ᨠᩯ	ᨠᩯ᩠ᨦ
/o/	ᨠᩰᩡ	ᨠᩫ᩠ᨦ	/oː/	ᨠᩰ, ᨠᩮᩣ (Note: Only used for Pali words.)	ᨠᩰᩫ᩠ᨦ, ᨠᩰ᩠ᨦ
/ɔ/	ᨠᩰᩬᩡ	ᨠᩬᩢᨦ, ᨠᩬᨦᩡ	/ɔː/	ᨠᩬᩴ, ᨠᩳ (Note: Used in Khuen and Lue spelling conventions.)	ᨠᩬᨦ, ᨠᩬᨦ᩼
/ɤ/	ᨠᩮᩬᩥᩡ	ᨠᩮᩥᩢ᩠ᨦ, ᨠᩮᩥ᩠ᨦᩡ	/ɤː/	ᨠᩮᩬᩥ	ᨠᩮᩥ᩠ᨦ
Diphthongs
/iaʔ/	ᨠ᩠ᨿᩮᩡ	ᨠ᩠ᨿᩢᨦ, ᨠ᩠ᨿᨦᩡ	/ia/	ᨠ᩠ᨿᩮ (Note: According to the Unicode encoding order, subjoined ya ◌᩠ᨿ in the case of mai kia ᨠ᩠ᨿᩮ is considered as a part of vowel cluster and classed as a medial ya which precedes vowels; therefore, the encoding order of mai kia is ᨠ + ᩠ᨿ + ᩮ. However, in the case of mai kai in Pali-Sanskrit form like ᨠᩱ᩠ᨿ, the subjoined ya ◌᩠ᨿ is considered as a final consonant because it is derived from the Pali-Sanskrit phoneme kaya. Thus, the encoding order is ᨠ + ᩱ + ᩠ᨿ)	ᨠ᩠ᨿᨦ
/ɯaʔ/	ᨠᩮᩬᩥᩋᩡ	ᨠᩮᩬᩥᩢᨦ, ᨠᩮᩬᩥᨦᩡ	/ɯa/	ᨠᩮᩬᩥᩋ	ᨠᩮᩬᩥᨦ
/ɯaʔ/	ᨠᩮᩬᩨᩋᩡ	ᨠᩮᩬᩨᩢᨦ, ᨠᩮᩬᩨᨦᩡ	/ɯa/	ᨠᩮᩬᩨᩋ	ᨠᩮᩬᩨᨦ
/uaʔ/	ᨠ᩠ᩅᩫᩡ	ᨠ᩠ᩅᩢᨦ, ᨠ᩠ᩅᨦᩡ	/ua/	ᨠ᩠ᩅᩫ	ᨠ᩠ᩅᨦ, ᨠ᩠ᩅᨦ᩼
Phonetic diphthongs (Note: Only shows the diphthongs with special diacritic symbols.)
/aw/	ᨠᩮᩢᩣ, ᨠᩮᩫᩢᩣ, ᨠᩳ, (Note: Used in Lanna spelling convention, called Mai Kao Ho Nueng (ᨾᩱ᩶ᨠᩮᩢᩣᩉᩬᩴ᩵ᩉ᩠ᨶᩧ᩶ᨦ)) ᨠᩪᩦ (Note: Called Mai Kao Ju Ji (ᨾᩱ᩶ᨠᩮᩢᩣᨧᩪ᩶ᨧᩦ᩶))	-	/aːw/	ᨠᩣ᩠ᩅ	-
/iw/	ᨠᩥ᩠ᩅ	-			
/ew/	ᨠᩮ᩠ᩅᩡ, ᨠᩮᩢ᩠ᩅ	-	/eːw/	ᨠᩮ᩠ᩅ, ᨠ᩠ᨿᩅ, ᨠ᩠ᨿᩴ	-
/ɛw/	ᨠᩯ᩠ᩅᩡ, ᨠᩯᩢ᩠ᩅ	-	/ɛːw/	ᨠᩯ᩠ᩅ	-
			/iaw/	ᨠ᩠ᨿᩅ, ᨠ᩠ᨿᩴ	-
/aj/	ᨠᩱ, ᨠᩲ, ᨠᩱ᩠ᨿ, ᨠᩱᨿ᩠ᨿ, ᨠᩮᨿ᩠ᨿ, ᨠᩢ᩠ᨿ	-	/aːj/	ᨠᩣ᩠ᨿ	-
/ɯj/	ᨠᩧ᩠ᨿ, ᨠᩨ᩠ᨿᩡ	-	/ɯːj/	ᨠᩨ᩠ᨿ	-
/uj/	ᨠᩩ᩠ᨿ	-	/uːj/	ᨠᩪ᩠ᨿ	-
			/oːj/	ᨠᩰᩫ᩠ᨿ, ᨠ᩠ᩅ᩠ᨿ	-
/ɔj/	ᨠᩬ᩠ᨿᩡ, ᨠᩬᩢ᩠ᨿ	-	/ɔːj/	ᨠᩭ, ᨠᩬ᩠ᨿ	-
			/ɤːj/	ᨠᩮᩥ᩠ᨿ, ᨠᩮᩬᩥ᩠ᨿ, ᨠᩮᩬᩨ᩠ᨿ	-
			/uaj/	ᨠ᩠ᩅ᩠ᨿ	-
			/ɯaj/	ᨠᩮᩬᩥ᩠ᨿ, ᨠᩮᩬᩨ᩠ᨿ	-
Extra vowels
/aŋ/	ᨠᩴ, ᨠᩘ	—			
/am/	ᨠᩣᩴ	—			

== Tone marks ==
Tone marks	Name			Comments
Tone marks	Tham	Transliteration	IPA	Comments
᩵	ᨾᩱ᩶ᩀᩢ᩠ᨠ, ᨾᩱ᩶ᩀᩰᩬᩡ	mai yak, mai yo	/máj.jǎk/, /máj.jɔ́ʔ/	
᩶	ᨾᩱ᩶ᨡᩬᩴᨩ᩶ᩣ᩠ᨦ	mai kho jang	/máj.xɔ̌ː.t͡ɕáːŋ/	
ᩢ	ᨾᩱ᩶ᨪᩢ᩠ᨯ	mai sat	/máj.sát/	Interchangeable with mai kho jang.
᩷	ᨾᩱ᩶ᨠᩳᩉ᩠ᨶᩮᩬᩥᩋ	mai ko nuea	/máj.kɔ̌.nɯa̯/	Invented for Khuen language, shape like vowel sign -ᩳ (mai ko).
᩸	ᨾᩱ᩶ᩈᩬᨦᩉ᩠ᨶᩮᩬᩥᩋ	mai song nuea	/máj.sɔ̌ːŋ.nɯa̯/	Invented for Khuen language, shape like ᪂ (Hora digit 2).
᩹	ᨾᩱ᩶ᩈᩣ᩠ᨾᩉ᩠ᨶᩮᩬᩥᩋ	mai sam nuea	/máj.sǎːm.nɯa̯/	Invented for Khuen language, shape like ᪃ (Hora digit 3).
๋	-	–	-	Borrowed from Thai script "Mai Chattawa" into Khuen language. Interchangeable with mai song nuea.
้	-	–	-	Borrowed from Thai script "Mai Tho" into Khuen language. Interchangeable with mai sam nuea.

=== Tone mark conjugation ===
There are six phonemic tones in the Chiang Mai dialect of Northern Thai: low-rising, low-falling, high-level with glottal stop, mid-level, high-falling, and high-rising. Tones in Chiang Mai dialect are very close to the standard Thai five tones systems and the equivalence can be drawn between the two. Lanna–Thai dictionaries often equate Chiang Mai tones with standard Thai tones, shown in a table below.

Northern Thai–Standard Thai tone equivalence
Chiang Mai Tone		Thai Tone Equivalence			
Name	Tone letters	Name			Tone letters
mid-level	33 or ˧˧	สามัญ	saman	mid-level	33 or ˧˧
low-falling	21 or ˨˩	เอก	ek	low-falling	21 or ˨˩
high-falling	42 or ˦˨	โท	tho	high-falling	41 or ˦˩
high-level, glottalized	44ʔ or ˦˦ʔ	โทพิเศษ (Note: Name frequently given by grammar books.)	special tho	–	–
high-rising	45 or ˦˥	ตรี	tree	high-rising	45 or ˦˥
low-rising	24 or ˨˦	จัตวา	chattawa	low-rising	24 or ˨˥

Tone mark conjugation system of Tai Tham highly correlates with the system used by Thai script. Despite the difference in tone quality between Northern Thai, Tai Khuen, Thai, and Lao; equivalent words in each language are, in large part, marked with the same (or equivalent) tone mark. For example, the word ᨣ᩶ᩤ (Northern Thai pronunciation: [kaː˦˥]; Khuen: [kaː˦˩]) which is equivalent to Thai ค้า (Thai pronunciation: [kʰaː˦˥]), and Lao ຄ້າ (Lao pronunciation: [kʰaː˥˨]) all has the same meaning "to trade" and is expressed with the same or equivalent tone mark mai tho/mai kho jang but is pronounced with different tones differed by the languages.

Tone mark conjugation in Tai Tham follows the same model used for Thai script. Consonants are divided into 3 classes: high, mid, low; with some degree of variation form Thai script due to the phonological differences between Northern Thai and standard Thai. Consonants in each class are combined with these tone marks to give a different tonal pattern.

Only two tone marks mai yo (᩵) and mai kho jang (᩶) are mainly used. Low class and High class consonants only have one tone per one tone mark. Hence, to achieve the 6 tones while using only 2 tone marks (and one case of no tone mark), they are conjugated as a couple of the same sound.

High class–Low class consonants couple for tone conjugation
IPA	High class	Low class
[k]	ᨠ	ᨣ
[x]	ᨡ, ᨢ	ᨤ, ᨥ
[ŋ]	ᩉ᩠ᨦ	ᨦ
[t͡ɕ]	ᨧ	ᨩ
[s]	ᨨ, ᩆ, ᩇ, ᩈ	ᨪ, ᨫ
[ɲ]	ᩉ᩠ᨿ	ᨬ, ᨿ
[t]	ᨭ, ᨲ	ᨴ
[tʰ]	ᨮ, ᨳ	ᨰ, ᨵ
[n]	ᩉ᩠ᨶ	ᨱ, ᨶ
[p]	ᨷ (Note: Pali derived words.) ᨸ	ᨻ
[pʰ]	ᨹ	ᨽ
[f]	ᨺ	ᨼ
[m]	ᩉ᩠ᨾ	ᨾ
[r]	ᩉᩕ	ᩁ
[l]	ᩉᩖ, ᩉ᩠ᩃ, ᩉᩕ	ᩃ, ᩊ, ᩁ
[h]	ᩉ, ᩉᩕ	ᩌ, ᩁ
[w]	ᩉ᩠ᩅ	ᩅ

Notes

Mid class consonants ([ʔ], [b], [d], and [j]) do not have a couple for tone conjugation. Hence, different tones can be expressed with the same tone mark. Readers have to rely on the context in order to know the correct tone pronunciation. Therefore, to solve this ambiguity, three new tone marks: mai ko nuea (᩷), mai song nuea (᩸), and mai sam nuea (᩹) were invented for the mid class consonants in Khuen language. However, these three new tone marks aren't used in Lanna spelling convention and even in Khuen, they are rarely used. The use of these new three tone marks is also not standardized and may also differ between the dialects of Khuen language.

Moreover, similar to standard Thai, the tonal pattern for each consonant class also differs by vowel length and final consonant sounds, which can be divided into the "checked" and "unchecked" syllables. Checked syllables are a group of syllables with the obstruent coda sounds [p̚], [t̚], [k̚], and [ʔ] (short vowel with no final consonant actually ends with the glottal stop, but often omitted). The unchecked syllables are a group of syllables with the sonorant coda sound [m], [n], [ŋ], [j], and [w].

Hence, by combining the consonant classes and the system of checked–unchecked syllables, the full tone conjugation table can be constructed as shown below. Color codes are assigned in the table to each tone mark: cyan – no tone mark; yellow – mai yo (equi. Thai mai ek); pink – mai kho jang (equi. Thai mai tho). Low class and high class rows are paired together to show the system of the consonant couples.

final consonant sound	Vowel length	Consonant class	Chiang Mai Tone					
final consonant sound	Vowel length	Consonant class	mid-level	low-falling	high-falling	high-level, glottalized	high-rising	low-rising
final consonant sound	Vowel length	Consonant class	Thai Tone Equivalence					
final consonant sound	Vowel length	Consonant class	สามัญ (saman)	เอก (ek)	โท (tho)	โทพิเศษ (special tho) (Note: Not exist in standard Thai, but often approximated as the special falling tone (โทพิเศษ) in many grammar books and the academic circle in Thailand.)	ตรี (tree)	จัตวา (chattawa)
final consonant sound	Vowel length	Consonant class	mid	low	falling	-	high	rising
m, n, ŋ, j, w coda (unchecked syllables) (sonorant)	long & short	Low	ᨴᩣ /taː˧˧/ "to smear"		ᨴ᩵ᩣ /taː˦˨/ "port"		ᨴ᩶ᩣ /taː˦˥/ "to challenge"	
m, n, ŋ, j, w coda (unchecked syllables) (sonorant)	long & short	High		ᨲ᩵ᩣ᩠ᨦ /taːŋ˨˩/ "to carry"		ᨲ᩶ᩣ᩠ᨶ /taːn˦˦ʔ/ "to oppose"		ᨲᩣ /taː˨˦/ "eye"
m, n, ŋ, j, w coda (unchecked syllables) (sonorant)	long & short	Mid	ᩋᩩ᩠ᨿ /ʔuj˧˧/ "soft hair"	ᩋᩩ᩠᩵ᨿ /ʔuj˨˩/ "to scatter"	ᩋᩩ᩠᩶ᨿᩌᩩ᩠᩵ᨿ (Note: Secondary form for mid class consonants. This form is less frequently found, and not listed in some grammar book. However, there are dictionary records of words in this form, especially the word start with ᩋ /ʔ/.) /ʔuj˦˨.huj˦˨/ "greenish"	ᩋᩩ᩠᩶ᨿ /ʔuj˦˦ʔ/ "thigh"	ᩋᩩ᩠᩶ᨿ /ʔuj˦˥/ "grand parents"	ᩋᩩ᩠ᨿ /ʔuj˨˦/ "breast"
ʔ, p̚, t̚, k̚ coda (Note: Some linguists consider this class as separated tones group.) (checked syllables) (obstruent)	long	Low			ᨴᩣ᩠ᨠ /taːk̚˦˨/ "slug"		ᨶᩰ᩠᩶ᨴ (Note: Mostly the borrow words from Thai and English.) /noːt̚˦˥/ "note"	
ʔ, p̚, t̚, k̚ coda (checked syllables) (obstruent)	long	High		ᨲᩣ᩠ᨠ /taːk̚˨˩/ "to dry"				
ʔ, p̚, t̚, k̚ coda (checked syllables) (obstruent)	long	Mid		ᨯᩣ᩠ᨷ /daːp̚˨˩/ "sword"	ᩋᩪ᩶ᨯ /ʔuːt̚˦˨/ "to swell"		ᩋ᩶ᩬᨷ /ʔɔːp̚˦˥/ "bottle neck"	
ʔ, p̚, t̚, k̚ coda (checked syllables) (obstruent)	short	Low					ᨴᩢ᩠ᨠ /tak̚˦˥/ "to greet"	
ʔ, p̚, t̚, k̚ coda (checked syllables) (obstruent)	short	High						ᨲᩢ᩠ᨷ /tap̚˨˦/ "liver"
ʔ, p̚, t̚, k̚ coda (checked syllables) (obstruent)	short	Mid					ᩋᩩ᩶ᨠ /ʔuk̚˦˥/ "to ferment"	ᨯᩢ᩠ᨷ /dap̚˨˦/ "to distinguish (fire)"

== Numerals ==
Lanna has two sets of numerals. The first set, Lek Nai Tham, is mainly used for liturgical purposes. The other set, Lek Hora, is used in general.

Arabic numerals	0	1	2	3	4	5	6	7	8	9
Hora digits	᪀	᪁	᪂	᪃	᪄	᪅	᪆	᪇	᪈	᪉
Tham digits	᪐	᪑	᪒	᪓	᪔	᪕	᪖	᪗	᪘	᪙
Thai numerals	๐	๑	๒	๓	๔	๕	๖	๗	๘	๙
Lao numerals	໐	໑	໒	໓	໔	໕	໖	໗	໘	໙
Burmese numerals	๐	၁	၂	၃	၄	၅	၆	၇	၈	၉
Khmer numerals	០	១	២	៣	៤	៥	៦	៧	៨	៩

== Relation with other scripts ==
Tai Tham is very similar in shape to Burmese script since both are derived from Old Mon script. New Tai Lue is a descendant of Tai Tham with its shape simplified and many consonants removed. Thai script looks distinctive from Tai Tham but covers all equivalent consonants including 8 additional consonants, as Thai is the closest sister language to the Northern Thai, Khuen, and Lue languages. A variation of Thai script (Sukhothai script) called Fakkham script was also used in Lanna to write Northern Thai, Khuen, and Lue during the 14th century, influencing the development of the modern Tai Tham script.

	Tai Tham		Burmese	New Tai Lue	Khmer	Thai	Lao
	Unicode	Lanna style	Burmese	New Tai Lue	Khmer	Thai	Lao
1. Wak Ka	ᨠ		က	ᦂ	ក	ก	ກ
1. Wak Ka	ᨡ		ခ	ᦃ	ខ	ข	ຂ
1. Wak Ka	ᨢ		–	–	–	ฃ	–
1. Wak Ka	ᨣ		ဂ	ᦅ	គ	ค	ຄ
1. Wak Ka	ᨤ		–	ᦆ	–	ฅ	–
1. Wak Ka	ᨥ		ဃ	–	ឃ	ฆ	ຆ (modern: ຄ)
1. Wak Ka	ᨦ		င	ᦇ	ង	ง	ງ
2. Wak Ja	ᨧ		စ	ᦈ	ច	จ	ຈ
2. Wak Ja	ᨨ		ဆ	–	ឆ	ฉ	ຉ (modern: ສ)
2. Wak Ja	ᨩ		ဇ	ᦋ	ជ	ช	ຊ
2. Wak Ja	ᨪ		–	ᦌ	–	ซ	ຌ (modern: ຊ)
2. Wak Ja	ᨫ		ဈ	–	ឈ	ฌ	ຌ (modern: ຊ)
2. Wak Ja	ᨬ		ည	–	ញ	ญ	ຎ (modern: ຍ)
3. Wak Rata	ᨭ		ဋ	–	ដ	ฎ, ฏ	ຏ (modern: ຕ)
3. Wak Rata	ᨮ		ဌ	–	ឋ	ฐ	ຐ (modern: ຖ)
3. Wak Rata	ᨯ		ဍ	ᦡ	ឌ	ฑ, ฎ, ด	ຑ (modern: ທ, ດ)
3. Wak Rata	ᨰ		ဎ	–	ឍ	ฒ	ຒ (modern: ທ)
3. Wak Rata	ᨱ		ဏ	–	ណ	ณ	ຓ (modern: ນ)
4. Wak Ta	ᨲ		တ	ᦎ	ត	ต	ຕ
4. Wak Ta	ᨳ		ထ	ᦏ	ថ	ถ	ຖ
4. Wak Ta	ᨴ		ဒ	ᦑ	ទ	ท	ທ
4. Wak Ta	ᨵ		ဓ	ᦒ	ធ	ธ	ຘ (modern: ທ)
4. Wak Ta	ᨶ		န	ᦓ	ន	น	ນ
5. Wak Pa	ᨷ		ပ	ᦢ	ប	บ	ບ
5. Wak Pa	ᨸ		–	ᦔ	–	ป	ປ
5. Wak Pa	ᨹ		ဖ	ᦕ	ផ	ผ	ຜ
5. Wak Pa	ᨺ		–	ᦚ	–	ฝ	ຝ
5. Wak Pa	ᨻ		ဗ	ᦗ	ព	พ	ພ
5. Wak Pa	ᨼ		–	ᦝ	–	ฟ	ຟ
5. Wak Pa	ᨽ		ဘ	ᦘ	ភ	ภ	ຠ (modern: ພ)
5. Wak Pa	ᨾ		မ	ᦙ	ម	ม	ມ
6. Awak	ᨿ		ယ	ᦍ	យ	ย	ຍ
6. Awak	ᩀ		–	ᦊ	–	อย	ຢ
6. Awak	ᩁ		ရ	ᦣ	រ	ร	ຣ (modern: ລ)
6. Awak	ᩃ		လ	ᦟ	ល	ล	ລ
6. Awak	ᩅ		ဝ	ᦞ	វ	ว	ວ
6. Awak	ᩆ		ၐ (modern: သ)	–	ឝ (modern: ស)	ศ	ຨ (modern: ສ)
6. Awak	ᩇ		ၑ (modern: သ)	–	ឞ (modern: ស)	ษ	ຩ (modern: ສ)
6. Awak	ᩈ		သ	ᦉ	ស	ส	ສ
6. Awak	ᩉ		ဟ	ᦠ	ហ	ห	ຫ
6. Awak	ᩊ		ဠ	–	ឡ	ฬ	ຬ (modern: ລ)
6. Awak	ᩋ		အ	ᦀ	អ	อ	ອ
6. Awak	ᩌ		–	–	–	ฮ	ຮ
7. Special	ᩂ		ၒ	–	ឫ	ฤ	–
7. Special	ᩄ		ၔ	–	ឭ	ฦ	–

== Sanskrit and Pali ==
The Tai Tham script (like all Indic scripts) uses a number of modifications to write Pali and related languages (in particular, Sanskrit). When writing Pali, only 33 consonants and 12 vowels are used.

=== Pali consonants in Tai Tham script ===
	Plosive				Nasal	Approximant		Fricative
	voiceless		voiced		Nasal	Approximant		Fricative
	unaspirated	aspirated	unaspirated	aspirated	Nasal	central	lateral	Fricative
Velar	ᨠ ka	ᨡ kha	ᨣ ga	ᨥ gha	ᨦ ṅa			
Palatal	ᨧ ca	ᨨ cha	ᨩ ja	ᨫ jha	ᨬ ña	ᨿ ya		
Retroflex	ᨭ ṭa	ᨮ ṭha	ᨯ ḍa	ᨰ ḍha	ᨱ ṇa	ᩁ ra	ᩊ ḷa	
Dental	ᨲ ta	ᨳ tha	ᨴ da	ᨵ dha	ᨶ na		ᩃ la	ᩈ sa
Labial	ᨷ pa	ᨹ pha	ᨻ ba	ᨽ bha	ᨾ ma	ᩅ va		
Glottal								ᩉ ha

=== Sanskrit consonants in Tai Tham script ===
	Plosive				Nasal	Approximant	Frictive
	voiceless		voiced		voiced	voiced	voiceless
	unaspirated	aspirated	unaspirated	aspirated	unaspirated	unaspirated	aspirated
Guttural	ᨠ ka	ᨡ kha	ᨣ ga	ᨥ gha	ᨦ ṅa	ᩉ ha	
Palatal	ᨧ ca	ᨨ cha	ᨩ ja	ᨫ jha	ᨬ ña	ᨿ ya	ᩆ śa
Retroflex	ᨭ ṭa	ᨮ ṭha	ᨯ ḍa	ᨰ ḍha	ᨱ ṇa	ᩁ ra	ᩇ ṣa
Dental	ᨲ ta	ᨳ tha	ᨴ da	ᨵ dha	ᨶ na	ᩃ la	ᩈ sa
Labial	ᨷ pa	ᨹ pha	ᨻ ba	ᨽ bha	ᨾ ma	ᩅ va	

== Unicode block ==
Tai Tham script was added to the Unicode Standard in October, 2009 with the release of version 5.2.

The Unicode block for Tai Tham is U+1A20–U+1AAF:

Tai Tham^{[1]}^{[2]} Official Unicode Consortium code chart (PDF)
	0	1	2	3	4	5	6	7	8	9	A	B	C	D	E	F
U+1A2x	ᨠ	ᨡ	ᨢ	ᨣ	ᨤ	ᨥ	ᨦ	ᨧ	ᨨ	ᨩ	ᨪ	ᨫ	ᨬ	ᨭ	ᨮ	ᨯ
U+1A3x	ᨰ	ᨱ	ᨲ	ᨳ	ᨴ	ᨵ	ᨶ	ᨷ	ᨸ	ᨹ	ᨺ	ᨻ	ᨼ	ᨽ	ᨾ	ᨿ
U+1A4x	ᩀ	ᩁ	ᩂ	ᩃ	ᩄ	ᩅ	ᩆ	ᩇ	ᩈ	ᩉ	ᩊ	ᩋ	ᩌ	ᩍ	ᩎ	ᩏ
U+1A5x	ᩐ	ᩑ	ᩒ	ᩓ	ᩔ	ᩕ	ᩖ	ᩗ	ᩘ	ᩙ	ᩚ	ᩛ	ᩜ	ᩝ	ᩞ	
U+1A6x	᩠	ᩡ	ᩢ	ᩣ	ᩤ	ᩥ	ᩦ	ᩧ	ᩨ	ᩩ	ᩪ	ᩫ	ᩬ	ᩭ	ᩮ	ᩯ
U+1A7x	ᩰ	ᩱ	ᩲ	ᩳ	ᩴ	᩵	᩶	᩷	᩸	᩹	᩺	᩻	᩼			᩿
U+1A8x	᪀	᪁	᪂	᪃	᪄	᪅	᪆	᪇	᪈	᪉						
U+1A9x	᪐	᪑	᪒	᪓	᪔	᪕	᪖	᪗	᪘	᪙						
U+1AAx	᪠	᪡	᪢	᪣	᪤	᪥	᪦	ᪧ	᪨	᪩	᪪	᪫	᪬	᪭		
Notes 1.As of Unicode version 17.0 2.Grey areas indicate non-assigned code points

== Fonts ==
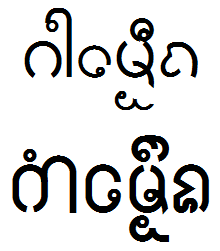
Lanna Alif vs Lanna Unicode UI

Supports for Tai Tham Unicode font in Microsoft Windows and Microsoft office are still limited causing the widespread use of non-Unicode fonts. Fonts published by the Royal Society of Thailand and Chiang Mai University are also non-Unicode due to this problem and to maximize the ability to transcribe and display the ancient Tai Tham text, which frequently contains various special ligatures and symbols not supported by Unicode. Non-Unicode fonts often use a combination of Thai script and Latin Unicode ranges to resolves the incompatibility problem of Unicode Tai Tham in Microsoft office. However, these fonts may encounter a display problem when used on web browsers as the text can be encoded as an unintelligible Thai text instead. In recent years, many Tai Tham Unicode fonts have been developed for web display and communications via smart phones. Google's Noto Sans Tai Tham becomes the default font for Tai Tham on Mac OS and iOS. However, the current version of this font still fails to display Tai Tham text correctly. The table below gives a list of publicly available Tai Tham fonts.

Font name	Supports		Script style	Font family	Publisher (with page link)
Font name	Unicode (Note: Not supported by Microsoft Office.)	Non-Unicode (Note: Using Thai Unicode block, suitable for Microsoft Office.)	Script style	Font family	Publisher (with page link)
A Tai Tham KH New V3	Yes	No	Khün	Sans-serif	Arloka Tai Tham Unicode group
A Tai Tham LN	Yes	No	Lanna	Serif	Arloka
Chiangsaen Alif	Yes	No	Lanna	Sans-serif	Alif Silapachai
CR Insom Lanna	Yes	Yes	Lanna	Serif	Worawut Thanawatanawanich
Hariphunchai	Yes	No	Lanna	Serif	TragerStudio, Richard Wordingham
Kotthabun	Yes	No	Lao Tham	Serif	Theppitak Karoonboonyanan Tai Tham Unicode group
Lanna Alif	Yes	No	Lanna	Sans-serif	Alif Silapachai
Lamphun	Yes	No	Lanna	Serif	Richard Wordingham
LN Mon Saen	No	Yes	Khün	Serif	Chiang Mai University (page link), Pichai Saengboon
LN Tilok	No	Yes	Lanna	Serif	Chiang Mai University (page link), Pichai Saengboon
LN Wat Inda	No	Yes	Khün	Serif	Chiang Mai University (page link), Pichai Saengboon
Noto Sans Tai Tham	Yes	No	Khün	Sans-serif	Google Fonts
Pali-Kotthabun	Pali only	Yes	Lao Tham	Serif	Worawut Thanawatanawanich, Theppitak Karoonboonyanan
Pali-Tilok	Pali only	Yes	Lanna	Serif	Worawut Thanawatanawanich, Pichai Saengboon
Payap Lanna	Yes	No	Lanna	Serif	SIL International
RST-ISAN	No	Yes	Lao Tham	Serif	Royal Society of Thailand (page link)
RST-LANNA	No	Yes	Lanna	Serif	Royal Society of Thailand (page link)
Tai Tham BXL	Yes	No	Lue	Serif	Tai Tham Unicode group
Tai Tham Kammattana	Yes	No	Khün	Serif	Tai Tham Unicode group
Tai Tham Kasem	Yes	No	Lanna	Serif	Tai Tham Unicode group
Tai Tham Kruba Promma	Yes	No	Lanna	Serif	Tai Tham Unicode group
Tai Tham Nang Kham	Yes	No	Khün	Serif	Tai Tham Unicode group
Tai Tham Sripanyawut	Yes	No	Lanna	Serif	Tai Tham Unicode group
Tai Tham Thatdaokham	Yes	No	Lue	Serif	Tai Tham Unicode group
VS Tham Lanxang	Yes	Yes	Lao Tham	Serif	Worawut Thanawatanawanich
