= Tai Lue language =

Southwestern Tai language

Tai Lue
- ᦅᧄᦺᦑᦟᦹᧉ, ᨣᩤᩴᨴᩱ᩠ᨿᩃᩨᩢ kam tai lue
- Pronunciation: [kâm.tâj.lɯ̀]
- Native to: China, Laos, Thailand, Myanmar, Vietnam
- Region: Yunnan, China
- Ethnicity: Tai Lue
- Native speakers: (550,000 cited 2000–2013)
- Language family: Kra–Dai: Tai; Southwestern (Thai); Chiang Saen; Tai Lue
- Writing system: Tai Tham alphabet, Thai alphabet, New Tai Lue alphabet

Official status
- Recognised minority language in: China; Laos; Thailand; Myanmar; Vietnam

Language codes
- ISO 639-3: khb
- Glottolog: luuu1242
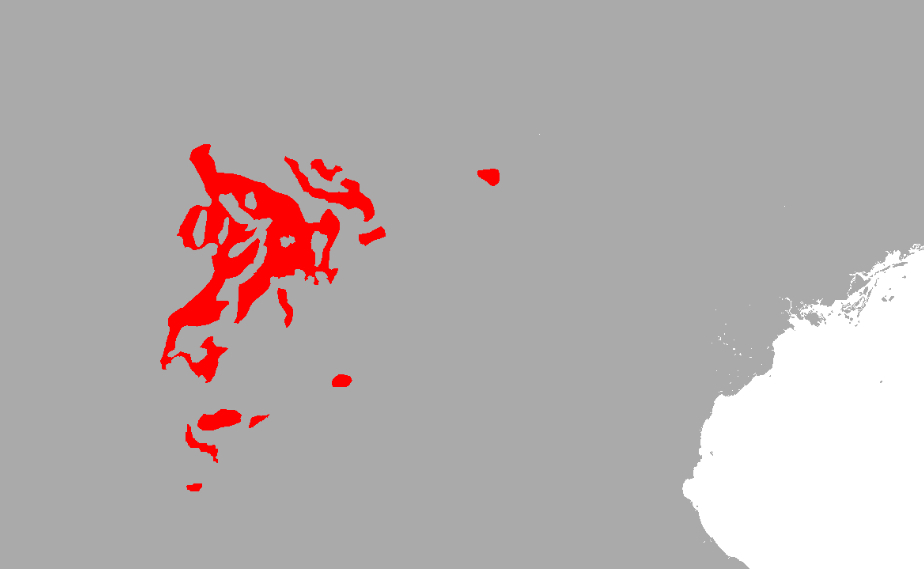

Tai Lue (New Tai Lü: ᦅᧄᦺᦑᦟᦹᧉ, Tai Tham: ᨣᩤᩴᨴᩱ᩠ᨿᩃᩨᩢ, kam tai lue, [kâm.tâj.lɯ̀]) (Note: Chinese: 傣仂语; pinyin: Dǎilèyǔ; Burmese: လူးရှမ်း, romanized: luu Shan; Lao: ພາສາໄຕລື້; Thai: ภาษาไทลื้อ, romanized: phasa thai lue, pronounced [pʰāː.sǎː.tʰāj.lɯ́ː]; Vietnamese: tiếng Lự or tiếng Lữ; also spelled Tai Lɯ, Tai Lü, Thai Lue, Tai Le), or Xishuangbanna Dai, is a Tai language of the Lu people, spoken by about 700,000 people in Southeast Asia. This includes 280,000 people in China (Yunnan), 200,000 in Burma, 134,000 in Laos, 83,000 in Thailand and 4,960 in Vietnam. The language is similar to other Tai languages and is closely related to Kham Mueang or Tai Yuan, which is also known as Northern Thai language. In Yunnan, it is spoken in all of Xishuangbanna Dai Autonomous Prefecture, as well as Jiangcheng Hani and Yi Autonomous County in Pu'er City.

In Vietnam, Tai Lue speakers are officially recognised as the Lự ethnic minority, although in China they are classified as part of the Dai people, along with speakers of the other Tai languages apart from Zhuang.

== Phonology ==
Tai Lue has 21 syllable-initial consonants, nine syllable-finals and six tones (three different tones in checked syllables, six in open syllables).

=== Consonants ===
==== Initials ====
		Labial	Alveolar	Palatal	Velar		Glottal
		Labial	Alveolar	Palatal	plain	labial	Glottal
Nasal		[m] ᦖ,ᦙ	[n] ᦐ,ᦓ		[ŋ] ᦄ ,ᦇ		
Plosive	tenuis	[p] ᦔ,ᦗ	[t] ᦎ,ᦑ		[k] ᦂ,ᦅ	[kʷ] ᦦ,ᦨ	[ʔ] ᦀ ,ᦁ
Plosive	aspirated	[pʰ] ᦕ,ᦘ	[tʰ] ᦏ,ᦒ				
Plosive	voiced	[b] ᦢ,ᦥ	[d] ᦡ,ᦤ				
Affricate			[t͡s] ᦈ,ᦋ				
Fricative	voiceless	[f] ᦚ,ᦝ	[s] ᦉ,ᦌ		[x] ᦃ,ᦆ	[xʷ] ᦧ,ᦩ	[h] ᦠ,ᦣ
Fricative	voiced	[v] ~ [w] ᦛ,ᦞ					
Approximant		[v] ~ [w] ᦛ,ᦞ	[l] ᦜ,ᦟ	[j] ᦊ,ᦍ			

The initials t͡s- and s- are palatalized before front vowels (which in the language are i, e, and ɛ) and become t͡ɕ- and ɕ-, respectively. For example, /t͡síŋ/ "hard" and /si᷄p/ "ten" are pronounced as [t͡ɕiŋ˥] and [ɕip˧˥] respectively. (Some textbooks denote t͡s as c).

==== Finals ====
	Labial	Alveolar	Palatal	Velar	Glottal
Nasal	[m] ᧄ	[n] ᧃ		[ŋ] ᧂ	
Plosive	[p̚] ᧇ	[t̚] ᧆ		[k̚] ᧅ	[ʔ] ᦰ
Approximant	[w] ᧁ				

=== Vowels ===
Each vowel quality occurs in long-short pairs: these are distinct phonemes forming distinct words in Tai Lue.

Vowel chart showing monophthongs used by many Tai languages, including Tai Lue

	Front		Central-Back		Back	
	short	long	short	long	short	long
Close	[iʔ] ◌ᦲᦰ	[i(ː)] ◌ᦲ	[ɯʔ] ◌ᦹᦰ	[ɯ(ː)] ◌ᦹ	[u(ʔ)] ◌ᦳ	[uː] ◌ᦴ
Mid	[eʔ] ᦵ◌ᦰ	[e(ː)] ᦵ◌	[ɤʔ] ᦵ◌ᦲᦰ	[ɤ(ː)] ᦵ◌ᦲ	[oʔ] ᦷ◌ᦰ	[o(ː)] ᦷ◌
Open	[ɛʔ] ᦶ◌ᦰ	[ɛ(ː)] ᦶ◌	[aʔ] ◌ᦰ	[aː] ◌ᦱ	[ɔʔ] ◌ᦸᦰ	[ɔ(ː)] ◌ᦸ

Generally, vowels in open syllables (without codas) occur as long whereas ones in closed syllables are short (except /aː/ and /uː/).

==== Diphthongs ====
Additionally, Tai Lue uses several diphthongs:

New Tai Lue	IPA
ᦺ◌	[aj]
◌ᦻ	[aːj]
◌ᦼ	[uj]
◌ᦽ	[oj]
◌ᦾ	[ɔj]
◌ᦿ	[ɯj]
ᦵ◌ᧀ	[ɤj]

=== Tones ===
==== Contrastive tones in unchecked syllables ====
The table below presents six phonemic tones in unchecked syllables, i.e. closed syllables ending in sonorant sounds such as [m], [n], [ŋ], [w], and [j] and open syllables. There are six tones for unchecked syllables, although only three are allowed in checked syllables (those ending with -p, -t or -k).

Description	Contour	Transcription	Number	Example	Old Tai Lue	New Tai Lue script	Meaning
high	55	á	1	/káː/	ᨠᩣ	ᦂᦱ	crow
low rising	13	a᷅	3	/ka᷅ː/	ᨠᩢᩣ	ᦂᦱᧉ	rice shoots
high rising	35	a᷄	5	/ka᷄ː/	ᨠ᩵ᩣ	ᦂᦱᧈ	to go
falling	51	â	2	/kâː/	ᨣᩤ	ᦅᦱ	to be stuck
low	11	à	4	/kàː/	ᨣᩢᩤ	ᦅᦱᧉ	to do business
mid	33	a (not marked)	6	/kaː/	ᨣ᩵ᩤ	ᦅᦱᧈ	price

==== Contrastive tones in checked syllables ====
The table below presents two phonemic tones in checked syllables, i.e. closed syllables ending in a glottal stop [ʔ] and obstruent sounds which are [p], [t], and [k].

Tone	Contour	Number	Example	New Tai Lue	Phonemic	Meaning
high	55	7	ᩉᩖᩢᨠ	ᦜᧅ	/lák/	post
high-risinɡ	35	9	ᩉᩖᩣ᩠ᨠ	ᦜᦱᧅᧈ	/la᷄ːk/	differ from others
mid	33	8	ᩃᩢ᩠ᨠ	ᦟᧅ	/lāk/	steal

== Grammar ==
=== Pronouns ===
		Singular Familiar	Singular	Deferential	Plural Familiar	Plural	Deferential
1st person	exclusive	ᦕᦴᧉᦃᦱᧉ ᨹᩪᩢᨡᩢᩣ pʰuu3xaa3	ᦃᦱᧉ ᨡᩢᩣ xaa3	ᦃᦱᧉᦓᦾᧉ ᨡᩢᩣᨶᩢᩭ xaa3nɔj6	–	ᦎᦴ ᨲᩪ tuu1	ᦎᦴᦃᦾᧉ ᨲᩪᨡᩢᩭ tuu1xɔj3
1st person	inclusive	ᦕᦴᧉᦃᦱᧉ ᨹᩪᩢᨡᩢᩣ pʰuu3xaa3	ᦃᦱᧉ ᨡᩢᩣ xaa3	ᦃᦱᧉᦓᦾᧉ ᨡᩢᩣᨶᩢᩭ xaa3nɔj6	–	ᦣᧁ ᩁᩮᩢᩣ haw4	–
2nd person		ᦈᧁᧉᦙᧃ ᨧᩮᩢᩢᩣᨾᩢ᩠ᨶ caw3man4	ᦆᦲᧂ ᨤᩥ᩠ᨦ xiŋ4	ᦎᦳᧃᦈᧁᧉ ᨲᩫ᩠ᨶᨧᩮᩢᩢᩣ tun1caw3	ᦉᦴ ᩈᩪ suu1	ᦉᦴᦑᦱᧃᧈ ᩈᩪᨴ᩵ᩤ᩠ᨶ suu1taan5	–
3rd person		ᦎᦳᧃᦑᦱᧃᧈ ᨲᩫ᩠ᨶᨴ᩵ᩤ᩠ᨶ tun1taan5	ᦙᧃ ᨾᩢ᩠ᨶ man4	–	ᦎᦳᧃᦑᦱᧃᧈ ᨲᩫ᩠ᨶᨴ᩵ᩤ᩠ᨶ tun1taan5	ᦃᧁ ᨡᩮᩢᩣ xaw1	ᦃᧁᦈᧁᧉ ᨡᩮᩢᩣᨧᩮᩢ᩶ᩣ xaw1caw3

=== Syntax ===
Word order is usually subject–verb–object (SVO); modifiers (e.g. adjectives) follow nouns.

=== Interrogatives ===
Word	Meaning
ᦉᧂ (saŋ1)	What
ᦌᦹ (sɯɯ4)	Why
ᦂᦲᧈ (kii1)	How many
ᦺᦕ (pʰaj1)	Who
ᦺᦐ (naj1)	Where

== Vocabulary ==
As in Thai and Lao, Tai Lue has borrowed many Sanskrit and Pali words and affixes. Among the Tai languages in general, Tai Lue has limited intelligibility with Shan and Tai Nua and shares much vocabulary with, the other Southwestern Tai languages. Tai Lue has 95% lexical similarity with Northern Thai (Lanna), 86% with Central Thai, 93% with Shan, and 95% with Khun.

Below, some Thai Lue words are given with standard Central Thai equivalents for comparison. Thai words are shown on the left and Tai Lue words, written in Tai Tham script, are shown on the right.

=== Different words ===
Many words differ from Thai greatly:

- ยี่สิบ → ᨪᩣ᩠ᩅ (/jîː sìp/ → /sâːw/, twenty; cf. Lao: /sáːw/, Northern Thai: /sāw/)
- พูด → ᩋᩪᩢ (/pʰûːt/ → /ʔu᷅ː/, to speak; cf. Northern Thai: /ʔu᷇ː/)
- พี่ชาย → ᩋᩢᩣ᩠ᨿ (/pʰîː t͡ɕʰaːj/ → /ʔa᷅ːj/, older brother; cf. Lao: /ʔâːj/, Northern Thai: /ʔa᷇ːj/)

=== Similar words ===
Some words differ in tone only:

- หนึ่ง → ᨶ᩠ᨦᩧ᩵ (/nɯŋ/, one)
- หก → ᩉᩫ᩠ᨠ (/hók/, six)
- เจ็ด → ᨧᩮ᩠ᨯ (/t͡ɕét/, seven)
- สิบ → ᩈᩥ᩠ᨷ (/síp/, ten)
- กิน → ᨠᩥ᩠ᨶ (/kín/, to eat)

Some words differ in a single sound and associated tone. In many words, the initial ร (/r/) in Thai is ฮ (/h/) in Tai Lue, as is also the case in Lao and Tai Yuan:

- ร้อน → ᩁᩢᩬᩁ (/rɔ́n/ → /hɔ̀n/, hot; cf. Lao: /hɔ̂n/, Northern Thai: /hɔ́ːn/)
- รัก → ᩁᩢ᩠ᨠ (/rák/ → /hak/, to love; cf. Lao: /hāk/, Northern Thai: /ha᷇k/)
- รู้ → ᩁᩪᩢ (/rúː/ → /hùː/, to know; cf. Lao: /hûː/, Northern Thai: /húː/)

Aspirated consonants in the low-class consonant group(อักษรต่ำ /ʔàk sɔ̌n tàm/) become unaspirated:

- เชียงราย → ᨩ᩠ᨿᨦᩁᩣ᩠ᨿ (/t͡ɕʰiaŋ raːj/ → /t͡ɕêŋ hâːj/, Chiang Rai city and province)
- คิด → ᨣᩧ᩠ᨯ (/kʰít/ → /kɯt/, to think; cf. Northern Thai: /kɯ́t/)
- พ่อ → ᨻᩳ᩵ (/pʰɔ̂/ → /pɔ/, father; cf. Northern Thai: /pɔ̂ː/)
- ทาง → ᨴᩤ᩠ᨦ (/tʰaːŋ/ → /tâːŋ/, way; cf. Northern Thai: /tāːŋ/)

(Note that the vowels also differ greatly between Tai Lue and Thai in many words, even though they are etymologically related and share the same root.)

Though many aspirated consonants often become unaspirated, when an unaspirated consonant is followed by ร (/r/) the unaspirated consonant becomes aspirated:

- ประเทศ → ᨷᩕᨴᩮ᩠ᩆ (/praʔtʰêːt/ → /pʰaʔtêːt/, country; cf. Northern Thai /pʰa.têːt/)

Other differences:

- ให้ → ᩉᩨᩢ (/hâj/ → /hɯ᷅/, to give, let)

=== Numbers ===
0	᧐	ᦉᦳᧃ		sun^{1}
1	᧚	ᦓᦹᧂᧈ	ᨶᩧ᩠᩵ᨦ	nɯŋ^{6}
2	᧒	ᦉᦸᧂ	ᩈᩬᨦ	sɔŋ^{1}
3	᧓	ᦉᦱᧄ	ᩈᩣ᩠ᨾ	sam^{1}
4	᧔	ᦉᦲᧈ	ᩈᩦ᩵	siː^{5}
5	᧕	ᦠᦱᧉ	ᩉᩢᩣ	haː^{3}
6	᧖	ᦷᦠᧅ	ᩉᩫ᩠ᨠ	hok^{7}
7	᧗	ᦵᦈᧆ	ᨧᩮ᩠ᨯ	t͡ɕet^{7}
8	᧘	ᦶᦔᧆᧈ	ᨸᩯ᩠ᨯ	pɛt^{9}
9	᧙	ᦂᧁᧉ	ᨠᩮᩢᩢᩣ	kaw^{3}
10	᧚᧐	ᦉᦲᧇ	ᩈᩥ᩠ᨷ	sip^{7}
20	᧒᧐	ᦌᦱᧁ	ᨪᩣ᩠ᩅ	saːw^{2}
100	᧚᧐᧐	ᦣᦾᧉ	ᩁᩢᩭ	hɔi^{4}
1,000	᧚᧐᧐᧐	ᦗᧃ	ᨻᩢ᩠ᨶ	pan^{2}
10,000	᧚᧐᧐᧐᧐	ᦖᦹᧃᧈ	ᩉ᩠ᨾᩨ᩵ᩁ	mɯn^{5}
100,000	᧚᧐᧐᧐᧐᧐	ᦶᦉᧃ	ᩈᩯ᩠ᨶ	sɛn^{1}
1,000,000	᧚᧐᧐᧐᧐᧐᧐	ᦟᦱᧃᧉ	ᩃᩢᩣ᩠ᨶ	lan^{4}

== Writing systems ==
Tai Lue is written in three different scripts. One is the Fak Kham script, a variety of the Thai script of Sukhothai. The second is the Tham script, which was reformed in the 1950s, but is still in use and has recently regained government support. The new script is a simplified version of the old script.

=== Fak Kham ===
Fak Kham is an ancient script, also used in Kengtung, Northern Thailand and Northern Laos centuries ago.

=== Tham ===
The Tham script is called 老傣文 lao dai wen (Old Dai script) in Chinese. It is readable by most people in Burma, Laos, Thailand and Vietnam.

=== New Tai Lue ===
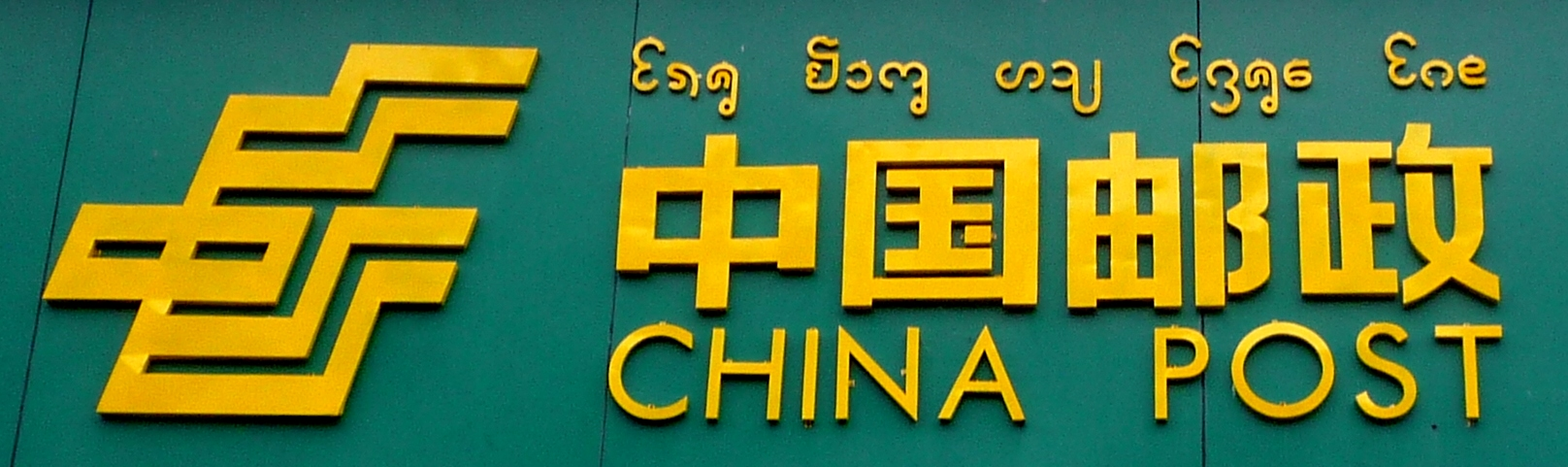
China Post logo with the New Tai Lue script in Mohan, Yunnan

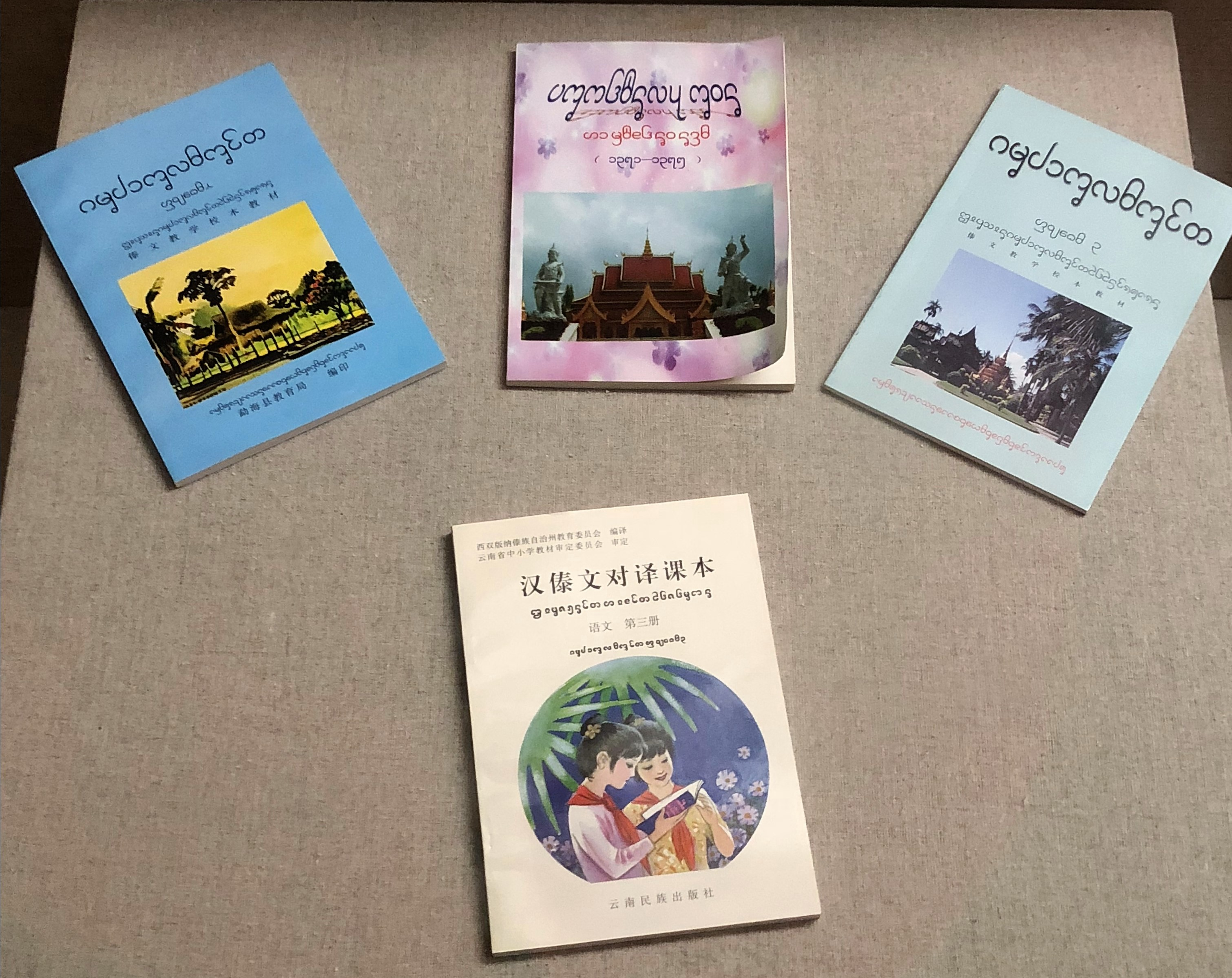
Books printed in New Tai Lue alphabet

New Tai Lue is a modernization of the Lanna alphabet (also known as the Tai Tham script), which is similar to the Thai alphabet, and consists of 42 initial consonant signs (21 high-tone class, 21 low-tone class), seven final consonant signs, 16 vowel signs, two tone letters and one vowel shortening letter (or syllable-final glottal stop). Vowels signs can be placed before or after the syllable initial consonant.

Similar to the Thai alphabet, the pronunciation of the tone of a syllable depends on the class the initial consonant belongs to, syllable structure and vowel length, and the tone mark.

== Related varieties ==
The Bajia people (八甲人), who number 1,106 individuals in Mengkang Village (勐康村), Meng'a Town (勐阿镇), Menghai County, Yunnan, speak a language closely related to Tai Lue. There are 225 Bajia people living in Jingbo Township 景播乡, Menghai County (You 2013:270). The Bajia are also known as the Chinese Dai 汉傣.

== See also ==
- Tai Nüa language
- Tai Dam language
