= Akha language =

Loloish language spoken in Southeast Asia

Akha
- Aqkaq dawq
- Native to: Myanmar, China, Laos, Thailand, Vietnam
- Ethnicity: Akha
- Native speakers: 620,000 (2007–2015)
- Language family: Sino-Tibetan: Tibeto-Burman; Lolo–Burmese; Loloish; Southern; Hanoid; Akha
- Dialects: Akha (Thailand Akha); Hani Akha (Chinese Akha) Xishuangbanna Hani (Vietnamese Akha); Lao Sung (Laotian Akha); Kaw (Burmese Akha)
- Writing system: Various, including English Script s

Language codes
- ISO 639-3: ahk
- Glottolog: akha1245

Akha is the language spoken by the Akha people of southern China (Yunnan Province), eastern Burma (Shan State), northern Laos, and northern Thailand.

Western scholars group Akha, Hani and Honi into the Hani languages, treating all three as separate mutually unintelligible, but closely related, languages. The Hani languages are, in turn, classified in the Southern Loloish subgroup of Loloish. The Loloish languages are closely related to Burmish languages and are grouped within Tibeto-Burman as the Lolo-Burmese languages.

In accordance with China's official classification of ethnic groups, which groups all speakers of Hani languages into one ethnicity, Chinese linguists consider all Hani languages, including Akha, to be dialects of a single language.

Speakers of Akha live in remote mountainous areas where it has developed into a wide-ranging dialect continuum. Dialects from villages separated by as little as ten kilometers may show marked differences. The isolated nature of Akha communities has also resulted in several villages with divergent dialects. Dialects from extreme ends of the continuum and the more divergent dialects are mutually unintelligible.

== Phonology ==
The Akha language, along with the dialect spoken in Alu village, 55 kilometres (34 mi) northwest of Chiang Rai city in Chiang Rai Province, Thailand, is described below. Katsura conducted his study during the late 1960s. With a population of 400 it was, at the time, one of the largest Akha villages in Northern Thailand and was still growing as a result of cross-border migration from Burma. The Akha in Alu spoke no Standard Thai and communicated with outsiders using either Lahu Na or Shan.

Standard Akha has 25 or 26 consonants, and the Alu dialect has 23 or 24 consonants depending on how the syllabic nasal is analyzed. The /m̩/, realized variously as [ˀm] or [m̥], can be analyzed as a separate single consonant or as sequences of /ʔm/ and /hm/. Katsura chose the latter but listed the /m/ component of the syllabic consonant with the vowels.

Consonant phonemes
		Labial		Alveolar		Alveolo- palatal	Velar	Glottal
		plain	pal.	plain	pal.	Alveolo- palatal	Velar	Glottal
Nasal		m	mʲ	n	nʲ		ŋ	
Stop	tenuis	p	pʲ	t			k	ʔ (Note: /ʔ/ is only heard initially within the absence of a consonant before a vowel)
Stop	voiced	b	bʲ	d			ɡ	
Affricate	tenuis			ts		tɕ		
Affricate	voiced			dz		dʑ		
Fricative	tenuis			s		ɕ	x	h
Fricative	voiced			z		ʑ	ɣ	
Approximant				l				

Consonant phonemes in the Alu dialect
		Labial	Alveolar	Palatal	Velar	Glottal
Nasal		m	n	ɲ	ŋ	
Stop	tenuis	p	t	c	k	ʔ (Note: Akha /ʔ/ is often described as glottal "tension" rather than a true stop)
Stop	aspirate	pʰ	tʰ	cʰ	kʰ	
Stop	voiced	b	d	ɟ	ɡ	
Fricative	tenuis		s		x	h
Fricative	voiced				ɣ	
Approximant			l	j		

Any consonant may begin a syllable, but native Akha syllables which don't end in a vowel may only end in either -m or -ɔŋ. A few loan words have been noted that end in -aŋ or -aj. In the case of a nasal coda, some vowels become nasalized. Alu Akha distinguishes ten vowel qualities, contrasting rounded and unrounded back vowels at three heights while only the mid front vowels contrast roundness.

Vowel phonemes
	Front		Central	Back	
	unrounded	rounded	Central	unrounded	rounded
Close	i	y		ɯ	u
Mid	e	ø	ə		o
Open	ɛ		a	ɑ	ɔ

Vowel phonemes in the Alu dialect
	Front		Back	
	unrounded	rounded	unrounded	rounded
Close	i		ɯ	u
Mid	e	ø	ə	o
Open	ɛ		a	ɔ

Three vowels, /u/, /ɔ/ and /ɯ/, show marked nasalization when followed by a nasal consonant becoming /ũ/, /ɔ̃/ and /ɯ̃/, respectively.

Tone phonemes
High
Mid
Low

There are three tones: high, mid and low. Laryngealized vowels commonly occur with mid and low tone, but only rarely with high tone (mostly in loan words and personal names). There are no contour tones. Syllabic [m̩] occurs with all three plain tones and laryngealized with the two common tones.

== Grammar ==
Like many other Tibeto-Burman languages, the basic word order of Akha is agent-object-verb (SOV). It is a topic-prominent language where the marking of agents are not obligatory and the noun phrase is often topicalized. Also, serial verb constructions and sentence-final particles are frequently used in the sentences.

=== Noun phrase ===
The basic order of the Akha noun phrase is noun-adjective-demonstrative-pronoun-numeral-classifier. Grammatical relations and semantic roles may be marked by postpositional particles.

=== Evidentiality and egophoricity ===
Some of the Akha sentence-final particles mark evidentiality and/or egophoricity. For instance, the particle ŋá expresses inference from what the speaker saw.

In interrogative sentences, má or mɛ́ is used for confirmation; the same particles in the answer express information that the speaker knows for sure.

Nawr aqkaq malor?
"Are you an Akha?"

Ngar aqkaq ma.
"Yes, I am."

Aqyawf aqkaq maelor?
"Is he an Akha?"

aqyawf aqkaq mae.
"Yes, he is."

Note that má appears in the second-person question and the first-person declarative while mɛ́ is used otherwise.

== Varieties ==
=== Laos ===
The table below lists the Akha varieties surveyed in Kingsada (1999), Shintani (2001), and Kato (2008), with autonyms and informant birthplaces given as well. All locations are in Phongsaly Province, northern Laos.

Akha varieties of Phongsaly Province, northern Laos
Dialect	Autonym	Locations	Source
Ko-Pala	pa˧la˧ tsʰɔ˥ja˩	Sen Kham village, Khua District, Phongsaly Province	Kingsada (1999)
Ko-Oma	kɔ˧ ɔ˥ma˩	Nana village, Phongsaly District, Phongsaly Province	Kingsada (1999)
Ko-Phuso	kɔ˧ pʰɯ˥sɔ˧	Phapung Kao village, Bun Neua District, Phongsaly Province	Kingsada (1999)
Ko-Puli	a˩kʰa˩ pu˧li˩	Culaosaen Kao village, Bun Tay District, Phongsaly Province	Kingsada (1999)
Ko-Chipia	a˩kʰa˩ cɛ˩pja˩	Sano Kao village, Bun Tay District, Phongsaly Province	Kingsada (1999)
Ko-Eupa	ɯ˨˩pa˨˩	Cabe village, Bun Tay District, Phongsaly Province	Shintani (2001)
Ko-Nyaü	a˩kʰa˩ ɲa˩ɯ˥	Huayphot village, Khua District, Phongsaly Province	Shintani (2001)
Ko-Luma	lu˨˩ma˨˩	Lasamay village, Samphan District, Phongsaly Province	Shintani (2001)
Akha Nukui	a˨˩kʰa˨˩, nu˨˩ɣø˨˩ a˨˩kʰa˨˩	Kungci village, Nyot U District, Phongsaly Province	Kato (2008)
Akha Chicho	-	Ban Pasang village, Muang Sing district, Luang Namtha Province	Hayashi (2018)

Akha Chicho, spoken in Ban Pasang village, Muang Sing district, Luang Namtha Province, is documented in Hayashi (2018). Hayashi (2018: 8) reports that Akha Chicho is mutually intelligible with Akha Buli. Nearby, Akha Kopien (also known as Botche) is spoken in another part of Muang Sing District, Luang Namtha Province, Laos. Some Akha Kopien words are as follows.

Gloss	Akha Kopien/Botche
sun	nɤŋ˥ma˧
moon	ba˧la˧
water	u˥tɕṵ˨˩
fire	mi˨˩dza˨˩
tiger	xa˨˩la˨˩
buffalo	a˨˩ȵo˨˩
road	ga˥ko˥
light (adj.)	jɔ˧pʰja˧
crow	o̰˨˩a̰˨˩
duck	dʑi˧dʑi˧
bird	tɕḭ˧ja̰˧
tamarind	ma˧xa˥a˥bḛ˧
hot	a˨˩lo˥
new	a˨˩ɕḭ˨˩
rain	o̰˨˩ta̰˨˩
now	ȵa˨˩ŋ̍˥
what	a˨˩pa˨˩
one	tɤ̰˧
two	n̩˧
three	se˥
four	li˧
five	ŋa˧
six	ko̰˧
seven	ɕḭ˧
eight	jḛ˧
nine	dʑø˨˩
ten	tsɤ˥

There are 15 Akha subgroups in Phongsaly Province, with autonyms given in parentheses.

- Chicho (Akha)
- Chipia (Akha)
- Eupa (Akha)
- Nukui (Akha)
- Nyaeu (Akha)
- Oma (Akha)
- Puli (Akha)
- Kofe (Boche)
- Luma (Luma, Loma)
- Muteun (Moteu)
- Kongsat (Suma)
- Muchi (Wanyeu)
- Phusang (Paza)
- Pana
- Khir

=== China ===
In Jinghong City and Menghai County, the two major Hani subgroups are Jiuwei 鸠为 and Jizuo 吉坐. The Jizuo 吉坐 are the largest Hani ethnic subgroup in Jinghong.

The Jiuwei claim to have migrated from Honghe and Mojiang. The Jiuwei live in various villages in Jinghong, including:

- Mengbozhai 勐波寨, Menghan Town 勐罕寨, Jinghong City
- Agupu 阿古普 (also called Manwoke 曼窝科) in Leiwu 类吴, Mengsong Township 勐宋, Jinghong City
- Napazhai 那帕寨 in Damenglong 大勐笼, Jinghong City
- Baiya village 拜牙村 in Menghun 勐混, Menghai County (The Ake 阿克 subgroup lives in Lougu 楼固村, located in Menghun 勐混 as well.)
- Babingzhai 坝丙寨, Xidingshan 西定山, Menghai County

There are also ethnic Hani that are locally called Aini 爱尼 living in 7 villages on Nanlin Mountain 南林山 of southwestern Jinghong, namely Manbage 曼八阁, Manjinglong 曼景龙, Manjingnan 曼景囡, Mangudu 曼固独, Manbaqi 曼把奇, Manbasan 曼巴伞, and Manjingmai 曼景卖.

== Writing systems ==
Numerous writing systems exist for Akha, including various Latin-based scripts, the Burmese and Thai scripts. Akha was unwritten until Christian missionaries created various Latin-based writing systems during the 20th century. The first documented transcription system for Akha was devised in 1927 by Father Portaluppi, an Italian missionary, in Kengtung, Burma. The most commonly used system is a Latin-based script called the "Baptist script," which was invented by Paul Lewis in 1950. In August 2008, Akha delegates from China, Myanmar, Laos, Thailand, and Vietnam agreed to develop a common Latin-based orthography for the language.

== See also ==
- Akha comparative vocabulary list (Wiktionary)
