= Phongsaly province =

Province of Laos

Phongsaly province ແຂວງ ຜົ້ງສາລີ
- Province
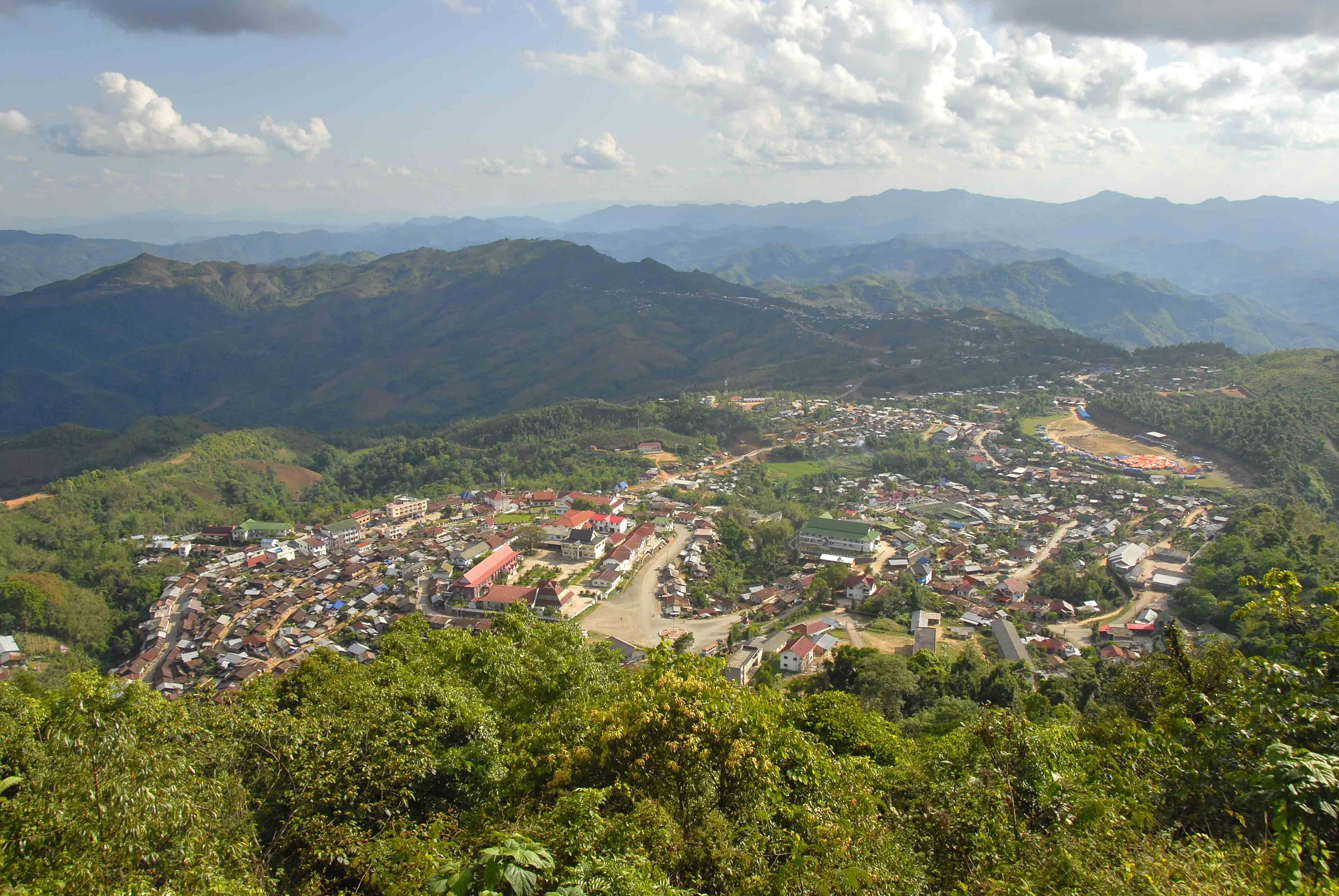
- Phongsaly, the capital city

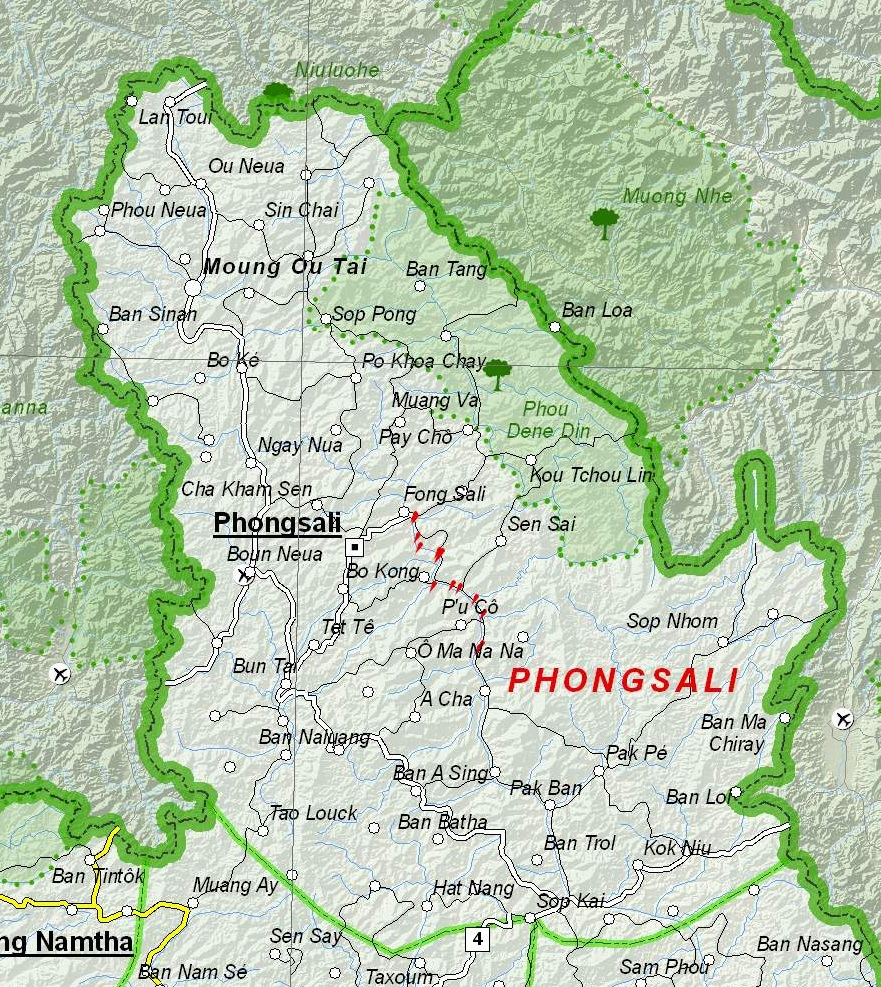
- Map of Phôngsali province

- Location of Phongsaly province in Laos
- Coordinates: 21.683333°N 102.1°E
- Country: Laos
- Capital: Phôngsali

Area
  - Total: 16,270 km^{2} (6,280 sq mi)

Population (2020 census)
  - Total: 193,145
  - Density: 11.87/km^{2} (30.75/sq mi)
- Time zone: UTC+7 (ICT)
- ISO 3166 code: LA-PH
- HDI (2022): 0.555 medium · 15th

Phongsaly province (Lao ຜົ້ງສາລີ), also spelled Phôngsali, is a province of Laos in the extreme north of the country. The capital of the province is the city of Phôngsali. Phongsaly is between Yunnan (China), and Điện Biên province in Vietnam. Its culture has been historically influenced by China.

Phongsaly province covers an area of 16,270 square kilometres (6,280 sq mi), of which 77% has forest cover. It borders China to the north and west, Vietnam to the east, Luang Prabang province to the south, and Oudomxai province to the southwest. The highest mountain in the province is Phou Doychy with an elevation of 1,842 metres (6,043 ft). Protected areas in the province include the Phou Dene Din National Biodiversity Conservation Area and Nam Lan Conservation Area.

== Geography ==
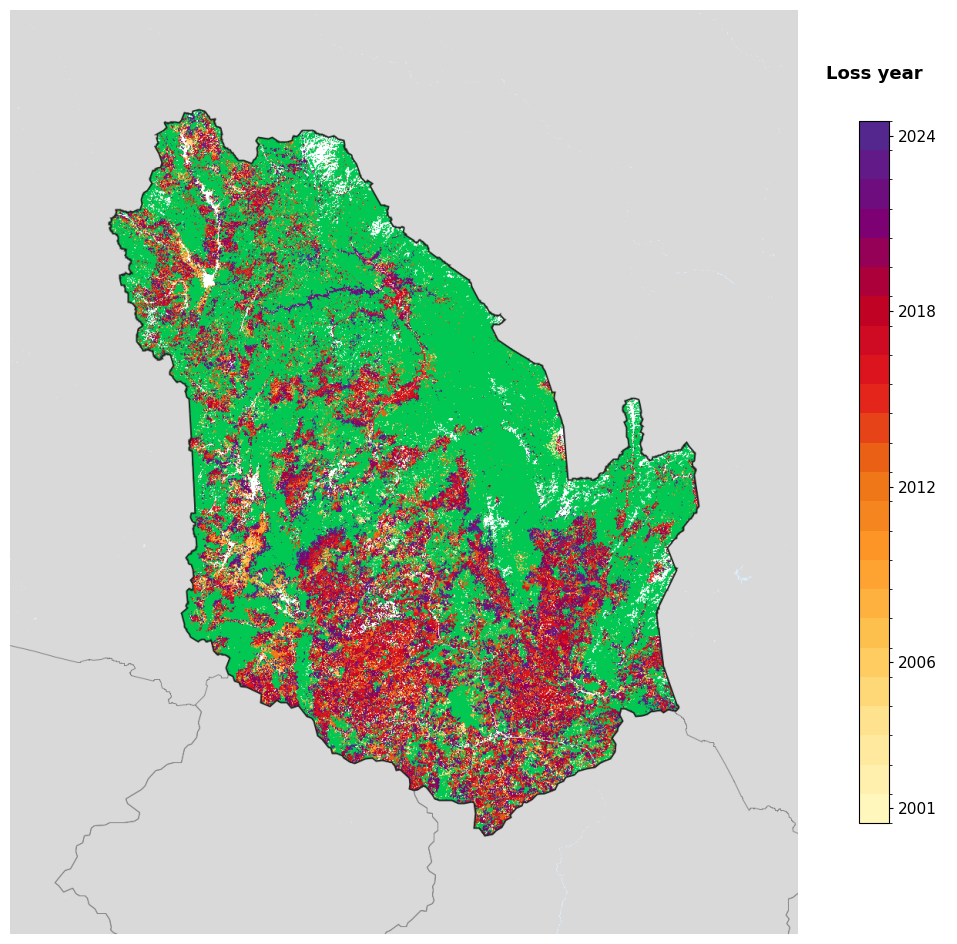
Tree-cover loss year in Phongsaly, 2001-2024, from the Global Forest Change dataset.

Phongsaly province covers an area of 16,270 square kilometres (6,280 sq mi), out of which 77% has forest cover. The province borders China to the north and west, Vietnam to the east, Luang Prabang province to the south, and Oudomxai province to the southwest. It is located in the mountains, approximately 450–1,800 metres (1,480–5,910 ft) above sea level. The highest mountain in the province is Phou Doychy with an elevation of 1,842 metres (6,043 ft). The Phou Fa hill, at 1,625 metres (5,331 ft), is near the capital city and has road access to the top from where vistas of the city are visible. The top of the mountain is approached by 431 steps. Because of economic commerce with China, portions of the province have been deforested.

Weather in the province is described as "four seasons in a single day" with cold mornings and evenings, humidity during the day, and rains in the afternoon, which has created lush green forests.

=== Protected areas ===
Areas of the province's forests in Phou Den Din NBCA have no human habitation.

The 126,880 hectare Phou Dendin Important Bird Area (IBA) is located within the 222,000 hectare Phou Den Din NBCA. The IBA altitude varies between 500–1,900 metres (1,600–6,200 ft) above sea level. Topographical elements include the Nam Ou River and its catchment, the area at the confluence of the Nam Khang River, mountainous terrain, and slopes. The habitat is characterized by unbroken dry evergreen forest and inland wetlands. Avifauna includes Blyth's kingfisher (Alcedo hercules), brown dipper (Cinclus pallasii), brown hornbill (Anorrhinus tickelli), crested kingfisher (Megaceryle lugubris), great hornbill (Buceros bicornis), lesser fish eagle (Ichthyophaga humilis), and rufous-necked hornbill (Aceros nipalensis).

=== Administrative divisions ===
The province is made up of the following districts (mueang):

Map	Code	Name	Lao script	Population (2015)
	02-01	Phongsaly District	ຜົ້ງສາລີ	23,337
	02-02	May District	ໃໝ່	26,361
	02-03	Khoua District	ຂວາ	26,164
	02-04	Samphanh District	ສຳພັນ	24,420
	02-05	Boun Neua District	ບຸນເໜືອ	22,285
	02-06	Yot Ou District	ຍອດອູ	31,145
	02-07	Boun Tay District	ບຸນໃຕ້	24,277

The northernmost district of the province is Yot Ou, which has a population of 31,000 spread over 98 villages made up of 11 ethnic groups. The majority of the people are farmers. The Lao-Chinese Border Checkpoint is at Lan Tui, which is designated by landmark No. 7.

== History ==
The Phunoi left Muang Sing or Burma and arrived in Phongsaly at the end of the 18th century. The Hmong settled in Phongsaly at the end of the 19th century, having migrated from southern China. Between 1908 and 1910, the Tai Lue conducted a revolt against colonial authority. When it ended, the colonial military assumed full authority in Phongsaly. In 1936, Sithon Kommadam and his brother, Kamphanh were jailed in Phongsaly because of their participation in their father's (Ong Kommandam) 1934–1936 armed revolt against the French. After Sithon's release in 1945, he established resistance bases in Phongsaly, later making contact with the Viet Minh. The Communists came into power in 1954 in the province; within 6 years, the Phunoy began experiencing Buddhist religious purges. Subsequent to the 1954 Geneva Accords, Communist Pathet Lao forces in Phongsaly province were provided with regrouping zones. Phongsaly was integrated into the Royal Lao Government on 18 December 1957.

== Demographics ==
The population of the province is 177,989 as of the 2015 census. There are 13 minority ethnic groups with independent language and culture identity: Khammu, Thai Dam, Thai Daeng, Yao, Leu, Ho (Hani), Hmong, Akha, Yang, Bid, Lolo and others. Each group has its own practices in respect to marriage customs, specific handicrafts, silverware and jewelry.

=== Languages ===
Other than the national language Lao, minority languages are spoken in Phongsaly province, most of which belong to the Tai (Kra-Dai), Hanoish (Tibeto-Burman), and Khmuic (Austroasiatic) branches. The table below lists the languages surveyed in Kingsada (1999), Shintani (2001), and Kato (2008), with autonyms and informant birthplaces given. All languages are spoken in Phongsaly province unless indicated otherwise.

Languages of Phongsaly
Language	Autonym	Branch	Locations	Source
Lü	taj31 lɯ13	Tai	U Neua village	Kingsada (1999)
Yang	jaŋ13	Tai	Long Ngai Kao village, Bun Tay District	Kingsada (1999)
Tai Nä	taj53 nə35	Tai	Lantui village, Nyot U District	Shintani (2001)
Tai Lam	kon55 taj55 lam22	Tai	Huayhok village, Nambak District, Luangphabang province	Shintani (2001)
Phunoi of Phongxaly	phu21 noiʔ44	Phunoi	Phongxaly town, Phongxaly District	Kingsada (1999)
Phunoi of Bun Tay	phu21 noi44 (bɑ21)	Phunoi	Langne village, Bun Tay District	Kingsada (1999)
Phongku	phɔŋ33 ku55 bɔ11	Phunoi	Phongku Long, Bun Tay District	Kingsada (1999)
Lao-Pan	law33 pan11 ba11	Phunoi	Phaophumuang village, Bun Tay District	Kingsada (1999)
Lao-Seng	lao21 sɛŋ21	Phunoi	Chaho village, Bun Tay District	Kingsada (1999)
Laoseng	kha55	Phunoi	Namnat village, Nyot U District	Kato (2008)
Pisu (Lao-Phai)	pi33 su44	Phunoi	Phudokcham village, Phongxaly District	Kingsada (1999)
Phu-Lawa	phɔŋ33 ku55	Phunoi	Phongkulong village, Bun Tay District	Shintani (2001)
Phongset	phoŋ33 set55	Phunoi	Phongset village, Bun Neua District	Shintani (2001)
Phunyot	phu21 ɲɔt11	Phunoi	Namkang village, Namo District, Oudomxai province	Kato (2008)
Ko-Pala	pa33 la33 tshɔ55 ja11	Akha	Sen Kham village, Khua District	Kingsada (1999)
Ko-Oma	kɔ33 ɔ55 ma11	Akha	Nana village, Phongxaly District	Kingsada (1999)
Ko-Phuso	kɔ33 phɯ55 sɔ33	Akha	Phapung Kao village, Bun Neua District	Kingsada (1999)
Ko-Puli	a11 kha11 pu33 li11	Akha	Culaosaen Kao village, Bun Tay District	Kingsada (1999)
Ko-Chipia	a11 kha11 cɛ11 pja11	Akha	Sano Kao village, Bun Tay District	Kingsada (1999)
Ko-Eupa	ɯ21 pa21	Akha	Cabe village, Bun Tay District	Shintani (2001)
Ko-Nyaü	a11 kha11 ɲa11 ɯ55	Akha	Huayphot village, Khua District	Shintani (2001)
Ko-Luma	lu21 ma21	Akha	Lasamay village, Samphan District	Shintani (2001)
Sida (Sila)	go55 ɯ55 a11 ma11	Akha	Chaohoi village, Nyot U District; Phongsai village, Bun Neua District	Kingsada (1999)
Sida	si33 la33	Akha	Longthang village, Nyot U District; Sida village, Luang Namtha District, Luang Namtha province	Shintani (2001)
Sila	ko55 ɯ21	Akha	Namsing village, Nyot U District	Kato (2008)
Wanyä (Muchi)	wa11 ɲə11	Akha	Ipoeching village, Bun Tay District	Shintani (2001)
Hani	ha21ɲi21	Akha	Sikaoho village, Nyot U District	Kato (2008)
Akha Nukui	a21kha21, nu21ɣø21 a21kha21	Akha	Kungci village, Nyot U District	Kato (2008)
Muteun	mɔ21 tɯ21	Other Loloish	Hunapha village, Namo District, Oudomxai province	Kato (2008)
Khongsat	su55 ma33	Other Loloish	Sutko village, Namo District, Oudomxai province	Kato (2008)
Khir	la21 ja21	Other Loloish	Kang village, Nyot U District	Kato (2008)
Phusang	pa33 za33	Other Loloish	Phusangkao village, Samphan District	Kato (2008)
Lolo	lo21 lo33 pho21	Other Loloish	-	Kato (2008)
Khabit	khaa bet	Khmuic	Nale village, Bun Neua District	Kingsada (1999)
Khmu	kh(ə)m̥muʔ	Khmuic	Tangkok village, Khua District	Kingsada (1999)
Then	pram thɛɛn	Khmuic	Then Sa village, Wiangkham District, Luangphabang province	Shintani (2001)
Ho (Han-Chinese)	xan13 tshu11	Sinitic	Wat Keo village, Phongxaly District	Kingsada (1999)

== Economy ==
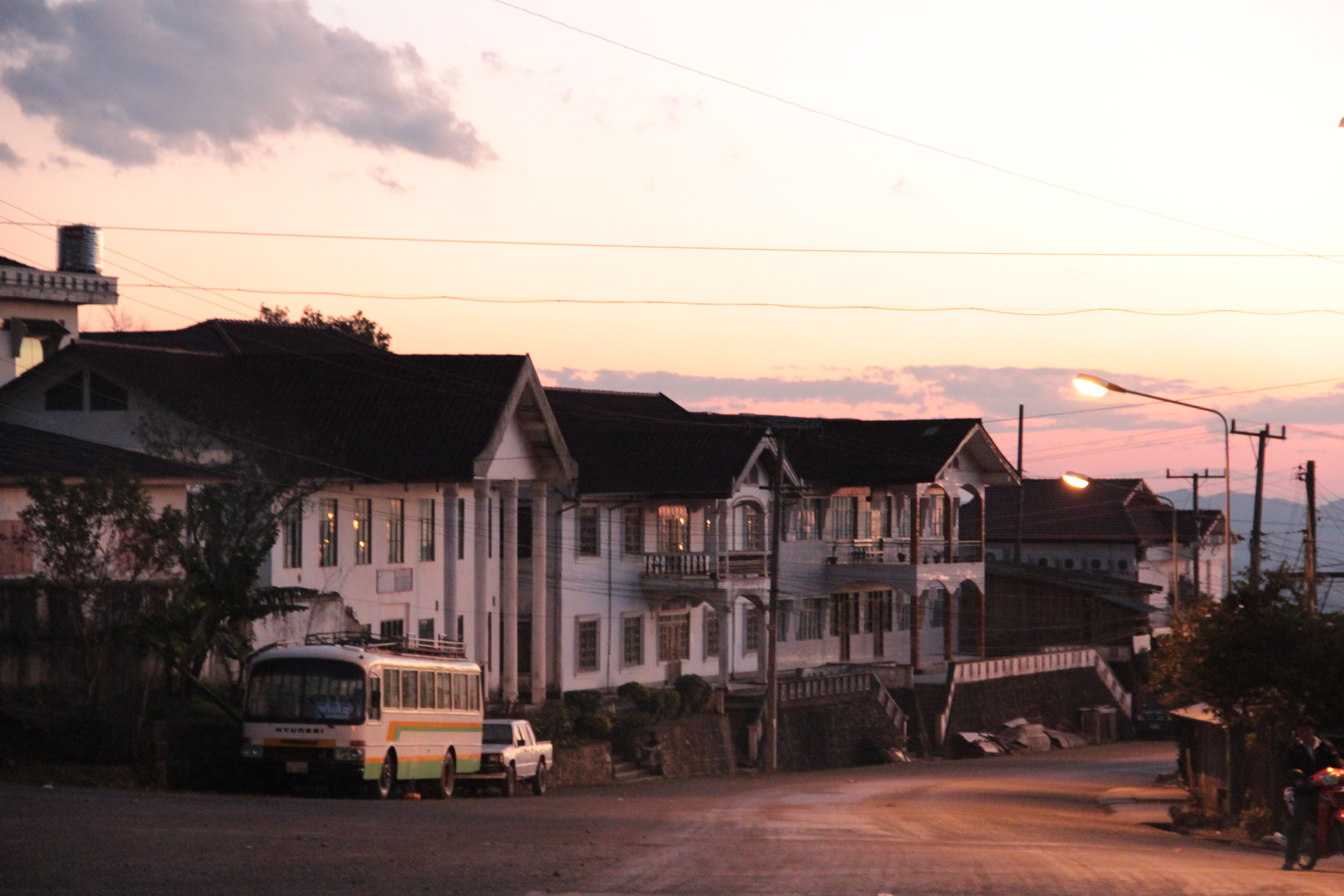
Street in Phongsali

Phôngsali is the primary trade gateway between Laos and China, exporting lumber and importing types of finished goods. There are Chinese manufacturing companies in the province, along with other foreign investment.

As an economic activity 24 villages have been identified to install mini hydro-power projects with pico-turbines to provide electric supply utilizing the hydro power potential of the hilly areas which have monsoon rainfall. Local material will be used for construction of civil works and villagers trained to plan, implement and operate the units including maintenance of all components of the project covering transmission lines. The objective is to reduce poverty among the rural poor of the remote villages. The project is proposed for implementation at a cost of Euro 210,000 with 48% financing by the Energy and Environment Partnership (EEP)of Mekong with Electriciens Sand Frontieres as lead partner. The project is slated for implementation over a 20 months period.

In order to reduce the addiction to opium, the United Nations Organization on Drugs and Crime (UNODC) introduced the Phongsaly Alternative Development Fund Project for Opium Elimination and the LAOK46 Phongsaly Alternative Livelihood and Food Security Project (PALAFS)]] covering 30 villages in Khoua and Mai districts, and minimise opium addiction in 60 villages in Samphan district, through alternative development activities. During the final years of the 20th century, 3,872 ha of the province had opium poppy cultivation (20% of the national total production) with 513 villages out of 611 growing opium with an addiction rate of 5.6%. Phongsaly has the maximum number of districts below the poverty line.

== Landmarks ==
Landmarks in the province are the Wat Ou-Tai Temple, the Wat Luang Ou-Neua Temple and the That Phou Xay Stupa.

The Wat Ou-Tai Temple is in the Ban Ou-Tai village. It was built by Praya Chakkawattiraja and is said to be 500 years old. The Hor Thane Keo, inside the monastery, is a specific sanctum where Buddha images are deified. This sanctum is built with mud and has types of decorations retained in its original form. The wooden columns of the shrine are supported over on stone blocks; these have been designed and painted with drawings of daggers, swords, flowers and flags, and all carved in wood. There is a shrine built in brick masonry within the monastery complex which is called "Ou Bo Sot" (meaning a place where monks meet and conduct religious rites) by the Tai Lue ethnic groups.

Wat Luang Ou-Neua Temple is built about 500 years ago in Ban Ou Neua village. The temple has a double overlapping roof in the Lue architecture style. It is adorned with traditional fine art techniques and houses. A Buddha image and Buddha statues are deified inside this temple.

That Phou Xay Stupa is at the top of a hill, approached by walking up 400 steps.
