= Luma language =

Loloish language of Laos

Luma
- Eushi
- Native to: Laos
- Region: Phongsaly Province and nearby areas
- Native speakers: 12,000 (2023)
- Language family: Sino-Tibetan: Tibeto-Burman; Lolo–Burmese; Loloish; Southern Loloish; Akoid; Luma

Language codes
- ISO 639-3: –

Luma is a Southern Loloish language of northern Laos. Together with Akeu, it belongs to the Akoid (or Siloid) group of languages. Luma speakers consider themselves to be distinct from Akha. There are two dialects, Luma proper (also called Luma Pala) and Luma Eushi.

== Dialects ==
There are two dialects of Luma, with a combined total of about 12,000 speakers.

- Luma proper (autonym: Luma Palà): spoken mostly in Khua District, Phongsaly Province, as well as in Mai District and Samphan District. There are about 7,000 speakers in of Luma proper in Khua and Samphan districts.
- Luma Eushi (/ə̀sʲi/ [ə̀ɕi]): spoken by 4,752 people in Mai District, Phongsaly Province, in the 18 villages of Phia Lao Kao, Phia Lao Mai, Phiang Louang, Mong Lun, Huay Thong, Sao Yae, Lao Ma Kaang, Kha Ci, Houay Hong, Moutern, Houay Daeng, Chom Chaew, Phu Yang, Bom Yaaw, Phuen Tii, Houay Phouk, Kha Sa, Phia Lao Mai Kao. In the highland villages, most speakers are monolingual.

Alternative spellings and names include Louma Oeshi, Rshi, Uishui, Loma, Lou Ma, Lu Ma, and Ko-Luma.

Luma Eushi has been documented by Lew (2014), Gruber & Lew (2016), and Lew (2023).

Luma Pala (Luma proper) has been documented by Kingsada (1999) Shintani (2001).

An ISO 639-3 code is currently being requested for Luma.
