= Yang people =

Ethnic group of Phongsaly Province, Laos

The Yang people, also known as the Nhang or Nyang (autonym: jaŋ˩˧), are a Tai-speaking ethnic group residing in Phongsaly Province, northwestern Laos. According to Chazee (1998), their population was 5,843 people as of 2015. The Yang are heavily influenced by Tai Lue culture, although the Yang of Namo Nua village, Oudomxay province are more heavily influenced by Tai Dam people culture (Chazee 1998:23).

Jerold Edmondson (1997) reported that the Buyang people of southern China claim to have relatives in Phongsaly province, Laos. However, it is unclear whether the Yang of Laos are indeed related to the Buyang of China. The Yang Zhuang of southwestern Guangxi, China and some groups in northwestern Vietnam, known as "Nhắng", share similar names.

== Language ==
In February 1998, a 300-word basic vocabulary list of the Yang language was documented by Thongphet Kingsada and Tadahiko Shintani in Basic vocabularies of the languages spoken in Phongxaly, Lao P.D.R. (1999).

== History ==
According to Yang elders of Nam Fa village, Vieng Poukha District, the Yang had migratedover 200 years ago (or more than 4 generations ago) from the Dien Bien Phu area of northern Vietnam (Chazee 1998:23). Throughout Laos, the Yang currently practice paddy cultivation near streams in lowlands and valleys, at elevations of between 400 and 800 meters.

The Yang of Ay village, Namo District, claim to have originated from the Mường Lay and Mường Sô areas of northern Vietnam over 200 years ago, where they were referred to as "Tai Lay" (Chazee 1998:23). Initially, 12 Yang families settled in an area traditionally belonging to the Tai Lue people in Phongsaly. After two Indochinese wars, the Tai Lue returned from China to reclaim their territory, and settled in Khuang village, several kilometers away. Ay village experienced three destructive fires, in 1940, 1970, and 1991. After the 1991 fire, some families left Ay to establish the nearbyvillages of Ponxay Savan and Somsavan, believing Ay to be haunted by malevolent spirits.

== Distribution ==
The Yang are distributed in the following villages of Phongsaly, Luang Namtha, and Oudomxay provinces (Chazee 1998). Kingsada (1999) covers the Yang (jaŋ˩˧) language of Long Ngai Kao village, Bun Neua District, Phongsaly Province, Laos.

- Phongsaly
  - Khua District: Mone Savanh, Hat Xeui
  - Gnot Ou District: Xum Kham, Tha
  - Boun Tai District: Na Mak, Na Tene, Vieng Xai, Long Nam, Long Nay Khao
  - Boun Neua District: Muong Xou
- Oudomxay
  - Beng District: Khone
  - Namo District: Ay, Sonsavath, Ponxay Savan, Namo Neua
  - Xay District: Long Ya
- Luang Namtha
  - Vieng Poukha District: Nam Fa
  - Nale District: Nam Huay

Yang culture is best preserved in Vieng Poukha and Nale districts of Luang Namtha province (Chazee 1998).
