= Laoseng language =

Loloish language spoken in Laos

Laoseng
- Native to: Laos
- Language family: Sino-Tibetan: Tibeto-Burman; Lolo–Burmese; Loloish; Southern; Bisoid; Laoseng

Language codes
- ISO 639-3: None (mis)
- Glottolog: None

Laoseng (lao21 sɛŋ21; also known as kʰa55) is a Loloish language of northern Laos. David Bradley (2007) lists law21 sɛŋ21 as the autonym.

Kingsada (1999) documents lao21 sɛŋ21 of Chaho village, Bun Tay District, Phongsaly Province, while Kato (2008) documents kʰa55 of Namnat village, Nyot U District, Phongsaly Province.
