= Phunoi people =

Phunoi (Cống)
Total population
- ca. 40,000

Regions with significant populations
- Laos; Thailand; Vietnam 2,729 (2019)

Languages
- Phunoi • Côống

Religion
- Animism, Buddhism

The Phunoi (Thai: ผู้น้อย; Lao: ຜູ້ນ້ອຍ; also spelled Phu Noi or Phounoi, and called Côống, Cống, or formerly Khong in Vietnam) are a tribal people of Laos, Northern Thailand, and Vietnam. They are related to the Mpi people and the Bisu people.

== Etymology ==
"Phunoi" means "little man" in various Tai languages and is not this ethnic group's original name, which is probably "Khong".

== Distribution ==
There are approximately 35,600 Phunoi in Laos and 1,300 in Vietnam (the 1960 census indicated that there were approximately 6,500 at that time). In Laos, many Phunoi live in Phongsali Province (around the town of Phongsali), Louang Namtha Province, and Houaphanh Province. Some also live in Luang Phrabang Province and Vientiane Province, the remnant of those serving in the Royal Lao Armed Forces.

== Culture ==
They speak Phunoi, a Tibeto-Burman language that is classified as one of the Loloish languages. The community is divided into several clans, each with its own taboos and customs for ancestor worship. Their primary occupation is slash-and-burn agriculture. They also produce a variety of handicrafts, most notably rattan baskets and mats.
