= Pyen language =

Loloish language of Myanmar

Pyen
- Phen
- Native to: Myanmar
- Region: Shan State
- Native speakers: 600 (2013)
- Language family: Sino-Tibetan: Tibeto-Burman; Lolo–Burmese; Loloish; Southern; Bisoid; Pyen

Language codes
- ISO 639-3: pyy
- Glottolog: pyen1239

Pyen (Hpyin, Phen; pʰɛn) is a Loloish language of Myanmar. It is spoken by about 700 people in two villages near Mong Yang, Shan State, Burma, just to the north of Kengtung.

Pyen borrows more from Lahu and Shan, while Bisu borrows more from Northern Thai and Standard Thai. Pyen and Bisu are both mutually intelligible, since the two form a dialect chain along with Laomian and Laopin of China, and some Phunoi varieties of Laos (Person 2007). Pyen shares 36% lexical similarity with Hani, 32% with Lahu, and 31% with Lisu.
