= Phunyot language =

Loloish language of northern Laos

Phunyot
- Native to: Laos
- Language family: Sino-Tibetan: Tibeto-Burman; Lolo–Burmese; Loloish; Southern; Bisoid; Phunyot

Language codes
- ISO 639-3: None (mis)
- Glottolog: None

Phunyot (pʰu21 ɲɔt11) is a Loloish language of northern Laos.

Phunyot is spoken in Namo District, Oudomxai province, including in Namkang village (Kato 2008).
