= Cantan language =

Loloish language of northern Laos

Cantan
- Native to: Laos
- Language family: Sino-Tibetan: Tibeto-Burman; Lolo–Burmese; Loloish; Southern; Bisoid; Cantan

Language codes
- ISO 639-3: None (mis)
- Glottolog: None

Cantan (autonym: can33 tan33) is a Loloish language of northern Laos. It is closely related to Sinsali.
