= Laopan language =

Loloish language spoken in northern Laos

Laopan
- Native to: Laos
- Native speakers: (9,600 cited 2000)
- Language family: Sino-Tibetan: Tibeto-Burman; Lolo–Burmese; Loloish; Southern; Bisoid; Laopan

Language codes
- ISO 639-3: lbg
- Glottolog: laop1234

Laopan (autonym: law33 pan11 ba11) is a Loloish language of northern Laos. It is spoken in Bun Tay District, Phongsaly Province, Laos, including in Phaophumuang village (Kingsada 1999).
