= Khongsat language =

Loloish language of northern Laos

Khongsat
- Suma
- Native to: Laos
- Region: Oudomxay Province
- Native speakers: (110 cited 1999)
- Language family: Sino-Tibetan: Tibeto-Burman; Lolo–Burmese; Loloish; Southern; Bisoid; Khongsat

Language codes
- ISO 639-3: None (mis)
- Glottolog: None

Khongsat (also spelled Kongsat; native name: Suma, su55 ma33) is a Loloish language spoken in northern Laos. It belongs to the Sino-Tibetan language family and is classified within the Lolo–Burmese branch, specifically the Southern Loloish group and the Bisoid subgroup.

With a small number of speakers, Khongsat is considered an endangered language. It is one of the minority languages spoken in the mountainous regions of northern Laos, where many local languages face pressure from wider regional languages.

== Geographic distribution ==
Khongsat is spoken in Namo District, Oudomxai Province, northern Laos. The language has been documented in villages including Sutko village.

== Classification ==
Khongsat is classified as a member of the Bisoid subgroup of Loloish languages. Its classification is as follows:

- Sino-Tibetan languages
- Tibeto-Burman languages
- Lolo–Burmese languages
- Loloish languages
- Southern Loloish languages
- Bisoid languages

== Speakers and status ==
According to Chazee (1999), Khongsat had approximately 110 speakers at the time of documentation. Due to its limited number of speakers and restricted geographic distribution, the language is regarded as vulnerable and requires further documentation.

Research on Khongsat has been conducted as part of broader linguistic surveys of Tibeto-Burman languages in Laos, including fieldwork by Takashi Kato.

== Sources ==
- Kato, Takashi. 2008. Linguistic Survey of Tibeto-Burman languages in Lao P.D.R. Tokyo: Institute for the Study of Languages and Cultures of Asia and Africa (ILCAA).
- Kato, Takashi. 2018. An interim field report of Suma and Mlabri: Two endangered languages of Laos. Proceedings of the 51st International Conference on Sino-Tibetan Languages and Linguistics.
