= Bisoid languages =

Sino–Tibetan languages

Bisoid
- Phunoi
- Geographic distribution: Southern China and Indochina
- Linguistic classification: Sino-Tibetan: Tibeto-Burman; Lolo–Burmese; Loloish; Southern; Bisoid

Language codes
- Glottolog: biso1241

The Bisoid (Phunoi) languages belong to the Southern Loloish (Hanoish) branch of the Sino-Tibetan language family. Most Bisoid languages are spoken in Phongsaly Province, northern Laos, with smaller numbers of speakers living in China (Yunnan), Vietnam (Lai Châu Province), Myanmar (Shan State), and northern Thailand.

== Languages ==
The Bisoid languages are:

- Bantang
- Bisu (mBisu, Pisu)
- Cantan
- Cauho
- Cốông
- Habei (Mani)
- Khongsat (Suma)
- Laomian
- Laopan
- Laopin
- Laoseng
- Phongku (Phu Lawa)
- Phongset
- Phunoi
- Phunyot
- Pyen (Phen)
- Sangkong
- Sinsali (Singsili)
- Tsukong

== Classification ==
=== Bradley (2007) ===
David Bradley (2007) considers the following Bisoid dialects to be closely related.

- Bisu: 500 ethnic members in northern Thailand, with far fewer speakers
- Hpyin (Pyen): already reported as moribund in 1900, and replaced by Lahu
- Laomian: 4,000 speakers (out of 5,000 ethnic members) in central Lancang County
- Laopin: fewer than 1,000 speakers (out of 1,300 ethnic members) in Menghai County
- law33 pan11 (Lao-Pan in Kingsada (1999))

Bradley (2007) lists the following Sinsali (formerly Phunoi) languages, which differ from each other.

- Sinsali proper
- pʰɔŋ33 ku55 (Phongku in Kingsada (1999))
- law21 sɛŋ21 (Laoseng in Kingsada (1999))
- pi33 su44 (Bisu)

Other Bisoid languages include:

- Phongset (pʰoŋ33 set55) (Shintani 2001)
- Phunyot (pʰu21 ɲɔt11) (Kato 2008)

=== Udomkool (2006) ===
Kitjapol Udomkool (2006:34), citing data from Wright, also lists the following Bisoid (Phunoi) languages.

- Tsukong [tsu33 kɔŋ33] (China): close to Cốông
- Cauho [cau33 ho33] (Laos): divergent
- Bantang [ban33 taŋ33] (Laos): divergent
- Cantan [can33 tan33] (Laos): close to Sinsali

Kitjapol Udomkool (2006) gives the following computational classification for the Bisoid (Phunoi) group, using the UPGMA method.

- - Mpi
  - Bisoid
    - Bantang
    - - Cauho
      - - Tsukong, Cốông
        - - - - Phongku
              - - Cantan
                - - Sinsali
                  - Laoseng, Phongset
          - - Laopan
            - - Bisu, Pyen
              - Laopin, Laomian

=== Wright (n.d.) ===
Wright (n.d.) tentatively classifies the Singsali (Phunoi) languages of Phongsaly Province, Laos as follows. Phongku may or may not belong as the same group as Laoseng, Phongset, Cantan, and Singsali.

  - Bantang
  - Cauho
  - Laopan
    - Phongku (?)
    - Laoseng
    - Phongset
    - Cantan, Singsali

=== Hsiu (2016, 2018) ===
Bisoid languages were also analyzed in a 2016 computational phylogenetic lexical analysis by Hsiu (2016).

- Bisoid
  - Khongsat
  - Laoseng
  - Sangkong
  - Pyen
    - Lao-Pan
    - Bisu
    - Phunoi
    - Phongset
    - Phongku (Phu-Lawa)
    - Phunyot

The Bisoid classification above was subsequently revised by Hsiu (2018) as follows, with Habei added to Bisoid.

Bisoid

- Bisu cluster: Bisu, Laomian, Laopin, Pyen, Laopan
- Singsali cluster: Phunoi, Singsali, Cantan, Laoseng, Phongku, Phongset, Phunyot
- Coong cluster: Cốông, Sangkong, Tsukong
- Cauho
- Bantang
- Khongsat
- Habei (Mani)

Muda is also noted as having a Bisoid substratum and Akha superstratum. Khongsat and Laoseng have Siloid loanwords.
