= Phongku language =

Loloish language of northern Laos

Phongku
- Phu Lawa
- Native to: Laos
- Language family: Sino-Tibetan: Tibeto-Burman; Lolo–Burmese; Loloish; Southern; Bisoid; Phongku

Language codes
- ISO 639-3: None (mis)
- Glottolog: None

Phongku (pʰɔŋ33 ku55 bɔ11) is a Loloish language of Phongsaly Province, northern Laos. David Bradley (2007) lists pʰɔŋ33 ku55 as the autonym.

In Phongsaly Province, Laos, Phongku is spoken in Phongku Long, Bun Tay District (Kingsada 1999). Another group called pʰɔŋ33 ku55 or Phu-Lawa speaks a closely related language variety in Phongkulong village, Bun Tay District (Shintani 2001).

== Sources ==
- Kingsadā, Thō̜ngphet, and Tadahiko Shintani. 1999 Basic Vocabularies of the Languages Spoken in Phongxaly, Lao P.D.R. Tokyo: Institute for the Study of Languages and Cultures of Asia and Africa (ILCAA).
- Shintani, Tadahiko, Ryuichi Kosaka, and Takashi Kato. 2001. Linguistic Survey of Phongxaly, Lao P.D.R. Tokyo: Institute for the Study of Languages and Cultures of Asia and Africa (ILCAA).
- Wright, Pamela Sue. n.d. Singsali (Phunoi) Speech Varieties Of Phongsali Province. m.s.
