= Pala language =

Pala may be :

- Palaic language
- Pela language
- Pa'a language
- a dialect of the Luma language
- a dialect of the Patpatar language
