= Phongset language =

Loloish language of Laos

Phongset
- Native to: Laos
- Language family: Sino-Tibetan: Tibeto-Burman; Lolo–Burmese; Loloish; Southern; Bisoid; Phongset

Language codes
- ISO 639-3: None (mis)
- Glottolog: None

Phongset (pʰoŋ33 set55) is a Loloish language of Phongsaly Province, northern Laos.

In Phongsaly Province, Laos, Phongset is spoken in Phongset village, Bun Neua District (Shintani 2001).
