= Phen =

Phen may refer to:

- Phen, an abbreviation for the chemical compound phenethylamine
- Phen, an abbreviation for the chemical compound phenanthroline
- Phen, an abbreviation for phentermine in the pharmaceutical drug known as fen-phen
- Phen District, a district in Udon Thani Province, Thailand
- Pyen language, also known as Phen, a Loloish language of Burma
