= May District =

May District may refer to:

- May District, Kazakhstan
- May District, Laos

== See also ==
- May (disambiguation)
