= Tsukong language =

Loloish language of China

Tsukong
- Native to: China
- Language family: Sino-Tibetan: (Tibeto-Burman); Lolo–Burmese; Loloish; Southern; Bisoid; Tsukong

Language codes
- ISO 639-3: None (mis)
- Glottolog: None

Tsukong (autonym: tsu33 kɔŋ33) is a Loloish language of Yunnan, China. It is closely related to the Coong language of northwestern Vietnam. Tsukong speakers are found in Xishuangbanna Prefecture.

== Phonology ==
The following phonemes are reported in Udomkool (2006).

Tsukong has twenty-four consonants /p pʰ b m w t tʰ s ts d n l ʃ c cʰ ɲ j k kʰ x g ŋ ʔ h/, 9 vowels /i e æ a ɨ ə u o ɔ/, and 3 diphthongs /əi iu ui/.

Tsukong has a three-tone system. The tones are 35 (mid-rising), 33 (mid), and 31 (mid-falling).
