= Laomian language =

Sino-Tibetan language

Laomian
- Bisu, Guba or Lawmeh
- Native to: China
- Region: Yunnan Province
- Ethnicity: Laomian
- Native speakers: (5,000 cited 1985)
- Language family: Sino-Tibetan: Tibeto-Burman; Lolo–Burmese; Loloish; Southern; Bisoid; Laomian
- Dialects: Lanmeng; Huaipa; Dako; Laopin

Language codes
- ISO 639-3: lwm
- Glottolog: laom1237
- ELP: Laomian

Laomian (Chinese: 老緬語; pinyin: Lǎomiǎnyǔ, also known as Bisu, Guba or Lawmeh) is a Sino-Tibetan language and is a Chinese derivation of the Lahu name Lawmeh. Laomian is closely related to the Bisu language, is spoken in Laomian Dazhai (老缅大寨), Zhutang Township (竹塘乡), Lancang County, Yunnan. There are 4,000 speakers (out of 5,000 ethnic members) in central Lancang County, Yunnan, and fewer than 1,000 Laopin speakers, which may not be included in these numbers. Its language family consists of Sino-Tibetan, Tibeto-Burman, Ngwi-Burmese, Ngwi, Southern, Bisoid, Bisu-Pyen-Laomian, Bisu, Pyen, and Laomian. It is mostly spoken in China in the Southwestern areas of Yunnan Province that joins Thailand and Myanmar. Speakers of Laomian that live in areas with different ethnic groups mostly speak Laomian in their home, while using the main local ethnic language in public. The average age of Laomian speakers is increasing into the sixties to seventies in areas of heterogeneous communities because children are learning the main local language. The domination of Chinese language has had a major impact on the villages of the Laomian people due to the increasing number of people who can speak multiple languages.

== Geographic distribution ==
Two centuries ago, the Lahu people started a rebellion in the Shuangjiang, Lancang and Menglian areas of Yunnan Province. The Bisu people, also known as the Laomian and Laopin people, joined them. In 1801 the rebellion was stopped and the Bisu people followed the Nanku River south. They experienced many grades of oppression in various locations and finally arrived at Muga Mengnuo and Zhutand in Lancang. The Bisu people were entangled in an armed uprising of farmers. This was put down by the alliance of the Lahu Tsui, Han landlords and the local warlords. The Bisu people then moved to Menglian, Ximeng and Menghai. Mong Yang township is bordered to the east by Menghai County and to the north by Menglian County – both areas where Bisu settled and remain to the present day.

== Official status ==
China is the only country to still have people who still use Laomian. Some of the places located within China that still use this language are:

- Yunnan Province
  - Lancang County
  - Menglian County
  - Ximeng County
- Menghai County (in Mengzhe Township)

== Dialects/Varieties ==
The languages Lanmeng, Huaipa, Dakao, Laopin are similar to Pyen and Bisu, but have a ninety-three to ninety-five percent lexical similarity to Laomian and Laopin and eighty-eight percent to Bisu in Thailand.

== Derived languages ==
Laopin has been influenced by the Tai Lue people over a long time period, while both Laomian and Laopin have been influenced recently by Chinese. Due to this, there are many loanwords, concepts and new technological terms that are not traditional Bisu terms. These neighboring influences have affected Laomian and Laopin grammar and phonology.

== Grammar ==
In 2000, Person studied sentence-final particles in Bisu narrative. In his studies, he looked at 13 written folktales, 6 expository texts, and 3 life histories to establish the aspects that influence particle usage. Person examines variables such as, place in the discourse, relative transitivity, sentence complexity, occurrence or nonoccurrence in quotations and evidential perspective. He also studied the effect of text-type on particle usage in Bisu discourse and concluded that Bisu particles vary according to text type.

=== Syntax ===
A researcher named Xu Shixuan studied and gave examples of how Bisu syntax had been affected due to the contact that they had with neighbouring languages. The traditional SOV constituent order is occasionally changed to SVO because both Chinese and Dai have SVO order. Also, another researcher, Day, analyzed Bisu noun phrase in Doi Chumphu village, Thailand. She characterized the noun phrase in Bisu, and declared that the word, [maŋ], in Bisu is a classifier and that the prefix [aŋ-] is a nominalizer. Another researcher, Gustafson, contributed a detailed grammar statement for Thailand Bisu. She described complex sentences including nominalization, relativization and complementation, as well as, a more in-depth piece information of verbal particles, pragmatically marked structures and an explanation of the role of the prefixes ang- and a- are provided in her study.

== Vocabulary ==
In the recent years, the use of Chinese is becoming more popular and is causing a language shift. Many people are using Lahu, Mandarin Chinese, Hani and Lü. Laomian is very threatened to endangerment, notably in the Nanya in Menglian, where it is economically advantaged and the use of Chinese and Lahu are replacing Laomian. More than fifty percent of the Laomian population that is left in China is mixed with Lahu-majority villages and not all of the remaining people can speak Laomian.

In Muang Muang Tun's research 48/48 of the people responded that they use Laomian/Laopin while speaking to their parents, grandparents, siblings, children, grandchildren, nieces and nephews. These people use Laomian/Laopin the most in their families. Although, 3/36 Laomian people stated that they use Lahu when they speak to their spouses and 3/12 Laopin people use Chinese or Lahu or Dai to communicate with their spouses. 48/48 Laomian/Laopin people stated that they use Laomian/Laopin when they talk to Laomian/Laopin friends at a funeral or village meeting, but 48/48 [100%] said that they use Chinese when they meet government workers. Lastly, 48/48 [100%] said that the Laomain/Laopin children will be speaking Laomian/Laopin in the future.

== Writing system ==
The writing system that is used is Thai script which is experimental. The Thai script consists of 44 consonant letters and 15 vowel symbols and combine into at least 28 vowel forms, as well as, four tone diacritics. Thai script is a segmental writing system or an abugida. While using this writing system, the consonants are written horizontally from left to right and the vowels are placed either to the left or right, or above or below the consonant that is being used.
