= Bisu language =

Loloish language spoken in Thailand and China

Bisu
- Native to: Thailand, China
- Ethnicity: 700 in Thailand (2007)
- Native speakers: 240 in China (2005)
- Language family: Sino-Tibetan: Tibeto-Burman; Lolo–Burmese; Loloish; Southern; Bisoid; Phunoi–Bisu; Bisu
- Writing system: Thai script, Latin script

Language codes
- ISO 639-3: bzi
- Glottolog: bisu1244
- ELP: Bisu
- Bisu is classified as Definitely Endangered by the UNESCO Atlas of the World's Languages in Danger.

Bisu (Chinese: 毕苏语) is a Loloish language of Thailand, with a couple thousand speakers in China. Varieties are Bisu proper (Mbisu) and Laomian (Guba), considered by Pelkey to be distinct languages.

The Laomian are classified within the Lahu ethnic group; the Lahu proper call them the "Lawmeh".

== Distribution ==
According to Bisuyu Yanjiu 毕苏语研究 (2002), there are over 5,000 Bisu speakers in Yunnan, China, and a total of nearly 10,000 Bisu speakers in all countries combined. Within Yunnan, it is spoken mostly in Pu'er Prefecture, as well as neighboring parts of Xishuangbanna.

- Lancang County 澜沧县
  - Zhutang 竹塘乡
    - Dazhai 大寨, Laomian 老面 (see Laomian language)
  - Laba 拉巴乡
  - Donglang 东朗乡
  - Fubang 富邦乡
- Menghai County 勐海县
  - Mengzhe 勐遮乡
    - Laopinzhai 老品寨 (see Laopin language)
- Ximeng County 西盟县
  - Lisuo 力锁乡
- Menglian County 孟连县
  - Nanya 南雅乡

In Thailand, two dialects of Bisu are spoken in the following villages of Phan District, Chiang Rai Province (Bisuyu Yanjiu 2002:152).

- Dialect 1: Huai Chomphu village (also called Ban Huaisan) and Doi Pui village
- Dialect 2: Phadaeng village

Another variety of Bisu differing from the Phayao variety is spoken in Takɔ (Ban Thako), Mae Suai District, Chiang Rai Province.

In Laos, Bisu (pi33 su44; also called Lao-Phai) is spoken in Phudokcham village, Phongxaly District. In Myanmar, Bisu is spoken in three or two villages of Shan State, and Bisu speakers live alongside Pyen speakers

== Orthography ==
In Thailand, the Bisu language is written with the Thai script.

=== Consonants ===
Consonants
| | | Labial | Coronal | | Palatal | Velar | Glottal |
| | | Labial | plain | sibilant | Palatal | Velar | Glottal |
|---|---|---|---|---|---|---|---|
| Plosive/ Affricate | unaspirated | p ⟨p, ป⟩ | t ⟨t, ต⟩ | ts ⟨c, จฺ⟩ | t͡ɕ~t͡ʃ ⟨č, จ⟩ | k ⟨k, ก⟩ | ʔ ⟨-, อ⟩ |
| Plosive/ Affricate | aspirated | pʰ ⟨ph, พ⟩ | tʰ ⟨th, ท⟩ | tsʰ ⟨ch, ชฺ⟩ | t͡ɕʰ~t͡ʃʰ ⟨čh, ช⟩ | kʰ ⟨kh, ค⟩ | |
| Plosive/ Affricate | voiced | b ⟨b, บ⟩ | d ⟨d, ด⟩ | | | g ⟨g, กง⟩ | |
| Fricative | | f ⟨f, ฟ⟩ | | s ⟨s, ซ⟩ | ʃ ⟨š, ซฺ⟩ | | h ⟨h, ฮ⟩ |
| Nasal | plain | m ⟨m, ม⟩ | n ⟨n, น⟩ | | ɲ ⟨ñ, ญ⟩ | ŋ ⟨ŋ, ง⟩ | |
| Nasal | preaspirated | m̥ ⟨hm, ฮม⟩ | n̥ ⟨hn, ฮน⟩ | | ɲ̊ ⟨hñ, ฮญ⟩ | ŋ̊ ⟨hŋ, ฮง⟩ | |
| Approximant | plain | w ⟨w, ว⟩ | l ⟨l, ล⟩ | | j ⟨y, ย⟩ | | |
| Approximant | preaspirated | | l̥ ⟨hl, ฮล⟩ | | j̊ ⟨hy, ฮย⟩ | | |

=== Vowels ===
There is no different meaning between long and short vowels. However, check syllables may sound shorter than non-checked ones when speaking. Thai standard uses only long vowels.

- -า – a – [a]
- -ี – i – [i]
- -ือ/-ื – ɨ – [ɨ~ʉ]
- -ู – u – [u]
- เ- – e – [e]
- แ- – ɛ – [ɛ~æ]
- โ- – o – [o]
- -อ – ɔ – [ɔ]
- เ-อ/เ-ิ – ə – [ə]
- เ-ีย – ia – [ia]

=== Tones ===
- – – no mark – mid
- -่ – grave accent – low
- -้ – acute accent – high
