= Phou Den Din National Protected Area =

Protected area in Laos

- IUCN category VI (protected area with sustainable use of natural resources)
- Location within Laos

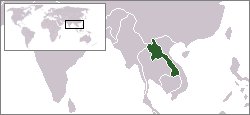
- Location in Laos
- Location: Phongsaly, Laos
- Coordinates: 21.951984°N 102.422338°E
- Area: 2,200 km^{2} (850 sq mi)
- Elevation: 1,700 m (5,600 ft)
- Designated: 1993

Phou Den Din National Protected Area or National Biodiversity Conservation Area (NBCA) is a protected area in northern Laos, covering 2,200 km2 in Phongsaly Province. It was designated a National Biodiversity Conservation Area in 1993. The name is also spelt Phou Dene Dinh and Phou Daen Din. The conservation area borders Vietnam, and its terrain is hilly, rising to over 2,000 meters. Among the animals found in the area are elephants, gibbons, macaques, gaurs, bantengs, Asiatic black bears, sun bears, leopards, and tigers. It also has a high density of lesser fish eagles and crested kingfishers. The area is not easily accessible, but can be reached by boat or on foot.

== See also ==
- Protected areas of Laos
