= Côống language =

Loloish language spoken in Vietnam

Côống
- Native to: Vietnam
- Ethnicity: Côống (subgroup of the Phunoi)
- Native speakers: 2,000 (2009 census)
- Language family: Sino-Tibetan: Tibeto-Burman; Lolo–Burmese; Loloish; Southern; Bisoid; Côống
- Writing system: Latin script

Language codes
- ISO 639-3: cnc
- Glottolog: coon1239
- ELP: Côông

Côống is a Loloish language of Vietnam. It is spoken by approximately 1,500 speakers in Mường Tè District, Lai Châu Province, Vietnam. It is related to but quite distinct from Phunoi.

== Distribution ==
According to Jerold Edmondson (2002), Côống is spoken in 5 villages of Mường Tè District, Lai Châu Province, Vietnam.

- Bo Lếch, Can Hồ commune
- Nậm Khao, Nậm Khao commune
- Nậm Pục, Nậm Khao commune
- Tác Ngá, Mường Mồ commune
- Nậm Kè, Mường Tong commune

According to Phạm Huy (1998:10), Côống is spoken in the following villages, all of which are in Mường Tè District except for Huổi Sâư.

- Bo Lếch, Can Hồ commune
- Nậm Luồng, Can Hồ commune (part of Bo Lếch before)
- Nậm Khao, Nậm Khao commune
- Nậm Pục, Nậm Khao commune
- Tác Ngá, Mường Mô commune
- Nậm Kè, Mường Toong commune
- Huổi Sâư, Chà Cang commune, Mường Lay district

== Subdivisions ==
Phạm Huy (1998:12) lists the following two Côống ethnic subdivisions.

- Xí Tù Mạ (Silver Côống)
- Xám Khổng Xú Lứ (Golden Côống)

== Phrases ==
Golden Côống and Silver Côống differ linguistically, as illustrated by the following phrases from Phạm (1998:13) in Vietnamese orthography (quốc ngữ).

- Golden Coong
  - Háng lế ('Who is there?')
  - Hàng chà ('eat rice')
  - Ý sộ tắng ('drink water')
- Silver Coong
  - À sáng lê ('Who is there?')
  - Hắng tà ('eat rice')
  - Lắng tắng ('drink water')

Golden Côống numbers are (Phạm 1998:13):

- 1. tìm
- 2. nhịp
- 3. xem
- 4. ừn
- 5. ngà
- 6. khô
- 7. xị
- 8. dẹ
- 9. quề
- 10. trse
- 11. trse tìm
- 12. trse nhịp
- 20. nhịp trse
- 21. nhịp trse tìm
- 30. xem trse
- 31. xem trse tìm
- 40. ừn trse
- 50. ngà trse
- 100. trse trse
