= Pak Beng district =

Pak Beng ເມືອງປາກແບ່ງ
- District
- Interactive map of Pak Beng
- Country: Laos
- Province: Oudomxay province

Population (2015)
  - Total: 29,405
- Time zone: UTC+7 (ICT)

Pak Beng is a district (muang) of Oudomxay province in northwestern Laos.

== Pak Beng Dam ==
Seven kilometres upstream of Pak Beng is where the proposed Pak Beng Dam is to be sited. The 912 megawatt project is the northernmost of a proposed 11 dams on the lower Mekong River. Ninety percent of the electricity generated is to be sold to Thailand. The remaining 10 percent will go to the Lao state-owned utility company, Electricite du Laos.
