= Chepya language =

Southern Loloish language of northern Laos

Chepya
- Chipia
- Native to: Laos
- Region: Phongsaly Province
- Native speakers: 2,000 (2007)
- Language family: Sino-Tibetan: (Tibeto-Burman); Lolo–Burmese; Loloish; Southern; Hanoid; Chepya

Language codes
- ISO 639-3: ycp
- Glottolog: chep1243
- ELP: Chepya

Chepya (autonym: cɛ11 pja11) is a Southern Loloish language of northern Laos.

Chepya of Sano Kao village, Bun Tay District, Phongsaly Province, Laos is documented in Kingsada & Shintani (1999).

== Sources ==
- Kingsadā, Thō̜ngphet, and Tadahiko Shintani. 1999. Basic Vocabularies of the Languages Spoken in Phongxaly, Lao P.D.R. Tokyo: Institute for the Study of Languages and Cultures of Asia and Africa (ILCAA).
