= Bantang language =

Loloish language of northern Laos

Bantang
- Native to: Laos
- Language family: Sino-Tibetan: Tibeto-Burman; Lolo–Burmese; Loloish; Southern; Bisoid; Bantang

Language codes
- ISO 639-3: None (mis)
- Glottolog: bant1298

Bantang (autonym: ban33 taŋ33) is a Loloish language of northern Laos. It is divergent within the Bisoid (Phunoi) branch.
