= Cauho language =

Loloish language of northern Laos

Cauho
- Native to: Laos
- Language family: Sino-Tibetan: Tibeto-Burman; Lolo–Burmese; Loloish; Southern; Bisoid; Cauho

Language codes
- ISO 639-3: None (mis)
- Glottolog: cauh1234

Cauho (autonym: cau33 ho33) is a Loloish language of northern Laos. It is divergent with the Bisoid (Phunoi) branch.
