= Ban Tong =

Ban Tong บ้านต้อง
- Tambon
- Interactive map of Ban Tong
- Coordinates: 18°07′16″N 103°56′16″E
- Country: Thailand
- Province: Bueng Kan
- Amphoe: Seka

Population (2020)
  - Total: 11,438
- Time zone: UTC+7 (TST)
- Postal code: 38150
- TIS 1099: 380404

Ban Tong (Thai: บ้านต้อง) is a tambon (subdistrict) of Seka District, in Bueng Kan Province, Thailand. In 2020, it had a total population of 11,438 people.

== History ==
The subdistrict was created effective May 16, 1968 by splitting off 9 administrative villages from Pho Mak Khaeng.

== Administration ==
=== Central administration ===
The tambon is subdivided into 15 administrative villages (muban).

No.	Name	Thai
1.	Ban Tong	บ้านต้อง
2.	Ban Khok Krasae	บ้านโคกกระแซ
3.	Ban Don Siat	บ้านดอนเสียด
4.	Ban Thung Sai Chok	บ้านทุ่งทรายจก
5.	Ban Non Suan Mon	บ้านโนนสวนหม่อน
6.	Ban Siri Phat	บ้านศิริพัฒน์
7.	Ban Non Yang Kham	บ้านโนนยางคำ
8.	Ban Khon Sawan	บ้านคอนสวรรค์
9.	Ban Kham Chomphu	บ้านคำชมภู
10.	Ban Phu Ngoen	บ้านภูเงิน
11.	Ban Don Siat Nuea	บ้านดอนเสียดเหนือ
12.	Ban Don Siat Tai	บ้านดอนเสียดใต้
13.	Ban Siri Mongkhon	บ้านศิริมงคล
14.	Ban Phu Sai Thong	บ้านภูทรายทอง
15.	Ban Khon Saeng Thong	บ้านโคกแสงทอง

=== Local administration ===
The whole area of the subdistrict is covered by the subdistrict administrative organization (SAO) Ban Tong (องค์การบริหารส่วนตำบลบ้านต้อง).
