= Phunoi language =

Sino-Tibetan language spoken in Laos

Phunoi
- Singsali
- Native to: Laos
- Region: Phongsaly Province
- Ethnicity: Phunoi
- Native speakers: (45,000 cited 1995–2000)
- Language family: Sino-Tibetan: Tibeto-Burman; Lolo–Burmese; Loloish; Southern; Bisoid; Phunoi–Bisu; Phunoi

Language codes
- ISO 639-3: pho
- Glottolog: phun1245
- ELP: Phunoi

Phunoi (Sinsali) is a Loloish language of northern Laos. Dialects are divergent and may be distinct languages; these are Black Khoany, White Khoany, Mung, Hwethom, Khaskhong. Bradley cites six languages within Phunoi.

In Phongsaly Province, Phunoi is spoken in Phongxaly District and Bun Tay District (including in Langne Village) (Kingsada 1999).
