= Samphanh district =

Coordinates: 21°20′51″N 102°21′19″E

Samphanh district ເມືອງສຳພັນ
- District
- Interactive map of Samphanh district
- Country: Laos
- Province: Phongsaly

Population
  - Total: 24,420
- Time zone: UTC+7 (ICT)

Samphanh is a district (muang) of Phongsaly province in northern Laos.

== Settlements ==
- A Cho Ban Nôi
