= May district, Laos =

Coordinates: 21.1665°N 102.7506°E

May district ເມືອງໃໝ່
- District
- Interactive map of May district
- Country: Laos
- Province: Phongsaly

Population
  - Total: 26,361
- Time zone: UTC+7 (ICT)

May District, Laos is a district (muang) of Phongsaly province in northern Laos.
