= Oudomxay province =

Province of Laos

Oudomxay province ແຂວງ ອຸດົມໄຊ
- Province
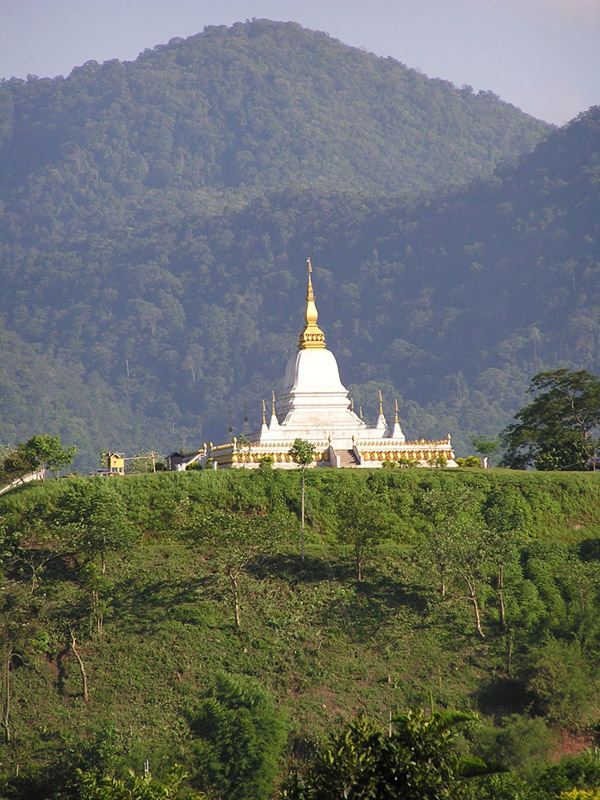

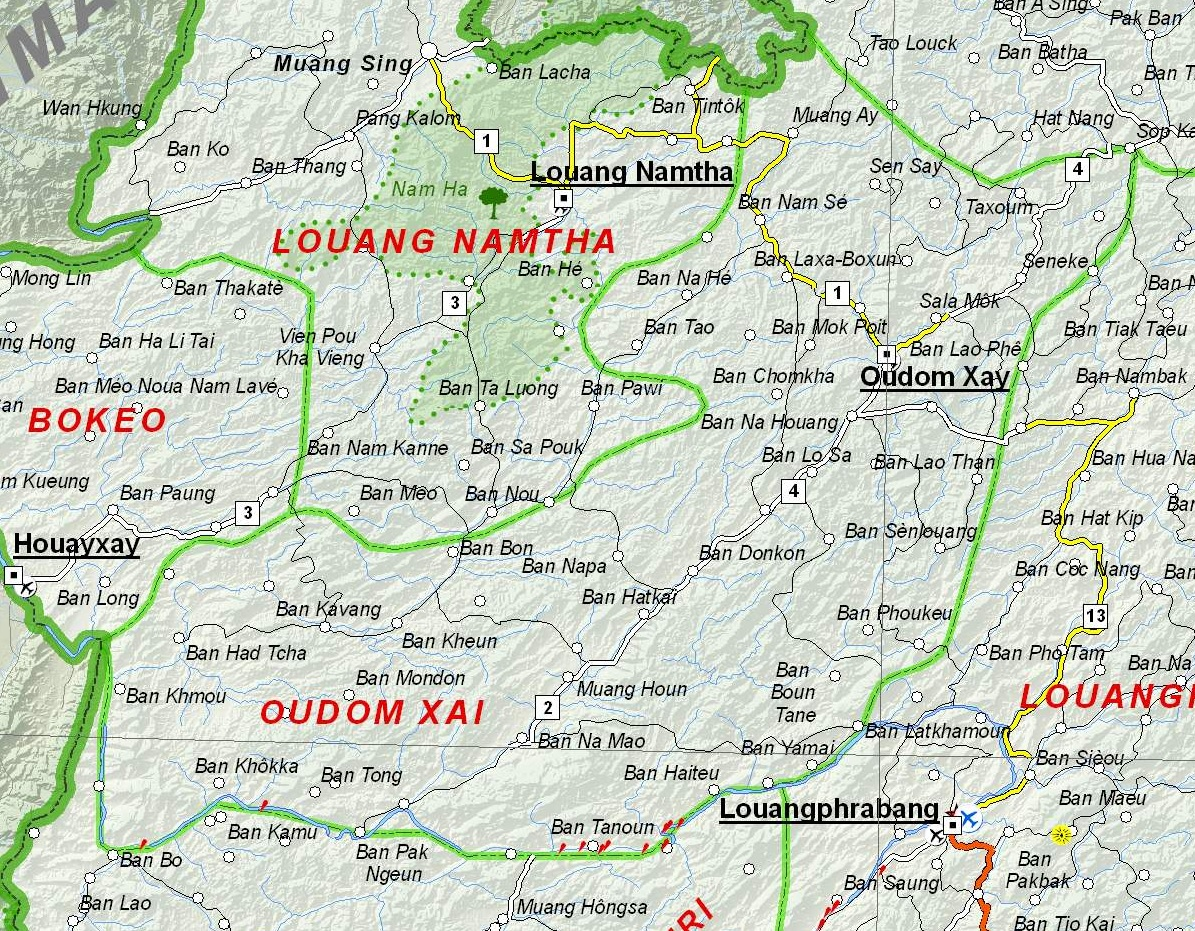
- Map of Oudomxai province

- Location of Oudomxay province in Laos
- Coordinates: 20.7°N 101.816667°E
- Country: Laos
- Capital: Muang Xay

Area
  - Total: 15,370 km^{2} (5,930 sq mi)

Population (2020 census)
  - Total: 345,425
  - Density: 22.47/km^{2} (58.21/sq mi)
- Time zone: UTC+07
- ISO 3166 code: LA-OU
- HDI (2022): 0.581 medium · 13th
- Website: Official website

Oudomxay (alternates: Oudômxai or Moung Xai; Lao: ອຸດົມໄຊ, pronounced [ʔú.dòm.sáj]) is a province of Laos, located in the northwest of the country. Its capital is Muang Xai. It covers an area of 15,370 square kilometres (5,930 sq mi). It borders China to the north, Phongsali province to the northeast, Luang Prabang province to the east and southeast, Xaignabouli province to the south and southwest, Bokeo province to the west, and Luang Namtha province to the northwest. Its topography is mountainous, between 300–1,800 metres (980–5,910 ft) above sea level.

Besides rice, other local crops are corn, soybeans, fruits, vegetables, cassava (maniok), sugarcane, tobacco, cotton wool, tea and peanuts. In 2004, approximately 10,000 tons of sugarcane and 45,000 tons of corn were produced there.

== Geography ==
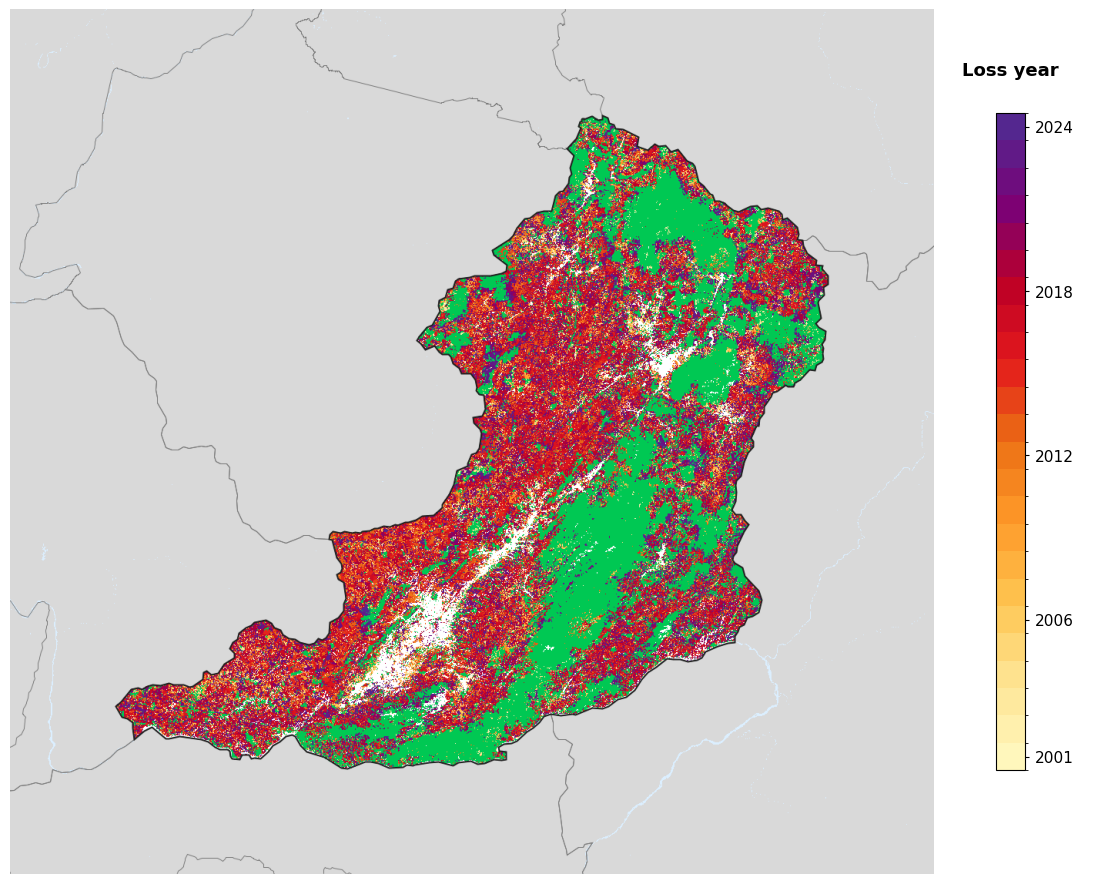
Tree-cover loss year in Oudomxay, 2001-2024, from the Global Forest Change dataset.

Oudomxay province, one of the provinces of Laos, covers an area of 15,370 square kilometres (5,930 sq mi). The province borders China to the north, Phongsali province to the northeast, Luang Prabang province to the east and southeast, Xaignabouli province to the south and southwest, Bokeo province to the west, and Luang Namtha province to the northwest. In the northwest there is a 15 kilometres (9.3 mi) border with the autonomous area of Xishuangbanna of the People's Republic of China. Settlements include Muang Xay, Muang La, Pak Beng, Sen Say, Taxoum, Seneke, Sala Mok, Ban Na He, Ban Chomka, Ban Lao Phe, Ban Na Houang, Ban Lo Sa, Ban Lao Than, Ban Donkon, Ban Senlouang, Ban Napa, Ban Phoukeu, Ban Yamai, Ban Haiteu, Ban Kavang, Ban Kheun, Muang Houn, Ban Na Mao, Ban Tong, Ban Khmou, Ban Khokka, and Ban Tong.

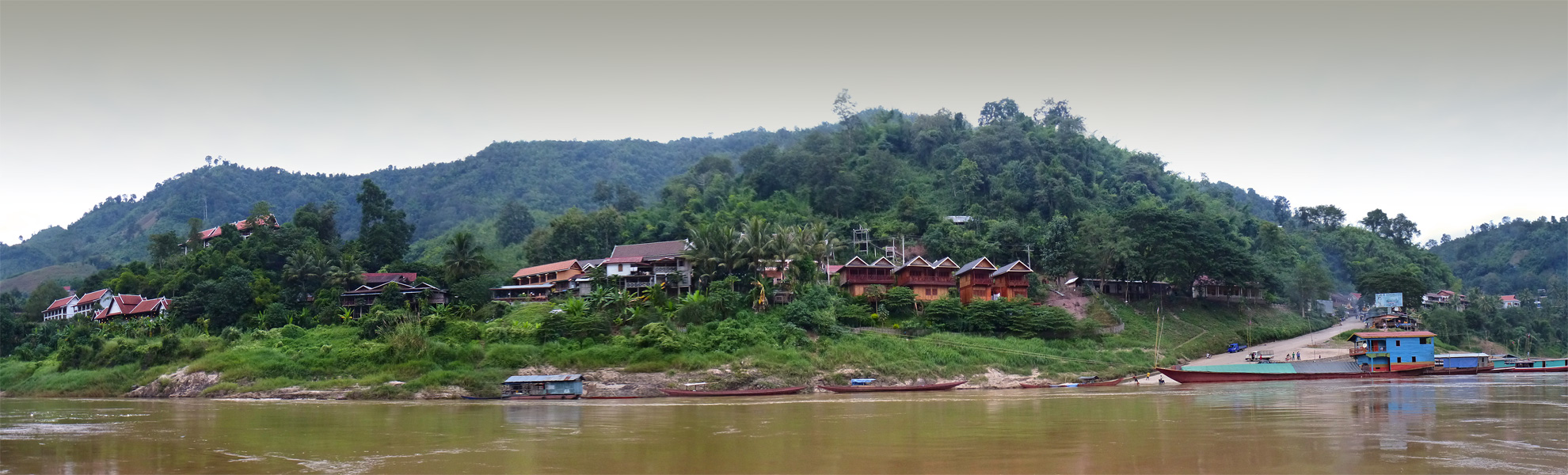
Pak Beng viewed from the Mekong

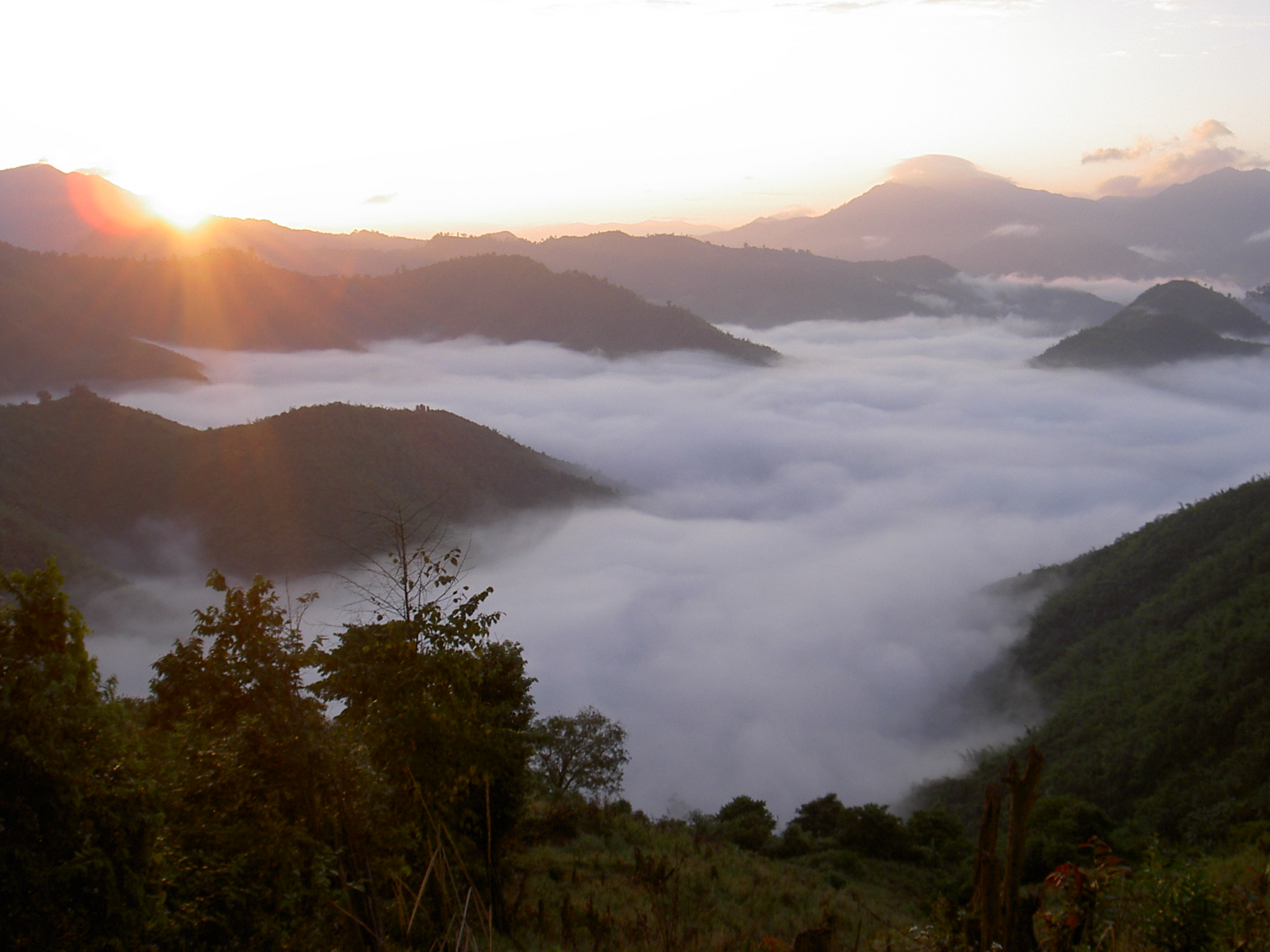
A sea of clouds in Pak Beng

The topography of Oudomxay has altitudes vary between 300–1,800 metres (980–5,910 ft) above sea level. Approximately 60 rivers flow through Oudomxay province, as for example Nam Phak, Nam Sae, Nam Beng, Nam Kor and Nam Nga. The Nam Kor flows through the province capital Muang Xay. Oudomxay province has a moderate monsoon climate. The yearly amount of rain is about 1,900–2,600 millimetres (75–102 in). Temperatures in February and March average between 18 and 19 °C, from April to May temperatures climb over 31 °C. Due to higher altitudes there are more variations in temperature during the year and a colder dry season in northern Laos as in the rest of the country.

=== Protected areas ===
The Upper Lao Mekong Important Bird Area (IBA) is 10,980 hectare in size. It spans the provinces of Oudomxai, Bokeo, and Sainyabuli. The altitude is 300–400 metres (980–1,310 ft) above sea level. Noted topography includes river channel, exposed beds, sandbars, sand and gravel bars, islands, rock outcrops, bushland, and braided streams. Black-bellied Tern Sterna acuticauda, Great Cormorant Phalacrocorax carbo, Grey-headed Lapwing V. cinereus, Jerdon's Bushchat Saxicola jerdoni, Plain Martin Riparia paludicola, River Lapwing Vanellus duvaucelii, Small Pratincole Glareola lactea, and Swan Goose Anser cygnoides are some of the recorded avifauna.

Some kinds of bamboo and a range of plants (for example orchids) are found in the region. Hardwoods like teak and mahogany trees grow in Oudomxay and are sources of income for the population.

=== Administrative divisions ===
The province is made up of the following districts:

Map	Code	Name	Lao script	Population (2015)
	04-01	Xay District	ເມືອງໄຊ	79,535
	04-02	La District	ເມືອງຫຼາ	17,173
	04-03	Namo District	ເມືອງນາໝໍ້	38,826
	04-04	Nga District	ເມືອງງາ	30,938
	04-05	Beng District	ເມືອງແບ່ງ	37,491
	04-06	Houne District	ເມືອງຮຸນ	74,254
	04-07	Pakbeng District	ເມືອງປາກແບ່ງ	29,405

== History ==
According to local history books, the first people who settled in Oudomxay around the year 700 were "Khom" (also known as Khmu).

Ly culture, which was marked by Buddhism on the one hand and the old Khom traditions on the other hand, grew in the region. Khom and Leu lived together and shared the same rice fields. To provide protection they erected fortifications between the villages of Na Sao and Na Lai. Around 1828, Hmong tribes coming from China began to settle in Oudomxay. The province was created in 1976, when it was split off from Luang Prabang. Around 1987 the capital of the province was moved from Ban Nahin to Muang Xay. In 1992, the districts Paktha and Pha Oudom were reassigned to Bokeo province.

== Demographics ==
The population of the province according to the 2015 census is 307,622.

According to the province administration, the following estimations regarding the proportions of the approximately 14 ethnic groups living in Oudomxay can be assumed; Khmu (among them Khmu Lu, Khmu Khong, Khmu Am, Khmu Bit) 60–80%, Lao Loum 25%, Hmong (among them Hmong Khao, Hmong Dam und Hmong lai) 15%. Other ethnic groups living in the province include Akha, Phouthai (Thai Dam & Thai Khao), Phou Noy (Phou Xang, Phou Kongsat, Phou Nhot), Lao Houy (also „Lenten“), Phouan, Ly, Yang, Ikho and Ho.

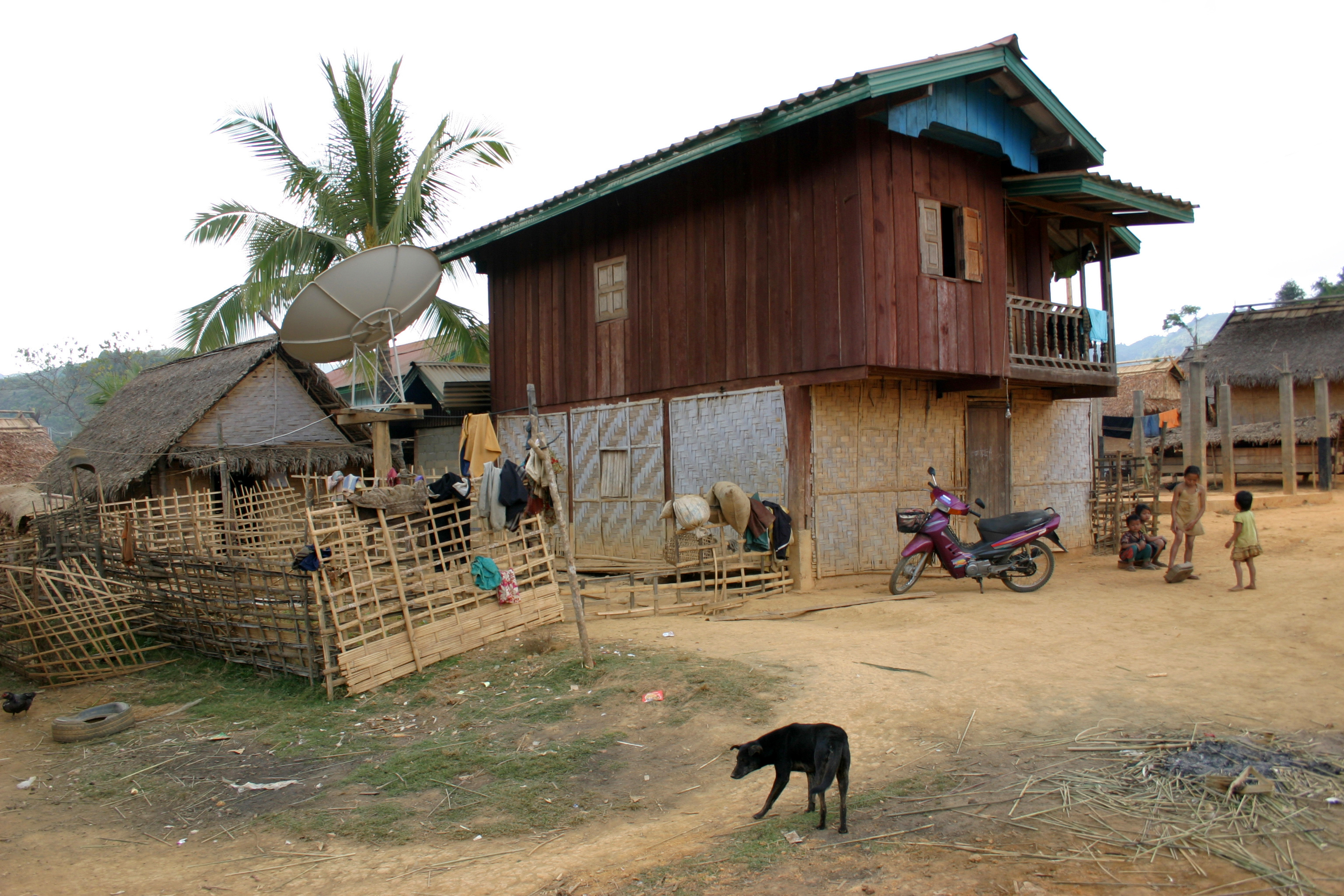
Khmu village Ban Ka Chait

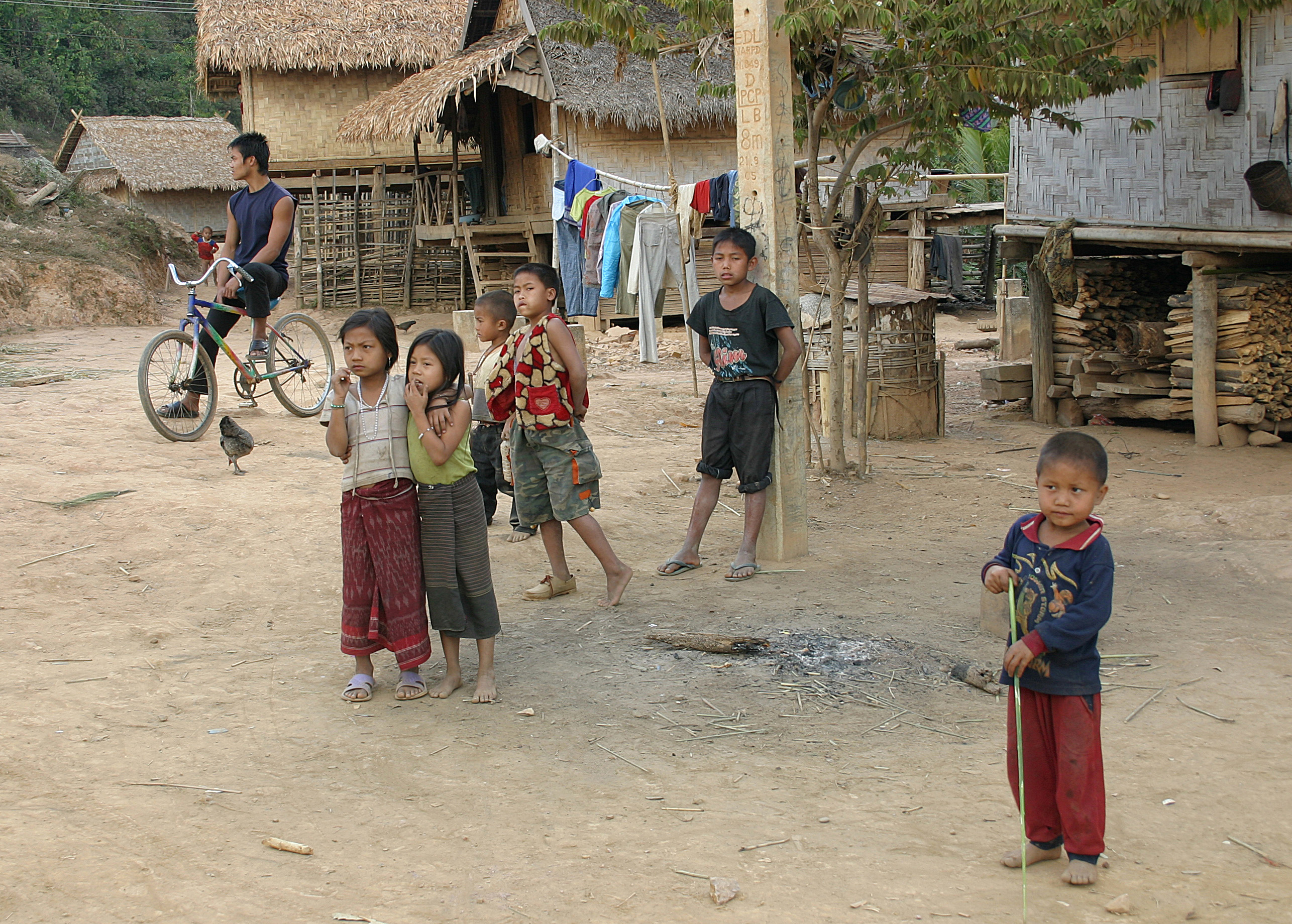
Khmu village Ban Ka Chait

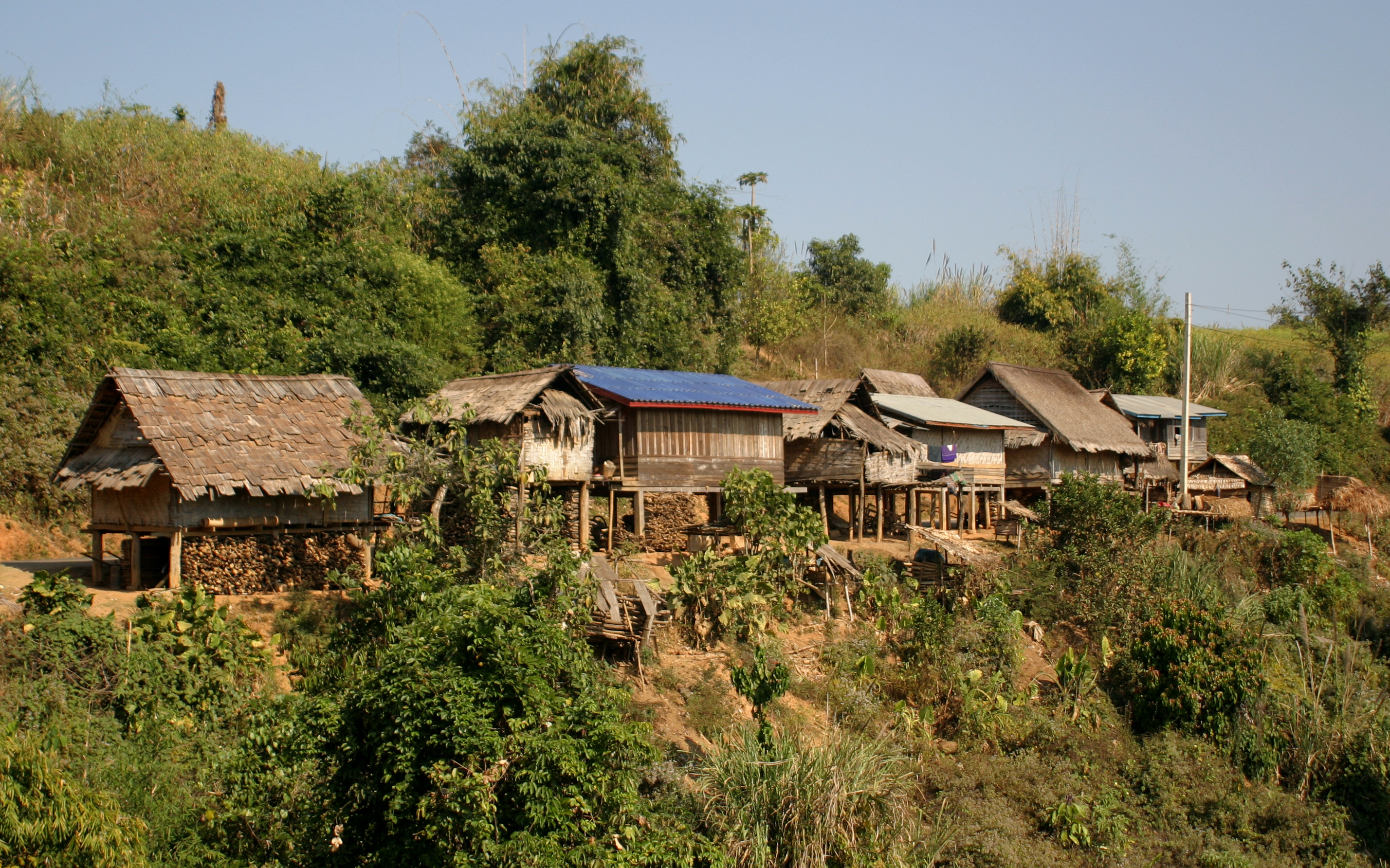
Khmu village Ban Keuocheb

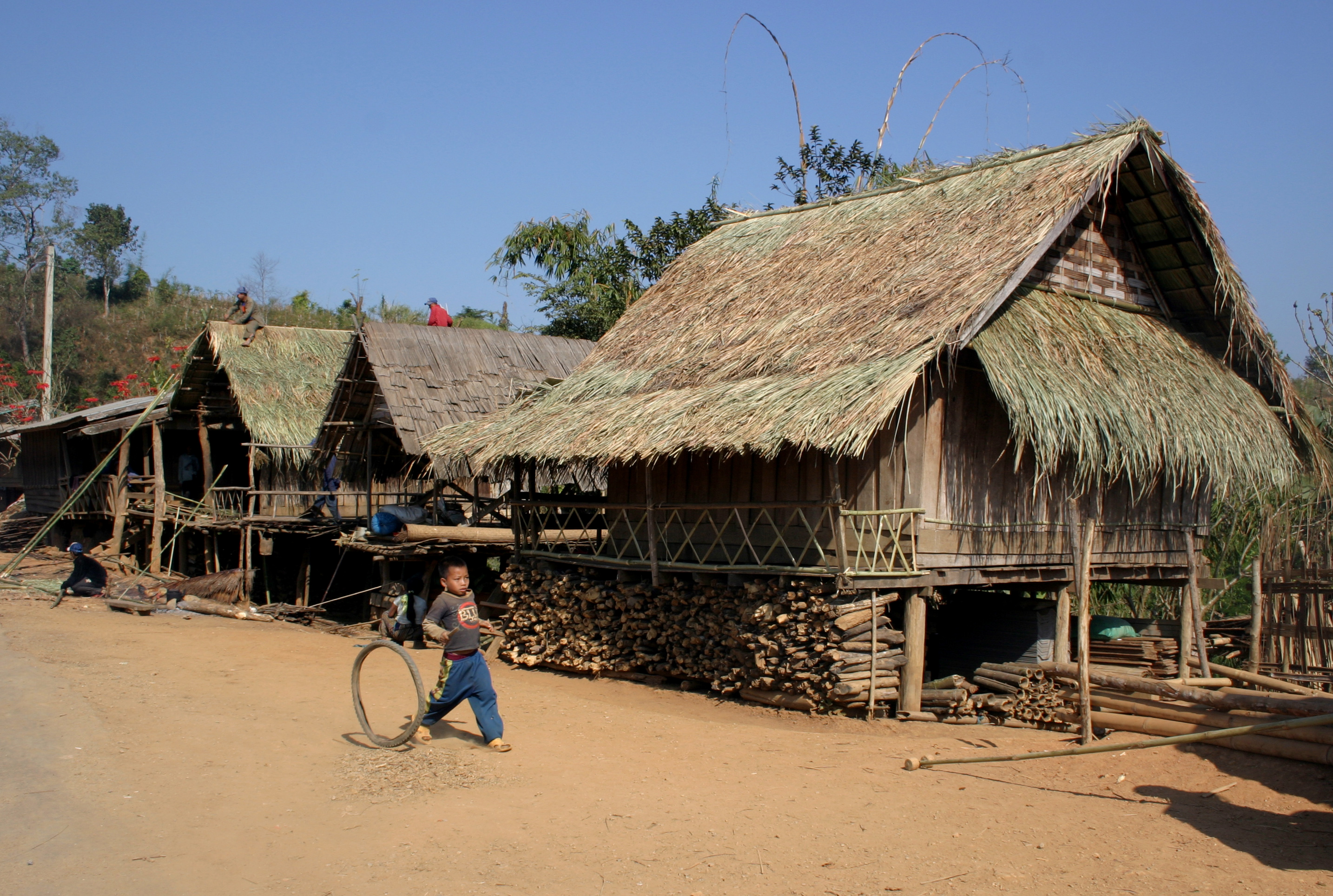
Khmu village Ban Keuocheb

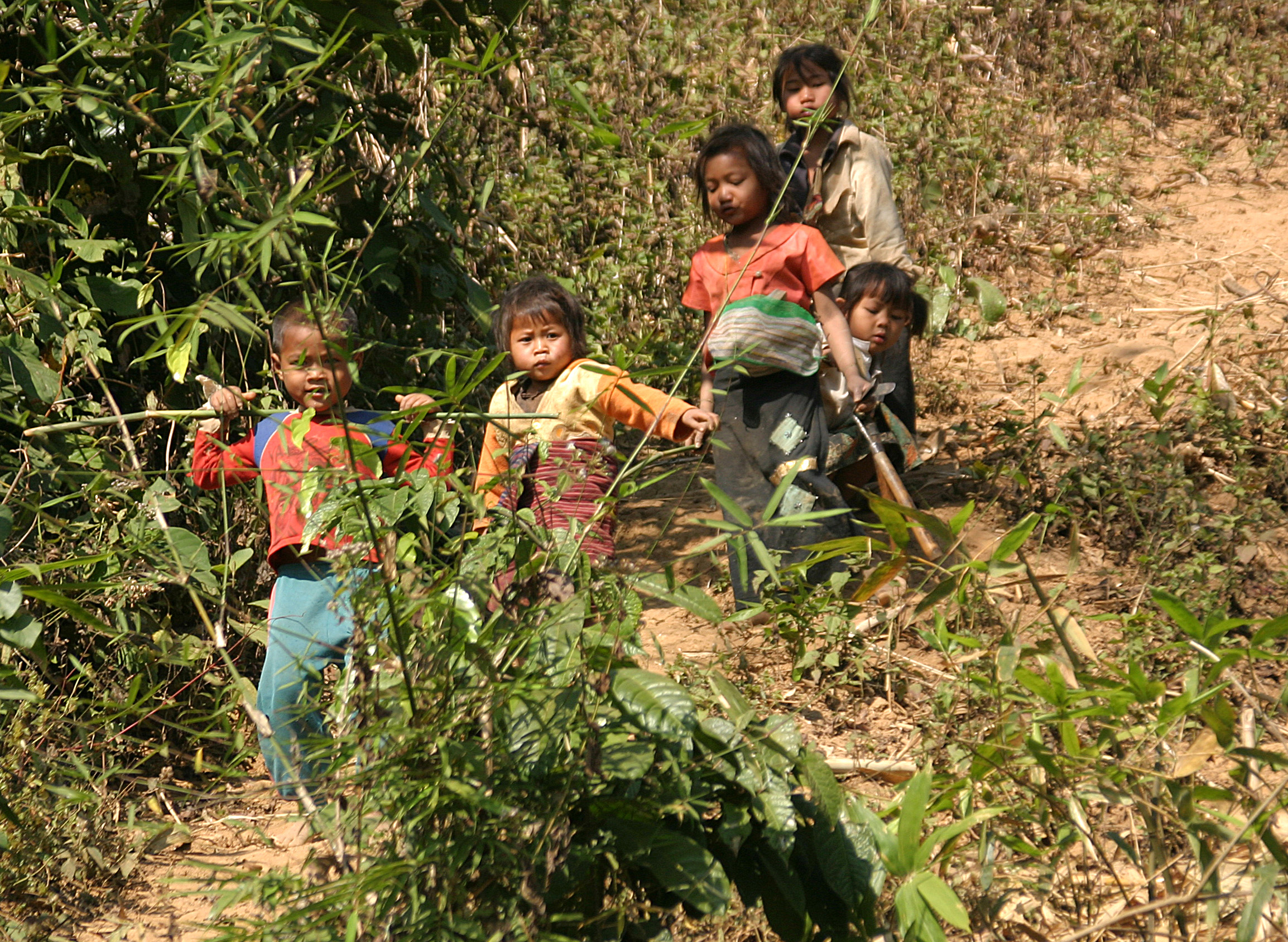
Khmu village Ban Keuocheb

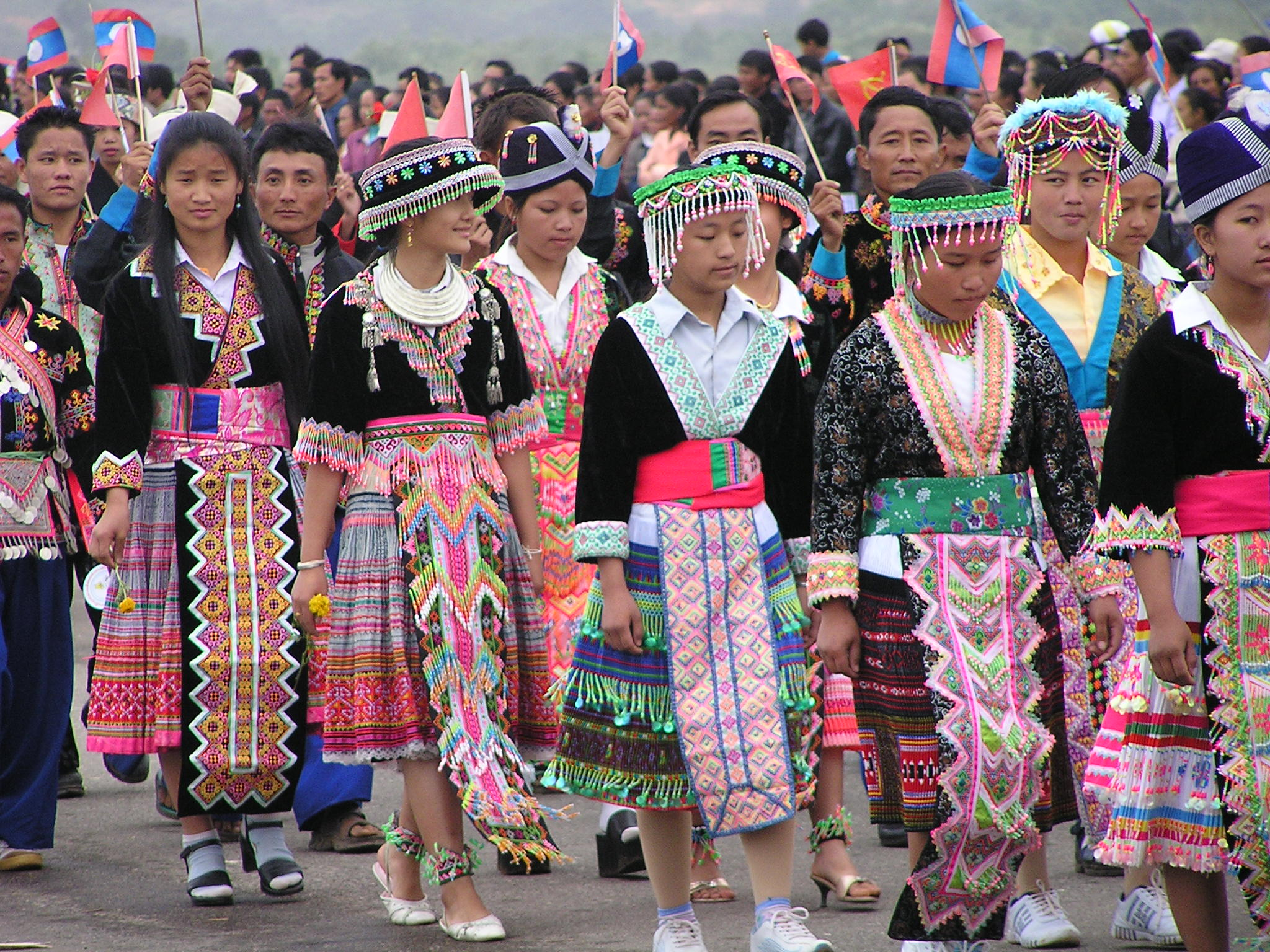
Hmong people in Oudomxay

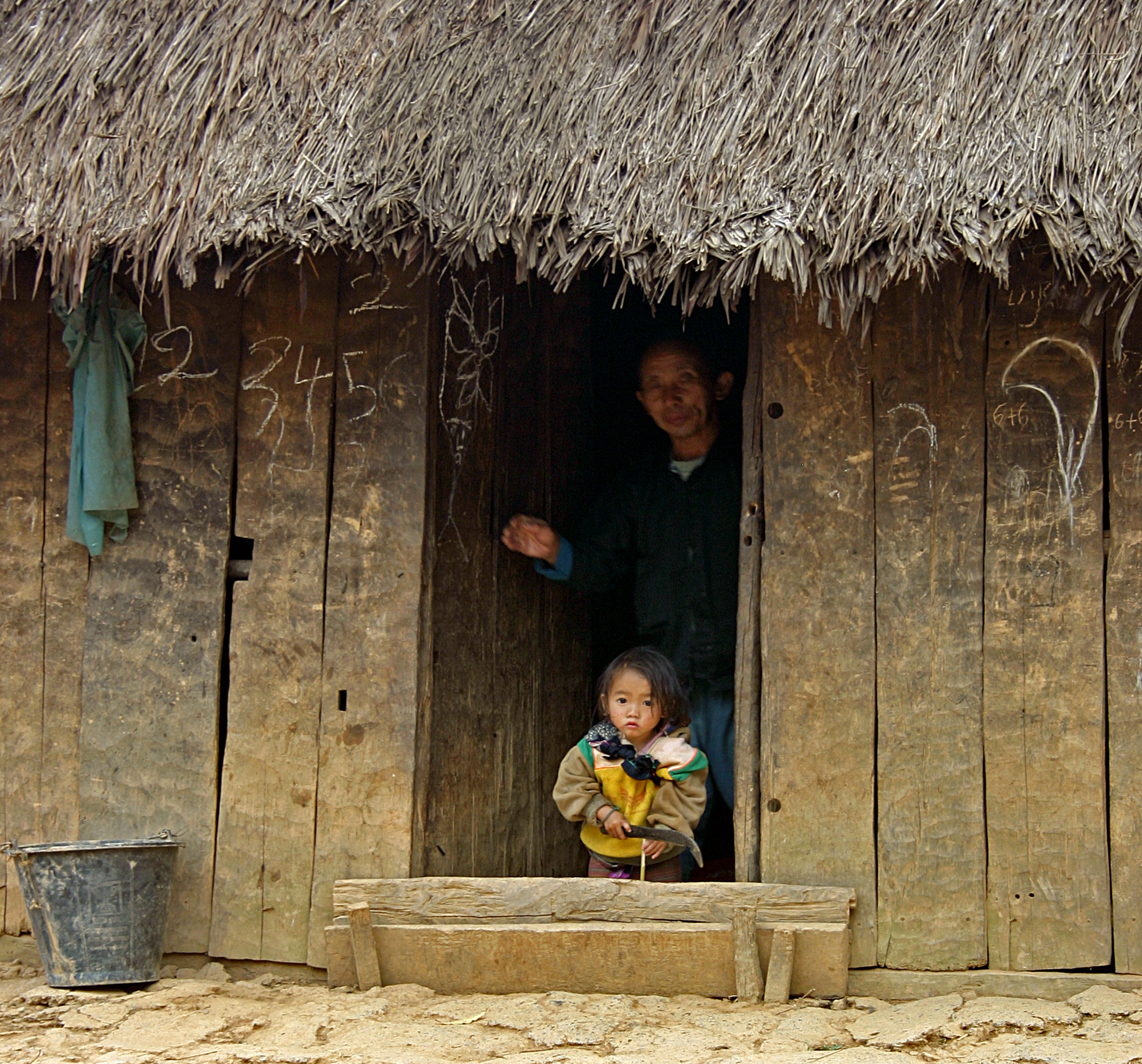
Hmong village Xong Ya

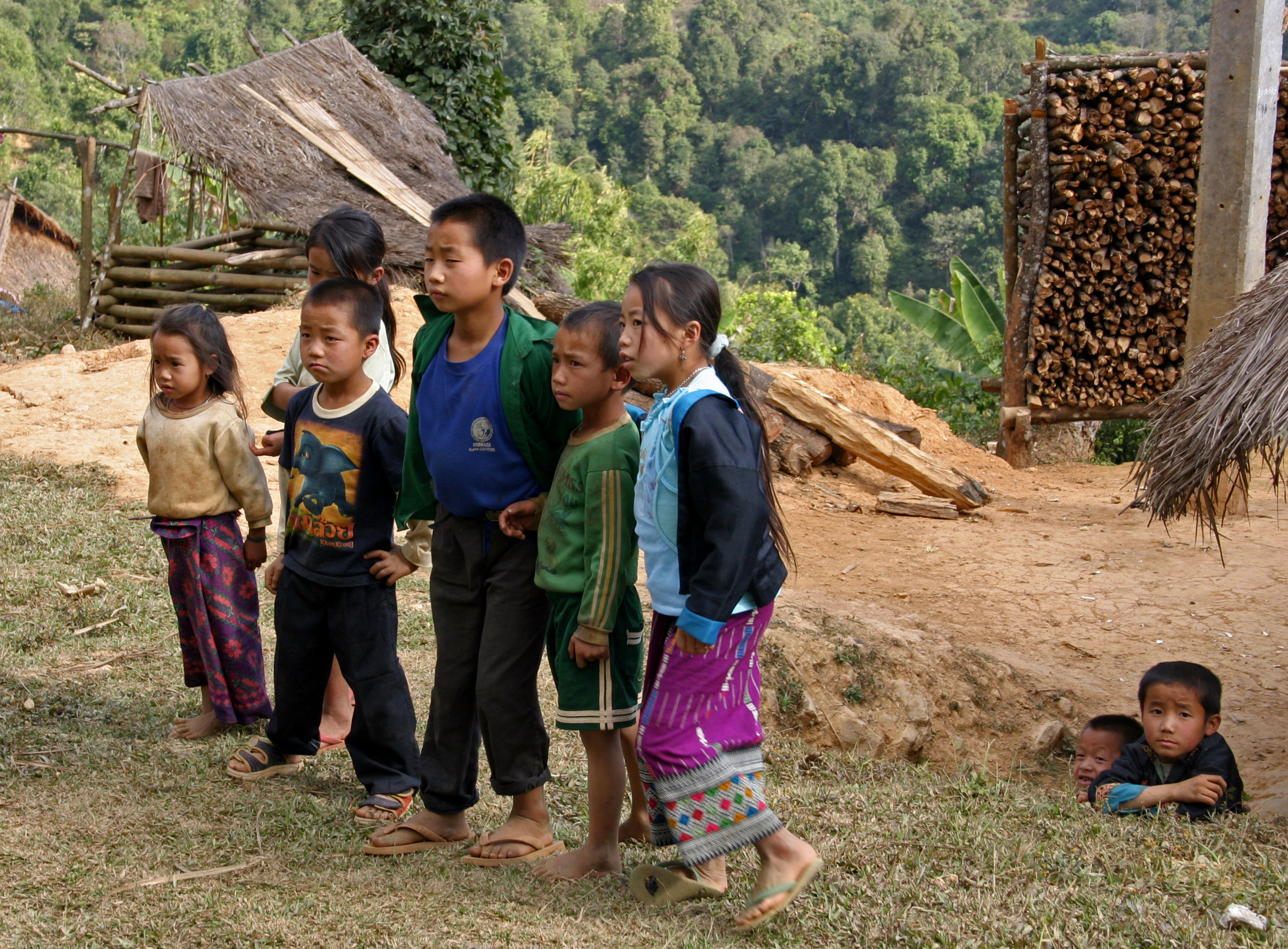
Hmong village Xong Ya

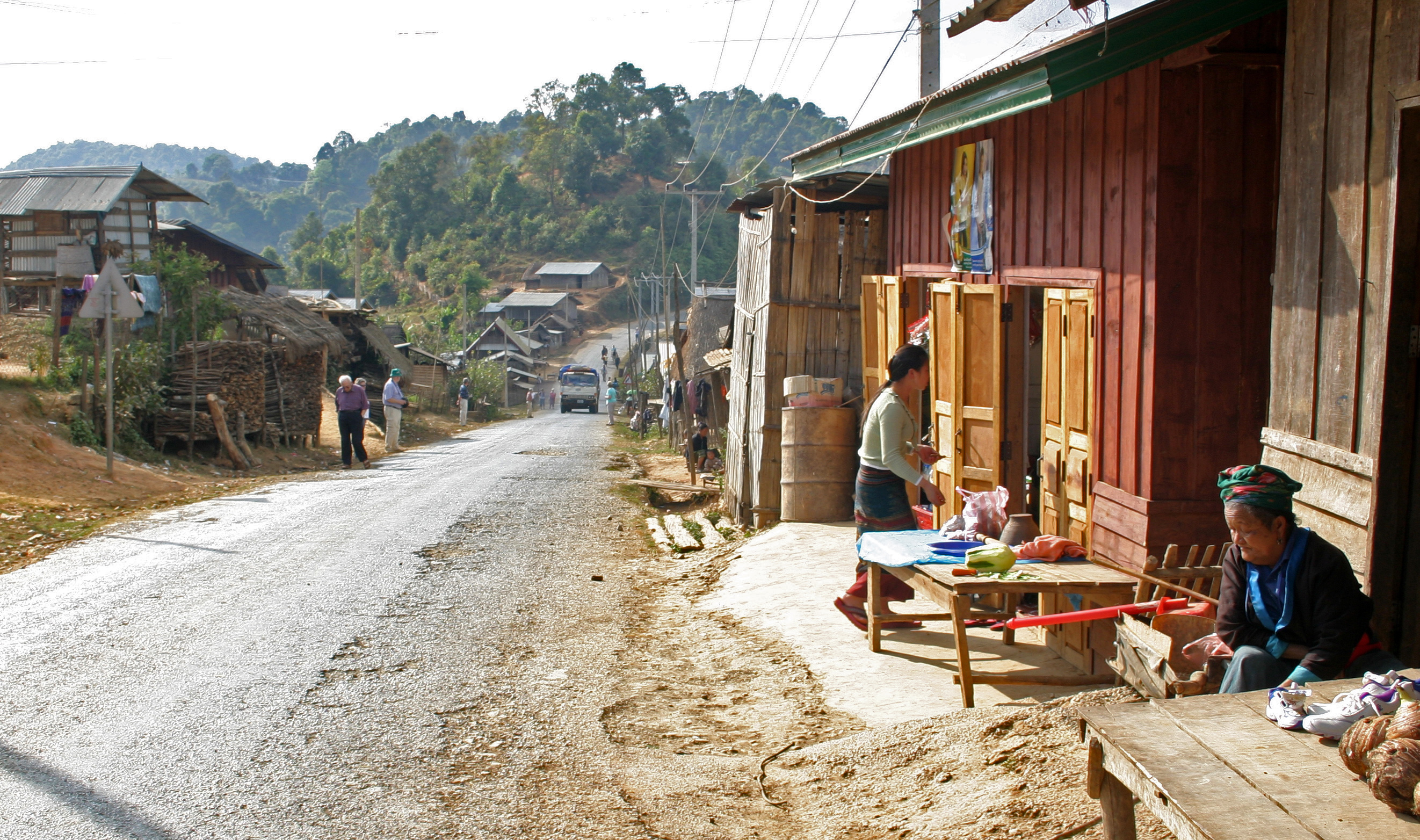
Route 13 in Xong Ya

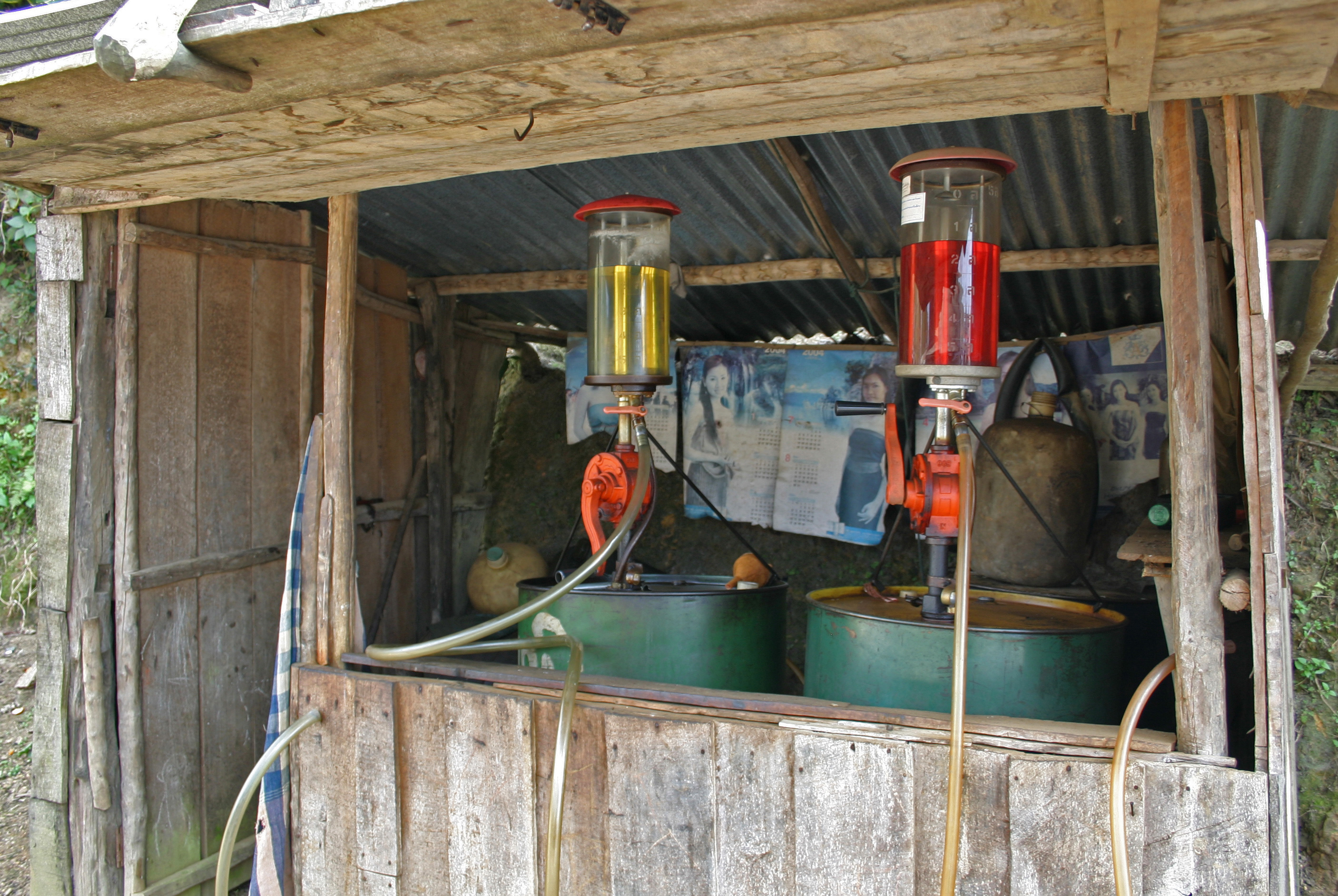
Petrol station in Xong Ya

== Economy ==
Oudomxay has deposits of salt, bronze, zinc, antimony, brown coal, kaolin and iron deposits. Attempts to control poppy cultivation in the province have been made through the Narcotics Crop Control Project, formulated in the 1990s.

Subsistence agriculture

In Oudomxay province, most of the population practices subsistence agriculture. Predominantly "slash-and-burn"-agriculture is used, sometimes linked with growing mountain rice – 45% of rural villages in Oudomxay depend on swidden agriculture, due to the province's mountainous topography. This form of agriculture is more labour-intensive and takes up larger areas of land, as soils need a longer time until their original productivity is recovered. Cropping rice using the wet-field paddy system is just possible in plain lowlands, which in Oudomxay are scarcer. Mountain rice grown at the mountain sides, and most of the cultivable areas in the lowlands are merely irrigated by natural rainfalls. Besides rice, other crops are corn, soybeans, fruits, vegetables, cassava (maniok), sugarcane, tobacco, cotton wool, tea and peanuts. In 2004, approximately 10,000 tons of sugarcane and 45,000 tons of corn were produced. Corn, onions, watermelons and tobacco are exported. In cooperation with international organisations, the government is working to increase production intensity proposing a sustainable usage of natural resources. Besides the use of land for agricultural purposes, approximately 40,000 hectares of land are forested or used as meadows. Livestock breeding, above all of water buffalos, pigs, cattle and chickens, is a component for the livelihood of rural population. According to estimations of the IUCN, approximately 12% of Oudomxay forests are primary forests, 48% secondary forests. For the population, the forests are source of wood and contribute to family incomes providing fruits, herbs and meat. Lao cultivable land is sometimes rented to Chinese, which then is tilled by Chinese migratory labourers.

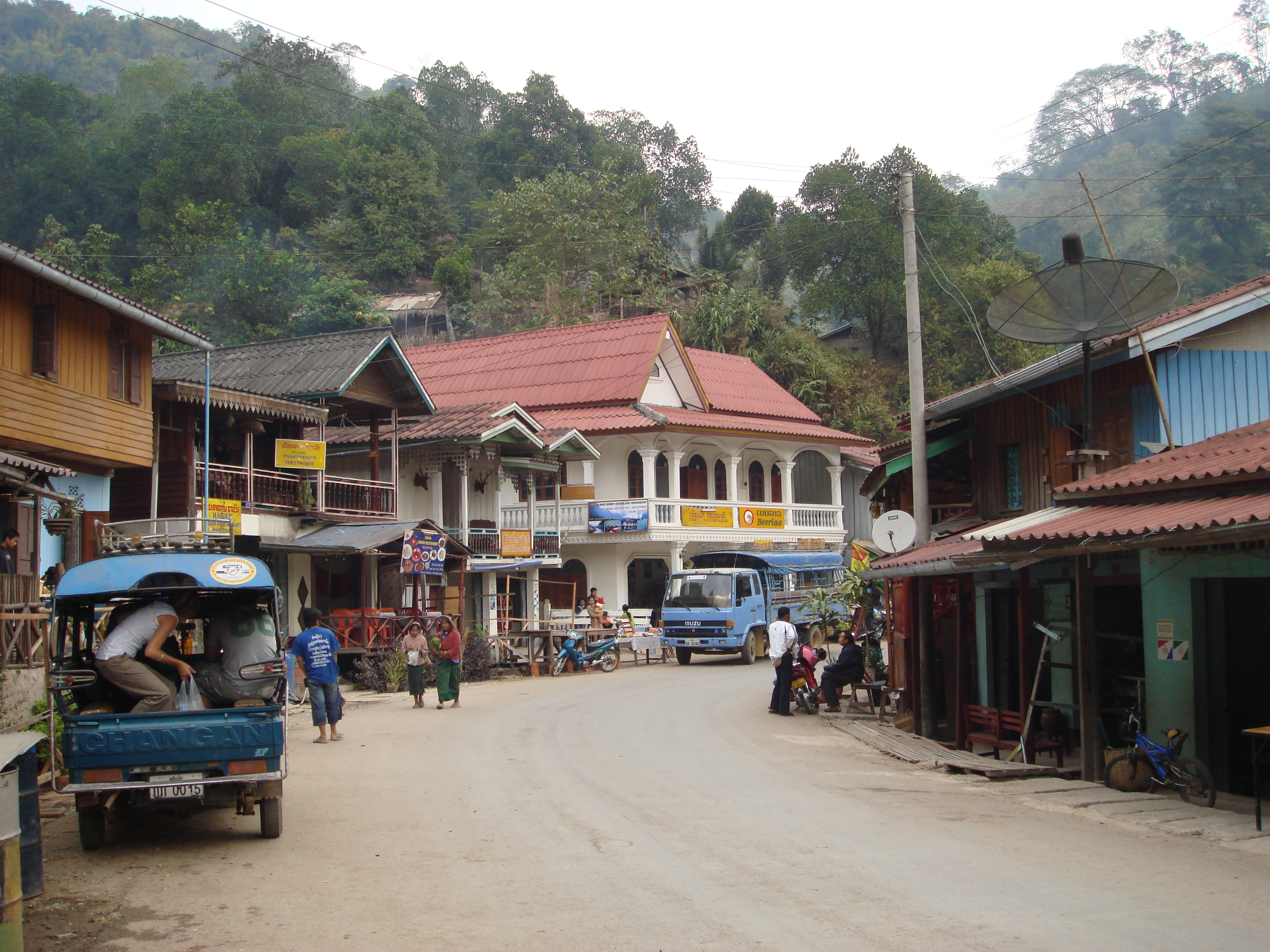
Pak Beng

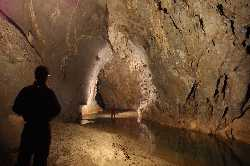
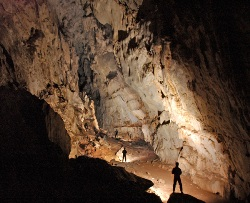
Left: Inside Chom Ong Cave. Right: Passage in Chom Ong Cave, about 35 meters high

Tourism

Since some years, efforts are taken to support tourism in Oudomxay, which is considered a chance to minimize poverty of the population. A tourism office has operated in Muang Xay since 1997, supported by German Development Service (DED) since 2005. The support of DED aims to raise the incomes especially of the rural population and small-scale enterprises by tourism and thereby protect natural resources. In August 2007 the tourism office was upgraded to a “Provincial Tourism Department”. According to the „Statistical Report on Tourism in Laos 2008“ by the „Lao National Tourism Administration“, the number of tourists has increased from approximately 18,600 to 102,000 from 2001 to 2008. According to the statistic, approximately 17% of all 1.7 million tourists visiting Laos in 2008 came to Oudomxay. Oudomxay disposes of eight hotels and approximately 52 guesthouses.

== Landmarks ==
Muang La is a Buddhist pilgrimage for Theravada Buddhists in the province. Saymoungkhoune Rattana Stupa located here has a Buddha image, which is 400 years old and is reported to have supernatural powers.

Chom Ong Cave, the longest cave in Laos, is located in Ban Chom Ong, 45 km to the northwest of Oudomxay town and is the biggest known cave in northern Laos. The cave was explored by a team of cave researchers during 2009, 2010 and 2011 and reported to be 18.4 km long and considered as the second longest in Laos and 9th longest in South East Asia. The average dimensions of the cave is 20–25 m in width and 20–30 m in height. It has two passages, one is a stream and the other has fossils and both connect to a hall which is 100 m long, 30 m wide and of varying height of 30–50 m up to the roof. It has a stream inlet in the north and the stream outflows in the southern end.

During the Indochina war, people of the village, who had till then kept the location of the cave a secret, had to use the cave as bomb shelter, and they thought that their prayers to Buddha had helped to protect them from the bombings. Hence, they named the cave as “Phachao Khamtan” or “Khamtan Buddha” Cave where 'Phachao' means "Buddha" and 'Khamtan' means "Valuable Protective Shield".

== Culture ==
The Baci festival was started before Buddhism made inroads into Laos, as an animist ritual used to celebrate important events and occasions, like births and marriages and entering the monkhood, departing, returning, beginning a new year, and welcoming or bidding etc. It is celebrated throughout Laos as a national festival and in neighbouring Thailand. It is a traditional cult festival in which after offering prayers to Buddha, in a formal gathering people tie a white thread (symbolically representing purity) or string on the wrist of their opposites wishing for their well-being, ward off ill luck and bring them good luck. The ceremony is held as a part of marriage festival or any auspicious occasion in the family when family members get together. The thread can be taken off three days after its tying.

This practice is linked to the belief that Baci is invoked religiously to synchronise the effects of 32 organs of human body considered as kwan (KWA-ang) or spirits or the “components of the soul.” Its observance to establish as social and family bond to maintain “balance and harmony to the individual and community, is done in its original format in Laos, as a substantiation of human existence.”
