= Nhot Ou district =

Coordinates: 22.125°N 101.791°E

Nhot Ou district ເມືອງຍອດອູ
- District
- Interactive map of Nhot Ou district
- Country: Laos
- Province: Phongsaly

Population (2015)
  - Total: 31,145
- Time zone: UTC+7 (ICT)

Nhot Ou (or Yot-Ou) is a district (mueang) of Phongsaly province in northern Laos.
