= Khua district =

Coordinates: 21°04′36″N 102°29′15″E

Khua district ເມືອງຂວາ
- District
- Interactive map of Khua district
- Country: Laos
- Province: Phongsaly

Population
  - Total: 26,164
- Time zone: UTC+7 (ICT)

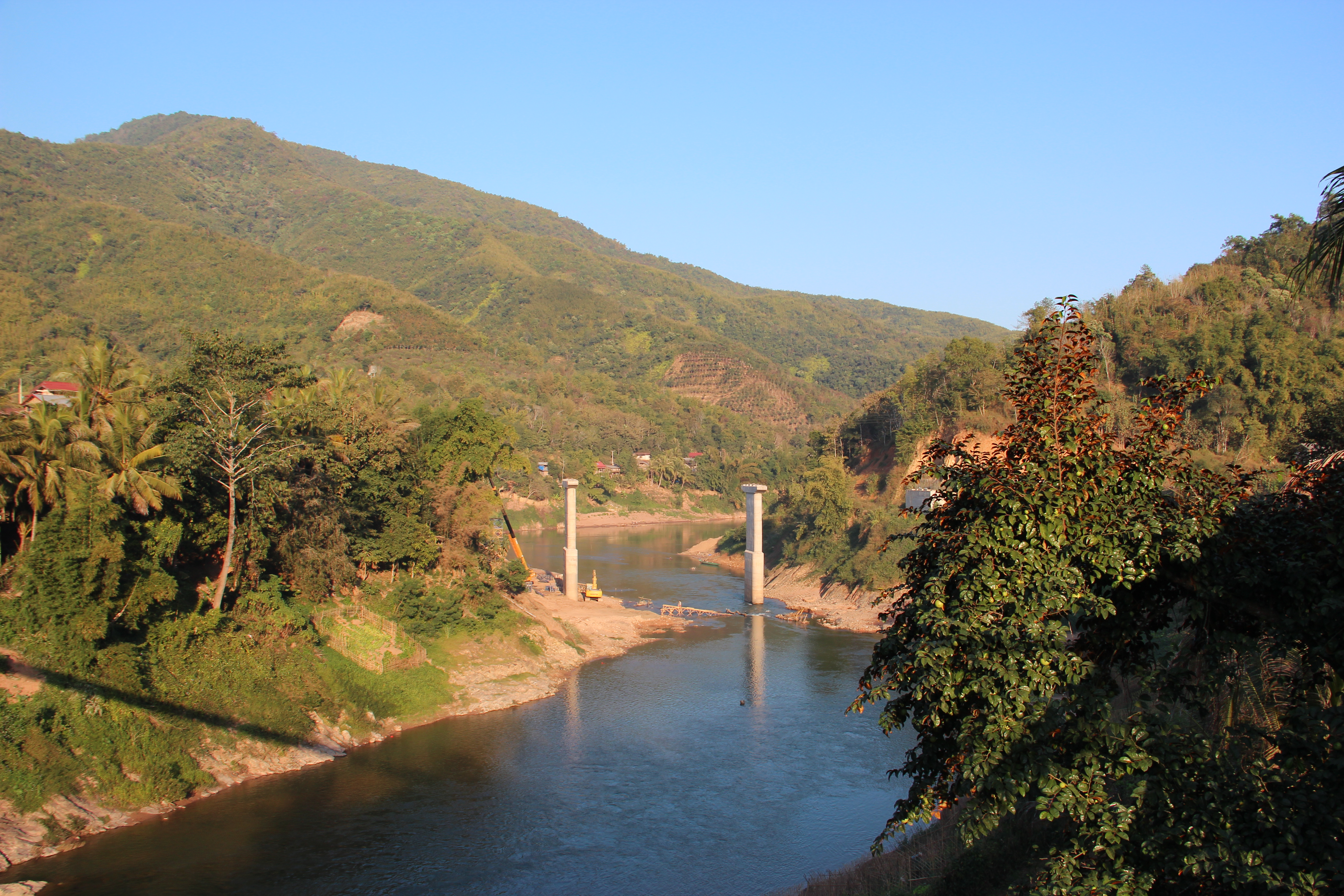
Bridge under construction over the Nam Ou in Muang Khua (Phongsali province, Laos).

Khua is a district (muang) of Phongsaly province in northern Laos.
