= Namor district =

Namor district ເມືອງນາໝໍ້
- District
- Location within Laos
- Country: Laos
- Province: Oudomxay

Population (2015)
  - Total: 38,826
- Time zone: UTC+7 (ICT)

Namor is a district (muang) of Oudomxay province in northwestern Laos.
