= Laopin language =

Loloish language of Yunnan, China

Laopin
- Native to: China
- Native speakers: < 1,000 (2007)
- Language family: Sino-Tibetan: (Tibeto-Burman); Lolo–Burmese; Loloish; Southern; Bisoid; Laopin

Language codes
- ISO 639-3: None (mis)
- Glottolog: None

Laopin (Chinese: 老品) is a Loloish language of Menghai County, Yunnan, China. Laopin is spoken in Manpin (曼品村; or Laopin, 老品), Manhong Village (曼洪村委会), Mengzhe Town (勐遮镇), Menghai County.

There fewer than 1,000 speakers out of 1,300 ethnic members in Menglian County. They are classified as ethnic Dai people by the Chinese government.
