= Boon Neua district =

Boon Neua district ເມືອງບຸນເໜືອ
- District
- Interactive map of Boon Neua district
- Coordinates: 21.68°N 101.87°E
- Country: Laos
- Province: Phongsaly

Population
  - Total: 22,285
- Time zone: UTC+7 (ICT)

Boon Neua is a district (muang) of Phongsaly province in northern Laos.
