= Phongsali =

Phongsali ຜົ້ງສາລີ
- District & municipality
- Phongsali District
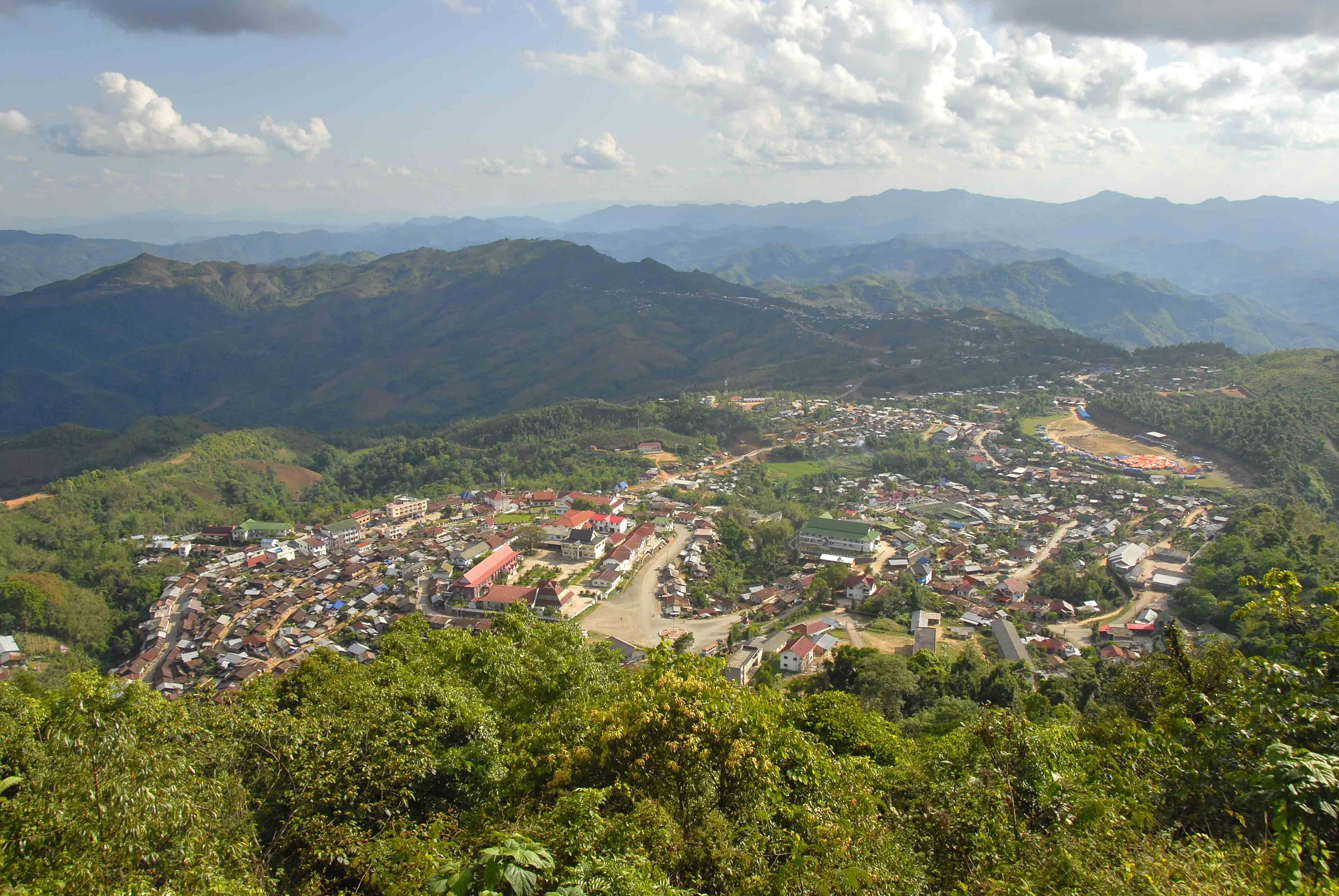

- Location in Laos
- Coordinates: 21°41′N 102°06′E
- Country: Laos
- Admin. division: Phongsaly Province

Population (2015)
  - Total: 23,300
  - Religions: Buddhism
- Time zone: UTC+7 (ICT)

Phongsali or Phongsaly (Lao: ຜົ້ງສາລີ) is the capital of Phongsaly Province, Laos. It is the northernmost provincial capital in Laos.

== Climate ==
Phongsali has a subtropical highland climate (Köppen climate classification: Cwa).

Climate data for Phongsali, elevation 1,300 m (4,300 ft), (1990–2019)
Month	Jan	Feb	Mar	Apr	May	Jun	Jul	Aug	Sep	Oct	Nov	Dec	Year
Mean daily maximum °C (°F)	19.5 (67.1)	22.8 (73.0)	25.8 (78.4)	27.5 (81.5)	27.1 (80.8)	26.5 (79.7)	25.2 (77.4)	25.8 (78.4)	25.4 (77.7)	23.7 (74.7)	21.6 (70.9)	18.8 (65.8)	24.1 (75.5)
Daily mean °C (°F)	15.4 (59.7)	17.8 (64.0)	20.6 (69.1)	22.5 (72.5)	22.6 (72.7)	22.8 (73.0)	22.1 (71.8)	22.4 (72.3)	21.8 (71.2)	20.2 (68.4)	17.8 (64.0)	15.0 (59.0)	20.1 (68.1)
Mean daily minimum °C (°F)	11.3 (52.3)	12.8 (55.0)	15.5 (59.9)	17.4 (63.3)	18.1 (64.6)	19.0 (66.2)	18.9 (66.0)	18.9 (66.0)	18.2 (64.8)	16.6 (61.9)	13.9 (57.0)	11.2 (52.2)	16.0 (60.8)
Average precipitation mm (inches)	37 (1.5)	19 (0.7)	60 (2.4)	100 (3.9)	208 (8.2)	251 (9.9)	372 (14.6)	339 (13.3)	165 (6.5)	96 (3.8)	52 (2.0)	39 (1.5)	1,738 (68.3)
Average relative humidity (%)	80.3	72.7	64.4	69.1	75.3	86.3	88.1	88.9	86.6	86.0	83.9	81.6	80.3
Mean monthly sunshine hours	156.8	166.7	210.5	174.2	191.0	108.8	96.1	98.1	114.4	113.9	153.9	153.1	1,737.5
Source 1: Food and Agriculture Organization of the United Nations
Source 2: SeaDelt (humidity and sun 2016–2022)
