= Boon Tai district =

Boon Tai district ເມືອງບຸນໃຕ້
- District
- Interactive map of Boon Tai district
- Coordinates: 21.39°N 102.06°E
- Country: Laos
- Province: Phongsaly

Population
  - Total: 24,277
- Time zone: UTC+7 (ICT)

Boon Tai is a district (muang) of Phongsaly province in northern Laos.
