= Jiangcheng Hani and Yi Autonomous County =

Jiangcheng County 江城县 · Jalceiq xeif
- Autonomous county
- 江城哈尼族彝族自治县; Jalceiq Haqniqssaq Haqhholssaq Ziiqziifxeif; Jiangcheng Hani and Yi Autonomous County
- Location of Jiangcheng County (red) in Pu'er City (pink) and Yunnan

- Location of the seat in Yunnan
- Coordinates: 22°35′09″N 101°51′44″E
- Country: China
- Province: Yunnan
- Prefecture-level city: Pu'er
- GB/T 2260 CODE: 530826
- County seat: Menglie

Area
  - Total: 3,476 km^{2} (1,342 sq mi)
- Elevation: 1,186 m (3,891 ft)

Population (2020 census)
  - Total: 111,033
  - Density: 31.94/km^{2} (82.73/sq mi)
- Time zone: UTC+8 (China Standard)
- Postal code: 665900
- Area code: 0879
- Website: jcx.gov.cn
- ^{1}Yunnan Statistics Bureau^{2}Puer Gov.^{3}Yunnan Portal

Jiangcheng Hani and Yi Autonomous County (simplified Chinese: 江城哈尼族彝族自治县; traditional Chinese: 江城哈尼族彝族自治縣; pinyin: Jiāngchéng Hānízú Yízú Zìzhìxiàn; Hani: Jalceiq Haqniqssaq Haqhholssaq Ziiqziifxeif) is an autonomous county under the jurisdiction of Pu'er City, in southern Yunnan, China, bordering Laos to the south and Vietnam to the southeast. It is one of the two counties in the province to border more than one country, the other being Mengla County which borders Laos and Myanmar. By road, its seat, the town of Menglie (勐烈镇), is 520 km (320 mi) from Kunming and 145 km (90 mi) from Simao District, the municipal seat of Pu'er.

== Geography and climate ==
Jiangcheng is located in the south of Pu'er City in southern Yunnan. It borders Jinghong and Mengla County to the southwest, Lüchun County to the east, Mojiang County and Ning'er County to the north, and Simao District to the west. It also borders Vietnam (Muong Te District of Lai Châu Province and Muong Nhe District of Dien Bien Province) to the southeast and Laos (Yot Ou District of Phongsali Province to the south.

Jiangcheng has latitude range of 22°20'−22°36' N and longitude range of 101°14'−102°19' E. Its seat, the town of Menglie (勐烈镇), has an elevation of 1,119 m (3,671 ft). Located at an altitude of above 1,100 m (3,600 ft), Jiangcheng, as with much of southern Yunnan, has a warm humid subtropical climate (Köppen Cwa), with muddled distinction between the seasons and daytime temperatures remaining warm year-round. Highs peak in April and May before the core of the rainy season and reach a minimum in December; however, the warmest and coolest months are June and December, respectively at 22.8 °C (73.0 °F) and 13.1 °C (55.6 °F); the annual mean is 18.75 °C (65.8 °F). June thru September accounts for nearly 70% of the annual rainfall of 2,253.3 mm (89 in) and during this time, some rainfall occurs on most days.

Climate data for Jiangcheng, elevation 1,121 m (3,678 ft), (1991–2020 normals, extremes 1971–present)
Month	Jan	Feb	Mar	Apr	May	Jun	Jul	Aug	Sep	Oct	Nov	Dec	Year
Record high °C (°F)	27.8 (82.0)	30.7 (87.3)	33.0 (91.4)	34.1 (93.4)	34.4 (93.9)	32.5 (90.5)	32.4 (90.3)	32.8 (91.0)	32.1 (89.8)	30.5 (86.9)	29.1 (84.4)	26.8 (80.2)	34.4 (93.9)
Mean daily maximum °C (°F)	20.4 (68.7)	23.1 (73.6)	26.3 (79.3)	28.3 (82.9)	28.3 (82.9)	27.8 (82.0)	27.2 (81.0)	27.7 (81.9)	27.2 (81.0)	25.2 (77.4)	22.9 (73.2)	20.2 (68.4)	25.4 (77.7)
Daily mean °C (°F)	13.3 (55.9)	14.7 (58.5)	17.7 (63.9)	20.5 (68.9)	22.1 (71.8)	23.0 (73.4)	22.7 (72.9)	22.6 (72.7)	21.7 (71.1)	19.7 (67.5)	16.5 (61.7)	13.7 (56.7)	19.0 (66.3)
Mean daily minimum °C (°F)	9.4 (48.9)	9.8 (49.6)	12.4 (54.3)	15.4 (59.7)	18.3 (64.9)	20.4 (68.7)	20.4 (68.7)	20.0 (68.0)	18.9 (66.0)	16.9 (62.4)	13.1 (55.6)	10.3 (50.5)	15.4 (59.8)
Record low °C (°F)	−0.7 (30.7)	3.4 (38.1)	0.7 (33.3)	8.2 (46.8)	12.3 (54.1)	13.0 (55.4)	15.3 (59.5)	14.9 (58.8)	10.3 (50.5)	5.7 (42.3)	3.3 (37.9)	−0.7 (30.7)	−0.7 (30.7)
Average precipitation mm (inches)	38.2 (1.50)	30.4 (1.20)	49.9 (1.96)	98.1 (3.86)	246.4 (9.70)	337.3 (13.28)	486.2 (19.14)	402.3 (15.84)	259.7 (10.22)	159.8 (6.29)	77.4 (3.05)	39.1 (1.54)	2,224.8 (87.58)
Average precipitation days (≥ 0.1 mm)	5.1	4.9	6.4	11.3	18.8	24.4	26.8	24.9	19.8	14.6	8.3	5.8	171.1
Average relative humidity (%)	83	77	74	75	81	85	88	87	86	86	85	85	83
Mean monthly sunshine hours	168.8	190.1	190.7	199.5	178.0	112.6	96.3	115.7	130.0	129.3	159.5	150.1	1,820.6
Percentage possible sunshine	50	59	51	52	43	28	23	29	36	36	48	45	42
Source 1: China Meteorological Administrationall-time November high
Source 2: Weather China

== Administrative divisions ==
Jiangcheng Hani and Yi Autonomous County has 5 towns and 2 townships.

5 towns

- Menglie (勐烈镇)
- Zhengdong (整董镇)
- Qushui (曲水镇)
- Baozang (宝藏镇)
- Kangping (康平镇)

2 townships

- Guoqing (国庆乡)
- Jiahe (嘉禾乡)

== Ethnic groups ==
The Jiangcheng County Gazetteer (1989:351–368) lists the following ethnic subgroups, as well as locations.

- Yi
  - Luoluo 倮倮 (Gaisu 改苏 branch)
  - Xiangtang 香堂 (Lalu 腊鲁 branch)
  - Alu 阿鲁 (Lalu 腊鲁 branch)
  - Laowu 老乌/Lawu 拉乌: (Awu 阿武 branch)
  - Azong 阿宗 (allonym for an Yi subgroup)
  - Menghua 蒙化
- Dai
  - Dry Dai 旱傣: Mankelao 曼克老, Zhongping 中坪, Basan 坝伞
  - Water Dai 水傣: Zhengdong township 整董乡
  - Flowery-Waist Dai 花腰傣: Shuicheng township 水城乡
  - White Dai 白傣: Baliu 坝溜, Lazhu township 拉朱乡 and Tukahe 土卡河, Longtan township 龙塘乡
- Yao: pop. 2,965 (1986)
- Lahu: pop. 1,321 (1986)
  - Banhe Lahu Ethnic Township 板河拉祜族乡
  - Chashulin 茶树林, Gale Township 嘎勒乡

=== Hani ===
Hani subgroups in Jiangcheng County are (Jiangcheng County Gazetteer 1989:351):

- Hani
  - Biyue 碧约 branch
  - Kaduo 卡多 branch
  - Kabie 卡别 branch
- Enu branch 哦怒
  - Ximoluo 西摩洛
- Haoni branch 豪尼
  - Baihong 白宏
  - Bukong 布孔 (also called Mahei 麻黑)
  - Budu 布都 (also called Asuo 阿梭, Duota 堕塔, Duota Asuo 堕塔阿梭)
  - Asuo 阿梭
  - Duota 多塔
- Hani branch 哈尼
  - Qidi 期弟
  - Lami 腊米

Other names for the Hani include:

- Baike 白壳
- Benren 本人
- Aka 阿卡
- Podu 颇都
- Mahei 麻黑
- Woni 窝尼
