= Lami language =

Loloish language of Yunnan, China

Lami
- Native to: China
- Region: Yunnan
- Ethnicity: 80,000 Hani (1990)
- Language family: Sino-Tibetan: (Tibeto-Burman); Lolo–Burmese; Loloish; Southern?; Hani?; Lami

Language codes
- ISO 639-3: None (mis)
- Glottolog: lami1239

Lami (autonym: la21 mi55 in Honghe County, meaning 'low status'; Chinese: 腊米) is a Loloish language of Yunnan, China. Lami is spoken in Jiangcheng Hani and Yi Autonomous County, Mojiang Hani Autonomous County, Jinping Miao, Yao, and Dai Autonomous County, and Honghe County. Lami is also spoken in Hade 哈德, Sanmeng Township 三猛乡, Lüchun County.

The Lami language has been documented by Zhang (1998) and Wang (2011).

== Distribution ==
In Mojiang County, Lami is spoken by a total of 3,105 people in the following townships (Yang & Zhang 2010:9).

- Naha Township 那哈乡 (1,844 persons)
- Longtan Township 龙潭乡 (446 persons)
- Yutang Township 渔塘乡 (415 persons)
- Baliu Township 坝溜乡 (312 persons)
- Tongguan Town 联珠镇 (88 persons)

Lefèvre-Pontalis (1892) reports the presence of Lami in Xieng-Hung (Jinghong), and provides a word list for Lami as well.

 Lami is also spoken in Yuanyang County, Yunnan (in Habo 哈播村,[5] Ning'er Hani and Yi Autonomous County and northern Vietnam. Some Lami are classified as Yi.
