= Suobi language =

Southern Loloish language of Yunnan, China

Suobi
- Native to: China
- Region: Yunnan
- Ethnicity: Hani
- Language family: Sino-Tibetan: (Tibeto-Burman); Lolo–Burmese; Loloish; Southern; Hani; Hao-Bai; Suobi

Language codes
- ISO 639-3: None (mis)
- Glottolog: None

Suobi 梭比 is a Southern Loloish language of south-central Yunnan, China. It is documented in Bai (2010). Suobi is closely related to Haoni.

== Distribution ==
Suobi is spoken in 2 villages of Yinyuan Township 因远镇 of Yuanjiang County, namely Pugui Village 浦贵村 (in Pugui 浦贵, Ga'e 嘎俄, and Puhai 浦海) and Beize Village 北泽村 (in Yuga 玉嘎, Sanlingsan 三零三, Shuitong 水桶, and Beize 北泽) (Bai 2010:118).

Suobi speakers in Yinyuan Township 因远镇 are surrounded by Baihong and Haoni speakers (Bai 2010).

Suobi is also spoken in Xinping Yi and Dai Autonomous County (in Meiziqing 梅子箐 of Jianxing 建兴乡, and Dazhai 大寨 of Fuxing 复兴).
