= Amu language =

Southern Loloish language of Yunnan, China

Amu
- Native to: China
- Region: Yunnan
- Ethnicity: Hani
- Language family: Sino-Tibetan: (Tibeto-Burman); Lolo–Burmese; Loloish; Southern; Hani; Hao-Bai; Amu

Language codes
- ISO 639-3: None (mis)
- Glottolog: None

Amu (Chinese: 阿母, 阿木) is a Southern Loloish language of Mojiang Hani Autonomous County, Yunnan, China.

Yang Meiqiong (2014) contains a vocabulary and phrase list of Amu transcribed using Hani orthography.

== Distribution ==
In Mojiang County, Amu is spoken by a total of 7,050 people in the following townships (Yang & Zhang 2010:9).

- Sinanjiang Township 泗南江乡 (4,001 persons), with more than half of all Amu living in Qian'gang Village 千岗村 and Ganba Village 干坝村 according to Yang (2014:1).
- Longtan Township 龙潭乡 (998 persons)
- Baliu Township 坝溜乡 (945 persons)
- Yayi Township 雅邑乡 (451 persons)
- Wenwu Township 文武乡 (125 persons)
