= Khabi language =

Loloish language spoken in China

Khabi
- Kabie
- Native to: China
- Region: Yunnan
- Language family: Sino-Tibetan: (Tibeto-Burman); Lolo–Burmese; Loloish; Southern; Hani; Khabi

Language codes
- ISO 639-3: None (mis)
- Glottolog: khab1234

Khabi, also rendered Kabie (from Chinese: 卡别), is a Southern Loloish language of Yunnan, China. Kabie is spoken in Jiangcheng Hani and Yi Autonomous County, Mojiang Hani Autonomous County, and Lüchun County.

Khabi word lists transcribed using the Roman-based Hani orthography are provided in Minta (2013) and Luo & Minta (2016).

== Distribution ==
Kabie (Khabi) is spoken in:

- Xiqi 西歧村, Sinanjiang Township, Mojiang County, Yunnan, China
- Cuoluo, Cuoluo Village, Daheishan Township, Lüchun County, Yunnan, China 绿春县大黑山乡撮芦村撮芦组 (or 撮洛村)
- Dadifang, Gejie Village, Jiahe Township, Jiangcheng County, Yunnan, China 江城县加禾乡隔界村大地房
- Shipingzhai, Nanwang Village, Jiahe Township, Jiangcheng County, Yunnan, China 江城县加禾乡南旺村石屏寨
