= Bukong language =

Southern Loloish language of Yunnan, China

Bukong
- Native to: China
- Region: Yunnan
- Ethnicity: Hani
- Language family: Sino-Tibetan: (Tibeto-Burman); Lolo–Burmese; Loloish; Southern; Hani; Hao-Bai; Bukong

Language codes
- ISO 639-3: None (mis)
- Glottolog: None

Bukong (Chinese: 布孔) is a Southern Loloish language of Yunnan, China. Bukong is spoken in Jiangcheng Hani and Yi Autonomous County, Mojiang Hani Autonomous County, and Zhenyuan Yi, Hani and Lahu Autonomous County.
