= Duoni language =

Southern Loloish language of Yunnan, China

Duoni
- Native to: China
- Region: Yunnan
- Ethnicity: Hani
- Language family: Sino-Tibetan: (Tibeto-Burman); Lolo–Burmese; Loloish; Southern; Hani; Hao-Bai; Duoni

Language codes
- ISO 639-3: None (mis)
- Glottolog: None

Duoni (Chinese: 多尼) is a Southern Loloish language of Yunnan, China. Duoni is spoken in Jinping Miao, Yao, and Dai Autonomous County and Yuanyang County, Yunnan.

== Distribution ==
In Yuanyang County, the Duoni people are found in the townships of Niujiaozhai 牛角寨 and Zha'e 扎俄. In Jinping County, Duoni are located in Laojizhai Township 老集寨乡 (in the village clusters 行政村 of Masasi 马撒斯, Bailezhai 白乐寨, and Dazhupeng 大竹棚), comprising 793 households and 3,329 persons as of 2005.
