= Alu language (Sino-Tibetan) =

Sino-Tibetan language spoken in Yunnan Province, China

Alu
- Native to: China and Laos
- Region: Yunnan
- Language family: Sino-Tibetan: (Tibeto-Burman); Lolo–Burmese; Loloish; (unclassified); Alu

Language codes
- ISO 639-3: None (mis)
- Glottolog: None

Alu (Chinese: 阿鲁) is an unclassified Loloish language of Yunnan, China. It is spoken in Jinping Miao, Yao, and Dai Autonomous County, Lüchun County, Jiangcheng Hani and Yi Autonomous County, and Yuanyang County, Yunnan. The Alu are also referred to by other ethnic groups as Luwu 鲁乌 or Luowu 倮乌. There are also 500 to 600 Alu people in two villages of Yot Ou District, Phongsali Province, Laos.

The Alu also have a mouth organ with five pipes that they play during the "Abei festival 阿卑节" ("maiden festival").

== Classification ==
Hsiu (2017) suggests that Alu may be related to Lalo, but that this is uncertain due to the lack of data.

== Distribution ==
In Jinping County, Alu is spoken in Yakouzhe Village, Laojizhai Township, (in the villages of Luopan, Tiantou, Huilongzhai, Laozhai, Zhongzhai Xihadi, Heishan, Amilong, Kabianzhai, Anlezhai, Nanlu, etc.) (Jinping County Ethnic Gazetteer 2013:101). There are 1,264 households and 5,307 persons as of 2005.

In Yuanyang County, Alu is spoken in Xinjie Town and Hama Village of Huangcaoling Township. Alu is also spoken in Dashuigou, Lüchun County.

The autonym of the Luowu (罗武) in Xinping County is ni³³su³³pʰo³³. In 1955, they had an estimated population of 300, plus about 100 households in Shuangbai County, and some in Zhenyuan County.

There are also 4,000 Alu in Vietnam.
