= Duota language =

Southern Loloish language of Yunnan, China

Duota
- Native to: China
- Region: Yunnan
- Ethnicity: 10,000 Hani (1996)
- Language family: Sino-Tibetan: (Tibeto-Burman); Lolo–Burmese; Loloish; Southern; Duota

Language codes
- ISO 639-3: None (mis)
- Glottolog: None

Duota (Chinese: 多塔) is a Southern Loloish language of Yunnan, China. Duota is spoken in Jiangcheng Hani and Yi Autonomous County, Xinping Yi and Dai Autonomous County, and Yuanjiang Hani, Yi and Dai Autonomous County.

In Yuanjiang County, Duota is spoken in Mili 咪哩乡 and Yangchajie 羊岔街乡 townships (Yuxi 1992:97). Duota is classified as a Haoni language in Yuxi (1992:97), along with Asuo and Budu of Yinyuan Town 因远镇. Li & Minta (2016:157-182) classify the Duota language of Mili Village, Mili Township 咪哩乡, Yuanjiang County as belonging to the Haoni-Baihong language cluster, and include a word list of Duota transcribed using Chinese characters. The Duota are separate from the Duoke 堕课 people of the two hamlets of Xiaogancha 小甘岔 and Xinzhai 新寨 villages near Mili Village 咪哩村 (Li & Minta 2016:8).
