= Habei language =

Southern Loloish language

Habei
- Native to: China
- Region: Yunnan
- Ethnicity: Hani
- Language family: Sino-Tibetan: Tibeto-Burman; Lolo–Burmese; Loloish; Southern; Bisoid; Habei

Language codes
- ISO 639-3: None (mis)
- Glottolog: None

Habei (Chinese: 哈备; also known as Mani 玛尼) is a Southern Loloish language of Yunnan, China. Hsiu (2018) suggests that Habei belongs to the Bisoid branch.

== Background ==
Habei is spoken in only one village, namely Habei village 哈备村, Zhemi Township 者米乡, Jinping Miao, Yao, and Dai Autonomous County, Yunnan (Jinping County Ethnic Gazetteer 2013:89, 101). The Habei people refer to their village as Kuang An (况安), meaning 'old village' (< kuang 'village' + an 'old').

The Habei still preserve traditional animist rituals.

The Habei language has been documented by Yan (1995) and He & Liu (2011).

== Names ==
Autonyms and exonyms for the Habei are as follows (Yan 1995:60).

- autonym: ma³³nɛ³³ (蛮尼)
- Yao exonym: ta⁵⁵ka³³ (单嘎)
- Lahu exonym: xa⁴²pe⁵⁵ (哈背)
- Miao exonym: xa³³pe⁵³ (哈备)
- Zhuang exonym: je³³u⁵⁵ (牙乌)
- Hani exonym: xa³³pi⁵⁵, xa³³bø⁵⁵ (哈备)

== Phonology ==
Habei has 32 onsets and 62 rimes (Yan 1995:67). The consonant inventory is similar to that of standard Hani of Lüchun County, but also has /f/ and /v/, which Lüchun Hani does not have. Final consonants are -p, -t, -k, -m, -n, and -ŋ.

There are 6 tones. In songs, only 4 tones are recognizable (Yan 1995:67).

== Phrase examples ==
The following Habei phrase examples are from Yan (1995:69-70). Adjectives follow head nouns.

tɕen55 ɲi323 lum24
bowl two CL
Two bowls

ɣa33 sum55 na55
chicken three CL
Three chickens

{kʰɤ tɕʰɔ33} ŋa24 tɕuŋ55
shoe five pair
Five pairs of shoes

na33 ŋɤ33 tɕʰɛ323ma33
2SG POS hoe
Your hoe

ja33tɕʰa323 ŋɤ33 a33xɤn33
friend POS sound
Friend's voice

== Sentence examples ==
The following Habei sentence examples are from Yan (1995:68-69). Habei has SOV word order.

ŋa33 xaŋ24 iaŋ24
1SG rice eat
I eat rice.

na33 ti33kʰa55 taŋ55
2SG liquor drink
You drink liquor.

ŋa33 ja33pjɔ55 sum55 jo33 tɕa55
1SG children three CL have
I have three children.

na33 jɔ55ka55 tɕʰa55 xa33lo323 lo33 tɕa55
2SG household people how.many CL have
How many people does your household have?

ja33 la55 a323 la55
3SG come NEG come
Is he coming?

ve323 le33 ɣa33 lɔ323 dʑɛ323za323a55 bɤ33
pig and chicken both livestock PRT
Pigs and chickens are both domestic livestock.
