= Nuomei language =

Language

Nuomei
- Lomei
- Native to: China
- Region: Yunnan
- Language family: Sino-Tibetan: (Tibeto-Burman); Lolo–Burmese; Loloish; Southern; Hani; Nuomei

Language codes
- ISO 639-3: None (mis)
- Glottolog: None

Nuomei (Chinese: 糯美; autonym: lo33 mɛ21) is a Southern Loloish language of Yunnan, China. Nuomei is spoken in Yuanjiang Hani, Yi and Dai Autonomous County, and Jinping Miao, Yao, and Dai Autonomous County.

== Names ==
According to Yunnan (1955), the Nuomei 糯美 (lo³³mɛ²¹) of Xinping County are referred to by the Han Chinese as Suobi 梭比 (which has derogatory meanings), and prefer to be referred to as Nuomei 糯美. The Nuomei refer to the neighboring Nuobi 糯比 as Big Nuobi 大糯比.

== Distribution ==
Dai (2009) reports that ethnic Hani in Yangjie Township 羊街乡, Yuanjiang County belong to the Nuomei 糯美 and Nuobi 糯比 subgroups, who number 9,000 people and 6,000 people respectively in the township. The Nuomei live mostly in Gedie 戈垤, Dangduo 党舵, and Bamu 坝木 administrative villages, while the Nuobi reside mostly in Langzhi 朗支, Yangjie 羊街, and Diexia 垤霞 villages.
