= Budu language (China) =

Language of China

Budu
- Native to: China
- Region: Yunnan
- Ethnicity: 10,000 Hani (1998)
- Language family: Sino-Tibetan: (Tibeto-Burman); Lolo–Burmese; Loloish; Southern; Hani; Hao-Bai; Budu

Language codes
- ISO 639-3: –
- Glottolog: None

Budu (Chinese: 布都) is a Southern Loloish language of Yunnan, China. Budu is spoken in Jiangcheng Hani and Yi Autonomous County, Mojiang Hani Autonomous County, Zhenyuan Yi, Hani and Lahu Autonomous County, and Yuanjiang Hani, Yi and Dai Autonomous County.

Many Budu born after c. 1970 are unable to speak the language.
