= Southern Loloish languages =

Sino-Tibetan language group

Southern Loloish
- Hanoish
- Geographic distribution: South China and Indochina
- Linguistic classification: Sino-Tibetan: Tibeto-Burman; Lolo–Burmese; Loloish; Southern Loloish

Language codes
- Glottolog: hani1249

The Southern Loloish or Southern Ngwi languages, also known as the Hanoish or Hanish languages, constitute a branch of the Loloish languages that includes Akha and Hani.

== Languages ==
The branches included in Lama (2012), with languages from Bradley (2007), are:

- Hanoish
  - Jinuo
  - - Bisoid
      - Cốông
      - - Sangkong
        - Bisu (Laomian), Phunoi (Singsali, Singsili), Pyen
    - - Hanoid
        - Sila (Sida), Phana’
        - - Akeu (Chepya)
          - Hani (Akha–Hani, Honi)
      - Bi‑Ka
        - Piyo, Enu, Mpi
        - Kaduo

Hanoid in Lama (2012) is alternatively called Akoid in Bradley (2007), who recognizes the Hani-Akha and Haoni-Baihong languages as part of the Akoid group.

Other Southern Loloish languages are:

- Muda
- Paza (Phusang), a recently discovered language of northern Laos related to Sila
- Bana or Bala in Laos. Speakers are included in the Kaw (Akha) ethnic group. The language is now being replaced by other larger languages such as Akha and Lahu.
- Suobi 梭比, spoken in Yinyuan Township 因远镇, Yuanjiang County
- Nuobi 糯比, closely related to Suobi
- Cosao, a Southern Loloish language closely related to Khir
- Yiche 奕车, spoken in Honghe County

Kato (2008) also documents:

- Muteun (mɔ21 tɯ21)
- Khongsat (su55 ma33)
- Khir (la21 ja21)

Other Southern Loloish language varieties in south-central Yunnan include Bukong 布孔, Budu 布都, Asuo 阿梭, Duota 堕塔, Amu 阿木, Lami 腊米, Qiedi 切弟, Kabie 卡别, Woni 窝尼, Duoni 多尼, and Habei 哈备. Habei is unclassified within Southern Loloish.

=== Hsiu (2016, 2018) ===
A 2016 computational phylogenetic lexical analysis by Hsiu (2016) distinguished the following five branches of Southern Loloish, providing further support for the Hanoid (Akoid) and Bisoid branches in Lama (2012) and Bradley (2007). A new Siloid branch was added.

1. Hanoid
2. Bisoid
3. Siloid
4. Bi-Ka (?)
5. Jinuo
- Southern Loloish
  - Hanoid
    - Ko-Pala, Ko-Luma
    - (core branch)
      - Hani languages
        - Hani
        - Haoni (of Shuigui), Baihong, Suobi
      - Akha
        - Muteun
        - (branch)
          - Akha-Nukui, Ko-Phuso
          - Ko-Puli
          - Ko-Chipia
          - Ko-Eupa
          - Ko-Nyau
          - Ko-Oma
  - Bisoid
    - Khongsat
    - Laoseng
    - Sangkong
    - Pyen
    - (core branch)
      - Lao-Pan
      - Bisu
      - Phunoi
      - Phongset
      - Phongku (Phu-Lawa)
      - Phunyot
  - Siloid
    - Wanyä
    - (core branch)
      - Phusang
      - Khir, Cosao
      - Sila (Sida)
  - Bi-Ka
  - Jinuo

The Southern Loloish tree above was subsequently revised by Hsiu (2018) as follows, with 6 subgroups included.

- Southern Loloish
  - Hani-Akha
    - Hanoid: Hani, Nuomei, Nuobi, Lami, Luomian, Angluo, Guohe, Guozuo, Gehuo, Yiche, Qidi, Kabie, Haoni cluster (Haoni, Woni, Baihong, Bukong, Budu, Suobi, Duoni, Duota, Asuo, Amu)
    - Akoid: Nukui, Phuso, Puli, Chepya, Eupa, Nyau, Oma, Chicho, Ulo, Muteun, Muda, etc.
  - Bi-Ka
    - Biyue, Enu
    - Kaduo
  - Siloid
    - Luma, Pala
    - Akeu, Gokhy
    - Wanyä (Muchi)
    - Sila cluster: Sila, Sida, Paza (Phusang), Khir, Cosao, Phana
  - Bisoid
    - Bisu cluster: Bisu, Laomian, Laopin, Pyen, Laopan
    - Singsali cluster: Phunoi, Singsali, Cantan, Laoseng, Phongku, Phongset, Phunyot
    - Coong cluster: Cốông, Sangkong, Tsukong
    - Cauho
    - Bantang
    - Khongsat
    - Habei (Mani)
  - Mpi
  - Jino

Hsiu (2018) considers the Hani-Akha and Bi-Ka subgroups to be part of a northern linkage in south-central Yunnan, while the Siloid, Bisoid, Jino, and Mpi subgroups are part of a southern linkage in the China-Laos border region.

== Innovations ==
Lama (2012) lists the following changes from Proto-Loloish as Hanoish innovations.

- *m- → zero /__[u] (Hani and Haoni)
- *kh- > x- (Hani and Haoni)
- *N- > NC or C (nasal hardening rule in Bisu and Sangkong)
- Reversed order of syllables (family-wide)
