= Yiche language =

Hanoish language

Yiche
- Yicyu
- Pronunciation: [ji tsʰju]
- Native to: China
- Region: Honghe County
- Ethnicity: Hani
- Native speakers: 23,000 (2009)
- Language family: Sino-Tibetan: (Tibeto-Burman); Lolo–Burmese; Loloish; Southern; Hani; Yiche

Language codes
- ISO 639-3: None (mis)
- Glottolog: None

Yiche (Yicyu; Chinese: 奕车) is a Hanoish language spoken by 23,000 people in Honghe County, Yunnan, China (Lan 2009:11).

== Distribution ==
Yiche is spoken in the following locations of Honghe County, Yunnan, China (Lan 2009:11).

- Dayangjie Township 大羊街乡
- Langdu Village 浪堵村, Langdi Township 浪堤乡
- Hadie Village 哈垤村, Chegu Township 车古乡

The Yiche claim that their ancestors had migrated from a village along the shores of Dian Lake near Kunming, and moved south and crossed the Red River (Honghe) after being defeated by other ethnic groups (Lan 2009:3).

== Classification ==
Yiche is a Hani language (fangyan 方言) that belongs to the Langza 浪杂 dialect cluster (tuyu 土语) of Honghe County.

== Vocabulary ==
The following Yiche words are transcribed by Lan (2009) in pinyin. (Note: ss is equivalent to IPA [z].)

English gloss	Chinese gloss	Pinyin	Page
rabbit	兔	tola, li	110
dragon	龙	long	110
snake	蛇	sei	110
horse	马	meng	110
sheep	羊	aci, yo	110
monkey	猴	joniu, niu	110
chicken	鸡	aha, ha	110
dog	狗	aku, ke	110
pig	猪	a'ang, ang	110
ant	蚂蚁	ahu, hu	110
cattle	牛	aniu, niu	110
tiger	虎	haza, la	110
sticky rice	糯米	honio	110
eat	吃	zha	110
one	一	qi	18
household	户	wo	19
person, human	人	co	19
husband	丈夫	niuse ada	19
wife	妻子	niuse ama	19
child	孩子	ssa	22
home	家	yuji, yu	25
small house	小屋	nimssang	37
liquor	酒	aba	57
drink	喝	do	57
