= Gehuo language =

Southern Loloish language of Yunnan, China

Gehuo
- Native to: China
- Region: Yunnan
- Ethnicity: Hani
- Language family: Sino-Tibetan: (Tibeto-Burman); Lolo–Burmese; Loloish; Southern Loloish; Hani; Gehuo

Language codes
- ISO 639-3: None (mis)
- Glottolog: gehu1234

Gehuo (Chinese: 格活) is a Southern Loloish language of Yunnan, China. It is spoken in Baima Shangzhai 白马上寨村, Yingpan Township 营盘乡, Jinping County 金平县, Yunnan (Yang, et al. 2011). Their autonym is Hanni 含妮, whereas the neighboring Hani people refer to them as Gehuo 格活 (Yang, et al. 2011:9). The Gehuo are also found in parts of Lüchun County and Yuanyang County, Yunnan (Yang, et al. 2011:5-6).

== Distribution ==
The Jinping County Ethnic Gazetteer (2013:89, 101) reports that Gehe 格合 (also Gehe 格河; Gehuo 格活; in Laomeng Township 老勐乡 their exonym is Angluo 昂珞 [not the same as the Angluo language which is also known as Gehe]) is spoken in Tongchang 铜厂, Yingpan 营盘, and Laomeng 老勐 townships, and comprised 2,563 households and 10,510 persons as of 2005.
