= Woni language =

Southern Loloish language

Woni
- Native to: China
- Region: Yunnan
- Ethnicity: 85,000 Hani (1997); projected 135,000 in 2010
- Native speakers: (60,000 or more cited 1987)
- Language family: Sino-Tibetan: (Tibeto-Burman); Lolo–Burmese; Loloish; Southern; Hao-Bai; Woni

Language codes
- ISO 639-3: None (mis)
- Glottolog: None

Woni (Chinese: 窝尼; autonym: hɑ31 ɲi33) is a Southern Loloish language spoken in Zhenyuan Yi, Hani and Lahu Autonomous County and Xinping Yi and Dai Autonomous County of Yunnan, China. The most extensive description of Woni to date is that of Yang (2016).

There are 5,406 speakers of Woni in south-central Yunnan, China. Yang (2016) covers the Woni dialect of Leda village (勒达村), Xinping County. Gao (1955) covers the dialect of Yangwu Town (扬武镇), Xinping County.

== Classification ==
Yang (2016, 2021) classifies Woni as a Hao-Bai (Haoni-Baihong) language.

== Distribution ==
Woni speakers are located in the following villages (Yang 2016:1-2).

- Eshan Yi Autonomous County 峨山县
  - Chahe Township 岔河乡: Huilong 回龙村, Qinglongzhai 青龙寨, Halong 哈龙, Buduchong 布度冲, Sanjiaren 三家人, Xinzhai 新寨, Jiuzhai 旧寨, Wumu 乌木村, Xiejia 谢家村, Pengzuba 棚祖坝, Liangjia 梁家村, etc.
  - Huanian Town 化念镇: Luolihe 罗里河, Yangmaochong 羊毛冲, Laoxingzhai 老行寨, Malutang 马鹿塘, Tadamo 他达莫, Fatushan 法图山, etc.
- Xinping Yi and Dai Autonomous County 新平县
  - Yani District 亚尼社区: Leda 勒达小组 and Chahe 岔河小组
  - Yangwu Town 扬武镇: Julali Village 居拉里村 (originally from Malutang 马鹿塘 and Laoxingzhai 老行寨, Eshan County) (language now extinct)
- Jinning County 晋宁县: Xiyang Township 夕阳乡 (in 6 villages)
- Shiping County 石屏县: Longwu Town 龙武镇 (in Yuying Village 育英村)

A similar language variety is spoken in Tonghai County, in (Tonghai County Gazetteer 1992:611-612):

- Tuantian Village 团田村: in Meiziqing 梅子箐, Maweizhai 马尾寨, and Dujiacun 独家村
- Shuitang Village 水塘村: in Xinzhai 新寨

== See also ==
- Woni word list (Wiktionary)
