= Guohe language =

Southern Loloish language of Yunnan, China

Guohe
- Native to: China
- Region: Yunnan
- Ethnicity: Hani
- Language family: Sino-Tibetan: (Tibeto-Burman); Lolo–Burmese; Loloish; Southern Loloish; Hani; Guohe

Language codes
- ISO 639-3: None (mis)
- Glottolog: guoh1234

Guohe (Chinese: 郭合) is a Southern Loloish language of Yunnan, China. It is spoken in Dengqu Village 登去村, Majie Township 马街乡, Yuanjiang County 元阳县, Yunnan (Wang 2011). It is known as Guohong 郭宏 in Yuanyang County, Yunnan (Yuanyang County Gazetteer 1990:625).

The Guohe language is documented in Wang (2011).

== Sources ==
- Wang Linghong 王凌虹. 2011. 国际哈尼/阿卡区域文化调查: 中国元阳县马街哈尼族郭合人文化实录. Kunming: Yunnan People's Press 云南人民出版社. ISBN 978-7-222-07409-5
