= Qidi language =

Language

Qidi
- Qiedi
- Native to: China
- Region: Yunnan
- Ethnicity: Hani
- Language family: Sino-Tibetan: (Tibeto-Burman); Lolo–Burmese; Loloish; Southern; Hani; Qidi

Language codes
- ISO 639-3: None (mis)
- Glottolog: None

Qidi (Chinese: 期弟; also called Qiedi 切弟) is a Southern Loloish language of Yunnan, China. Qidi is spoken in Jiangcheng Hani and Yi Autonomous County, Mojiang Hani Autonomous County, and Lüchun County.

In Mojiang County, Qiedi is spoken by a total of 1,497 people in Baliu Township 坝溜乡 (Yang & Zhang 2010:9).

== Vocabulary ==
Hu & Dai (1964:80) cite the following forms for Qidi (七第). Gloss translations are from Wheatley (1982:13).

- tsa³¹ 'eat' (吃)
- ti³¹ 'hit, beat' (打)
- dɯ̠³³ 'foam, soak' (泡沫)
- de̠³³ 'live, exist' (活)
