= Sangkong language =

Loloish Language

Sangkong
- Buxia
- Native to: China
- Ethnicity: Hani
- Native speakers: (1,500 cited 1995)
- Language family: Sino-Tibetan: Tibeto-Burman; Lolo–Burmese; Loloish; Southern; Bisoid; Sangkong

Language codes
- ISO 639-3: sgk
- Glottolog: sang1320
- ELP: Sangkong
- Sangkong is classified as Vulnerable by the UNESCO Atlas of the World's Languages in Danger

Sangkong (Chinese: 桑孔; autonym: saŋ55 qʰoŋ55) is a Loloish language spoken in China by the Hani people in Xiaojie Township 小街乡, Jinghong County. They are called Buxia (布夏) by the local Dai people (Li 2003).

Li (2003) covers the Sangkong dialect of Manwanwa village 曼宛洼寨, Menglong Town 勐龙镇, Jinghong County. It may be the same as the Muda language. You Weiqiong (2013:172) reports that Buxia 布夏 (Sangkong 桑孔) is spoken in 7 villages of Menglong 勐龙.

Sangkong verb phrases take one of two person markers: ŋa for 1st person, and ʑe for non-1st person.
