= Muteun language =

Loloish language of Laos

Muteun
- Native to: Laos
- Language family: Sino-Tibetan: (Tibeto-Burman); Lolo–Burmese; Loloish; Southern; Hanoid; Akha; Muteun

Language codes
- ISO 639-3: None (mis)
- Glottolog: None

Muteun (mɔ21 tɯ21) is a Loloish language of northern Laos.

Muteun is spoken in Namo District, Oudomxai province, including in Hunapha village (Kato 2008).
