= Guozuo language =

Language in China

Guozuo
- Native to: China
- Region: Yunnan
- Ethnicity: Hani
- Language family: Sino-Tibetan: (Tibeto-Burman); Lolo–Burmese; Loloish; Southern Loloish; Hani; Guozuo

Language codes
- ISO 639-3: None (mis)
- Glottolog: guoz1234

Guozuo (Chinese: 果作) is a Southern Loloish language of Yunnan, China. It is spoken in Jinping Miao, Yao, and Dai Autonomous County and Lüchun County, Yunnan.

The Guozuo language is documented in Shi (2011).

== Distribution ==
In Lüchun County, Guozuo 果作 is spoken in the following township of Pinghe District 平河区 (Lüchun County Gazetteer 1992): Cheli 车里, Xinzhai 新寨, Dongha 东哈, Zedong 则东.

The Jinping County Ethnic Gazetteer (2013:89, 101) reports that Guozuo 国昨 (Guozhuo 郭卓) is spoken in Zhemi 者米, Mengla 勐拉, and Jinshuihe 金水河 townships, comprising 1,953 households and 8,398 persons as of 2005. Shi (2011) documents the Guozuo dialect of Pujiao 普角, Jinshuihe Town 金水河镇, Jinping County 金平县, Yunnan.

Hanizu Shehui Lishi Diaocha 哈尼族社会历史调查 (2009) reports that Gezou 格邹 are found in the following villages of Jinping County (Note: Hani village names are followed by their respective Chinese names.).

- District 3 三区: Lijiazha 里加扎 (Wengdang 翁当寨), Naniupuma 那纽普玛 (Daqi 大其寨), Naniuzha 那纽扎 (Xiaoqi 小其寨)
- District 4 四区: Gouqiezha 苟切扎 (Wuleguo 五了果寨), Silouqiuzha 斯楼丘扎 (Duguo 独果寨), Dapuzha 达普扎 (Ping'an 平安寨), Qiemazha 切玛扎 (Hebian 河边寨), Wupuzha 吴普扎 (Xin'an 新安寨)
