= Muda language =

Loloish language spoken in China

Muda
- Native to: China
- Native speakers: 2,000 (2007)
- Language family: Sino-Tibetan: (Tibeto-Burman); Lolo–Burmese; Loloish; Southern; Akha?; Muda

Language codes
- ISO 639-3: ymd
- Glottolog: muda1235
- ELP: Muda
- Muda is classified as Vulnerable by the UNESCO Atlas of the World's Languages in Danger

Muda (木达 or 母打) is a Loloish language of China.

There are over 2,000 Muda speakers in Nanlianshan Village Community 南联山村委会 (formerly Nanlianshan District, 南联山乡, now part of Gasa Township 嘎洒镇), Jinghong City, Yunnan, China (Xu 1991).

== Classification ==
Xu (1991) classifies Muda as a Ha-Ya language (see Hani languages).

Hsiu (2018) classifies Muda as an Akha language containing a Bisoid substratum, with the substrate language being an early split from Bisoid. Muda has Cl- consonant clusters like various Bisoid languages, Siloid languages, and Jinuo, while words of Bisoid origin include 'leg', 'house', and 'smoke'.

== Phonology ==
Muda has the complex consonant onsets /pl, pʰl, bl, ml, pj, pʰj, bj, mj/ (Xu 1991:34).

== Vocabulary ==
The following vocabulary of Muda is from Xu (1991).

English gloss	Chinese gloss	Muda	Page
White	白	pʰlu⁵⁵	35
Full	满	blaŋ³³	35
Pus	脓	()blaŋ⁵⁵	36
Arrow	箭	()mla³¹	36
Broom	扫帚	()pʰjɔ⁵⁵	36
Bee	蜜蜂	bja³¹	36
Lose, to	遗失	()bjo̱³³	36
Fly, to	飞	jɔ³³	36
Monkey	猴子	()mjo̱³¹	36
Many	多	mja³¹	36
Foot	脚	kʰɯ⁵⁵	37
Six	六	ko̱³¹	37
Gallbladder	胆	()kʰɯ⁵⁵	37
Star	星星	()gɯ⁵⁵	37
Copper	铜	gɯ³¹	37
Tendon	筋	()gu³¹	37
Manure	粪	cçʰe³¹	38
Root (classifier)	根（量词）	cçʰaŋ³¹	38
Wide	宽	()ɟje⁵⁵	38
Drop, to	掉	ɟja³³	38
Day (time)	天（日子）	naŋ³³	38
Soft	软	nø̱³¹	38
Cook, to	煮	tɕa̱³¹	38
Sour	酸	tɕʰɛ⁵⁵	38
Narrow	窄	tɕu̱³¹	38
Lick, to	舔	tɕʰy⁵⁵	38
Stick (classifier)	条	tɕa̱³³	38
Cry, weep	哭	ɴo⁵⁵	39
Steal, to	偷	qʰø³¹	39
Bitter	苦	qʰa³¹	39
Smoke (fog)	烟（雾）	()qʰø³¹	39
Nine	九	ɢø³¹	39
Curved	弯	ɢaŋ³¹	39
Play, to	玩耍	()ɢa³³	39
Enter, to	进	aŋ⁵⁵	40
Horse	马	maŋ³¹	40
Open (door)	开（门）	pʰaŋ³³	40
Sell, to	卖	aŋ³¹	40
Throat	喉咙	kʰaŋ³¹()	40
Dark	暗	jaŋ⁵⁵	40
Pus	脓	()blaŋ⁵⁵	40
Full	满	blaŋ³³	40
Money	钱	()kʰaŋ⁵⁵	40
Bear	狗熊	()xum⁵⁵	40
Otter	水獭	()ɕum⁵⁵	40
Iron	铁	ɕʰum⁵⁵	41
Pile (of soil)	堆（土）	blum⁵⁵	41
House	房屋	ʑum⁵⁵	41
Roast, to	烤	lum⁵⁵	41
Round	圆	laŋ³³	41
Surround, to	包围	()laŋ⁵⁵	41
Pond	池塘	laŋ³³()	41
Axe	斧子	()dzɿ³³	41
Woman	女人	()mi³¹	41
Louse	虱子	ɕɛ⁵⁵()	41
Goose	鹅	gɛ̱³³()	41
Push, to	推	dɛ³¹	41
Edge	边上	()dzɛ⁵⁵()	41
Eagle	老鹰	()dzɛ⁵⁵	41
Saddle	鞍子	()qɔ̱³³	41
Shallow	浅	tɛ̱³³	41
Change, to	改	pʰa³³	41
Winnow (rice), to	簸（米）	ja⁵⁵	41
See, to	看见	()mɔ⁵⁵	41
Mosquito	蚊子	()gɔ³¹	41
Change, to	变	pʰa⁵⁵	41
Stick (classifier)	条	tɕa̱³³	41
Leg	腿	bɔ⁵⁵()	41
Store, to	铺	qʰɔ³¹	41
