= Luomian language =

Southern Loloish language of Yunnan, China

Luomian
- Native to: China
- Region: Yunnan
- Ethnicity: Hani
- Language family: Sino-Tibetan: (Tibeto-Burman); Lolo–Burmese; Loloish; Southern Loloish; Hani; Luomian

Language codes
- ISO 639-3: None (mis)
- Glottolog: luom1234

Luomian (Chinese: 罗缅) is a Southern Loloish language of Yunnan, China. It is spoken in Xinyayong 新亚拥, Shangxincheng Township 上新城乡, Yuanyang County, Yunnan (Sun, et al. 2011).

== Sources ==
- Sun Dongbo 孙东波; Li Guimei 李贵梅; Wang Qian 王谦; Yang Fengying 杨凤英. 2011. 国际哈尼/阿卡区域文化调查: 中国元阳县上新城哈尼族罗缅人文化实录. Kunming: Yunnan People's Press 云南人民出版社. ISBN 978-7-222-08433-9
