= Zhengdong =

Zhengdong may refer to:

- Zhengdong New Area, Zhengzhou, Henan, China
- Zhengdong, Yunnan, in Jiangcheng Hani and Yi Autonomous County, Yunnan, China
- Zhengdong Province (1270–1356) in Korea when Goryeo was under the Mongol Yuan empire in China

== See also ==
- Jana Ueekata (1549–1611) or Tei Dō (Chinese: Zheng Dong), Ryukyuan aristocrat and bureaucrat
