= Asuo language =

Loloish language spoken in Yunnan, China

Asuo
- Asong
- Native to: China
- Region: Yunnan
- Ethnicity: Hani
- Language family: Sino-Tibetan: (Tibeto-Burman); Lolo–Burmese; Loloish; Hanoish; Hani; Hao-Bai; Asuo

Language codes
- ISO 639-3: None (mis)
- Glottolog: ason1245

Asuo (Chinese: 阿梭; also called Asong 阿松) is a Southern Loloish language of Yunnan, China. Asuo is spoken in Jiangcheng Hani and Yi Autonomous County, Yuanjiang Hani, Yi and Dai Autonomous County, Lüchun County, Jinping Miao, Yao, and Dai Autonomous County, and Yuanyang County, Yunnan.

Lefèvre-Pontalis (1892) reports the presence of Asong in Poufang, Lai Chau province, Vietnam, and provides a word list for Asong as well.

 Some Asuo (Azong) are classified as Yi people.
