= Zhenyuan Yi, Hani and Lahu Autonomous County =

Zhenyuan County 镇沅县 · Ceiqyiq xeif
- Autonomous county
- 镇沅彝族哈尼族拉祜族自治县; Ceiqyiq Haqhholssaq Haqniqssaq Lalhuqcuq Ziiqziifxeif; Zhenyuan Yi, Hani and Lahu Autonomous County
- Location of Zhenyuan County (red) and Pu'er City (pink) within Yunnan

- Location of the seat in Yunnan
- Coordinates: 24°00′14″N 101°06′32″E
- Country: China
- Province: Yunnan
- Prefecture-level city: Pu'er
- GB/T 2260 CODE: 530825
- County seat: Enle

Area
  - Total: 4,223 km^{2} (1,631 sq mi)
- Elevation: 1,741 m (5,712 ft)

Population (2020 census)
  - Total: 179,503
  - Density: 42.51/km^{2} (110.1/sq mi)
- Time zone: UTC+8 (China Standard Time)
- Postal code: 666500
- Area code: 0879
- Website: www.pezhenyuan.gov.cn
- ^{1}Yunnan Statistics Bureau^{2}Puer Gov.^{3}Yunnan Portal

Zhenyuan Yi, Hani and Lahu Autonomous County (simplified Chinese: 镇沅彝族哈尼族拉祜族自治县; traditional Chinese: 鎮沅彝族哈尼族拉祜族自治縣; pinyin: Zhènyuán Yízú Hānízú Lāhùzú Zìzhìxiàn; Hani: Ceiqyiq Haqhholssaq Haqniqssaq Lalhuqcuq Ziiqziifxeif) is an autonomous county under the jurisdiction of Pu'er City, in southern Yunnan Province, China. It borders Xinping County to the east, Mojiang County and Ning'er County to the southeast, Jinggu County to the south, Linxiang District across the Lancang River to the west, and Jingdong County and Shuangbai County to the north.

== Administrative divisions ==
In the present, Zhenyuan Yi, Hani and Lahu Autonomous County has 8 towns and 1 township.

8 towns

- Enle (恩乐镇)
- Anban (按板镇)
- Mengda (勐大镇)
- Zhedong (者东镇)
- Jiujia (九甲镇)
- Gucheng (古城镇)
- Zhentai (振太镇)
- Heping (和平镇)

1 township

- Tianba (田坝乡)

== Ethnic groups ==
The Zhenyuan County Gazetteer (1995:74-79) lists the following ethnic groups and locations. All population statistics, given in parentheses, are as of 1988.

- Yi
  - Luoluo 倮倮 (30,065 people)
  - Lawu 拉乌 (6,455 people): Zhedong 者东乡 Maidi 麦地, Madeng 马邓; Jiading 九甲乡 Santai 三台, Guoji 果吉, Jiujia 九甲
  - Xiangtang 香堂 (12,312)
  - Mili 米利 (1,127 people): Liwei 里崴乡 Xinjie 新街村 Laomahe 老马河社, Pingdi 平地村 Hetaohe 核桃河社, Wenduo 文夺村 Longshucao 龙树槽社; Mengda 勐大乡 Wenlai 文来村, small parts of Zhentai 振太乡 Taitou 台头村
  - Menghua 蒙化 (345 people): Zhentai 振太, Liwei 里崴, Mengda 勐大, part of Enle 恩乐镇
  - Ache 阿车 (117 people): Heping 和平乡 Yakou 丫口村, Zhedong 者东乡 Zhangpen 樟盆村
  - Shansu 山苏 (150 people): Zhedong 者东乡 Zhangpen 樟盆村, Heping 和平乡 Yakou 丫口村
  - Guaigun 拐棍 (309 people): Tianba 田坝乡 Tianba 田坝, Santai/Sanhe 三台/三合, Lianhe 联合, Minqiang 民强
  - Luowu 罗武 (50 people): Heping 和平乡 Yakou 丫口村
- Hani
  - Kaduo 卡多
  - Biyue 碧约
  - Budu 布都
  - Bukong 布孔
  - Baikuo 白阔 (also Biyue 碧约): Gucheng Village 古城村 Meiziqing 梅子箐, Naka 那卡; also some near county seat
  - Woni 窝尼: Sanzhangtian Township 三章田乡 Xinguang 新光, Banghai 帮海
- Lahu (autonym: Guocuo 锅挫; exonyms: Kucong 苦聪, Guzong 古宗, Kagui 卡桂)

== Climate ==
Climate data for Zhenyuan, elevation 1,105 m (3,625 ft), (1991–2020 normals, extremes 1981–present)
Month	Jan	Feb	Mar	Apr	May	Jun	Jul	Aug	Sep	Oct	Nov	Dec	Year
Record high °C (°F)	28.9 (84.0)	31.5 (88.7)	35.4 (95.7)	37.0 (98.6)	38.2 (100.8)	35.7 (96.3)	35.3 (95.5)	35.5 (95.9)	35.2 (95.4)	34.1 (93.4)	31.2 (88.2)	27.0 (80.6)	38.2 (100.8)
Mean daily maximum °C (°F)	22.6 (72.7)	25.6 (78.1)	28.3 (82.9)	30.5 (86.9)	30.9 (87.6)	30.6 (87.1)	29.6 (85.3)	30.0 (86.0)	29.0 (84.2)	26.8 (80.2)	24.7 (76.5)	22.1 (71.8)	27.6 (81.6)
Daily mean °C (°F)	12.8 (55.0)	15.0 (59.0)	18.1 (64.6)	21.0 (69.8)	23.3 (73.9)	24.5 (76.1)	24.0 (75.2)	23.8 (74.8)	22.7 (72.9)	20.5 (68.9)	16.6 (61.9)	13.6 (56.5)	19.7 (67.4)
Mean daily minimum °C (°F)	7.5 (45.5)	7.8 (46.0)	10.7 (51.3)	14.1 (57.4)	17.9 (64.2)	20.9 (69.6)	21.0 (69.8)	20.7 (69.3)	19.8 (67.6)	17.4 (63.3)	12.7 (54.9)	9.6 (49.3)	15.0 (59.0)
Record low °C (°F)	2.9 (37.2)	2.6 (36.7)	5.5 (41.9)	9.2 (48.6)	11.1 (52.0)	16.1 (61.0)	18.5 (65.3)	15.7 (60.3)	12.4 (54.3)	10.5 (50.9)	6.6 (43.9)	4.1 (39.4)	2.6 (36.7)
Average precipitation mm (inches)	31.6 (1.24)	12.6 (0.50)	22.7 (0.89)	44.6 (1.76)	102.4 (4.03)	162.3 (6.39)	269.6 (10.61)	249.0 (9.80)	135.9 (5.35)	137.2 (5.40)	40.2 (1.58)	15.7 (0.62)	1,223.8 (48.17)
Average precipitation days (≥ 0.1 mm)	4.6	3.0	5.4	8.5	11.5	18.8	23.5	21.4	17.3	15.1	6.1	4.2	139.4
Average relative humidity (%)	78	69	63	64	69	78	84	84	84	84	83	82	77
Mean monthly sunshine hours	183.2	207.9	225.1	219.7	195.1	131.4	120.0	141.3	124.7	129.9	156.0	155.6	1,989.9
Percentage possible sunshine	55	65	60	57	47	32	29	36	34	37	48	47	46
Source: China Meteorological Administration All-time October highall-time November high
