= Mpi people =

Mpi
Total population
- 1,287

Regions with significant populations
- Thailand

Languages
- Mpi, Thai

Religion
- Theravada Buddhism, animism

The Mpi people, officially called Kaw (Umpi) (Thai: ก่อ (อึมปี้)) are an ethnic group of Thailand. Their population is limited to the villages of Ban Dong in Phrae province and Sakoen in Nan and numbered at 1,287 according to surveys in 2017.

The groups were first documented by anthropologist Richard Davis in 1967. According to oral histories, they migrated from Sipsongpanna in southern China around the 18th century. They speak a distinctive language, Mpi—a Sino-Tibetan language—and practise animist religious beliefs alongside Buddhism.
