= Jino people =

Tibeto-Burman ethnic group

Jino
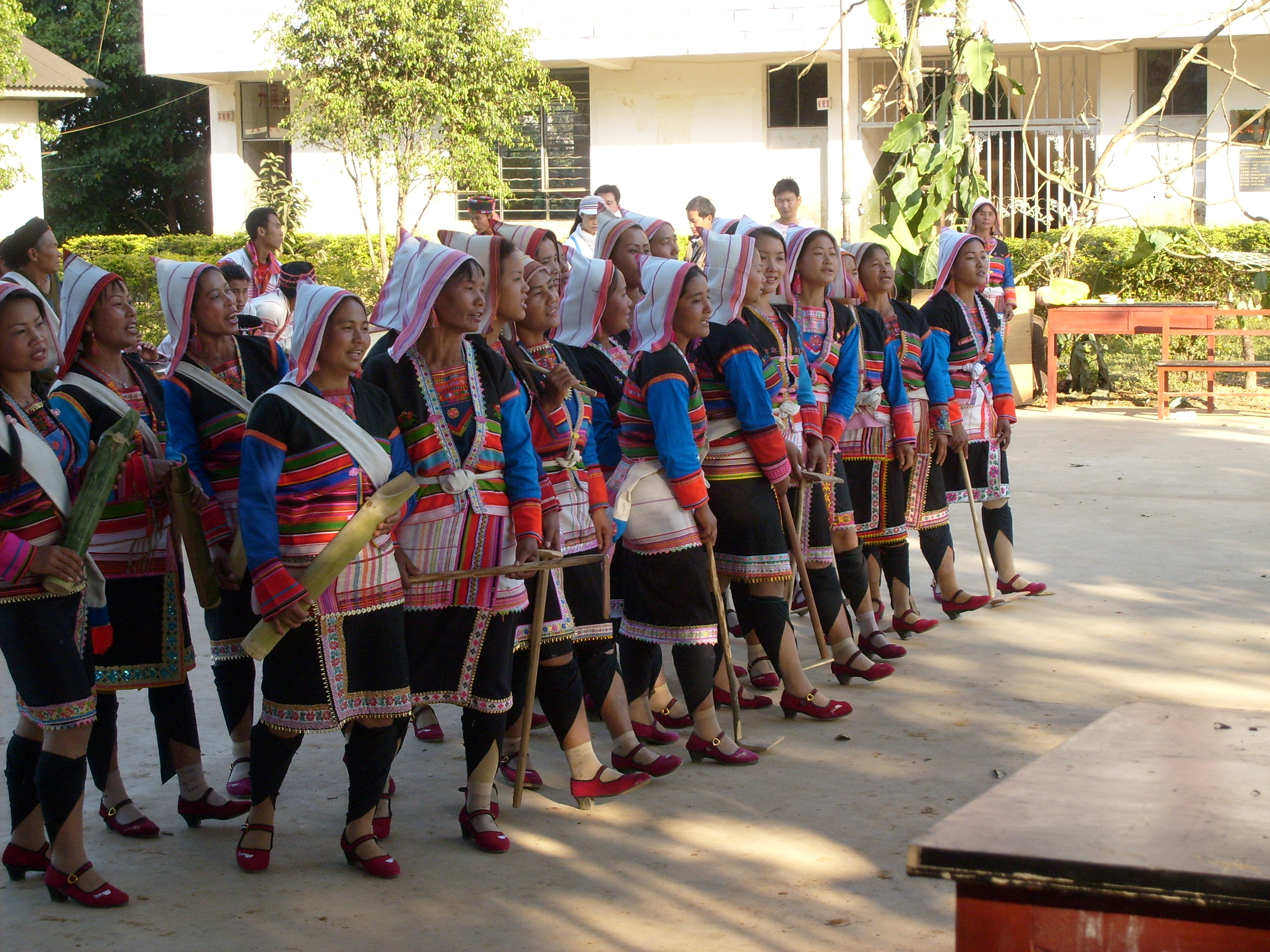

Total population
- 26,025

Regions with significant populations
- China, Yunnan

Languages
- Jino

Religion
- Animism, Buddhism

Related ethnic groups
- Yi, Qiang

The Jino (also spelled Jinuo) people (simplified Chinese: 基诺族; traditional Chinese: 基諾族; pinyin: Jīnuòzú, endonym: [tɕy˦no˦] or [ki˦ɲo˦]) are a Tibeto-Burman ethnic group. They form one of the 56 ethnic groups officially recognized by the People's Republic of China. They live in an area called the Jino Mountains (Jinuoshan 基诺山) in eastern Jinghong, Xishuangbanna, Yunnan province.

The Jino are one of the less numerous of the recognized minorities in China and the last one included as "national minority" because they were only recognized in 1979. A former name used for the Jino, Youle, means "following the maternal uncle," an indication of a matrilineal past.

The Jino have a population of 26,025 people according to the census of the year 2020. Most of the Jino concentrate in Jinoshan, in a series of mild hills with wet climate near Mengyang Township in Jinghong Municipality, Xishuangbanna Dai Autonomous Prefecture of Yunnan Province. They live in an area of about 70x50 km. They live in subtropical rainforest, home of elephants, wild oxen and monkeys.

Among their cultural practices is tooth painting, in which soot made from pear trees is used.

== Population distribution ==
This table shows the population distribution of the Jino nationality on the county level, according to the figures of the last census of 2000. (Showing only values above 0.10%.)

city, county, district	superior district	superior province	number of Jino	% of total Jino population in China
Jinghong city (景洪市)	Xishuangbanna autonomous prefecture of the Dai	Yunnan province	19,250	92.11%
Mengla county (勐腊县; Traditional: 勐臘縣)	Xishuangbanna autonomous prefecture of the Dai	Yunnan province	897	4.29%
Guandu district (官渡区; Traditional: 官渡區)	Kunming city	Yunnan province	119	0.57%
Cuiyun district (翠云区; Traditional: 翠雲區)	Simao city	Yunnan province	82	0.39%
Menghai county (勐海县; Traditional: 勐海縣)	Xishuangbanna autonomous prefecture of the Dai	Yunnan province	52	0.25%
Wuhua district (五华区; Traditional: 五華區)	Kunming city	Yunnan province	47	0.23%
Xishan district (西山区; Traditional: 西山區)	Kunming city	Yunnan province	47	0.23%
Pu'er autonomous county of the Hani and Yi (普洱哈尼族彝族自治县; Traditional: 普洱哈尼族彝族自治縣)	Simao city	Yunnan province	26	0.12%
Zhenkang county (镇康县; Traditional: 鎮康縣)	Lincang city	Yunnan province	23	0.11%
other areas in China			356	1.7%
