= Xinping Yi and Dai Autonomous County =

Xinping 新平县
- Autonomous county
- 新平彝族傣族自治县; Xinping Yi and Dai Autonomous County
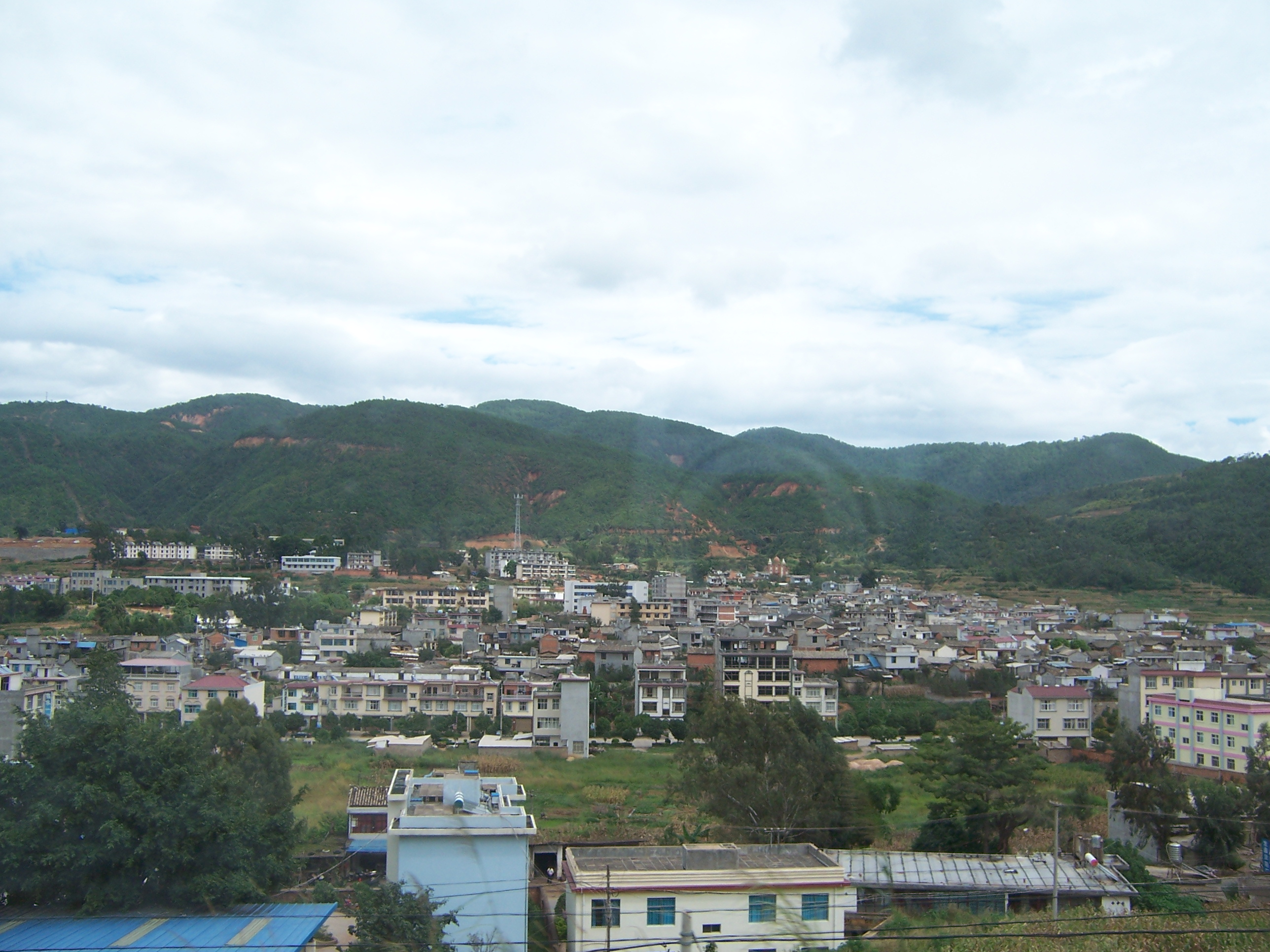
- Yangwu Town

- Location of Xinping County (red) and Yuxi City (pink) within Yunnan

- Location within China Xinping (China)
- Coordinates: 24°4′8″N 101°59′20″E
- Country: China
- Province: Yunnan
- Prefecture-level city: Yuxi
- County seat: Guishan

Area
  - Total: 1,114 km^{2} (430 sq mi)

Population (2020 census)
  - Total: 262,771
  - Density: 235.9/km^{2} (610.9/sq mi)
- Time zone: UTC+8 (CST)
- Postal code: 653400
- Area code: 0877
- Website: www.xinping.gov.cn

Xinping Yi and Dai Autonomous County (Chinese: 新平彝族傣族自治县; pinyin: Xīnpíng Yízú Dǎizú Zìzhìxiàn) is an autonomous county located in the central part of Yunnan Province, China. It is the westernmost county-level division of the prefecture-level city of Yuxi. It borders Eshan County and Shiping County to the east, Yuanjiang County and Mojiang County to the south, Zhenyuan County to the west, and Shuangbai County to the north.

== Administrative divisions ==
Xinping Yi and Dai Autonomous County has 2 subdistricts, 4 towns and 6 townships.

2 subdistricts

- Guishan (桂山街道)
- Gucheng (古城街道)

4 towns

- Yangwu (扬武镇)
- Mosha (漠沙镇)
- Jiasa (戛洒镇)
- Shuitang (水塘镇)

6 townships

- Pingdian (平甸乡)
- Xinhua (新化乡)
- Jianxing (建兴乡)
- Laochang (老厂乡)
- Zhelong (者竜乡)
- Pingzhang (平掌乡)

== Ethnic groups ==
The Xinping County Gazetteer (1993:106, 118) lists the following Yi and Hani subgroups.

- Yi: 111,555 (1987); subgroups are Niesu 聂苏, Nasu 纳苏, Chesu 车苏, Lalu 腊鲁, Lawu 拉乌, Mili 咪利, Micha 密查, Xiangtang 香堂, Luowu 罗武, Menghua 蒙化
  - Niesu 聂苏: Lukuishan 鲁魁山 and Mopanshan 磨盘山 of Yangwu Township 扬武镇
  - Nasu 纳苏: Xinhua 新化乡, Laochang 老厂乡, Feijia 费贾 of Pingdian 平甸乡, Taokong 桃孔, Baihe 白鹤, Zhedian 者甸
  - Chesu 车苏: Laochang 老厂乡
- Hani: 9,547 (1987)
  - Kaduo 卡多: Wajiao 挖窖 of Jianxing 建兴乡; Wasi 瓦寺 and Baizhi 柏枝 of Pingzhang 平掌乡; Shengli 胜利 of Mosha 漠沙乡
  - Nuobi 糯比 and Suobi 梭比: Meiziqing 梅子箐 of Jianxing 建兴乡; Dazhai 大寨 of Fuxing 复兴
  - Woni 窝尼: Yani 亚尼 of Pingdian 平甸
  - Duota 堕塔: Xinzhai 新寨村 of Panlong 盘龙
  - Biyue 碧约: Mowei 磨味 of Jianxing 建兴乡

There are various Tai ethnic groups in Xinping County. They numbered 40,890 (15.54%) of the total population of Xinping County as of 2000, and include the following subgroups.

- Tai Kha 傣卡 (Chinese Dai 汉傣): in Mosha Town 漠沙镇 and Yaojie Town 腰街镇
- Tai Sa 傣沙 (Tai Xa): in Mosha Township 漠沙镇
- Tai Ya 傣雅 (Tai Yalun 傣雅伦): in Gasa Town 嘎洒镇 and Shuitang Township 水塘镇

These three groups are known as the 花腰傣, or 'Flowery-waisted Tai' due to the style of their women's clothing. Local Tai languages include the Yuánxīn 元新 dialect of Tai Hongjin.

The Damuyu Flowery-Waist Dai Cultural and Ecological Tourist Village (大沐浴花腰傣文化生态旅游村) is located in Longhe Village 龙河村, Mosha Township 漠沙镇.

== Climate ==
Climate data for Xinping, elevation 1,498 m (4,915 ft), (1991–2020 normals, extremes 1981–present)
Month	Jan	Feb	Mar	Apr	May	Jun	Jul	Aug	Sep	Oct	Nov	Dec	Year
Record high °C (°F)	24.8 (76.6)	28.7 (83.7)	30.9 (87.6)	33.0 (91.4)	33.5 (92.3)	31.6 (88.9)	31.4 (88.5)	31.2 (88.2)	30.5 (86.9)	29.2 (84.6)	28.2 (82.8)	25.3 (77.5)	33.5 (92.3)
Mean daily maximum °C (°F)	18.3 (64.9)	21.1 (70.0)	24.8 (76.6)	27.3 (81.1)	27.5 (81.5)	27.4 (81.3)	26.7 (80.1)	26.8 (80.2)	25.9 (78.6)	23.6 (74.5)	20.8 (69.4)	18.0 (64.4)	24.0 (75.2)
Daily mean °C (°F)	10.9 (51.6)	13.2 (55.8)	16.9 (62.4)	19.9 (67.8)	21.7 (71.1)	22.6 (72.7)	21.9 (71.4)	21.4 (70.5)	20.3 (68.5)	18.0 (64.4)	14.1 (57.4)	11.1 (52.0)	17.7 (63.8)
Mean daily minimum °C (°F)	5.9 (42.6)	7.4 (45.3)	10.6 (51.1)	13.8 (56.8)	16.9 (62.4)	19.2 (66.6)	19.0 (66.2)	18.3 (64.9)	17.1 (62.8)	14.7 (58.5)	10.0 (50.0)	6.8 (44.2)	13.3 (56.0)
Record low °C (°F)	−0.6 (30.9)	1.0 (33.8)	−0.8 (30.6)	5.9 (42.6)	9.0 (48.2)	13.5 (56.3)	14.0 (57.2)	13.1 (55.6)	9.1 (48.4)	7.2 (45.0)	0.9 (33.6)	−2.7 (27.1)	−2.7 (27.1)
Average precipitation mm (inches)	29.1 (1.15)	15.4 (0.61)	23.1 (0.91)	43.5 (1.71)	92.6 (3.65)	119.0 (4.69)	173.2 (6.82)	183.0 (7.20)	99.8 (3.93)	86.5 (3.41)	38.4 (1.51)	17.3 (0.68)	920.9 (36.27)
Average precipitation days (≥ 0.1 mm)	4.3	3.6	5.0	8.6	11.8	13.9	19.6	19.6	14.2	12.4	6.1	4.2	123.3
Average snowy days	0.1	0.1	0.1	0	0	0	0	0	0	0	0	0	0.3
Average relative humidity (%)	73	63	56	57	66	76	83	84	82	82	80	78	73
Mean monthly sunshine hours	228.7	232.0	259.5	259.7	236.4	176.5	136.8	150.7	145.0	155.0	202.2	203.3	2,385.8
Percentage possible sunshine	68	72	69	68	57	43	33	38	40	44	62	62	55
Source: China Meteorological Administrationall-time November high
