= Hani languages =

Language group

Hanoid
- Hani
- Geographic distribution: Southern China and Indochina
- Linguistic classification: Sino-Tibetan: (Tibeto-Burman); Lolo–Burmese; Loloish; Southern Loloish; Hanoid

Language codes
- Glottolog: hani1250 (Hanic)

The Hani languages are a group of closely related but distinct languages of the Loloish (Yi) branch of the Tibeto-Burman linguistic group. They are also referred to as the Hanoid languages by Lama (2012) and as the Akoid languages by Bradley (2007).

Approximately 1.5 million people speak these languages, mainly in China, Laos, Burma (Myanmar), and Vietnam; more than 90% of the speakers of these languages live in China. Various ethnicities that use Hani languages are grouped into a single class recognized nationality named Hani after the largest subgroup. In China, the languages of this group—which include Hani proper, Akha, and Hao-Bai (Honi and Baihong)—are considered dialects (Chinese: fangyan 方言). Western scholars, however, have traditionally classified them as separate languages.

== Varieties ==
In China, Akha and other related languages are considered to be derivatives of Hani. They are not mutually intelligible, which means that speakers of one language do not necessarily understand speakers of the other language. In 2007, according to Ethnologue, there were almost 1.5 million speakers of all Hani varieties. Slightly more than half (760,000) of these speakers can speak Hani properly (considering age etc.). Lama (2012) groups the principal varieties of the Hani languages identified by Bradley (2007) as follows: Yunnan locations and speaker populations are from Haniyu Jianzhi 哈尼语简志 according to information from 1986.

- Ha-Ya 哈雅 had 850,000 speakers in 1982. The representative dialect is Dazhai 大寨 and is spoken in Lüchun County.
  - Hani 哈尼 (autonym: xa21 ni21; orthography: "Haqniqdoq") has 520,000 speakers in south-central Yunnan, China and 12,500 speakers in Vietnam. In Yunnan is spoken in Honghe, Yuanyang, Lüchun, and Jinping counties.
  - Akha 阿卡 a.k.a. Yani 雅尼 (ritual autonym: za21 ni21; orthography: "Aqkaqdoq") has 550,000 speakers: 250,000 in China, 220,000 in Burma, 35,000 in northern Thailand, and 35,000 in northern Laos. In Yunnan, China it is spoken in Sipsongpanna. Representative dialect is Gelanghe Township 格朗和哈尼族乡, Menghai County.
  - Muda 木达 has over 2,000 speakers in Nanlianshan township 南联山乡, Jinghong City, Yunnan, China (Xu 1991).
- Hao-Bai 豪白: 210,000 speakers in Mojiang, Yuanjiang, and Pu'er counties. Representative dialect: Shuigui 水癸, Mojiang County.
  - Haoni 豪尼 a.k.a. Honi (autonym: xɒ21 ni21) has 120,000 speakers.
  - Baihong 白宏 (autonym: pɤ31 xɔ̃31) has 60,000 speakers.

David Bradley (2007) considers the Hani-Akha (Ha-Ya) and Haoni-Baihong (Hao-Bai) languages to be part of an Akoid subgroup.

In China, all of the Bi-Ka languages (Chinese: 碧卡) are considered to form a single Hani dialect cluster (Chinese: 方言 fangyan), and the speakers are officially classified as ethnic Hani (Haniyu Jianzhi 哈尼语简志 1986). Recognized dialects include Biyue 碧约 (autonym: bi31jɔ31), Kaduo 卡多, and Enu 峨努. In Yunnan, China, they are spoken in Mojiang, Jiangcheng, Jingdong, and other counties, with a total of 370,000 speakers. The representative dialect is that of Caiyuan 菜园, Mojiang County.

Other Hani varieties include Luomian 罗缅, Guozuo 果作, Gehuo 格活, and Guohe 郭合 (Tang 2011).

=== Yunnan Provincial Gazetteer ===
The Yunnan Provincial Gazetteer (云南省志：少数民族语言文字志, p. 113) classifies the Hani languages as follows. Additional dialects and datapoints from Zhang (1998) and Tang (2011) are also included.

- Ha-Ya 哈雅方言, 680,000 people
  - Hani 哈尼次方言
    - Dazhai, Lüchun County dialect 绿春大寨哈尼土语 (Dazhai is the standard Hani 哈尼 dialect; also includes the datapoint of Dashuigou 大水沟)
    - Angluo 昂倮 ("Hhaqloldoq"): Malizhai, Yuanyang County dialect 元阳麻栗寨哈尼土语 (also includes the datapoint of Guozong 果统)
    - Luobi 罗碧 ("Lolbiqdoq"): Dazhai, Jinping County 金平大寨; Adebo, Jinping County 金平阿得博
    - Malutang, Jinping County dialect 金平马鹿塘哈尼土语 (also known as Loumei 楼梅)
    - Lami 腊咪 ("Laqmildoq"): Jiayin, Honghe County dialect 红河甲寅哈尼土语 (also includes the datapoint of Leyu 乐育)
    - Langza, Honghe County dialect 红河浪杂哈尼土语 (includes Yiche)
    - Luomian 罗缅: Xinyayong 新亚拥, Shangxincheng Township 上新城乡, Yuanyang County
    - Guozuo 果作: Pujiao 普角, Jinshuihe Town 金水河镇, Jinping County
    - Gehuo 格活: Baima Shangzhai 白马上寨村, Yingpan Township 营盘乡, Jinping County 金平县
    - Guohe 郭合: Dengqu Village 登去村, Majie Township 马街乡, Yuanjiang County 元阳县
  - Yani 雅尼次方言
    - Gelanghe, Xishuangbanna dialect 西双版纳格朗和雅尼土语
    - Naduo, Lancang County dialect 澜沧那多雅尼土语
- Haoni (Hao-Bai) 豪白方言, 180,000 people
  - Haoni 豪尼: Shuigui, Mojiang County dialect 墨江水癸土语
  - Baihong 白宏: Bali, Mojiang County dialect 墨江坝利土语
  - Asuo 阿梭
  - Duota 多塔
  - Budu 布都
- Bi-Ka 碧卡方言, 300,000 people
  - Biyue 碧约: Caiyuan Township, Mojiang County dialect 墨江菜园乡土语
  - Kaduo 卡多: Minxing Township, Mojiang County dialect 墨江民兴乡土语
  - Enu 哦怒: Dazhai, Yayi Township, Mojiang County dialect 墨江雅邑大寨土语

== Distribution ==
=== China ===
In China, Hani languages are spoken mostly in areas east of the Mekong River in the south-central Yunnan province, concentrated in the Pu'er and Honghe prefectures as well as in parts of other surrounding prefectures. Hani is also spoken in Lai Châu Province of northwestern Vietnam, northern Laos, and Shan State of northeastern Burma.

=== Vietnam ===
Edmondson (2002) reports that the Hani of Vietnam is distributed in 2 provinces of northwestern Vietnam. The earliest Hani pioneers to Vietnam probably numbered around 5 to 6 families, and arrived in Mường Tè District from Jinping County and Lüchun County in Yunnan about 325 years ago. The Hani of Phong Thổ District and Bát Xát District arrived later, about 175 years ago from Yunnan. The Hani of Vietnam claim to be able to communicate in the Hani language with ethnic Hani from different areas of Vietnam despite significant geographical barriers. Edmondson (2002), however, reported different Hani speech varieties in various parts of northwestern Vietnam, which differ mostly lexically.

- Mường Tè District, Lai Châu Province
  - Sín Thấu
  - Chung Chải
  - Mù Cả (Bản Mù Cả, etc.; Hà Nhì Cồ Chồ clan)
  - Ca Lăng
  - Thu Lũm
  - Xạ Hua Bun (Bản Chang Chau Pa, etc.; Hà Nhì La Mí clan)
- Phong Thổ District, Lai Châu Province (Hà Nhì Đen or Black Hani people)
- Bát Xát District, Lai Châu Province (Hà Nhì Đen or Black Hani people)
  - Y Tí
  - A Lù
