= Mpi language =

Loloish language of Thailand

Mpi
- Kaw
- Native to: Thailand, perhaps China
- Ethnicity: 1,500 (2007)
- Native speakers: 900 (2007)
- Language family: Sino-Tibetan: Tibeto-Burman; Lolo–Burmese; Loloish; Southern Loloish; Bi-Ka; Mpi

Language codes
- ISO 639-3: mpz
- Glottolog: mpii1239
- ELP: Mpi
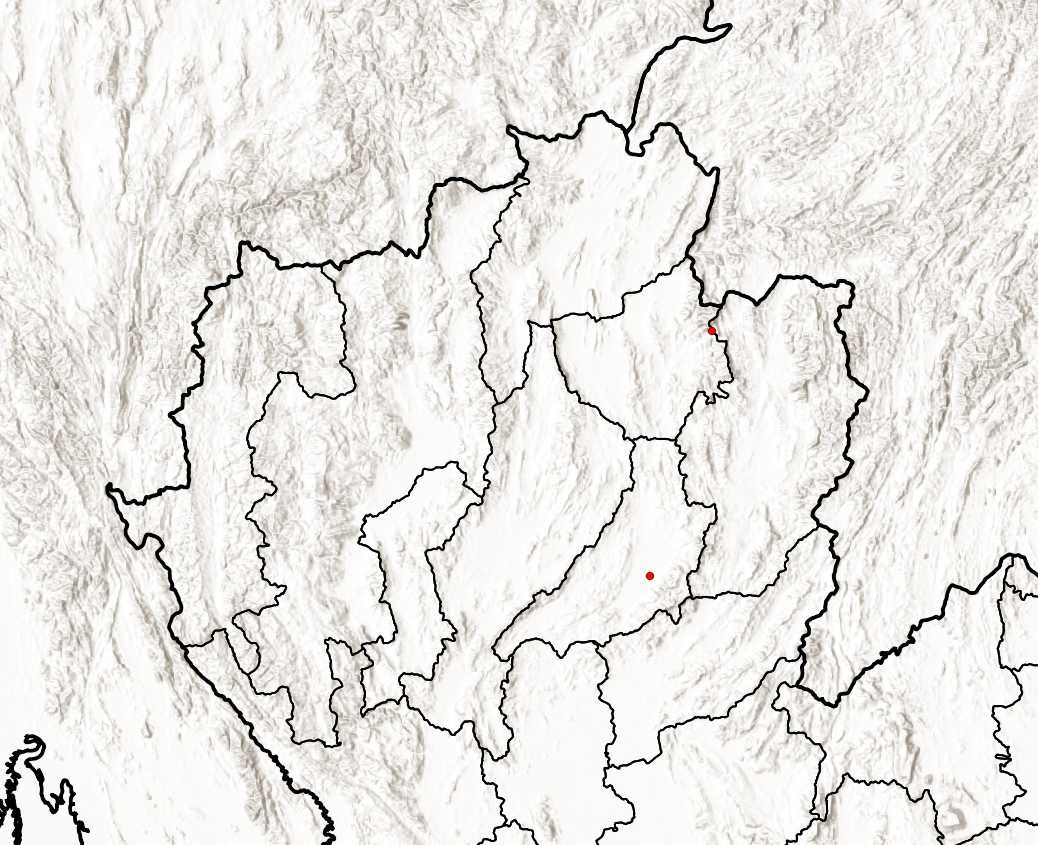

- Mpi is classified as Severely Endangered by the UNESCO Atlas of the World's Languages in Danger.

Mpi is a Loloish language of Thailand. The number of speakers is in decline. It is spoken in the following two villages in northern Thailand.

- Ban Dong (บ้านดง), Tambon Suan Khuean (สวนเขื่อน), Mueang Phrae District, Phrae Province (autonym: m̩˧pi˥˧ in Ban Dong)
- Ban Sakoen (บ้านสะเกิน), Tambon Yot (ยอด), Song Khwae District, Nan Province (autonym: kɔ˥˧ in Ban Sakoeng)

Since the Mpi of Thailand migrated from Mengla, Xishuangbanna, Yunnan, China over 300 years ago, there could also possibly be Mpi speakers in China (Nahhas 2007).

== Phonology ==
Mpi has six tones and two phonations in its vowels, modal voice and stiff voice:

Tone	Modal voice	Stiff voice
Low	sì 'blood'	sì̬ 'seven'
Low rising	si᷅ 'putrid'	si̬᷅ 'dried up'
Mid	sī (a color)	sī̬ (a classifier)
Mid rising	sǐ 'to roll'	sǐ̬ 'to smoke'
High	sí 'four'	sí̬ (a name)
High rising	si᷄ 'to die'	si̬᷄ (a name)
