= Daxing, Lüchun County =

Daxing 大兴镇
- Town
- Location in Yunnan
- Coordinates: 22°59′46″N 102°25′35″E
- Country: People's Republic of China
- Province: Yunnan
- Autonomous prefecture: Honghe Hani and Yi Autonomous Prefecture
- County: Lüchun County
- Time zone: UTC+8 (China Standard)

Daxing (simplified Chinese: 大兴; traditional Chinese: 大興; pinyin: Dàxīng) is a town under the administration of Lüchun County, Yunnan, China. As of 2018, it has seven residential communities and seven villages under its administration.
