= Jino language =

Loloish languages spoken in China

Jino
- Jinuo, Buyuan Jino, Youle Jino, 基諾語補遠方言
- Jinuo
- Pronunciation: [tɕy˦no˦] or [ki˦ɲo˦]
- Region: Sipsongpanna, Dai autonomous prefecture of southern Yunnan (People's Republic of China)
- Ethnicity: Jino
- Native speakers: 21,000 (2007)
- Language family: Sino-Tibetan: Tibeto-Burman; Lolo–Burmese; Loloish; Southern; Jino
- Dialects: Youle Jino; Buyuan Jino

Language codes
- ISO 639-3: Either: jiu – Youle Jinuo jiy – Buyuan Jinuo
- Glottolog: youl1235

The Jino language (Jinuo 基諾語; autonyms: tɕy˦no˦, ki˦ɲo˦) constitutes a pair of Loloish language varieties spoken by the Jino people of Yunnan, China.

== Varieties ==
In total, there are about 28,320 Jinuo people living in China. A total of 70–80% of Jinuo people can speak either of the Jino varieties fluently. The Jino language constitutes the two subdialects of Youle Jino and Buyuan Jinuo, and they are not mutually intelligible.

Buyuan Jino is spoken by 21,000 people; most of the speakers are monolingual, which means they only speak Buyuan Jino. There is no official written form. Most Jino people also speak one of the Tai languages or Chinese. The ISO 639-3 code for the Jino varieties are "jiu" for Youle Jino and "jiy" for Buyuan Jino. The Glottocodes for the Jino varieties are "youl1235" for Youle Jino and "buyu1238" for Buyuan Jino.

== Classification ==
The exact classification of Jino within the Loloish branch of Sino-Tibetan language family remains uncertain. Jino is classified as a Southern Loloish (Hanoish) language by Ziwo Lama (2012), but as a Central Loloish language by Bradley (2007). Jino is also classified as a Southern Loloish language in Satterthwaite-Phillips' (2011) computational phylogenetic analysis of the Lolo-Burmese languages.

== History ==
The use of Jino is rapidly declining: in the 1980s, 70–80% of the Jino people used Jino; in 2000, less than 50% of the population could speak Jino.

The Jino people were recognized by the state council on 6 June 1979 as the last recognized minority nationality in China.

Historically, the Jino people were organized as a matriarchal culture, and “Jino” means “descending from the uncle,” and it refers to the importance of mother’s brother in matriarchal societies.

From a language aspect, Jino is similar to other languages under the branch of the Tibeto-Burman languages, because the Jino people moved from the northwest of Yunnan province to the territories they are at now, but the timing and routes of this migration remain uncertain.

== Geographic distribution ==
Jino is spoken in Jinuo Township (Jinuo Mountain), located in Jinghong City of the Sipsongpanna Dai autonomous prefecture of Yunnan province, China.

== Tonemes ==
The Youle Jino language features five tonemes: /55/, /44/, /33/, /31/, and /35/, with /35/ primarily appearing in loanwords. The tonal system of Jino, as spoken in Baka village, aligns closely with the previously reconstructed *Proto-Lolo tones. Specifically, the *Proto-Lolo H and L tones correspond to Baka’s T1 and T4, respectively, while *Proto-Lolo tone 2 and tone 3 align with Baka’s T2 and T3. Notably, *Proto-Lolo tone 1 has evolved in Baka into a unique tone with variable pitch values, resulting in a distinctive iambic pattern.

There are five tonemes in Buyuan Jino. Gai believes that the function of tonemes are distinguishing lexical meanings and grammatical meanings.

1. /˥/ (high level tone, 55): it tends to phonetically shorten vowels
2. /˦/ (mid level tone, 44): lower than 55, though still high
3. /˧˩/ (low falling tone, 31)
4. /˧˥/ (rising tone, 35)
5. /˥˧/ (high falling tone, 53)

/˥˧/ (53) tone is considered difficult to distinguish when listening to a native speaker.

== Writing system ==
Jino does not have an official writing system, but it developed several systems of signs to cover communication in different situations. The Jino used engraved wooden or bamboo boards to record debts between villages.
