= Enu language =

Language spoken in China

Enu
- Ximoluo
- Native to: China
- Region: Yunnan
- Ethnicity: Hani
- Native speakers: 14,000 (2009)
- Language family: Sino-Tibetan: Tibeto-Burman; Lolo–Burmese; Loloish; Southern; Bi-Ka; Piyo; Enu

Language codes
- ISO 639-3: enu
- Glottolog: enuu1235

Enu or Ximoluo (Chinese: 西摩洛语; pinyin: Xīmóluòyǔ; autonym: ŋɔ31 ŋjv̩31) is a Hanoish language of the Bi-Ka branch spoken by 14,000 people of the Hani ethnic group. It is spoken in the counties of Mojiang, Jiangcheng, and Luchun in Yunnan, China.

== Distribution ==
Ximoluo is spoken mostly in Yayi Township (雅邑乡), south-central Mojiang County, where most of the locals are classified as ethnic Hani, Han, Yi, and Dai. There are more than 8,000 Ximoluo people in Yayi Township, in the villages of Yayi (雅邑), Xuka (徐卡), Nanwen (南温), Zuoxi (座细), and Nanniwan (南泥湾), and also smaller numbers in Xialuopu (下洛浦), Baga (巴嘎), and Bali (坝利).

== Works cited ==
- Jiang, Ying 蒋颖; Cui, Xia 崔霞; Qiao, Xiang 乔翔 (2009). Xīmóluòyǔ yánjiū 西摩洛语研究 [A Study of Ximoluo] (in Chinese). Beijing: Minzu chubanshe.
