= Baihong language =

Southern Loloish language of Yunnan, China

Baihong
- Behong
- Native to: China
- Region: Yunnan
- Ethnicity: Hani
- Language family: Sino-Tibetan: Tibeto-Burman; Lolo–Burmese; Loloish; Southern; Hani; Honi; Baihong

Language codes
- ISO 639-3: None (mis)
- Glottolog: baih1238

Baihong (Chinese: 白宏) is a Southern Loloish language of Yunnan, China. It is spoken in Jiangcheng Hani and Yi Autonomous County, Mojiang Hani Autonomous County, Yuanjiang Hani, Yi and Dai Autonomous County, Lüchun County, and Yuanyang County, Yunnan.

The Diema 垤玛 dialect of Honghe County is a Baihong variety.
