= Angluo language =

Southern Loloish language of Yunnan, China

Angluo
- Gehe
- Native to: China
- Region: Yunnan
- Ethnicity: Hani
- Language family: Sino-Tibetan: (Tibeto-Burman); Lolo–Burmese; Loloish; Southern; Angluo

Language codes
- ISO 639-3: None (mis)
- Glottolog: angl1266

Angluo (Chinese: 昂罗; Hhaqlol, IPA: ɣa21 lo55) is a Southern Loloish language of Yunnan, China. Angluo is spoken in Jinping Miao, Yao, and Dai Autonomous County and Yuanyang County, Yunnan (including in Xinjie Town 新街镇).

In Yuanyang County, Yunnan, the Angluo are found in the four townships of Xinjie 新街, Huangmaoling 黄茅岭, Panzhihua 攀枝花, and Niujiaozhai 牛角寨 (Yang & Lu 2011).

The Angluo language has been documented by Zhang (1998) and Yang & Lu (2011). It is not the same as the Gehuo language, which also goes by the names Angluo and Gehe.
