= Zhengdong, Yunnan =

Zhengdong 整董镇
- Town
- Location in China and Yunnan Zhengdong (China)
- Coordinates: 22°28′55″N 101°30′28″E
- Country: China
- Province: Yunnan
- Prefecture-level city: Pu'er City
- Autonomous County: Jiangcheng Hani and Yi Autonomous County

Area
  - Total: 118 sq mi (305 km^{2})
- Elevation: 2,790 ft (850 m)

Population (2017)
  - Total: 11,963
- Postal Code: 665903

Zhengdong (Chinese: 整董; pinyin: Zhěngdǒng) is a town in the Jiangcheng Hani and Yi Autonomous County of Yunnan in China. It had an estimated population of 11,693 in 2017.

The people of Zhendong mainly speak Southwestern Mandarin, and the majority are Dai people native of Yunnan. The phone area code is 0879. The nearest airport is Pu'er Simao Airport.

== Overview ==
Due to the erratic elevation, ranging from 820 metres (the majority of the town) to 1,698 metres in Beiyin Mountain, the layout is very unorganized, with most of the residents living in the flat part of the town. The annual average temperature is 19.6 °C (67.3 °F), the sunshine hours 1,695, and rainfall 290 mm (11 in). The entire town has fertile soil and abundant rainfall, giving it a humid subtropical climate (CFA). Thanks to its climate, it is one of the main grain-producing areas of its county. Its land is suitable for planting subtropical crops such as corn, sugar cane, tea, coffee, and fruits. It surrounds three villages, Zhengdong Village, Mantan, Shuishan and 44 other smaller groups of communities. Jiangcheng Farm is the main farm of the town and the entire county, further emphasizing its agricultural importance. It is located on the Laos Border. Its water, electrical and access rate are respectively: 71%, 73.7% and 97.3%.

== Villages ==
As of 2020, it administers three villages: Zhengdong Village, Mantan Village (曼滩村), and Huashiban Village (滑石板村).

== Population ==
Its population was 11,963 in 2017 according to the National Bureau of Statistics. Along with Dai, its other main ethnic groups are Hani, Yao, Yi and Han.
