= Kaduo language =

Sino-Tibetan language

Kaduo
- Khatu
- Native to: China
- Region: Yunnan
- Ethnicity: Hani
- Native speakers: 20,000 (2011)
- Language family: Sino-Tibetan: (Tibeto-Burman); Lolo–Burmese; Loloish; Southern; Bi-Ka; Piyo; Kaduo

Language codes
- ISO 639-3: ktp
- Glottolog: kadu1253
- ELP: Kaduo

Kaduo (Khatu; Chinese: 卡多; pinyin: Kǎduō) is a Southern Loloish language spoken in Mojiang, Jiangcheng, Ning'er, Zhenyuan, and Xinping counties of Yunnan, China by about 20,000 people.

Zhu (2011) covered the Kaduo dialect of Shilong Village (石龙村), Mengnong Ethnic Yi Township (孟弄彝族乡), Mojiang County (墨江县).

== Distribution ==
In Xinping County, Yunnan, Kaduo is spoken in the following locations.

- Wajiao Village, Jianxing Township 建兴乡挖窖村
- Jianxing Village, Jianxing Township 建兴乡建兴村
- Wasi Village, Pingzhang Township 平掌乡瓦寺村
- Baizhi Village, Pingzhang Township 平掌乡柏枝村
- Shengli Village, Mosha Township 漠沙乡胜利村
