= Honghe County =

Honghe County 红河县
- County
- Location of Honghe County in Honghe Prefecture within Yunnan province

- Location of the seat in Yunnan
- Coordinates: 23°16′N 102°13′E
- Country: People's Republic of China
- Province: Yunnan
- Autonomous prefecture: Honghe

Area
  - Total: 2,034 km^{2} (785 sq mi)

Population
  - Total: 270,000
  - Density: 130/km^{2} (340/sq mi)
- Time zone: UTC+8 (CST)
- Postal code: 654400
- Area code: 0873
- Website: www.ynhh.gov.cn

Honghe County (simplified Chinese: 红河县; traditional Chinese: 紅河縣; pinyin: Hónghé Xiàn) is located in Honghe Hani and Yi Autonomous Prefecture, Yunnan province, China. It borders Yuanyang County, Yunnan and Jianshui County to the east, Lüchun County to the south, Mojiang County to the west, Yuanjiang County to the northwest, and Shiping County to the north.

== Administrative divisions ==
In the present, Honghe County has 5 towns and 8 townships.

5 towns

- Yisa (迤萨镇)
- Jiayin (甲寅镇)
- Baohua (宝华镇)
- Leyu (乐育镇)
- Langdi (浪堤镇)

8 townships

- Luoen (洛恩乡)
- Shitouzhai (石头寨乡)
- Azhahe (阿扎河乡)
- Dayangjie (大羊街乡)
- Chegu (车古乡)
- Jiache (架车乡)
- Diema (垤玛乡)
- Sancun (三村乡)

== Climate ==
Climate data for Honghe, elevation 975 m (3,199 ft), (1991–2020 normals, extremes 1981–present)
Month	Jan	Feb	Mar	Apr	May	Jun	Jul	Aug	Sep	Oct	Nov	Dec	Year
Record high °C (°F)	30.4 (86.7)	33.5 (92.3)	35.6 (96.1)	38.5 (101.3)	40.4 (104.7)	37.5 (99.5)	38.1 (100.6)	35.6 (96.1)	36.0 (96.8)	34.6 (94.3)	33.4 (92.1)	30.5 (86.9)	40.4 (104.7)
Mean daily maximum °C (°F)	19.5 (67.1)	22.6 (72.7)	26.6 (79.9)	29.9 (85.8)	30.8 (87.4)	30.7 (87.3)	29.6 (85.3)	29.8 (85.6)	29.2 (84.6)	26.5 (79.7)	23.8 (74.8)	20.1 (68.2)	26.6 (79.9)
Daily mean °C (°F)	13.9 (57.0)	16.1 (61.0)	19.6 (67.3)	22.9 (73.2)	24.7 (76.5)	25.5 (77.9)	24.8 (76.6)	24.7 (76.5)	23.8 (74.8)	21.4 (70.5)	18.2 (64.8)	14.7 (58.5)	20.9 (69.6)
Mean daily minimum °C (°F)	10.7 (51.3)	12.3 (54.1)	15.2 (59.4)	18.4 (65.1)	20.8 (69.4)	22.3 (72.1)	22.0 (71.6)	21.6 (70.9)	20.6 (69.1)	18.4 (65.1)	14.8 (58.6)	11.6 (52.9)	17.4 (63.3)
Record low °C (°F)	2.8 (37.0)	3.5 (38.3)	2.6 (36.7)	7.3 (45.1)	12.8 (55.0)	15.7 (60.3)	17.1 (62.8)	17.2 (63.0)	12.8 (55.0)	11.8 (53.2)	6.4 (43.5)	−0.6 (30.9)	−0.6 (30.9)
Average precipitation mm (inches)	28.6 (1.13)	18.1 (0.71)	24.8 (0.98)	59.1 (2.33)	99.8 (3.93)	122.1 (4.81)	157.3 (6.19)	117.6 (4.63)	69.4 (2.73)	69.4 (2.73)	43.6 (1.72)	19.1 (0.75)	828.9 (32.64)
Average precipitation days (≥ 0.1 mm)	4.3	4.0	5.6	9.8	13.6	15.7	19.0	16.7	11.5	10.6	5.3	4.2	120.3
Average snowy days	0.1	0	0	0	0	0	0	0	0	0	0	0	0.1
Average relative humidity (%)	76	70	68	66	69	75	80	79	77	77	75	75	74
Mean monthly sunshine hours	173.7	182.3	199.9	209.7	201.7	146.9	130.5	152.3	153.0	142.4	176.8	165.5	2,034.7
Percentage possible sunshine	51	57	54	55	49	36	32	38	42	40	54	50	47
Source: China Meteorological Administration all-time extreme temperatureall-time November record high
