= Hani language =

Loloish language in Southeast Asia

Hani
- Haqniqdoq
- Native to: Laos, Myanmar, South China, Vietnam
- Ethnicity: Hani
- Native speakers: 770,000 (2007–2019)
- Language family: Sino-Tibetan: (Tibeto-Burman); Lolo–Burmese; Loloish; Southern; Hanoid; Hani

Language codes
- ISO 639-3: hni
- Glottolog: hani1248

The Hani language (Hani: Haqniqdoq or xa31 ɲi31; simplified Chinese: 哈尼语; traditional Chinese: 哈尼語; pinyin: Hāníyǔ; Vietnamese: Tiếng Hà Nhì) is a language of the Loloish (Yi) branch of the Tibeto-Burman linguistic group spoken in China, Laos, Myanmar, and Vietnam by the Hani people.

== Distribution ==
In China, Hani is spoken mostly in areas to the east of the Mekong River in south-central Yunnan province, mostly in Pu'er and Honghe prefectures, as well as in parts of other surrounding prefectures. Hani is also spoken in Lai Châu and Lào Cai provinces of northwestern Vietnam and in Phongsaly Province of Laos along the border with Yunnan.

Edmondson (2002) reports that the Hani of Vietnam are distributed in two provinces of northwestern Vietnam where two distinct dialects are found, one east of Muong Te and the other to the west. The Hani of Vietnam claim to be able to communicate in the Hani language with ethnic Hani from different areas of Vietnam despite significant geographical barriers. Edmondson (2002) reports that the different Hani speech varieties in Vietnam differ mostly in lexicon.

== Phonology ==
Hani has three main tones and two types of short vowels.

=== Consonants ===
Consonants of the Luchun dialect
		Labial		Alveolar		(Alveolo-) palatal	Velar
		plain	pal.	plain	sibilant	(Alveolo-) palatal	Velar
Plosive/ Affricate	voiceless	p	pʲ	t	ts	tɕ	k
Plosive/ Affricate	aspirated	pʰ	pʰʲ	tʰ	tsʰ	tɕʰ	kʰ
Plosive/ Affricate	voiced	b	bʲ	d	dz	dʑ	ɡ
Fricative	voiceless	f			s	ɕ	x
Fricative	voiced				z		ɣ
Nasal		m	mʲ	n		ȵ	ŋ
Approximant				l		j	

=== Vowels ===
Vowel length in Hani is also distinctive.

Vowels of the Luchun dialect
	Front		Central	Back	
High	i			ɯ	u
Mid	e	ø		ɤ	o
Mid				ɔ	
Low			a		
Syllabic	ɹ̩				

		Front	Back	
Diphthong	Close		ue	
Diphthong	Mid	ie	iɤ	iɔ
Diphthong	Open	ia	ua	

== Orthography ==
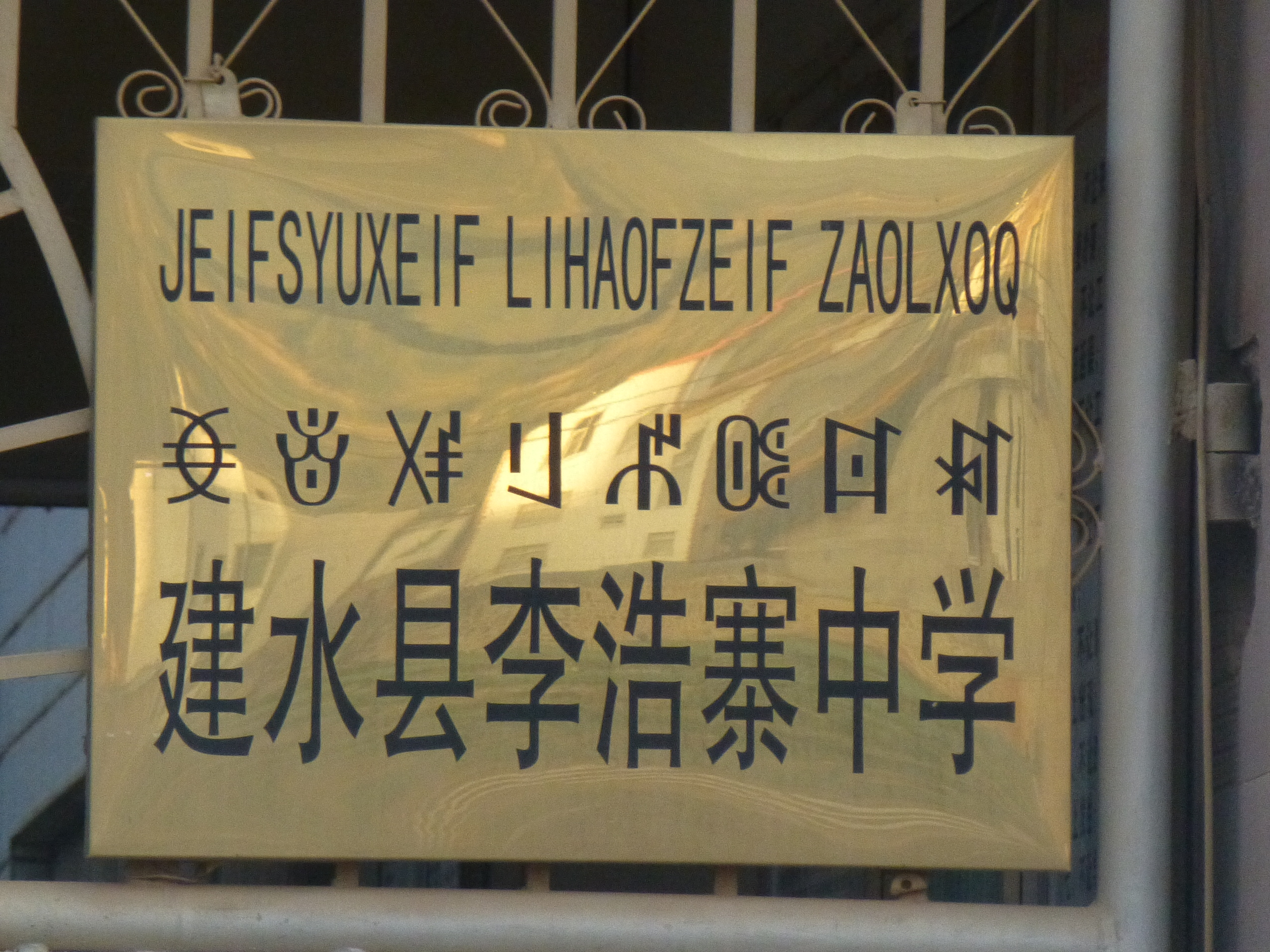
Sign for the Lihaozhai Township High School, in Jianshui County, Yunnan, written in Hani (alphabetic), Yi (syllabic) and Chinese. The Chinese, if transcribed in Hanyu Pinyin, would be Jianshuixian Lihaozhai zhongxue.

Oral tradition tells of an ancient written script for Hani but says it was lost when the Hani migrated from Sichuan. In China, Standard Hani, which is based on the Lüchun County dialect, is written using a Latin-based script developed by the Chinese government during the 1950s. As with the Latin-based scripts of the Zhuang, Hmong and Iu Mien languages, it uses final consonant letters to represent tone.

Consonants in Hani orthography are pronounced the same as in pinyin, with two additional digraphs for voiced fricatives in Hani. The IPA equivalents for letters in Hani orthography are provided below.

Hani	IPA
hh	ɣ
ss	z

The vowels in Hani orthography are as follows. After vowels, -v is used to mark tense vowels.

Hani	IPA
a	a
ao	ɔ
e	ɤ
ee	ɯ
ei	e
i	i
o	o
u	u
yu	ø
ii	ɨ

There are four tones, which are marked by letters at the ends of words, or not at all for the mid-level [33]. Numerical Chao tones are provided below.

Hani	IPA
l	[55] (high level)
(none)	[33] (mid level)
q	[31] (low falling)
f	[24] (rising)

The letter v at the end of a syllable indicates buzzing vowels (represented with a minus sign below ◌̠ in IPA), and it can be followed by a tone letter.

== Sample text ==
Hani	English
Aqsol liq yoqdeivq yoqpyuq bo, meeqyaovq ssolnei colpyuq qiq kov dei. Davqtavcolssaq neenyuq bel neema meeq ya siq, laongaoq meilnaol nadul meil e gaq ssol hhyul hha bavqduv nia.	All human beings are born free and equal in dignity and rights. They are endowed with reason and conscience and should act towards one another in a spirit of brotherhood.

== See also ==
- Hani languages
