= Lüchun County =

Lüchun County 绿春县
- County

- Location of Lüchun County in Honghe Prefecture within Yunnan province

- Location of the seat in Yunnan
- Coordinates: 22°59′38″N 102°23′31″E
- Country: People's Republic of China
- Province: Yunnan
- Prefecture: Honghe

Area
  - Total: 3,167 km^{2} (1,223 sq mi)

Population
  - Total: 200,000
  - Density: 63/km^{2} (160/sq mi)
- Time zone: UTC+8 (CST)
- Postal code: 662500
- Area code: 0873
- Website: www.hhlc.gov.cn

Lüchun County (simplified Chinese: 绿春县; traditional Chinese: 綠春縣; pinyin: Lǜchūn Xiàn) is located in Honghe Hani and Yi Autonomous Prefecture, in the south of Yunnan province, China, bordering Vietnam's Lai Châu Province to the south.

== Geography ==
Lüchun is located in southwestern Honghe Prefecture in southeastern Yunnan. It borders Honghe County to the north, Jinping Miao, Yao and Dai Autonomous County and Yuanyang County, Yunnan to the east, Jiangcheng County to the west and Mojiang County to the northwest. It also borders the Muong Te District of Lai Châu Province, Vietnam to the south.

== Administrative divisions ==
Lüchun County has 4 towns and 5 townships.

4 towns

- Daxing (大兴镇)
- Niukong (牛孔镇)
- Daheishan (大黑山镇)
- Pinghe (平河镇)

5 townships

- Gekui (戈奎乡)
- Dashuigou (大水沟乡)
- Banpo (半坡乡)
- Qimaba (骑马坝乡)
- Sanmeng (三猛乡)

Lüchun County was created in 1958 from 6 village offices of Yuanyang County, Honghe County, Jinping County and Mojiang County.

== Ethnic groups ==
The Lüchun County Gazetteer (1992) lists the following ethnic Hani subgroups (highlighted in bold) and their respective locations.

- **Ha'ou 哈欧**
  - Daxing 大兴: Chanong 岔弄, Laobian 老边, Mazong 马宗
  - Sanmeng 三猛区: Tongzhu 桐珠, Hade 哈德
- **Qidi 期弟, Asong 阿松**
  - Niukong 牛孔, Dashuigou 大水沟, Daheishan 大黑山
- **Guozuo 果作**
  - Pinghe District 平河区: Cheli 车里, Xinzhai 新寨, Dongha 东哈, Zedong 则东 (townships 乡)
- **Biyue 碧约, Kaduo 卡多, Ximoluo 西摩洛**
  - Niukong 牛孔, Daheishan 大黑山, Banpo 半坡, Qimaba 骑马坝 (districts 区)
- **Baihong 白宏**
  - Dashuigou District 大水沟区

Ethnic Yi subgroups (all of which speak Southern Yi language varieties according to Lüchun 1992) and their respective locations are:

- **Achang 阿常**
  - Niukong 牛孔
- **Pulian 普连**
  - Qimaba 骑马坝, Daxing 大兴, Gekui 戈奎
- **Alu 阿鲁**
  - Dashuigou 大水沟

The Luoluopo 倮倮颇 (lo33 lo55 pho21) or Luopo 倮颇 (lo55 pho21) are found in Luopan Shangzhai 罗盘上寨, Jinping County and in Zhongzhai 中寨, Dashuigou 大水沟 Township, Lüchun County. The Luopo of Jinping believe that their ancestors had migrated from Pu'er and Mojiang County, while the Luopo of Lüchun believe that their ancestors had migrated from Dali.

== Climate ==
Climate data for Lüchun, elevation 1,643 m (5,390 ft), (1991–2020 normals, extremes 1981–present)
Month	Jan	Feb	Mar	Apr	May	Jun	Jul	Aug	Sep	Oct	Nov	Dec	Year
Record high °C (°F)	25.2 (77.4)	27.5 (81.5)	29.6 (85.3)	31.0 (87.8)	31.2 (88.2)	29.3 (84.7)	29.6 (85.3)	30.3 (86.5)	30.0 (86.0)	27.8 (82.0)	26.0 (78.8)	24.2 (75.6)	31.2 (88.2)
Mean daily maximum °C (°F)	17.7 (63.9)	20.0 (68.0)	22.9 (73.2)	24.7 (76.5)	24.9 (76.8)	24.8 (76.6)	24.6 (76.3)	25.1 (77.2)	24.4 (75.9)	22.1 (71.8)	20.2 (68.4)	17.5 (63.5)	22.4 (72.3)
Daily mean °C (°F)	12.3 (54.1)	14.3 (57.7)	17.3 (63.1)	19.2 (66.6)	20.1 (68.2)	20.5 (68.9)	20.3 (68.5)	20.3 (68.5)	19.4 (66.9)	17.4 (63.3)	14.7 (58.5)	12.1 (53.8)	17.3 (63.2)
Mean daily minimum °C (°F)	8.9 (48.0)	10.4 (50.7)	13.3 (55.9)	15.1 (59.2)	16.7 (62.1)	18.1 (64.6)	18.0 (64.4)	17.7 (63.9)	16.8 (62.2)	14.8 (58.6)	11.5 (52.7)	9.0 (48.2)	14.2 (57.5)
Record low °C (°F)	0.8 (33.4)	1.6 (34.9)	−1.1 (30.0)	6.2 (43.2)	9.4 (48.9)	13.3 (55.9)	14.7 (58.5)	14.0 (57.2)	9.7 (49.5)	7.6 (45.7)	3.0 (37.4)	−1.2 (29.8)	−1.2 (29.8)
Average precipitation mm (inches)	43.6 (1.72)	27.8 (1.09)	46.9 (1.85)	96.1 (3.78)	241.1 (9.49)	362.5 (14.27)	421.6 (16.60)	290.8 (11.45)	194.8 (7.67)	162.0 (6.38)	68.5 (2.70)	40.1 (1.58)	1,995.8 (78.58)
Average precipitation days (≥ 0.1 mm)	5.8	5.1	7.1	12.1	19.1	25.0	27.1	24.4	19.0	16.2	7.8	5.5	174.2
Average snowy days	0.1	0	0	0	0	0	0	0	0	0	0	0	0.1
Average relative humidity (%)	75	66	61	67	76	85	87	86	84	84	81	79	78
Mean monthly sunshine hours	206.8	217.4	232.8	220.3	186.0	104.0	93.0	121.4	128.3	129.9	175.8	181.4	1,997.1
Percentage possible sunshine	61	67	62	58	45	26	23	31	35	36	54	55	46
Source: China Meteorological Administrationall-time August high
