= Piyo language =

Loloish language of Yunnan, China

Piyo
- Native to: China, Laos
- Ethnicity: Hani
- Native speakers: (120,000 cited 1997)
- Language family: Sino-Tibetan: Tibeto-Burman; Lolo–Burmese; Loloish; Southern; Bi-Ka; Piyo

Language codes
- ISO 639-3: byo
- Glottolog: biyo1243

Piyo (Biyo, Biyue; pi31 jɔ31 (Jing 2015:11)) is a Loloish language of China. The people are ethnic Hani, and the "Bi-Ka" varieties (Biyo, Kaduo, Enu) are traditionally considered dialects of Hani. However, in the classifications of Bradley (2007) and Lama (2012), they are more distinct from Hani than other related languages are. Lama classifies Mpi as closer to Biyo dialect than Kaduo is.

In Mojiang County, the Upper Biyo (a31tʰa̠31 pi31jɔ31) and Lower Biyo (a31va̠31 pi31jɔ31) varieties are mutually intelligible (Jing 2015:11).
