= Honi language =

Sino-Tibetan language spoken in China and Southeast Asia

Honi
- Native to: Southern China, Vietnam, Laos, Myanmar
- Ethnicity: Hani
- Native speakers: 140,000 (2007)
- Language family: Sino-Tibetan: Tibeto-Burman; Lolo–Burmese; Loloish; Southern; Hanoid; Honi
- Dialects: Baihong; Haoni

Language codes
- ISO 639-3: how
- Glottolog: honi1244

The Honi language (豪尼語), also known as Haoni, Baihong, Hao-Bai, or Ho, is a language of the Loloish (Yi) branch of the Tibeto-Burman linguistic group spoken in Yunnan, China. The Chinese government groups speakers of this language into the Hani nationality, one of China's 56 recognized nationalities and considers the language to be a dialect of the wider Hani languages. Honi itself is divided into two distinct dialects, Baihong and Haoni, which may be separate languages.

== Phonology ==
=== Consonants ===
Consonants of the Mojiang dialect
		Labial	Alveolar		Post- alveolar	Palatal	Velar
		Labial	plain	sibilant	Post- alveolar	Palatal	Velar
Nasal		m	n			ȵ	ŋ
Plosive/ Affricate	unaspirated	p	t	ts	tʃ	tɕ	k
Plosive/ Affricate	aspirated	pʰ	tʰ	tsʰ	tʃʰ	tɕʰ	kʰ
Continuant	voiceless	f	l̥	s	ʃ	ɕ	x
Continuant	voiced	v	l	z	ʒ		ɣ
Semivowel		w				j	

A voiceless /l̥/ may also be realized as a lateral fricative [ɬ].

=== Vowels ===
Vowels of the Mojiang dialect
	Front		Central	Back	
High	i			ɯ	u
High-mid				ɤ	o
Low-mid	ɛ			ɔ	
Low	æ		a		
Syllabic	v̩	ɹ̩			

In the Mojiang dialect, vowel length is distinctive among vowels /iː ɛː/ and syllabic vowels /v̩ː ɹ̩ː/.

		Front		Back
Diphthong	Close	iu		ui
Diphthong	Mid	io	iɔ	uɛ
Diphthong	Open	ia		ua
Nasal	Close	ĩ		
Nasal	Mid	ɛ̃	õ	
Nasal	Open	ã		
Nasal Diphthong	Mid	ĩɛ̃	ĩõ	ũɛ̃
Nasal Diphthong	Open	ĩã		ũã
