= Loloish languages =

Family of fifty to a hundred Sino-Tibetan languages

Loloish
- Yi, Ngwi, Nisoic
- Geographic distribution: Southern China, Southeast Asia and South Asia
- Ethnicity: Yi people
- Linguistic classification: Sino-Tibetan: Tibeto-Burman; Lolo-Burmese; Loloish
- Proto-language: Proto-Loloish
- Subdivisions: Hanoish (Southern); Lahoish; ?Naxish; Nusoish; Kazhuoish; Lisoish (Central); Nisoish (Northern and Southeastern); ?’Ugong; (?) Lawoish; (?) Jino

Language codes
- Glottolog: lolo1267

The Loloish languages, also known as Yi (like the Yi people) and occasionally Ngwi or Nisoic, are a sub-branch of 50–100 Tibeto-Burman languages spoken primarily in the Yunnan province of Southwestern China. They are most closely related to Burmese and its relatives. Both the Loloish and Burmish branches are well defined, as is their superior node, Lolo-Burmese. However, sub-classification is more contentious.

The 2013 edition of Ethnologue estimated a total number of 9 million native speakers of Loloish ("Ngwi") languages, the largest group being the speakers of Nuosu (Northern Yi) at 2 million speakers.

2000 PRC Census
ISO 639-3	Language	Speakers
hle	Hlersu	15000
jiy	Buyuan Jinuo	1000
jiu	Youle Jinuo	10000
lkc	Kucong	46870
lhu	Lahu	530350
lhi	Lahu Shi	196200
ywt	Xishanba Lalo	213000
yik	Dongshanba Lalo	30000
yit	Eastern Lalu	38000
ywl	Western Lalu	38000
llh	Lamu	120
yne	Lang'e	2000
lwu	Lawu	50
ylm	Limi	29000
lpo	Lipo	250000
lis	Lisu	942700
ycl	Lolopo	380000
ysp	Southern Lolopo	190000
ymh	Mili	23000
yiq	Miqie	30000
nuf	Nusu	12670
ysn	Sani	100000
yta	Talu	13600
ytl	Tanglang	950
zal	Zauzou	2100
yna	Aluo	25000
yiu	Awu	20000
yyz	Ayizi	50
ych	Chesu	3300
ygp	Gepo	100000
kaf	Katso	4000
ylo	Naluo Yi	15000
ywu	Wumeng Nasu	150000
yig	Wusa Nasu	500000
iii	Sichuan Yi	2000000
ysd	Samatao	400
smh	Samei	20000
ysy	Sanie	8000
ywq	Wuding-Luquan Yi	250000
yif	Ache	35000
aub	Alugu	3500
yix	Axi Yi	100000
aza	Azha	53000
yiz	Azhe	54000
ybk	Bokha	10000
ykt	Kathu	5000
ykl	Khlula	21000
ykn	Kua-nsi	5000
yku	Kuamasi	1000
lgh	Laghuu	300
nty	Mantsi	1100
ymi	Moji	2000
ymx	Northern Muji	9000
ymq	Qila Muji	1500
ymc	Southern Muji	26000
ymz	Muzi	10000
yso	Nisi (China)	36000
nos	Eastern Nisu	75000
yiv	Northern Nisu	160000
nsf	Northwestern Nisu	24000
nsd	Southern Nisu	210000
nsv	Southwestern Nisu	15000
ypa	Phala	12000
ypg	Phola	13000
ypo	Alo Phola	500
yip	Pholo	30000
ypn	Ani Phowa	10000
yhl	Hlepho Phowa	36000
ypb	Labo Phowa	17000
phh	Phukha	10000
ypm	Phuma	8000
ypp	Phupa	3000
yph	Phupha	1300
ypz	Phuza	6000
ysg	Sonaga	2000
ytp	Thopho	200
yzk	Zokhuo	13000
weu	Rawngtu Chin	12400
ahk	Akha	563960
bzi	Bisu	240
byo	Biyo	120000
ycp	Chepya	2000
cnc	Côông	2030
enu	Enu	30000
hni	Hani	758620
how	Honi	140000
ktp	Kaduo	185000
lwm	Laomian	1600
lov	Lopi	not included
mpz	Mpi	900
ymd	Muda	2000
phq	Phana'	350
pho	Phunoi	35600
pyy	Pyen	700
sgk	Sangkong	1500
slt	Sila	2480
lbg	Laopang	9550
ugo	Ugong	80
Total		9078770

== Names ==
Loloish is the traditional name for the family in English. Some publications avoid the term under the misapprehension that Lolo is pejorative, but it is the Chinese rendition of the autonym of the Yi people and is pejorative only in writing when it is written with a particular Chinese character (one that uses the radical for beast, rather than a human radical, simplified Chinese: 猓猡; traditional Chinese: 猓玀; pinyin: luǒluó), a practice that was prohibited by the Chinese government in the 1950s.

David Bradley uses the term Ngwi, and Lama (2012) uses Nisoic. Ethnologue has adopted 'Ngwi', but Glottolog retains 'Loloish'. Paul K. Benedict coined the term Yipho, from Chinese Yi and a common autonymic element (-po or -pho), but it never gained wide usage.

== Internal classification ==
=== Bradley (2007) ===
Loloish was traditionally divided into a northern branch, with Lisu and the numerous Yi languages and a southern branch, with everything else. However, per Bradley and Thurgood there is also a central branch, with languages from both northern and southern. Bradley adds a fourth, southeastern branch.

- Northern Loloish: Nuosu (2 million), Nasu (1.0 million), etc.
- Central Loloish: Lisu (940,000)–Lipho (250,000) (incl. Lolopo (570,000), Lalo (320,000)), Micha (50,000), Lahu (600,000), Jinuo (21,000), etc.
- Southern Loloish: Akha–Hani, Phunoi–Bisu, Pholo and ’Ugong (aberrant; removed in Bradley 1997)
- Southeastern Loloish: Nisu, Phula, Sani, Azha, Khlula, Muji, Phowa, etc.

Ugong is divergent; Bradley (1997) places it with the Burmish languages. The Tujia language is difficult to classify due to divergent vocabulary. Other unclassified Loloish languages are Gokhy (Gɔkhý), Lopi and Ache.

=== Lama (2012) ===
Lama (2012) classified 36 Lolo–Burmese languages based on a computational analysis of shared phonological and lexical innovations. He finds the Mondzish languages to be a separate branch of Lolo-Burmese, which Lama considers to have split off before Burmish did. The rest of the Loloish languages are as follows:

- Loloish
  - Hanoish: Jino, Akha–Hani languages, Bisoid languages, etc. (See)
  - - Lahoish: Lahu, Kucong
    - - Naxish: Naxi, Namuyi
      - - Nusoish: Nusu, Zauzou (Rouruo)
        - Ni ‑ Li ‑ Ka
          - Kazhuoish: Katso (Kazhuo), Samu (Samatao), Sanie, Sadu, Meuma
          - - Lisoish: Lisu, Lolopo, etc. (See)
            - Nisoish: Nisoid languages, Axi-Puoid languages

The Nisoish, Lisoish, and Kazhuoish clusters are closely related, forming a clade ("Ni-Li-Ka") at about the same level as the other five branches of Loloish. Lama's Naxish clade has been classified as Qiangic rather than Loloish by Guillaume Jacques and Alexis Michaud (see Qiangic languages).

A Lawoish (Lawu) branch has also been recently proposed.

Satterthwaite-Phillips' (2011) computational phylogenetic analysis of the Lolo-Burmese languages does support the inclusion of Naxish (Naic) within Lolo-Burmese, but recognizes Lahoish and Nusoish as coherent language groups that form independent branches of Loloish.
