= Wanyä language =

Loloish language of northern Laos

Wanyä
- Muchi
- Native to: Laos
- Language family: Sino-Tibetan: (Tibeto-Burman); Lolo–Burmese; Loloish; Southern; Siloid; Wanyä

Language codes
- ISO 639-3: None (mis)
- Glottolog: None

Wanyä (autonym: wa11 ɲə11; also called Muchi) is a Loloish language of northern Laos. It is spoken in Ipoeching village, Bun Tay District, Phongsaly Province (Shintani 2001).

== Classification ==
Wanyä is a sister of the Sila cluster of languages that includes Sila, Khir, Cosao, Paza (Phusang), and Phana’ (Bana).

== Sources ==
- Shintani, Tadahiko, Ryuichi Kosaka, and Takashi Kato. 2001. Linguistic Survey of Phongxaly, Lao P.D.R. Tokyo: Institute for the Study of Languages and Cultures of Asia and Africa (ILCAA).
