= Mechanics and Crafts of the People of Annam =

French manuscript with illustrations depicting Vietnamese culture in French Indochina

- French: Technique du peuple annamite; Vietnamese: Kỹ thuật của người An Nam
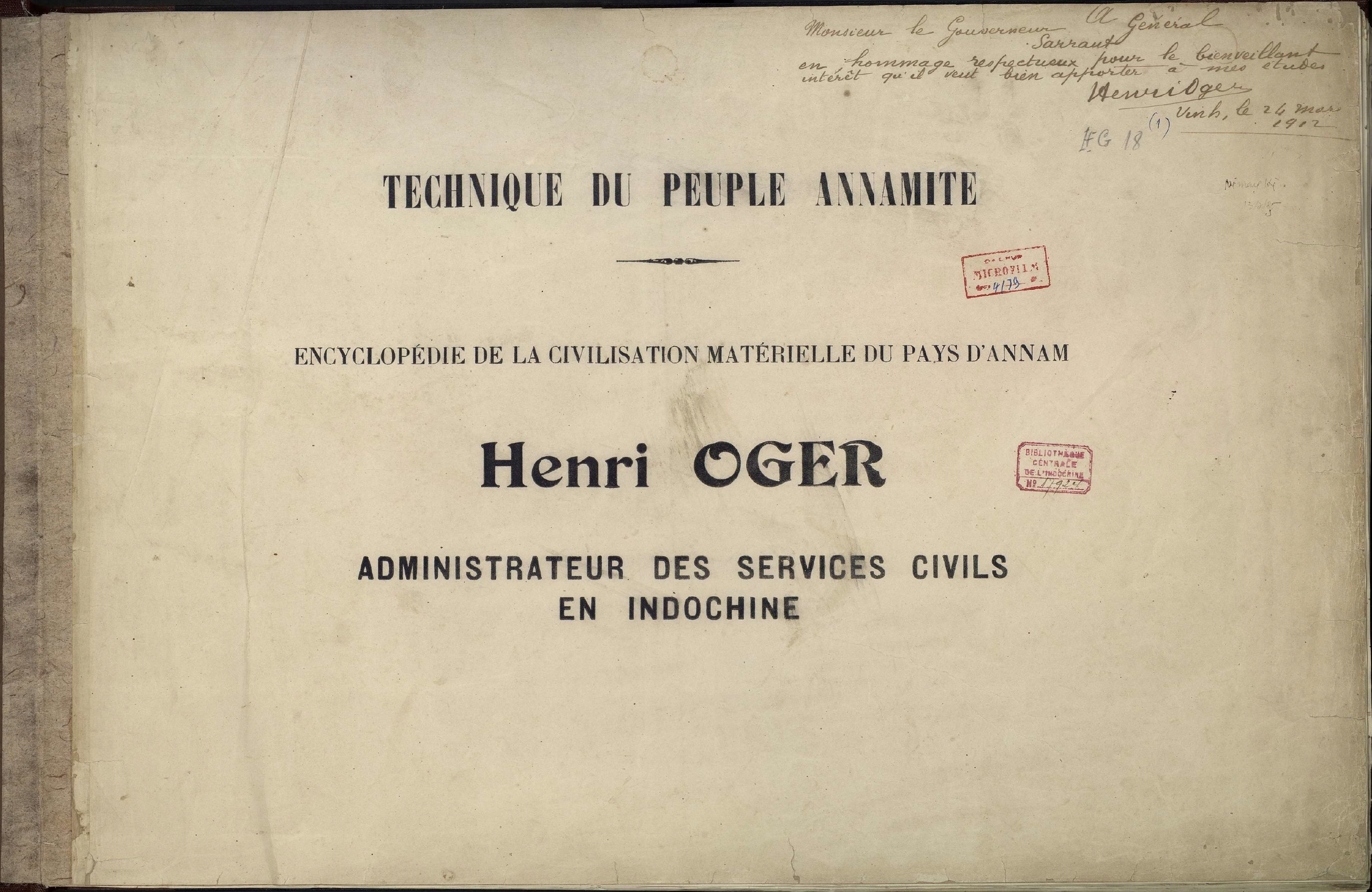
- The first page of Technique du peuple annamite, first published in Hanoi in 1908
- Author(s): Henri Joseph Oger
- Illustrated by: Nguyễn Văn Đăng, Phạm Văn Giai, and unknown Vietnamese artists
- Language: Vietnamese (written in chữ Nôm), French, and Literary Chinese
- First printed edition: 1908–1909

The Mechanics and Crafts of the People of Annam (French: Technique du peuple Annamite; Vietnamese: Kỹ thuật của người An Nam, chữ Nôm: 技術𧵑𠊛安南) is a multi-volume colonial manuscript created by Henri Joseph Oger (1885–1936), a colonial official who commissioned artists to record the culture of the Annamese (Vietnamese) in Hanoi and the area around it during the French colonial administration of Tonkin. The manuscript was published by Henri Joseph Oger in 1908–1909.

== History ==
Starting from 1908, Henri Joseph Oger spent his time in French Indochina doing work as a colonial volunteer until 1919. Oger first came to French Indochina as a soldier. Oger was transferred from Vinh to Hanoi where he spent three years. Oger was tasked with researching the techniques and crafts of the Vietnamese people. He had artists and woodcarvers draw and record every aspect of Vietnamese culture. Oger and the artists went through the streets of Hanoi to record statistics and draw out scenes for the manuscript. In total, approximately 4,577 drawings and sketches were taken and used for the manuscript. Oger also worked with woodcarvers, such as Nguyễn Văn Đăng and Phạm Văn Giai, to help with creating the drawings and the sketches.

Owing to financial and budget issues, Oger managed to publish only 60 copies of the manuscript. It was printed using woodblock printing which was a traditional method of printing in Vietnam. It is likely that the copies were printed at Vũ Thạch temple in Hàng Gai Street (present-day Bà Triệu Street in Hanoi), according to Viện Từ Diển Bách Khoa. In the second volume of the manuscript, Oger said that he set up two workshops in the temple. According to Hoa Bằng, most of Vietnam's early texts were printed in temples since most texts were often Buddhist texts.

After the French colonial period in Vietnam, only two copies remained in Vietnam. One incomplete copy is stored in the National Library of Vietnam (Vietnamese: Thư viện Quốc gia Việt Nam) in Hanoi, and the other copy which was well preserved and is currently being held at General Sciences Library of Ho Chi Minh City (Vietnamese: Thư viện Khoa học Tổng hợp Thành phố Hồ Chí Minh).

In collaboration with École française d'Extrême-Orient (Vietnamese: Viện Viễn Đông Bác cổ Pháp) and General Sciences Library of Ho Chi Minh City, a republishing of Mechanics and Crafts of the People of Annam, was done in 2009. The republished version featured the work in three languages, French, English, and Vietnamese. In the first volume of the republished work, there is a section on the history of the manuscript and a list of illustrations with explanations in the three languages. The second and third volumes themselves contain the actual illustrations with Vietnamese captions in the Vietnamese alphabet and the former writing script of Vietnamese, chữ Nôm.

== Description ==
The original manuscript contained two volumes, the first volume being a compilation of more than 4,200 drawings in a 700 page album. The second volume was around 160 pages. The second contains a volume titled, "Introduction générale à l’étude des techniques annamites. Essai sur la vie matérielle, les arts et industries du peuple d’Annam" (General introduction to the study of Annamite techniques. Essay on the material life, arts and industries of the Annamese people), which was a short introduction that talked about the techniques and culture of the Annamese (Vietnamese). The original manuscript included writing in Literary Chinese, Vietnamese (written in chữ Nôm), and French. Depictions were typically described in Vietnamese, written in chữ Nôm. While page numbers were written in Literary Chinese and Arabic numerals.

The content of the manuscript shows and illustrates the culture and living conditions of the Vietnamese people in Tonkin. The illustrations range from production and manufacturing of domestic goods to cultural traditions and beliefs. These traditions also include folk games and contemporary celebrations.

Examples of subjects that were illustrated:

- Selling and buying of goods ("Selling of chopsticks"; Bán đũa, 𧸝𥮊)
- Cultural celebrations ("ritual sharing of the bridal cup of wine on the wedding night"; Lễ hợp cẩn, 禮合𢀷)
- Folk games ("Cockfighting" (Note: Not actually cockfighting, but a children's game where a type of grass plant is used to "cockfight". The top part of the plant is big and fluffy thus it is called the "chicken"); Chọi cỏ gà, 𩠵𦹵𬷤)
- Everyday sights ("Areca palm trees"; Cây cau, 𣘃槁)
- Daily activities ("Squatting"; Ngồi xổm, 𡎥踮)
- Illegal activities ("Stealing cloth"; Ăn trộm khăn, 咹濫䘜)

The illustrations also accurately depict the clothing that was worn at the time, many people can be seen wearing an áo ngũ thân (5-piece dress) and an áo tứ thân (4-piece dress). Most people are also depicted wearing a traditional Vietnamese turban known as the khăn vấn. People are also depicted as being barefoot.

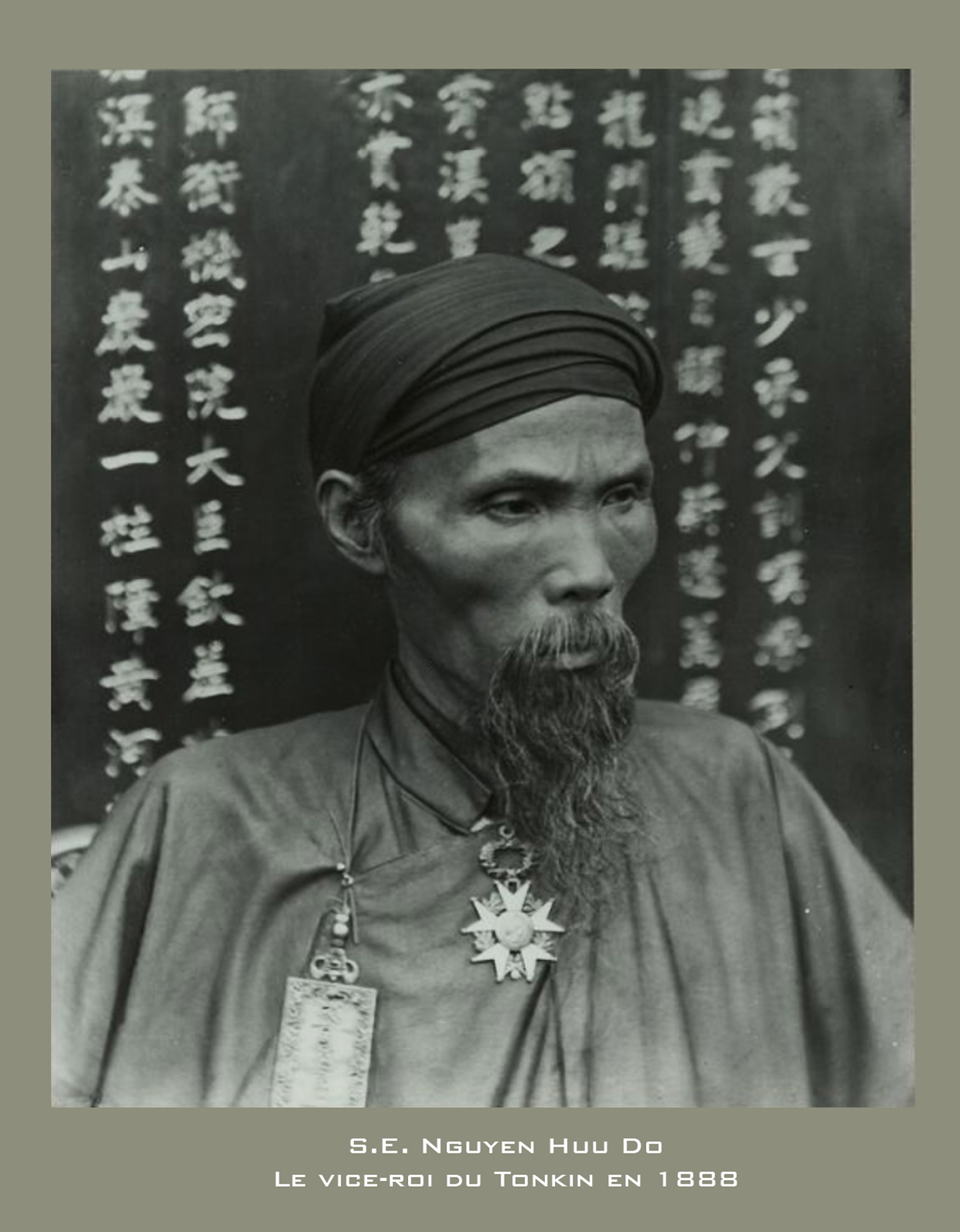
A photograph of a Vietnamese official, Nguyễn Hữu Độ. Hữu Độ is wearing a traditional turban known as a khăn vấn.

Ceremonial dancers of the Nguyễn dynasty is seen here barefooted.

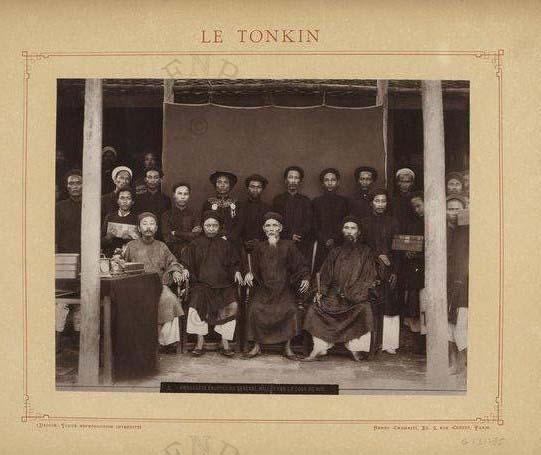
A photograph depict men wearing áo ngũ thân.

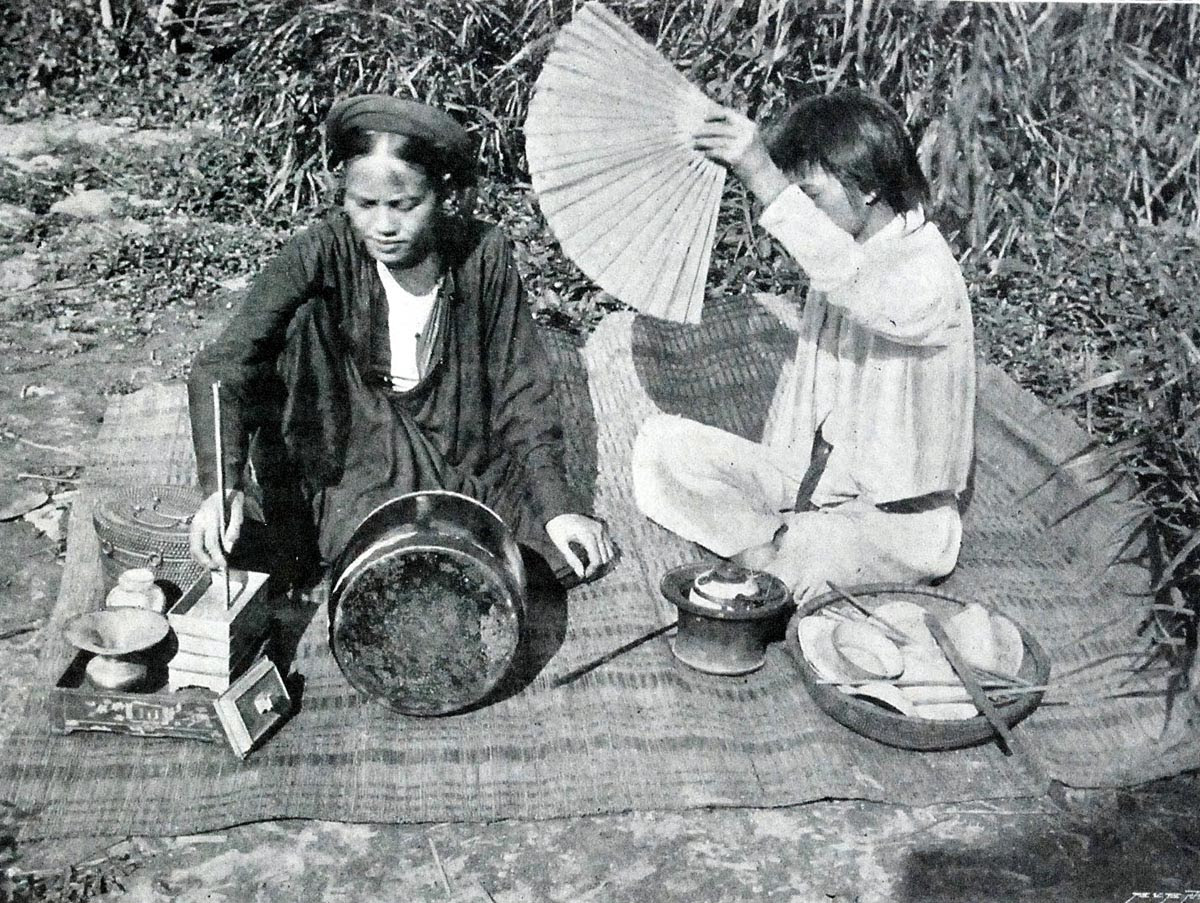
A girl (left) wearing an áo tứ thân.

== Gallery ==
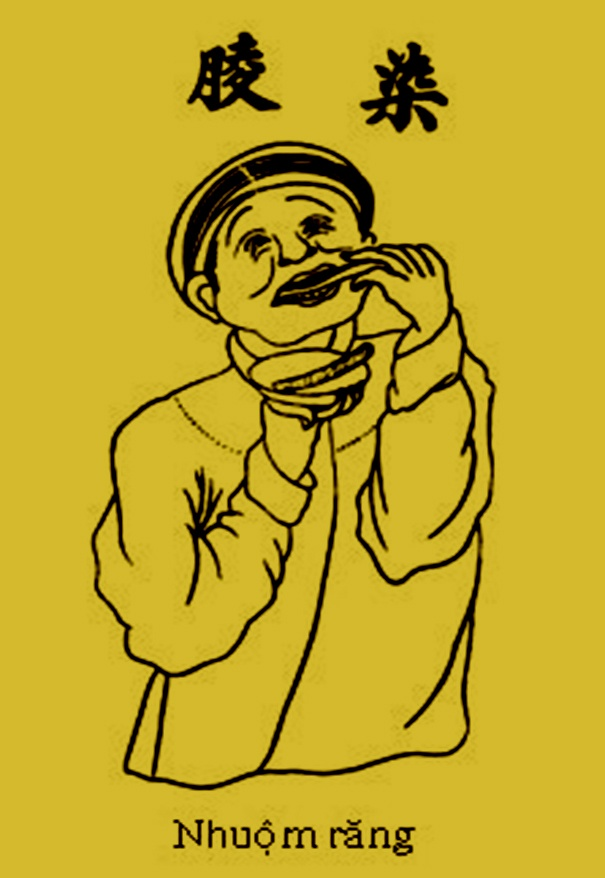
A picture from the manuscript depicting the Vietnamese custom of teeth blackening. (染𦝄 , nhuộm răng)

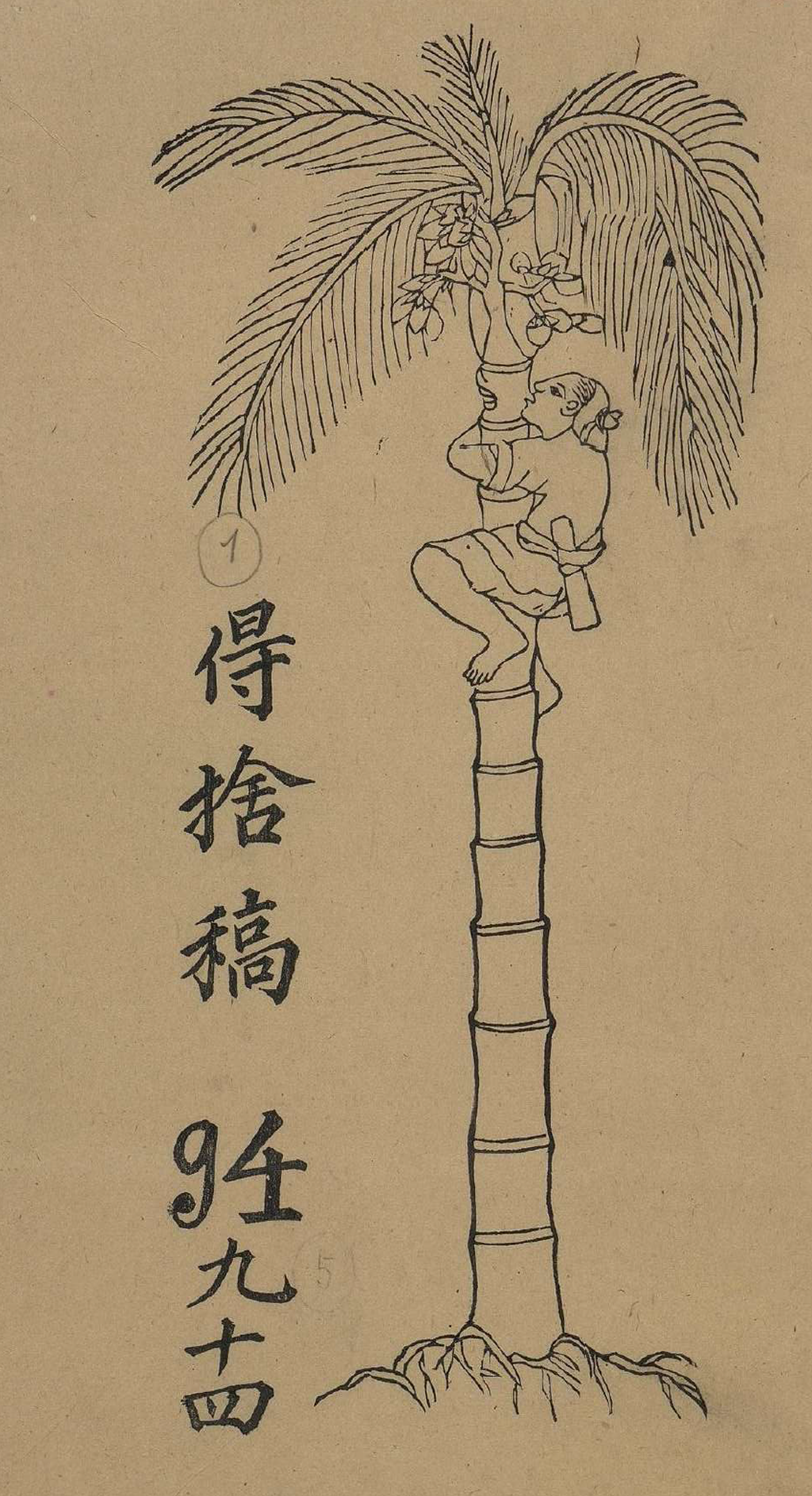
A man climbing an Areca tree to harvest betal nuts. The characters say, "𠊚捨稿 (Note: The artist incorrectly wrote 稿 cảo instead of cau 槁.), Người xá cau".

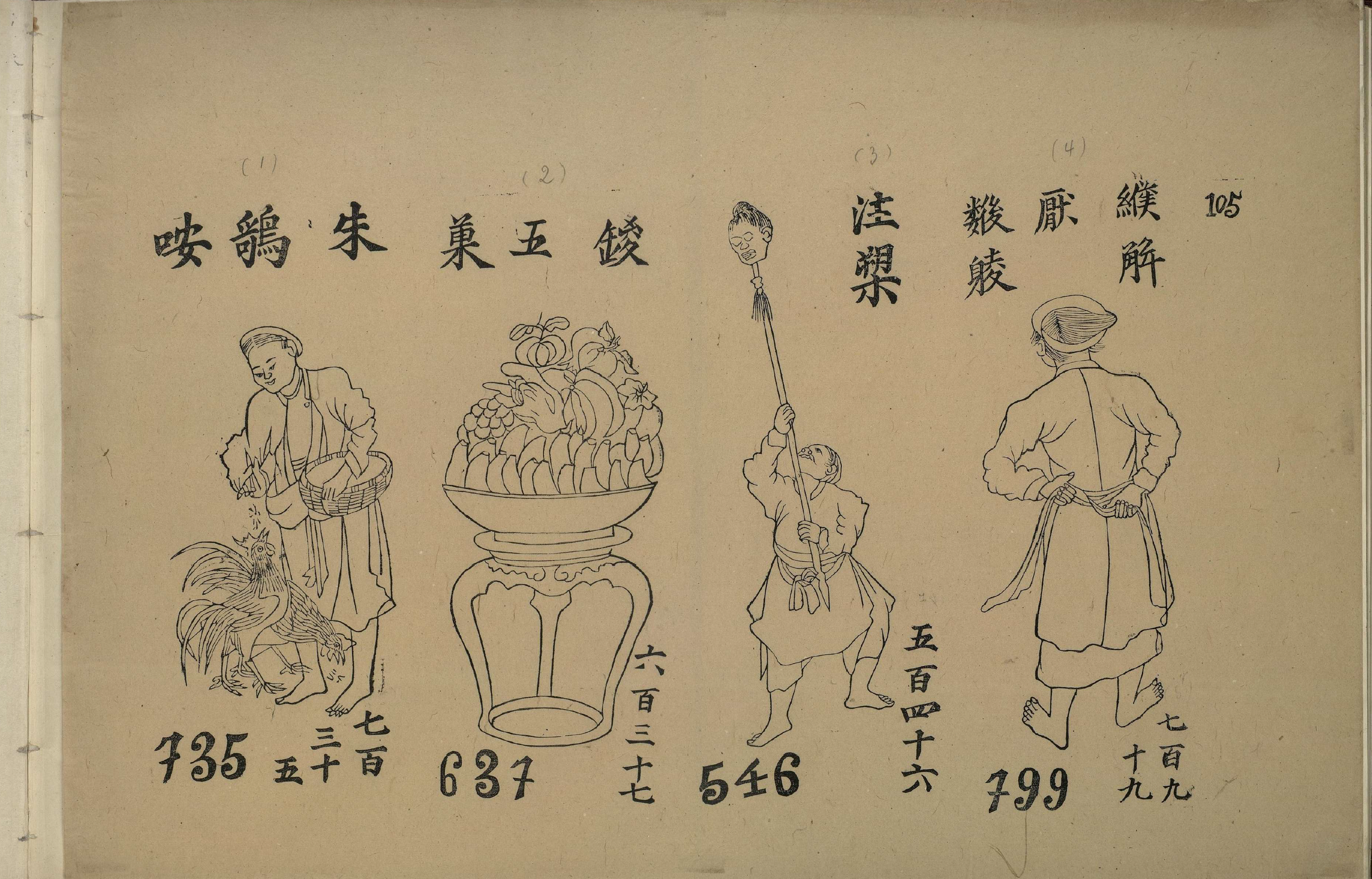
From left to right, let chickens eat (cho gà ăn 朱𬷤咹), fruit bowl offering (mâm ngũ quả 鎫五菓), head on a pole (chú giáo 注槊), tightening of the ribbon and áo yếm behind the back (buộc giải yếm sau lưng 纀解厭𢖖𨉞).

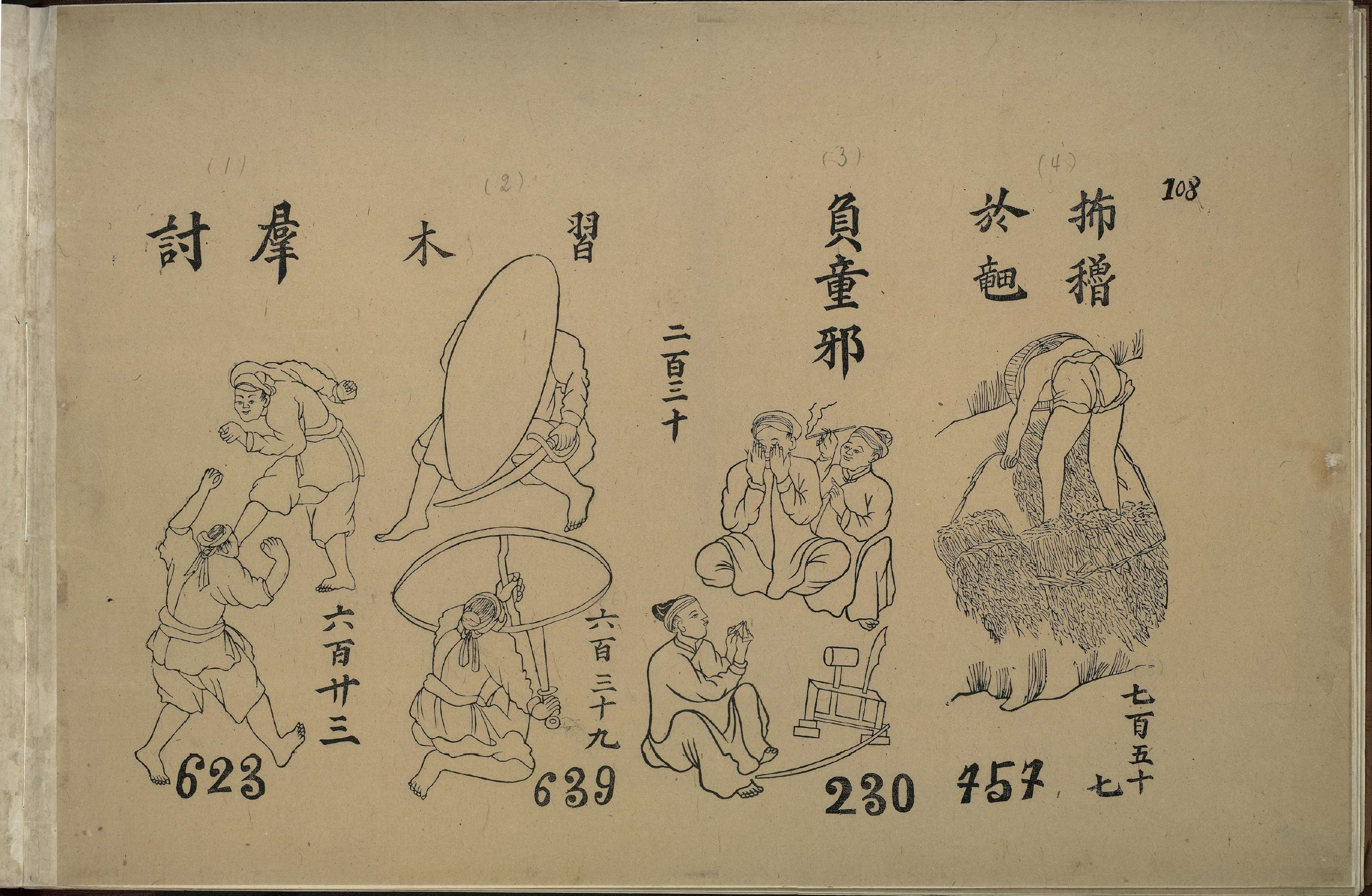
From left to right, mob fighting (quần thảo 羣討), practicing with shields (tập mộc 習木), divination with an evil spirit (phụ đồng tà 負童邪), bunches of rice stalks (bó lúa ở ruộng 抪穭於𪽞).

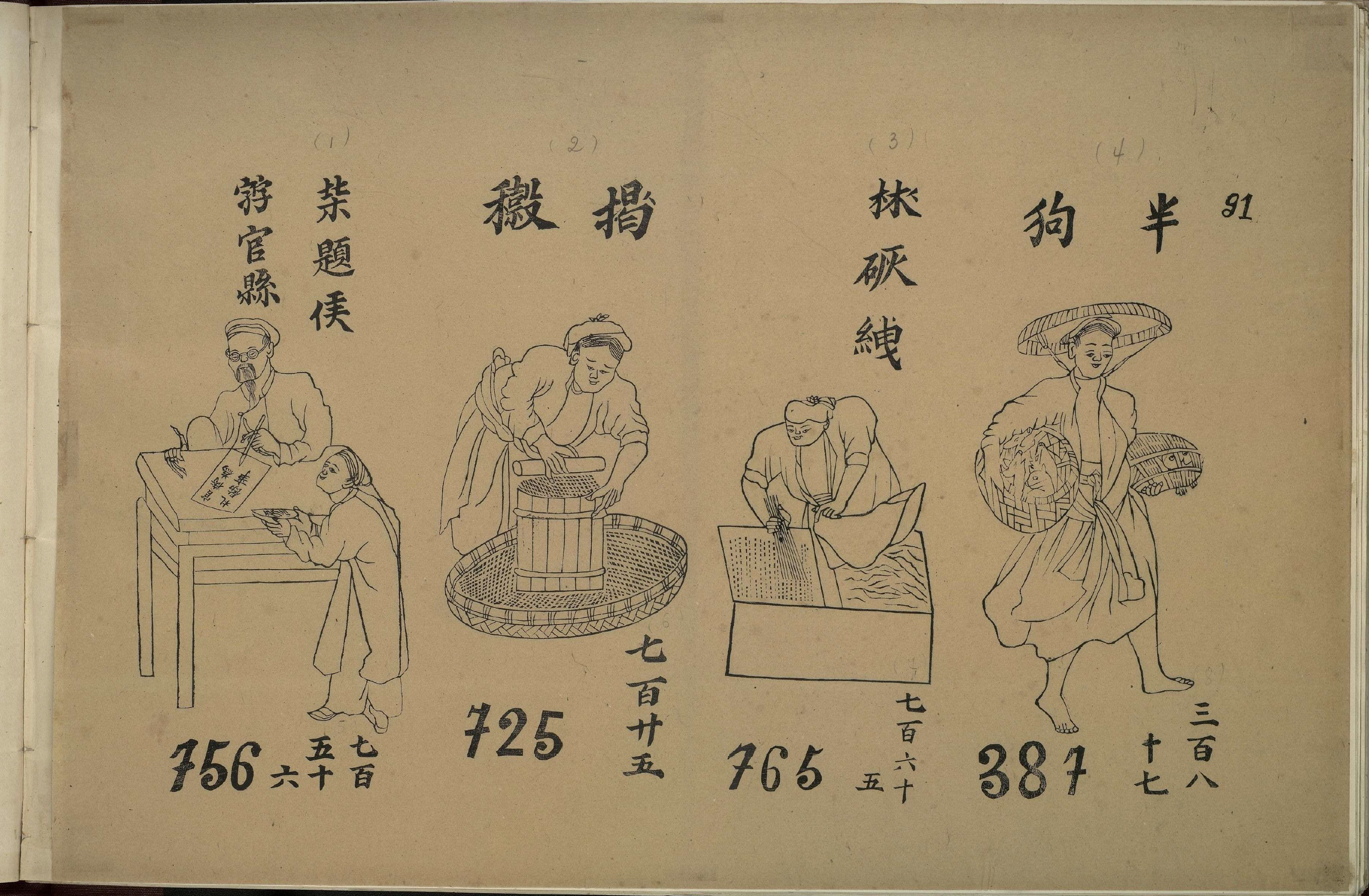
From left to right, Teacher Đề serves the district official (Thầy Đề hầu chữ quan Huyện 柴題侯𡦂官縣), sifting rice stalks (xiết thóc 揭^{𖿱}𭬨), applying lime to paper (chấm vôi giấy 林^{𖿱}𪿙絏), selling dogs (bán cẩu 'chó' 半狗).

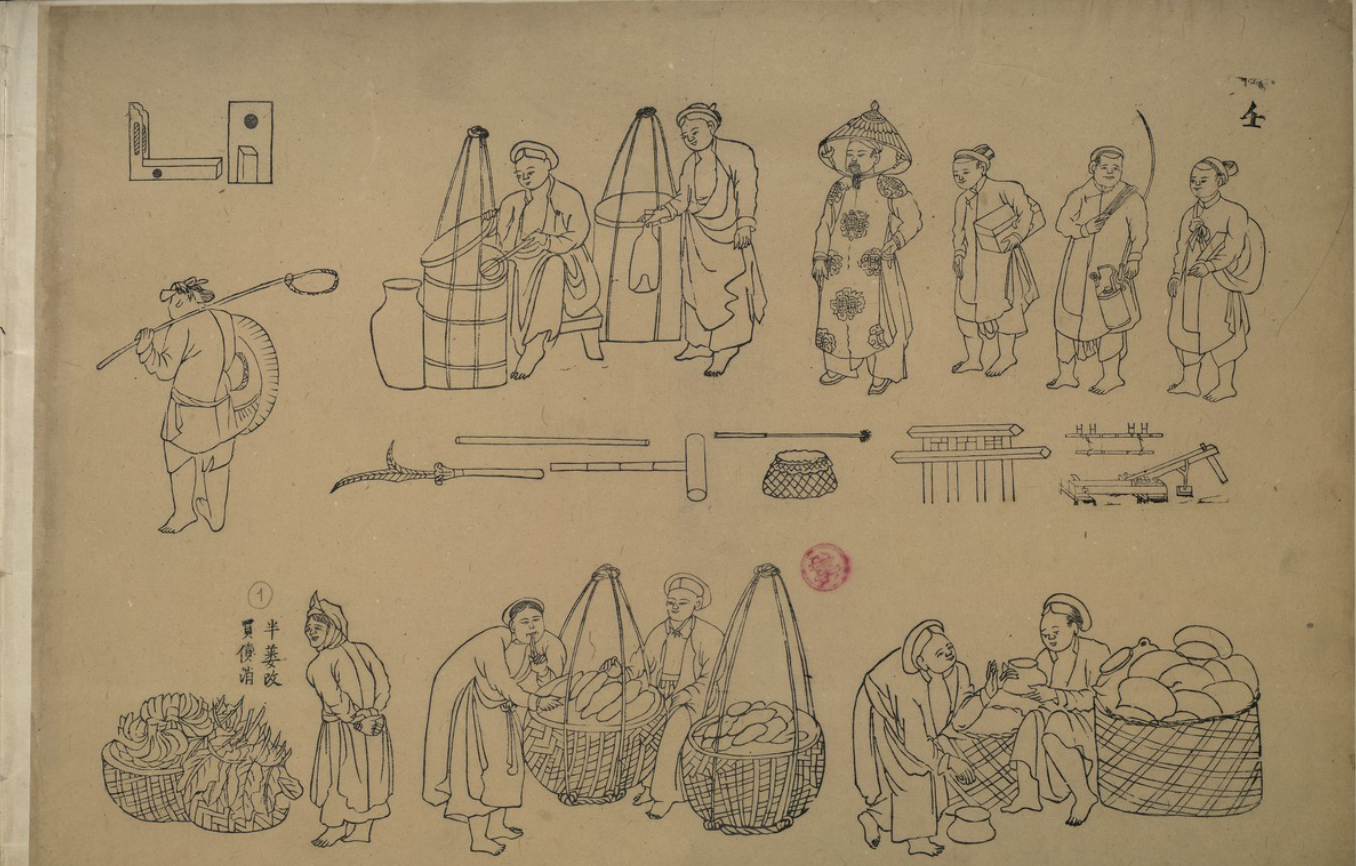
An illustration depicting people selling fruits and bread. It also shows tools used during that time.

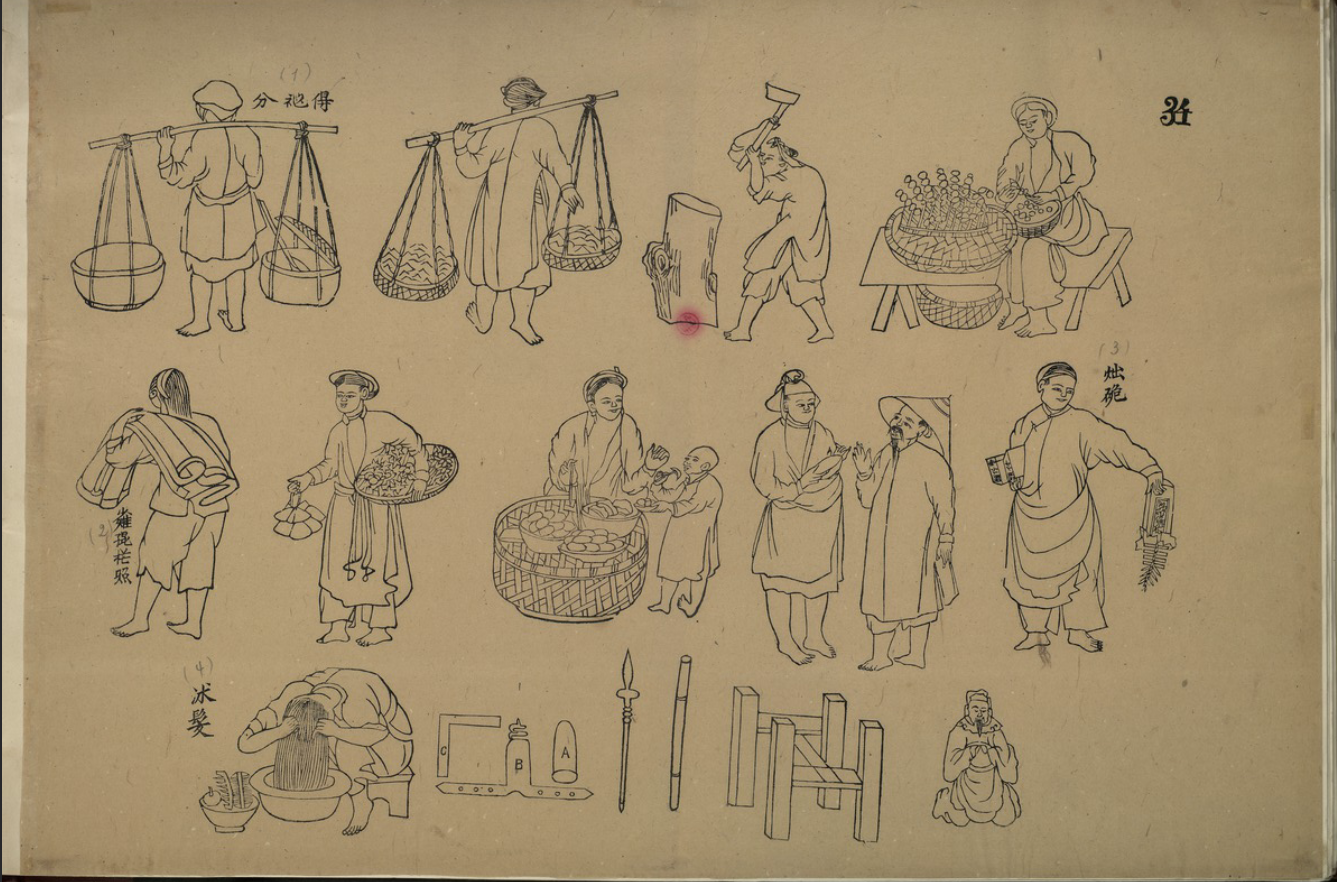
The people of Tonkin shown doing daily activities such as carrying food etc.

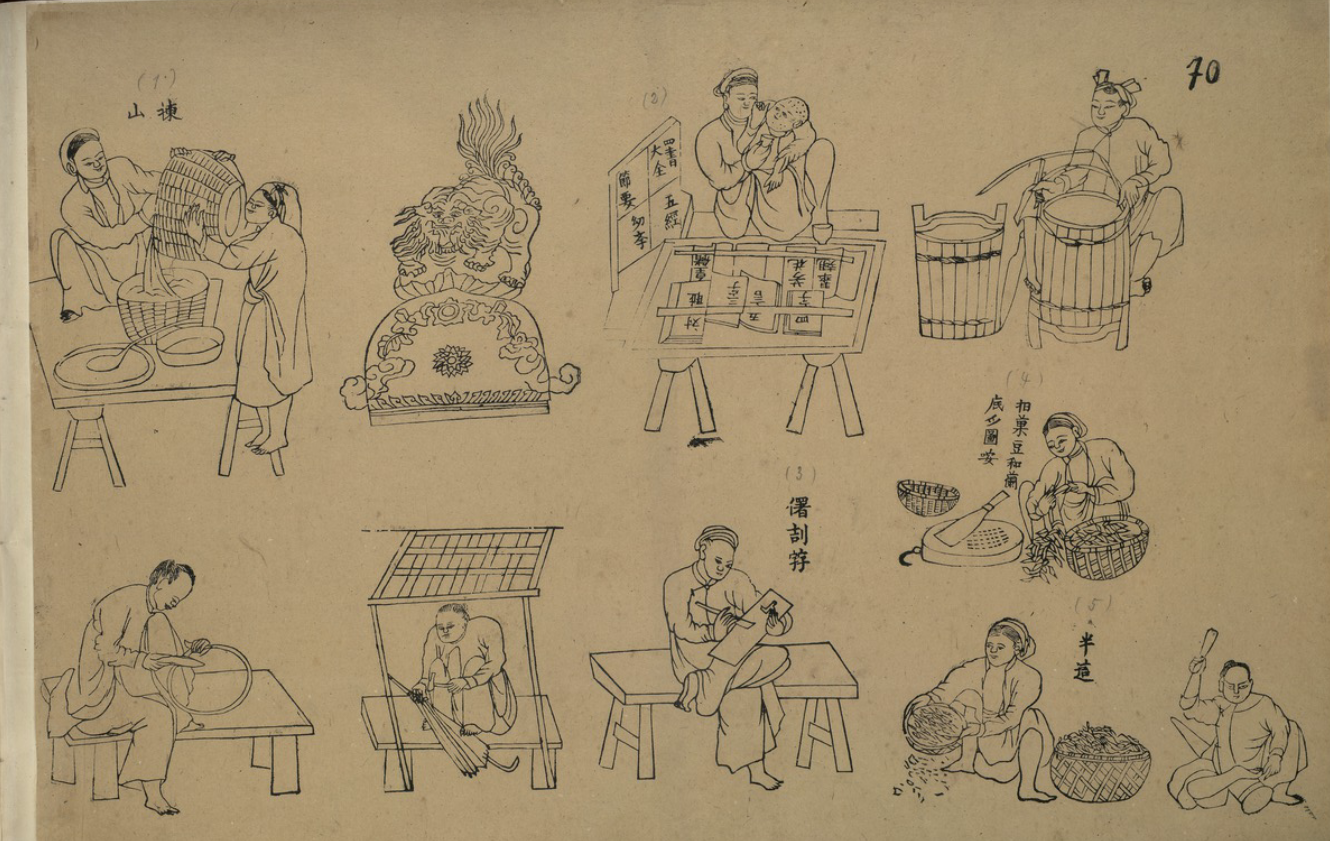
The illustration depicts people sweeping and washing their clothes.

== See also ==
- Vietnamese clothing
- Tonkin (French protectorate)
- Culture of Vietnam
- History of Vietnam
