= Cosao language =

Loloish language spoken in China and Laos

Cosao
- Native to: China, Laos
- Ethnicity: Hani
- Native speakers: 550 (2015)
- Language family: Sino-Tibetan: (Tibeto-Burman); Lolo–Burmese; Loloish; Southern; Siloid; Cosao

Language codes
- ISO 639-3: None (mis)
- Glottolog: cosa1234
- ELP: Cosao

Cosao (autonym: tsʰo55 sɔ55; Chinese: 搓梭) is a Loloish language of China and Laos. The Cosao call themselves tsʰo55 sɔ55, but are referred to by other ethnic groups as the Paijiao people (排角人). They are officially classified by the Chinese government as ethnic Hani people.

== Demographics ==
In China, there are 149 ethnic Cosao people living in the village of Man'gang 曼冈, Mengban Village 勐伴村, Mengban Town 勐伴镇, Mengla County, Yunnan.

In northern Laos, there are 400 ethnic Cosao people in 2 villages in Phongsaly Province, namely Ban Nanli 板南里 (21°45′15″N 102°11′21″E) and Ban Shalue 板沙略 in Boun Tay District 乌德县 (Bai 2015:2-3). Ban Nanli is the older village of the two, since Cosao residents of Ban Shalue report that their ancestors had migrated from Ban Nanli. The two villages are located about 20 kilometers apart from each other.

There are 550 Cosao people total in both China and Laos. In China, Cosao speakers are classified as ethnic Hani.

== Classification ==
Cosao is most closely related to the Khir language of Phongsaly Province, Laos. In turn, Cosao and Khir both belong to the Sila language cluster, which includes Sila, Sida, Phusang, Khir, and Cosao.
