= Akeu language =

Loloish language spoken in China, Myanmar, Laos

Akeu
- Ake
- Native to: China, Myanmar, Laos
- Native speakers: (12,000 cited 1996–2006)
- Language family: Sino-Tibetan: Tibeto-Burman; Lolo–Burmese; Loloish; Southern Loloish; Siloid; Akeu

Language codes
- ISO 639-3: aeu
- Glottolog: akeu1235 Akeu
- ELP: Akeu

Akeu is a Loloish language mainly spoken in Jinghong and Mengla County, China, with smaller populations of speakers in Burma, Laos, and Thailand. Gokhy may be related.

Luma is also closely related to Akeu according to Lew (2023).

== Distribution ==
Akeu (Ake 阿克; autonym: Gouke 勾克) is spoken in the following locations of Yunnan (You 2013:172). The Akeu migrated from Mojiang County to the Xishuangbanna (西双版纳, Sipsongpanna) area 8 generations ago (about 300 years ago).

- Ganlanba 橄榄坝, Menghan Township 勐罕镇, Jinghong City 景洪市;
- Menglong Township 勐龙镇, Jinghong City 景洪市;
- Sanda Mountain 三达山, Jinghong City 景洪市;
- Menglun Township 勐仑镇, Mengla County 勐腊县;
- Yiwu District 易武乡, Mengla County 勐腊县.

== Dialects ==
The Akeu dialects of Kyaingtong, Myanmar and Menglun 勐仑镇, Mengla County, China are similar. The following words from these two Akeu dialects are from Hayashi (2015).

Gloss	Kyaingtong Akeu	Menglun Akeu
tea	lɔ⁵⁵bo²¹	lɔ⁵⁵bɔ²¹
pig	wa̱²¹	wa̱²¹
bird	kɛ²¹a²¹	kja̱²¹
salt	tsa̱²¹dɤ̱²¹	tsa̱²¹dɤ̱²¹
buffalo	u³³na⁵⁵	mo²¹na³³
four	li²¹	li²¹
to fly	bɛ³³	bɛ³³

== Vocabulary ==
The Akeu numerals are:

1. tɯʔ˨
2. ɲ̩ʔ˨
3. hɛ˦
4. li˨
5. ŋa˨
6. koʔ˨
7. siʔ˨
8. eʔ˨
9. ɡy˨
10. tsʰə˦
