= Phạm Hồng Điệp =

Vietnamese author, lawyer, and former soldier

Phạm Hồng Điệp is a Vietnamese author, lawyer, and former soldier. He is the founder and chairman of SHINEC Joint Stock Company, which developed the Nam Cau Kien Industrial Park in Hải Phòng.

== Education ==
Điệp served in the Vietnamese Border Guard and later worked at the Hải Phòng Military School before leaving military service. After leaving the military, he studied in the Faculty of Economics at Foreign Trade University and later worked for the ship-material import-export company Visdemco.

== Career ==
Điệp has led and participated in applied research on circular economy and eco-industrial development. The research project "Developing Nam Cau Kien into an eco-industrial park based on a circular-economy model" was included in the Vietnam Innovation Golden Book 2023. He published Kinh tế tuần hoàn – Định dạng và phát triển bền vững ở khu công nghiệp sinh thái Nam Cầu Kiền (The Circular Economy – Sustainable Development Format in Nam Cau Kien Eco-industrial Park), listed in the National Library of Vietnam's national bibliography. He was one of the co-chief editors of Phát triển khu công nghiệp sinh thái: Kiến tạo tương lai xanh cho Việt Nam (Developing Eco-industrial Parks: Creating a Green Future for Vietnam), published by the National Political Publishing House.

Điệp published Khúc lãng du Cụ Mén (The Wandering Ballad of Cụ Mén), a sequence of 100 poems centred on an elderly Vietnamese farmer. This has described the work as a fragmented epic or verse narrative in which rural labour, folk humour, memory and social change are connected through the recurring character of Cụ Mén. He published Cuộc phiêu du của Chép Hồng (The Adventures of the Red Carp), a children's literary work built around an aquatic journey. Nhân Dân discussed the book as ecological children's literature, noting themes of nature, adaptation and environmental responsibility.

== Selected publications ==
- Kinh tế tuần hoàn – Định dạng và phát triển bền vững ở khu công nghiệp sinh thái Nam Cầu Kiền, with Đặng Việt Bách, Tri Thức Publishing House, 2023.
- Phát triển khu công nghiệp sinh thái: Kiến tạo tương lai xanh cho Việt Nam, co-chief editor, National Political Publishing House, 2025.
- Khúc lãng du Cụ Mén (The Wandering Ballad of Cụ Mén), 2026.
- Cuộc phiêu du của Chép Hồng (The Adventures of the Red Carp), 2026.
