= Siloid languages =

Language family in Southeast Asia

Siloid
- Geographic distribution: Northern Laos and Indochina
- Ethnicity: Si La people
- Linguistic classification: Sino-Tibetan: (Tibeto-Burman); Lolo–Burmese; Loloish; Southern; Siloid
- Subdivisions: Sila; Khir; Cosao; Paza; Phana’; Wanyä; Akeu; Gokhy

Language codes
- Glottolog: sila1251

The Siloid languages belong to the Southern Loloish (Hanoish) branch of the Sino-Tibetan language family. The Siloid branch was first proposed by Hsiu (2016).

Most Siloid languages are spoken in Phongsaly Province, northern Laos, with smaller numbers of speakers living in China (Yunnan) and Vietnam (Lai Châu Province).

== Languages ==
The Siloid languages are:

- Sila
- Khir
- Cosao
- Paza
- Phana’
- Wanyä
- Akeu
- Gokhy

Luma is also closely related to Akeu according to Lew (2023).

== Classification ==
The internal classifications of Siloid languages were analyzed in a 2016 computational phylogenetic lexical analysis by Hsiu (2016).

Siloid

- Wanyä
- (core branch)
  - Phusang
  - Khir, Cosao
  - Sila (Sida)

The Siloid classification above was subsequently revised by Hsiu (2018) as follows.

Siloid

- Luma, Pala
- Akeu, Gokhy
- Wanyä (Muchi)
- Sila cluster:
  - Sila, Sida
  - Paza (Phusang)
  - Khir, Cosao
  - Phana
