= List of libraries in Vietnam =

This is a list of libraries in Vietnam.

== National library ==
- National Library of Vietnam

== Public libraries ==
Public libraries in Vietnam are governed by the 2019 Law on Libraries (46/2019/QH14). Following the 2025 Vietnamese administrative reforms, provinces subject to reorganization reviewed existing provincial public libraries to select one as the new primary provincial library, retaining others as branches or satellite facilities. District-level public libraries were transferred to commune-level management. The names listed below reflect names prior to these reforms.

=== An Giang ===
- An Giang Provincial Library
- Kien Giang Provincial Library

=== Bắc Ninh ===
- Bac Giang Provincial Library
- Bac Ninh Provincial Library

=== Cà Mau ===
- Bac Lieu Provincial Library
- Ca Mau Provincial Library

=== Cần Thơ (Centrally-governed city) ===
- Can Tho City Library
- Hau Giang Provincial Library
- Soc Trang Provincial Library

=== Cao Bằng ===
- Cao Bang Provincial Library

=== Đà Nẵng (Centrally governed city) ===
- Da Nang General Science Library
- Quang Nam Provincial Library

=== Đắk Lắk ===
- Dak Lak Provincial Library
- Phu Yen Provincial Library

=== Điện Biên ===
- Dien Bien Provincial Library

=== Đồng Nai (Centrally-governed city) ===
- Binh Phuoc Provincial Library
- Dong Nai Provinical LIbrary

=== Đồng Tháp ===
- Dong Thap Provincial Library
- Tien Giang Provincial LIbrary

=== Gia Lai ===
- Binh Dinh Provincial Library
- Gia Lai Provincial Library

=== Hà Tĩnh ===
- Ha Tinh Provincial Library

=== Hải Phòng (Centrally-governed city) ===
- Hai Duong Provincial Library
- Hai Phong City Library

=== Hà Nội (Centrally-governed city) ===
- Hanoi Cultural and Library Center

=== Ho Chi Minh City (Centrally-governed city) ===
- Ba Ria - Vung Tau Provincial Library
- Binh Duong Provincial Library
- General Sciences Library of Ho Chi Minh City

=== Huế (Centrally-governed city) ===
- Thua Thien Hue Provincial Library

=== Hưng Yên ===
- Hung Yen Provincial Library
- Thai Binh Provincial Library

=== Khánh Hòa ===
- Khanh Hoa Provincial Library
- Ninh Thuan Provincial Library

=== Lai Châu ===
- Lai Chau Provincial Library

=== Lâm Đồng ===
- Binh Thuan Provincial Library
- Dak Nong Provincial Library
- Lam Dong Provincial Library

=== Lạng Sơn ===
- Lang Son Provincial Library

=== Lào Cai ===
- Lao Cai Provincial Library
- Yen Bai Provincial Library

=== Nghệ An ===
- Nghe An Provincial Library

=== Ninh Bình ===
- Ha Nam Provincial Library
- Nam Dinh Provincial Library
- Ninh Binh Provincial Library

=== Phú Thọ ===
- Hoa Binh Provincial Library
- Phu Tho Provincial Library
- Vinh Phuc Provincial Library

=== Quảng Ngãi ===
- Kon Tum Provincial Library
- Quang Ngai Provincial Library

=== Quảng Ninh (Centrally-governed city) ===
- Quang Ninh Provincial Library

=== Quảng Trị ===
- Quang Binh Provincial Library
- Quang Tri Provincial Library

=== Sơn La ===
- Son La Provincial Library

=== Tây Ninh ===
- Long An Museum and Library
- Tay Ninh Provincial Library

=== Thái Nguyên ===
- Bac Kan Provincial Library
- Thai Nguyen Provincial Library

=== Thanh Hóa ===
- Thanh Hoa Provincial Library

=== Tuyên Quang ===
- Ha Giang Provincial Library
- Tuyen Quang Provincial Library

=== Vĩnh Long ===
- Ben Tre Provincial Library
- Tra Vinh Provincial Library
- Vinh Long Provincial Library

== Academic and university libraries ==
=== Ho Chi Minh City ===
- Ba Ria - Vung Tau University Library
- Binh Duong University Library
- Ho Chi Minh City Open University Library
- Ho Chi Minh City University of Agriculture and Forestry Library
- Ho Chi Minh City University of Architecture Library
- Ho Chi Minh City University of Culture Library
- Ho Chi Minh City University of Education Library
- Ho Chi Minh City University of Fine Arts Library
- Ho Chi Minh City University of Industry Library
- Ho Chi Minh City University of Law Library
- Ho Chi Minh City University of Technology and Education Library
- Nguyen Tat Thanh University Library
- Pham Ngoc Thach University of Medicine Library
- Saigon Technology University Library
- Saigon University Library
- University of Banking, Ho Chi Minh City Library
- University of Economics Ho Chi Minh City Library
- University of Finance and Marketing Library
- University of Foreign Languages and Information Technology, Ho Chi Minh City, Library
- University of Medicine and Pharmacy of Ho Chi Minh City Library
- University of Social Sciences and Humanities Library, Vietnam National University
- Van Hien University Library
- Van Lang University Library

=== Hà Nội ===
- Diplomatic Academy Library
- Foreign Trade University Library
- Hanoi Medical University Library
- Hanoi University Library
- Hanoi University of Pharmacy Library
- University of Civil Engineering Library

=== Elsewhere ===
- An Giang University Library
- Can Tho University Library
- Dalat University Library
- Da Nang University of Economics Library
- Dong Nai University Library
- Dong Nai University of Technology Library
- Dong Thap University Library
- Duy Tan University Library
- Nam Can Tho University Library
- Nha Trang University Library
- Pham Van Dong University Libraryi
- Phu Yen University Library
- Quang Nam University Library
- Tay Nguyen University Library
- Tra Vinh University Library

== Special and research libraries ==
- General Lê Đức Anh Library
- Institute of Hán-Nôm Studies library

== International and cultural center libraries ==
- American Center Hanoi library

== See also ==
- Library associations in Vietnam
- Mass media in Vietnam
- State Archives and Records Administration (Vietnam) (in Vietnamese)
- Vietnamese literature
