= American Center Hanoi =

The American Center Hanoi is an educational center. Hanoi’s USIS Library was established in 1997. On October 1, 1999, USIS Hanoi changed its name to the Public Affairs Section, U.S. Embassy and the Library became the IRC, located at 127 Ba Trieu Street, Hanoi. At that time, it were only open to PAS key contacts. In 2000, the IRC moved to 170 Ngoc Khanh, Hanoi. In 2004, we started accepting senior students to the IRC and from April 2008, it became totally open to the public. The IRC is open until 6:00pm every weekday. It closes on Monday mornings and American and Vietnamese holidays. The new name as of 2010 is the American Center Hanoi.

The AC is equipped with books, magazines, on-line databases, and other materials. Its staff of four can provide information about American people and culture, history and society, government and politics, economics and trade, foreign affairs and defense, literature and performing arts, and education and language. The AC also has information on issues of global concern, such as narcotics trafficking, protection of the environment, and terrorism.

The AC is open to the general public free of charge and welcomes visits by government officials, academics, journalists, students, and others interested in information about the United States.

In 2014, the American Center was planned to undergo a substantial renovation in the coming months to transform the AC into a 21st-century information resource center in a timely manner.

== See also ==
- List of libraries in Vietnam
