= Phanaʼ language =

Loloish language spoken in China and Laos

Phanaʼ
- Bana, Pana
- Native to: Laos, China
- Native speakers: (350 cited 1995 census)
- Language family: Sino-Tibetan: Tibeto-Burman; Lolo–Burmese; Loloish; Southern; Siloid; Phanaʼ

Language codes
- ISO 639-3: phq
- Glottolog: phan1254
- ELP: Phana'

Phanaʼ (autonym: pa55 na33); also called Bana or Pana) is a Loloish language of Laos and China. Phanaʼ is spoken by 500 people in Laos. In China, it is spoken in Mengla County, Yunnan Province (Bradley 2007). It is closely related to Sila, which is spoken by 2,000 people in Laos and Vietnam (Bradley 1997). Badenoch reports that it is similar to vɛ33 ɲɯ33 (Ban Ban Sida).

Phanaʼ is spoken in three villages in Laos (Ethnologue).

- Bopiet, Luang Namtha District, Luang Namtha Province
- Namtoung, Luang Namtha District, Luang Namtha Province
- one village in Houaixay District, Bokeo Province

Bradley (2007) reports a population of about 1,000 for Phanaʼ.

Lefèvre-Pontalis (1892) reports the presence of Phanaʼ in Poufang, Lai Chau province, Vietnam, and provides a word list for Phanaʼ as well.

== Numerals ==
Phanaʼ (Bana) numerals are as follows.

1. tʰɯ21
2. ŋɛ21
3. sy55
4. li21
5. ŋɔ21
6. kʰʲõ21
7. ɕĩ21
8. ɛ̃21
9. kø21
10. tsʰɤ55
