= General Lê Đức Anh Library =

- Thư viện Đại Tướng Lê Đức Anh
- Location: Phú Lộc District, Huế, Vietnam
- Type: Public library
- Established: 7 April 2012

Collection
- Items collected: Books, photographs, memorabilia
- Size: Approximately 4,000 books

Access and use
- Population served: Local residents, students, visitors

Other information
- Website: thuvienleducanh.vn

The General Lê Đức Anh Library (Vietnamese: Thư viện Đại Tướng Lê Đức Anh) is a public library and cultural center located in Phú Lộc District, Huế, Vietnam. Named after Lê Đức Anh, a Vietnamese general and former President of Vietnam (1992–1997), the library serves as a memorial to his life and revolutionary contributions. It is part of the larger Nhà Văn hóa và Thư viện Đại tướng Lê Đức Anh complex, which includes memorial spaces, gardens, and facilities for community activities.

== History ==
The library was constructed adjacent to the birthplace and parental home of General Lê Đức Anh in his hometown. Building began in 2011 and was completed in 2012, covering an area of approximately 4,000 square meters. It was officially inaugurated on 7 April 2012. Following General Lê Đức Anh's death on 22 April 2019, the facility underwent urgent renovations, including painting, garden maintenance, and interior cleaning, to prepare for visitors during the mourning period. Further upgrades were completed in 2020 to enhance the site's infrastructure. The site has hosted notable visitors, including Chairman of the National Assembly Trần Thanh Mẫn in December 2024, who paid tribute to the general.

== See also ==
- List of libraries in Vietnam
