= Teeth blackening =

Custom of dyeing one's teeth black

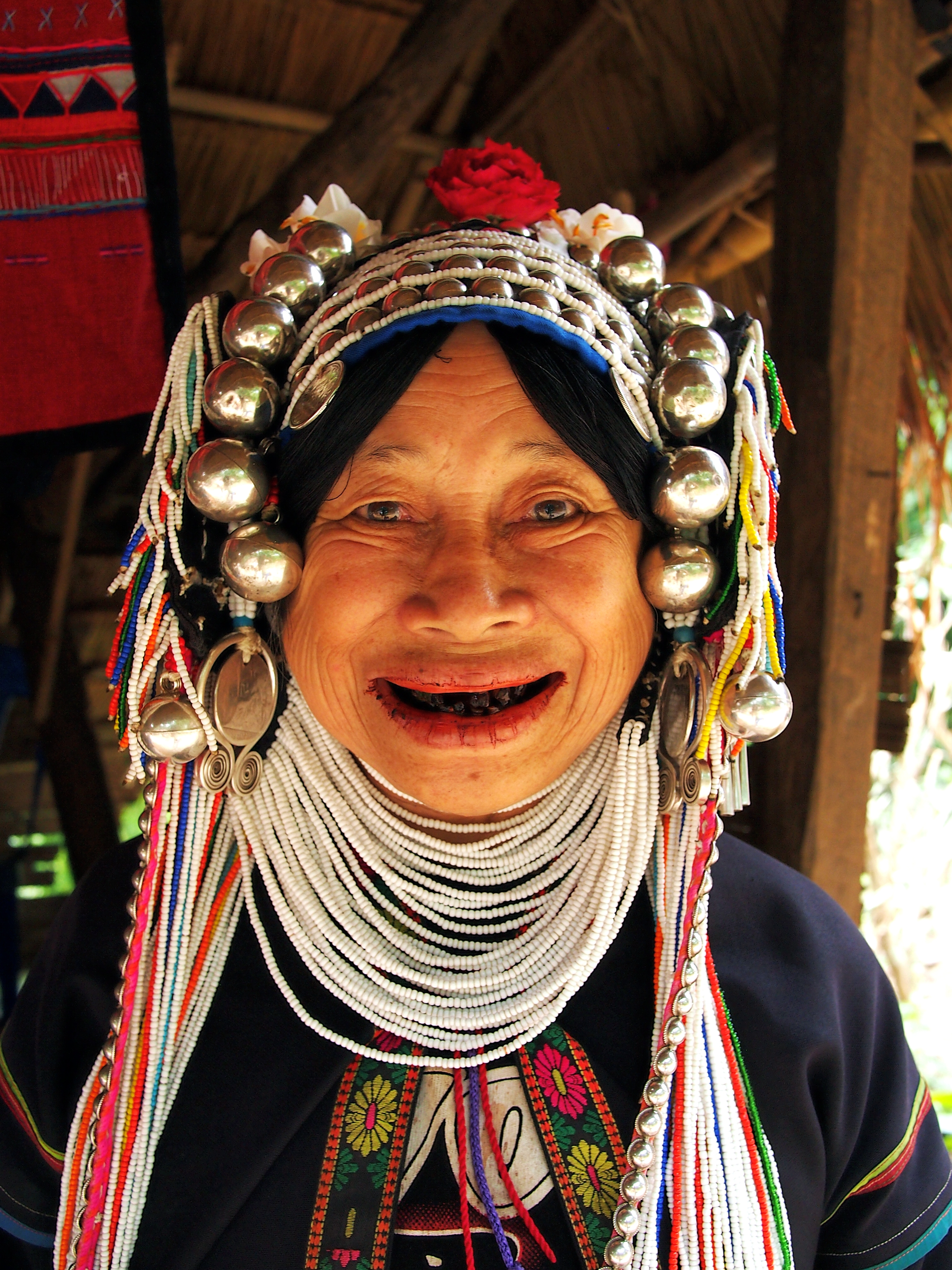
An Akha woman from Myanmar with blackened teeth

Teeth blackening or teeth lacquering is a custom of dyeing one's teeth black. It was most predominantly practiced in Southeast Asian and Oceanic cultures, particularly among Austronesian, Austroasiatic, and Kra–Dai-speaking peoples. It was also practiced in Japan prior to the Meiji era, as well as in India.

Teeth blackening is usually done during puberty, signalling a transition into adulthood. It was seen as a sign of maturity, beauty, and civilization. A common belief is that blackened teeth differentiated humans from animals. Teeth blackening is often done in conjunction with traditions of tooth sharpening and dental evulsion, as well as other body modification customs like tattoos. Teeth blackening and filing were regarded with fascination and disapproval by early European explorers and colonists.

The practice survives in some isolated ethnic groups in Southeast Asia and Oceania but has mostly disappeared after the introduction of Western beauty standards during the colonial era. It is mainly prevalent in older women, though the practice is still carried on by some younger women. Sometimes artificial teeth are used to achieve blackened teeth.

Teeth blackening is commonly confused with the red-stained teeth from betel chewing. However, betel chewing damages the teeth and gums, while teeth blackening does not.

== East and Southeast Asia ==
=== Japan ===
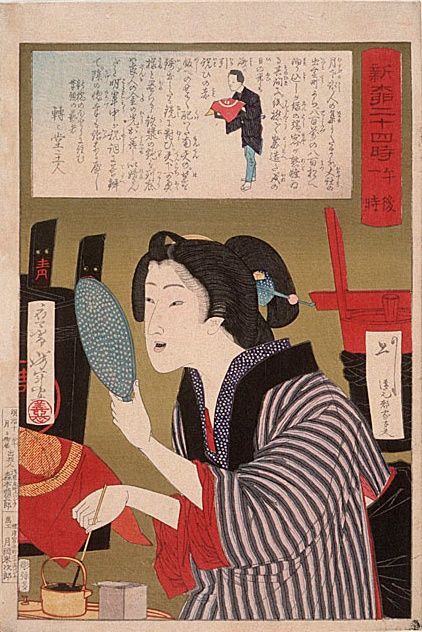
Ukiyo-e by Tsukioka Yoshitoshi, 'Twenty-Four Hours at Shinbashi and Yanagibashi', print 13, showing a woman applying ohaguro

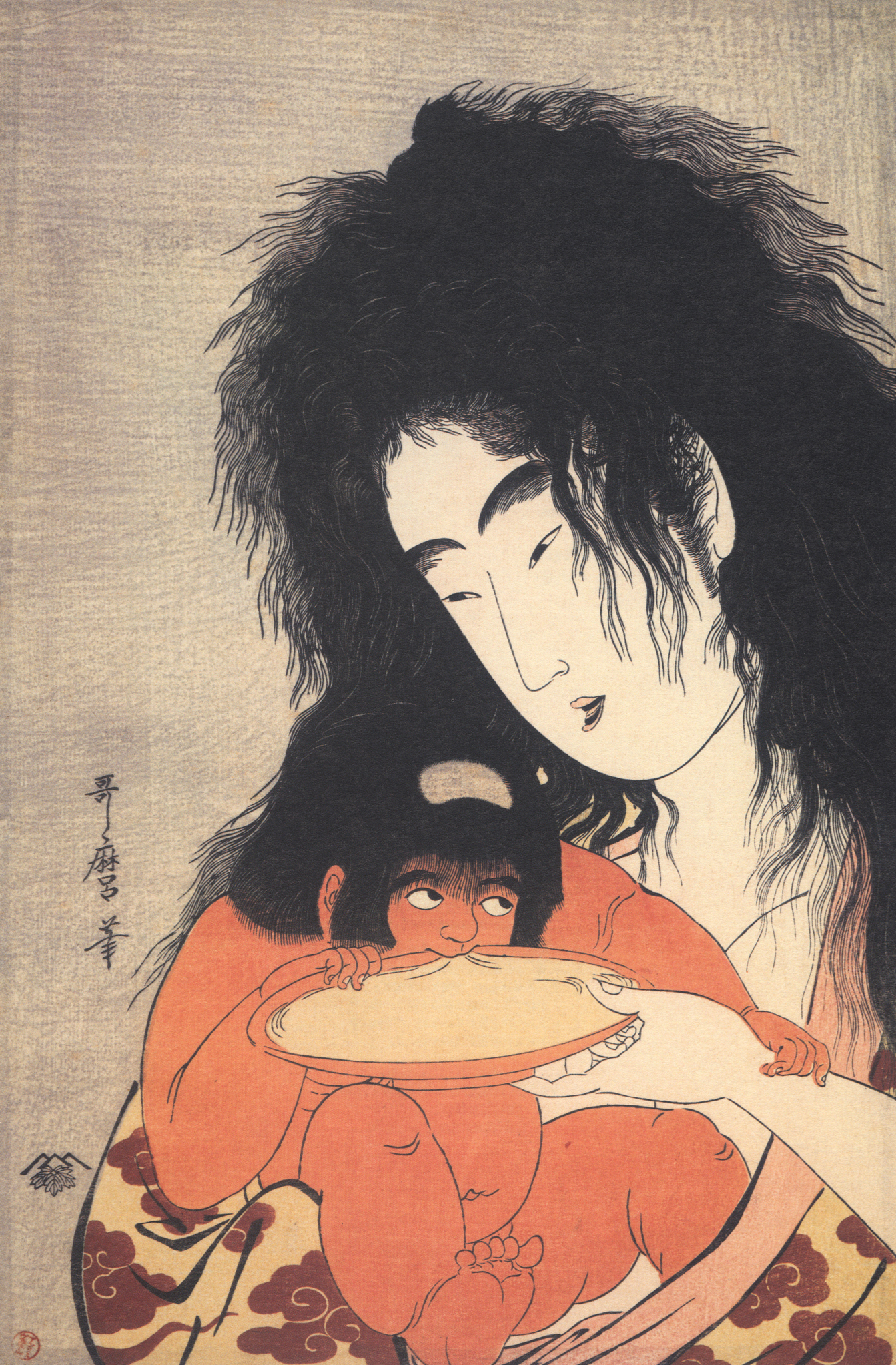
Ukiyo-e of yama-uba with blackened teeth

In Japan, teeth blackening is known as ohaguro (お歯黒). Ohaguro existed in one form or another for hundreds of years, and was seen amongst the population as beautiful until the end of the Meiji period (1868–1911). Objects that were pitch black, such as glaze-like lacquer, were seen as beautiful.

==== Name ====
The word ohaguro was an aristocratic term. There is an alternate term for ohaguro, kane (鉄漿, lit. 'iron drink'). At the old Imperial palace in Kyoto, it was called fushimizu (五倍子水). Among civilians, such words as kanetsuke (鉄漿付け), tsukegane (つけがね) and hagurome (歯黒め) were used.

==== History ====
Traces of blackened teeth can be seen in the buried bones and haniwa of the Kofun period (300–538 CE). References to ohaguro exist in The Tale of Genji and Tsutsumi Chūnagon Monogatari. At the end of the Heian period, at the time when aristocratic men and women reached puberty and celebrated their genpuku or mogi, the Taira clan and other samurai, and pages working at large temples, dyed their teeth using kanemizu, a solution made from ferric acetate, created from soaking iron filings in vinegar, and tannins, derived from vegetables or tea. The Imperial family and other high-ranking aristocrats who had finished their hakamaza (ceremony where a child is fitted with a hakama) blackened their teeth and painted their eyebrows (hikimayu (引眉)). This was done in the Imperial household until the end of the Edo era.

In the Muromachi period (1336–1573), ohaguro was generally seen among adults, though when the Sengoku period (1467–1615) began, so as to prepare for political marriages of convenience, when the daughters of military commanders were around 8 to 10 years old, they would blacken their teeth as a marking of their coming of age. Relatives and guardians of the bride who blackened their teeth were called kaneoya (鉄漿親). It is said that military commanders who were struck in the head on the battlefield and who did not want to be ugly would wear average women's makeup and would blacken their teeth. These faces imitated the Noh masks of women and young boys.

After the Edo period (1603–1867), only men of the Imperial House of Japan and the aristocracy blackened their teeth. Due to the odor and labor required for the process, as well as a feeling among young women that they were ageing, ohaguro was done only by married women, unmarried women who were older than 18, sex workers and geisha. For rural people, ohaguro was done only at times of special celebrations, such as Japanese festivals, wedding ceremonies, and funerals. There were also depictions of ohaguro in fairy tales, such as "Gon, the Little Fox".

On February 5, 1870, the government banned ohaguro and the process gradually became obsolete. After the Meiji period, it temporarily spread, but it almost entirely died out in the Taishō period (1912–1926).

In contemporary times, the only places where ohaguro can be seen is in plays, on some older apprentice geisha, some festivals, and movies.

=== Vietnam ===
==== History ====
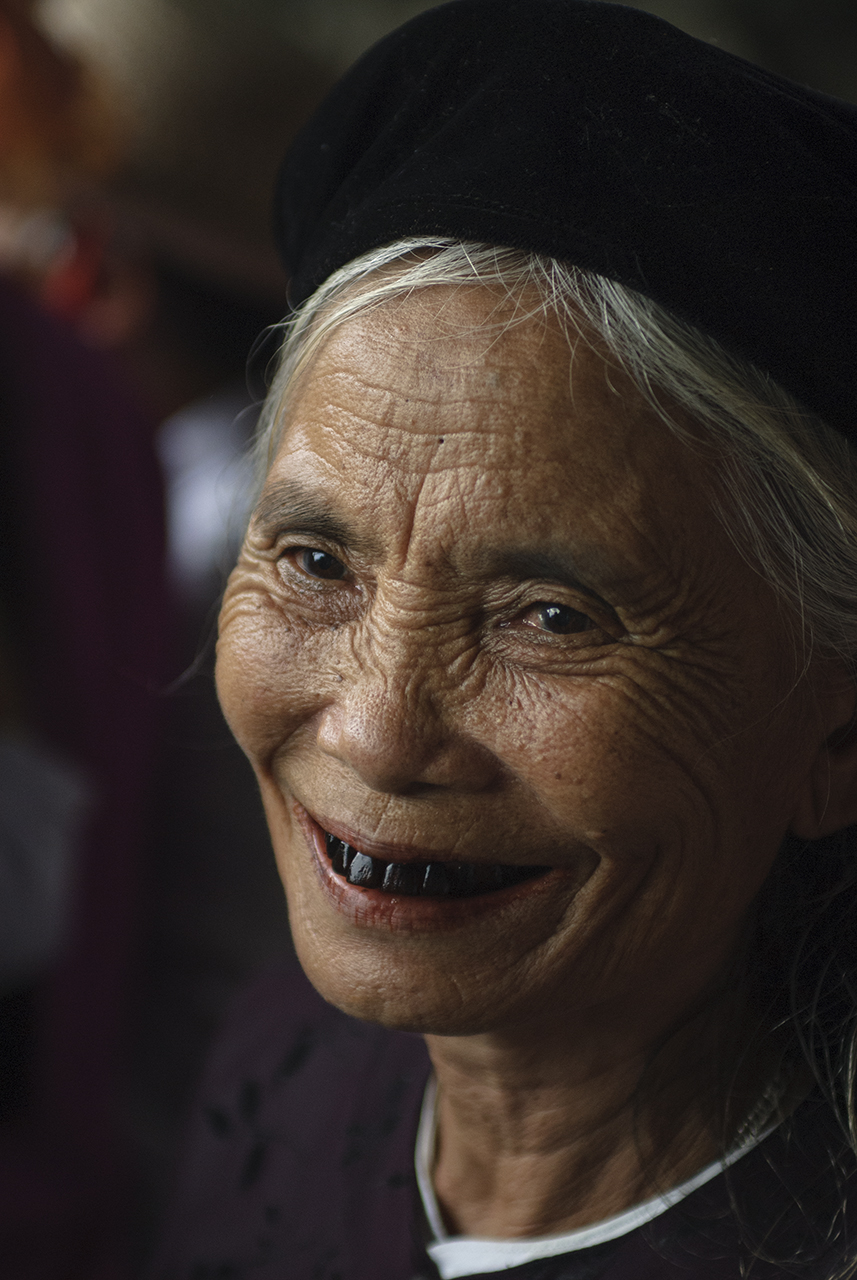
An old Vietnamese lady with blackened teeth.

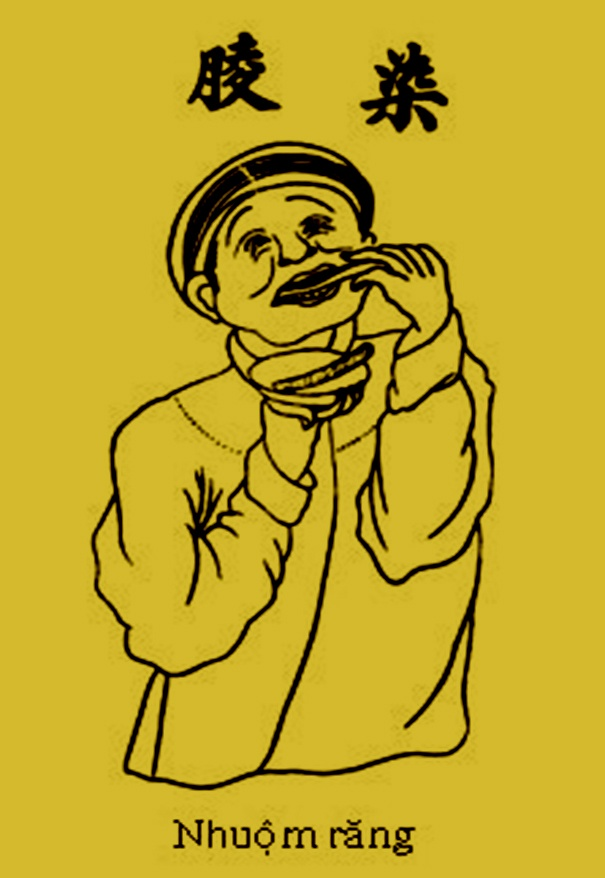
A picture from the Mechanics and Crafts of the People of Annam depicting the Vietnamese custom of teeth blackening. (染𦝄, nhuộm răng)

In Vietnam, teeth blackening (Vietnamese: nhuộm răng) was practiced by the majority Vietnamese people as well as by minority ethnic groups, such as the men of Si La people, who paint their teeth red while the women paint theirs black. These traditions declined in the 20th century, decade by decade with each new generation with in part due to Western influence from French colonists, colonial medical reports from the 1930s, stated that 80 percent of Tonkinese farmers had darkened teeth. Archaeological discovery show that teeth blackening was practiced as early as 400 BCE. Teeth blackening was seen as a sign of beauty. It was also a demonstration of civilization, as there was an idea that white teeth belonged to animals, savages, and evil spirits. In the 1920s, most women in Hanoi had blackened teeth.

==== Process ====
Process of Vietnamese teeth blackening in Tiểu học bản quốc phong tục (小學本國風俗冊).

The process of teeth blackening begins with the sanitisation of the mouth. This was done by brushing the teeth with a mixture of dried betel, stewed charcoal powder, and salt. Before dyeing the teeth, the person who was dyeing had to chew and rinse their teeth with a rice wine-lemon juice mixture to prepare the surface of the teeth for dyeing. This part of the process is often very painful, as it causes the gums to become swollen. A solution of burnt coconut shells is then used on the teeth to obtain the black coloration. Other solutions that were used to dye the teeth black also included an iron solution.

Đoàn Triển in his work, Tiểu học bản quốc phong tục (小學本國風俗冊), explains the process of teeth blackening:

男女十餘歲，穉齒易尽，新齒齐生，各行染齒。其法取赤蟻味數抹，合酸水為藥，敷以榔葉，夜插齒上，十餘次，染成赤色。再以黑礬合藥三五次，染成黑色。男子畧染一番，惟女子妇人，以鮮黑為美。

Nam nữ thập dư tuế, trĩ xỉ dị tận, tân xỉ tề sinh, các hành nhiễm xỉ. Kỳ pháp thủ xích nghĩ vị số mạt, hợp toan thuỷ vi dược, phu dĩ lang diệp, dạ sáp xỉ thượng, thập dư thứ, nhiễm thành xích sắc. Tái dĩ hắc phàn hợp dược tam ngũ thứ, nhiễm thành hắc sắc. Nam tử lược nhiễm nhất phiên, duy nữ tử phụ nhân, dĩ tiên hắc vi mỹ.

When boys and girls are over ten years old, their baby teeth fall out and their permanent teeth grow in evenly. They then undergo teeth blackening. The method is to take several portions of red ant paste (shellac), mix them with sour water to make a concoction, and apply it using betal leaves. At night, the preparation is placed against the teeth. After more than ten applications, the teeth turn red. Then the preparation is mixed with black alum and applied three to five times, turning the teeth black. Men generally blacken their teeth only lightly, where girls and married women consider a deep black to be beautiful.

==== Accounts ====
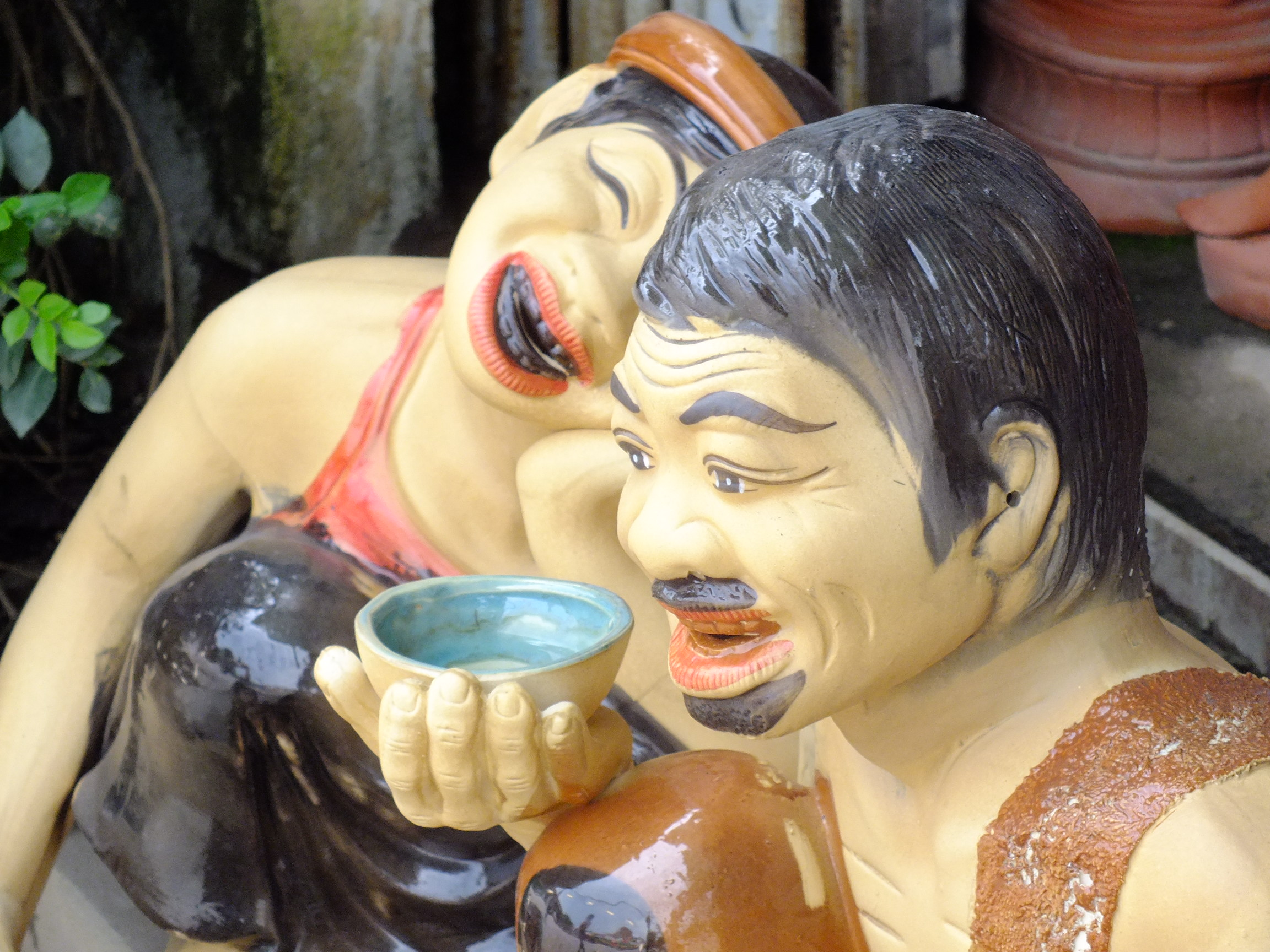
Vietnamese statues depicting the traditional practice of teeth blackening (nhuộm răng đen).

A passage in a 16th century biography of a Korean trader that went to Vietnam, Jowanbyeokjeon (Korean: 조완벽전; Hanja: 趙完璧傳), also mentions these customs,

其國男女皆被髮赤脚。無鞋履。雖官貴者亦然。長者則漆齒。

In that country (Vietnam), both men and women all tie up their hair and go barefoot, without shoes or sandals. Even officials and nobility are the same. As for the respected individuals, they lacquer their teeth.

Another passage in the 12th century Chinese book, Lingwai Daida (simplified Chinese: 岭外代答; traditional Chinese: 嶺外代答; pinyin: Lǐngwài Dàidā) notes that,

其國人烏衣，黑齒，椎髻，徒跣，無貴賤皆然。

The people of that country (Vietnam) wear black clothes, have black teeth, wear their hair in a bun, go barefoot, and there is no distinction between noble and commoner; all are the same.

— 嶺外代答外、卷之二、外國門上、安南國

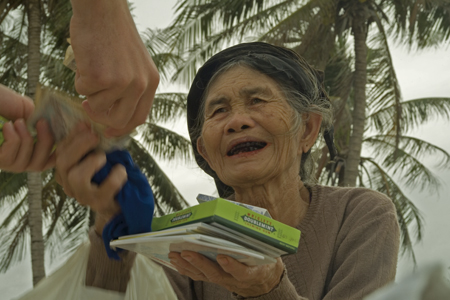
Vietnamese old woman selling chewing gum. Her teeth have been dyed black.

In the 17th century book, An Nam chí nguyên (安南志原), (Note: The origin of the book is a controversial topic, but it is believed to be derived from a work (Giao Chỉ chí; 交趾志) complied during the Ming occupation of Vietnam.) it also records,

南越外紀云其人或椎髻或剪髮，文身跣足， 口赤齒黑，尊卑皆食檳榔

The Outer Chronicles of Nanyue states that the people there either wear their hair in a topknot or cut it short, have tattooed bodies, and go barefoot. Their mouths are red and their teeth black, and both the rich and poor chew betel nut.

In the 17th century book, A Description of the Kingdom of Tonqueen by Samuel Baron, notes

Both boys and girls, when they are past sixteen or seventeen years of age, black their teeth as the Japanese do, and let their nails grow as the Chinese, the longest being accounted the finest, which has place amongst persons of quality and those of wealth only.

The 16th century Ming dynasty book Shuyu Zhouzi Lu (simplified Chinese: 殊域周咨录; traditional Chinese: 殊域周咨錄; pinyin: Shūyù Zhōuzī Lù) which recorded history and customs of foreign nations around China had a section regarding teeth blackening in Vietnam,

推髻剪髮，紋身跣足，口赤齒黑，好食檳榔。

They push up their hair into a bun and cut their hair short, tattoo their bodies, go barefoot, have red mouths and black teeth, and like to chew betel nut.

During a brushtalk between Korean envoy (I Sangbong; Korean: 이상봉; Hanja: 李商鳳) and Vietnamese envoy (Lê Quý Đôn; chữ Hán: 黎貴惇) on 30 December 1760, I Sangbong mentioned the Vietnamese custom of teeth blackening that he observed in Lê Quý Đôn and the other Vietnamese envoys.

李商鳳曰：「果然貴國禮樂文物、不讓中華一頭、俺亦慣聞。今覩盛儀衣冠之制、彷彿我東、而被髮漆齒亦有所拠、幸乞明教。」

I Sangbong said: "Indeed, the cultural artifacts of your esteemed country, especially in rituals, music, and literature, are no less impressive than those of China. I have heard about it before. Today, seeing the splendid ceremonial attire and the regulations for attire and headgear, it seems reminiscent of our Eastern customs. Even the hairstyles and the lacquered teeth has its own basis. Fortunately, I can inquire and learn more. Please enlighten me."

In the Veritable Records of the Joseon Dynasty, there is a record on 22 January 1692, where king Sukjong asked about the attire of the Annamese envoys in China,

上聞安南使臣，亦以朝貢之燕，問其衣冠制度。黯對：「以頭着黑紗帽，而以白銀爲揷角穴，身服紅錦有紋團領，而胸背繡龍形，制樣小於我國之制，帶率皆黑衣而着黑巾，巾制甚高，無論尊卑，盡被頭髮，恒嚼檳榔，對客不輟，牙齒皆黑。若着漆然...

The king heard about the Annamese envoys and, at the tribute banquet, also asked about their clothing and headgear system. Min Am replied: “On their heads they wear black gauze caps, with white silver for the corner-pin holes; on their bodies they wear red brocade round-collared robes with patterns, and dragons embroidered on the chest and back. The style is smaller than our country’s. Their attendants all wear black clothes and black headcloths; the headcloth style is very tall. Regardless of high or low rank, all cover their hair with it. They constantly chew betel nut and do not stop even before guests; their teeth are all black, as if lacquered…”

During the Ming dynasty's conquest during the Ming–Hồ War, the Ming dynasty attempted a serious effort to assimilate the Vietnamese by ordering them to wear long hair and to stop teeth blackening so they could have white teeth and long hair like Chinese. The Vietnamese people were ordered to stop cutting and instead grow their hair long and switch to Han Chinese clothing in only a month by a Ming officials. Ming administrators said their mission was to "civilize" the unorthodox, by Han Chinese standards, appearance of the Vietnamese.

After regaining independence, a royal edict was issued by Vietnam in 1474, forbidding Vietnamese from adopting foreign languages, hairstyles and clothes like that of the Lao, Champa or the "Northerners" which referred to the Ming. The edict was recorded in the 1479 Complete Chronicle of Dai Viet of Ngô Sĩ Liên.

==== Literature ====
There is also a famous exhortation by emperor Quang Trung (1753–1792) before a battle with the Qing army where he mentions the customs of the Vietnamese people including teeth blackening,

打未底𨱽𩯀 (Đánh cho để dài tóc) Fight to keep our hair long.
打未底顛𪘵 (Đánh cho để đen răng) Fight to keep our teeth black.
打朱伮隻輪不返 (Đánh cho nó chích luân bất phản) Fight them so none of their war chariots could run off.
打朱伮片甲不還 (Đánh cho nó phiến giáp bất hoàn) Fight them so that not a single piece of armour returns.
打朱使知南國英雄之有主 (Đánh cho sử tri Nam Quốc anh hùng chi hữu chủ) Fight to let them know the heroes of the South has its own lord.

=== Philippines ===
In the Philippines, Spanish colonial official and historian, Antonio de Morga, recorded in his book, Sucesos de las Islas Filipinas (1609), on how local men and women of the Philippines cared and presented themselves at the time. It was noted by Morga:

All are very careful of their teeth, which from a very early age they file and render even, with stones and iron. They dye them a black color, which is lasting, and which preserves their teeth until they are very old

The late 19th century Filipino nationalist, writer, and polymath, José Rizal, commented in his annotations to Morga's account that: "This custom still exists... This custom exists also among the married women of Japan, as a Sign of their chastity. It is now falling into disuse."

=== Thailand ===
In Thailand, teeth darkening was an established symbol of beauty, achieved for centuries with a paste called misi, and love poems used to compare the dyed teeth of the beloveds to ebony and other valuable woods. When the 19th-century Thai king Mongkut lost his teeth, he replaced them with artificial teeth carved from dark red sappan wood.

=== Eastern India ===
Colouring teeth black was a tradition practised by various tribes of Eastern Himalayas, Naga Hills and Manipur in India, such as the Konyak Nagas and the Wancho Nagas.

=== Other areas ===
Teeth blackening has been documented throughout a number of other peoples in Asia and Oceania:

- China
  - Blang people
  - Dai
  - Hmoob
  - Jino
  - Lahu
  - Yao
- Taiwan
  - Taiwanese indigenous peoples
- Laos
  - Hani
  - Katu
  - Phunoi
- Philippines
  - Luzon
  - Mindanao
- Pacific Islands
  - Palau
  - Yap
  - Mariana Islands
- Thailand
- Akha
- Lisu
- Vietnam
  - Kinh
  - Dao
  - Lu
  - Hmong people
  - Nùng
  - Si La

== South Asia ==
Teeth blackening was also documented across Islamic culture in South Asia:

The agent of choice for teeth blackening became known as missī, a powdery mixture of (1) iron and copper sulphate, (2) a plant source of tannins, such as myrobalans, and (3) flavouring agents. The use of missī, thought to be sanctified by Fāṭimah, the Prophet's daughter, became deeply engrained in Islamic culture across much of the subcontinent. Teeth blackening as a life cycle event related to sexual maturity and in its literary portrayals acquired distinct sexual overtones. It was integrated into the culture of courtesans and prostitutes where missī became synonymous with the ritual of selling a woman’s virginity. Although not a primary motivation, medicinal considerations also played a role in the use of missī. Early references to blackening the gums and edges of the teeth suggest a connection to an older tradition of filing the interstices between teeth which had become prohibited by Islamic law. Geographically and culturally distinct traditions of teeth blackening also prevailed among diverse indigenous groups living along the slopes of the Eastern Himalayas, from Nepal through Meghalaya and Assam to Nagaland. Here teeth were blackened by applying the wood tar of specific plants or chewing specific plant products. These practices related technologically and culturally to the wide-spread teeth blackening traditions of island and mainland South-east Asia and beyond.

There is also evidence of the use of misi in India among some practitioners of Hinduism, mainly to blacken the gums and sometimes the teeth; the 16th century poet Malik Muhammad Jayasi dedicated some lines in his epic poem Padmavat to the smile of the princess Rani Padmini, who ruled Chittorgarh in the 13th century, in which he compares her teeth to diamonds on black pedestals:

Her teeth, like diamonds on a pedestal:
between each, deep, deep black.
Like a gleam of lightning in a dark Autumn night,
so are these thirty-two caused to flash.

— —Malik Muhammad Jayasi

== Africa ==
=== Madagascar ===
In Madagascar, teeth blackening has been documented since at least François Cauche's 1638 French voyage. Inhabitants blackened their teeth and tongue by chewing the seed or grain of a balisier tree.
