= Khir language =

Loloish language of northern Laos

Khir
- Laya
- Native to: Laos
- Region: Phongsaly province
- Native speakers: 3,200 (2023)
- Language family: Sino-Tibetan: (Tibeto-Burman); Lolo–Burmese; Loloish; Southern; Siloid; Khir

Language codes
- ISO 639-3: None (mis)
- Glottolog: None

Khir (Lao: ເຄີ /kʰɯ/, Kheu; autonym: ka55 ɯ21 or la21 ja21) is a Loloish language of northern Laos. It is closely related to Cosao.

Khir is spoken in Nyot U District, Phongsaly Province, including in Kang village.

== Names ==
The autonym is ka55 ɯ21. A less commonly used autonym, la21 ja21, is an autonym elicited in Khir Tai language.

The exonym is pronounced khɯ but is officially spelled Khir (Lao: ເຄີ).

== Demographics ==
As of 2023, the ethnic Khir population is 3,200.

== Dialects ==
There are 6 dialects of Khir, all of which are mutually intelligible with each other. Each dialcet has 300 to 800 speakers.

- Kang: described by Kato (2008) and is mainly spoken in Kangnamlae (formerly Kang) and Phiangsaeng Villages. 600 people.
- Khir: spoken in Khir Neua, Khir Tai, and Chompho Villages. 440 people.
- Ka: spoken in Ka and Chompho Villages. 560 people.
- Hin: mainly spoken in Hin and Palan Villages, with 5 or 6 households in Somheuang Village. 460 people.
- Paek: spoken in Paek Village. 300 people.
- Somheuang: spoken in Somheuang and Nakong Villages. 860 people.

Below is a comparison of lexical differences among each of the six Khir dialects.

| Gloss | Kang | Somheuang | Khir | Hin | Ka | Paek |
|---|---|---|---|---|---|---|
| eye | mla33sɯ21 | mja33sɯ21 | mɛ33sɯ21 | ma33nɯ̰33 | mɛ33hɯ21 | mɛ33nɯ̰33 |
| chicken | a33 | ha33 | ha33ɕḭ33 | a21ɕḭ33 | ja33ʨḭ33 | ja33ʨḭ33 |
| language | sɯ21to21 | mi33 | ne21bu21 | to21ma33 | tɔ21 | tɔ21 |
| bee | blə21 | pja21 | pɛ21ɔ21 | i21ɕi55 | pja21 | pja21 |
| face | mla33phlo21 | mja33phlo21 | ma33phɔ21 | ma33phɔ21 | mɛ33phɔ21 | mɛ33phɔ21 |
| full (not empty) | a21blɯ33 | a21blɯ33 | bɯ33 | pɯ33 | pɯ33 | pɯ33 |
| sweat | tsha55qhi21 | ʨhɛ55khli21 | sɛ55khi21 | sɛ55khi21 | khɛ21su21 | khi21ʨha55 |
