= Gokhy language =

Southern Loloish language

Gokhy
- Gɔkhý
- Native to: China
- Region: Yunnan
- Language family: Sino-Tibetan: (Tibeto-Burman); Lolo–Burmese; Loloish; Southern Loloish; Akha? Siloid?; Gokhy

Language codes
- ISO 639-3: None (mis)
- Linguist List: 0ns
- Glottolog: None

Gokhy (Gɔkhý) is a Southern Loloish language of the border region of China, Thailand, and Myanmar. They are also referred to by other Akha groups as the Akhə Akha. Speakers live mostly in China. It is closely related to Akha, and that it is part of the Hanoid (Southern Loloish) group of languages, but is uncertain of its classification within Hanoid.

There is one Gɔ̀khý village in northern Thailand with about 100 people. The Gɔkhý had of Thailand migrated from near Menghai, Yunnan via Myanmar.

== Bibliography ==
- Hansson, Inga-Lill. 1990. "Akhə Akha and Pahi Akha — two Little Known Burmese-Yipho Languages." In The master said, to study and--: to Soren Egerod on the occasion of his sixty-seventh birthday, edited by Birthe Arendrup et al.. 89-105. East Asian Institute, University of Copenhagen.
- Hansson, Inga-Lill. 1992. A Comparison of Gɔkhy and Akha. In Dai, Qingxia and Shi, Jinbo and Wu, Jingzhong and Yang, Yingxin and Xu, Shixuan and Fu, Ailan and Wu Hede (eds.), 彝缅语研究 YiMianyu yanjiu [Studies on Yi-Burmese Languages], 465-558. Chengdu: Sichuan Nationalities Publishing House.
