= Si La people =

Si La
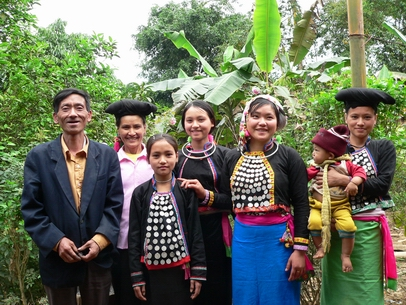
- The Si La people with their distinctive clothing.

Regions with significant populations
- Vietnam 909 (2019); Laos 3,151 (2015)

Languages
- Sila, Vietnamese, Lao, others

Religion
- Traditional religion/ancestor worship, Buddhism, Christianity

The Si La (also Sila or Syla) are an ethnic group of about 3,151 people living in northern Laos and another 600 living in two villages: Nậm Sin and Seo Hay of Lai Châu Province, Northwest region, Vietnam. In Vietnam, the Si La people are recognized as one of the 54 ethnic groups in Vietnam, with a population of 909 according to the 2019 census.

== Culture ==
The Si La people speak a Tibeto-Burman language closely related to Hani (Edmondson 2002). Their primary occupation is the cultivation of cereals, augmented by hunting and foraging. One of the most distinctive Si La customs is tooth painting: men traditionally painted their teeth red, while women painted theirs black. The custom is increasingly uncommon among the younger generation.
