= General Sciences Library of Ho Chi Minh City =

Library in Ho Chi Minh City, Vietnam

- Thư viện Khoa học Tổng hợp Thành phố Hồ Chí Minh
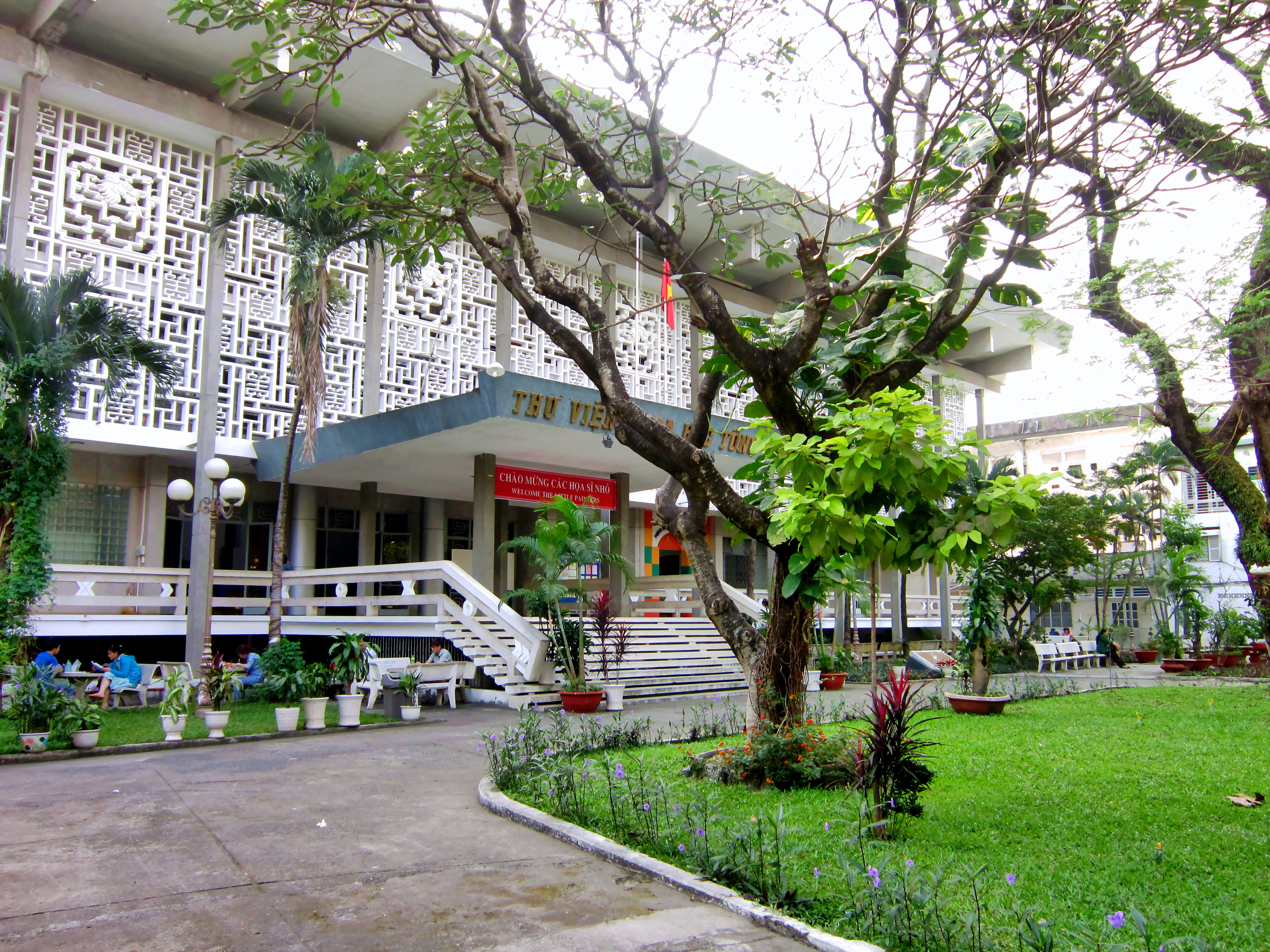
- Front of Library
- 10.775221647698078°N 106.6993520408711°E
- Location: 69 Lý Tự Trọng Street, Bến Thành Ward, District 1, Ho Chi Minh City, Vietnam
- Type: Public
- Established: 1868

Other information
- Director: Bui Xuan Duc
- Public transit access: L1 L2 L4 Ben Thanh station, Opera House station (Line 1 only)
- Website: http://www.thuvientphcm.gov.vn

The General Sciences Library of Ho Chi Minh City is a Vietnamese public library. It is run by the Department of Culture and Sports of Ho Chi Minh City. The library's main functions are to collect, preserve and organise library resources. The library has a large reading hall and several floors with stacks dedicated to its collection of over two million volumes. The library has a children's area, printing and copying resources, and a portal for searching online database.

== History ==
The building was first used as a library in 1868. Known as the Documentation Library of the Government of Cochinchina, it was established by Admiral-Governor Marie Gustave Hector Ohier. It became a public library in 1882, Vietnam's first; In 1975 the library offered a motorbike service to meet the needs of more remote areas of the Southwestern areas such as Duong Minh Chau. The library received its name on April 14, 1978, when the People's Committee of Ho Chi Minh issued the decision.

In 1993, the library began publishing a biannual journal called The Southern Information Library. 1995 saw the establishment of the first multimedia room and in 1999, a reading room for the blind was created. In 2007 the first mobile internet library launched, and in 2013, a project to begin digitization of library documents was initiated.

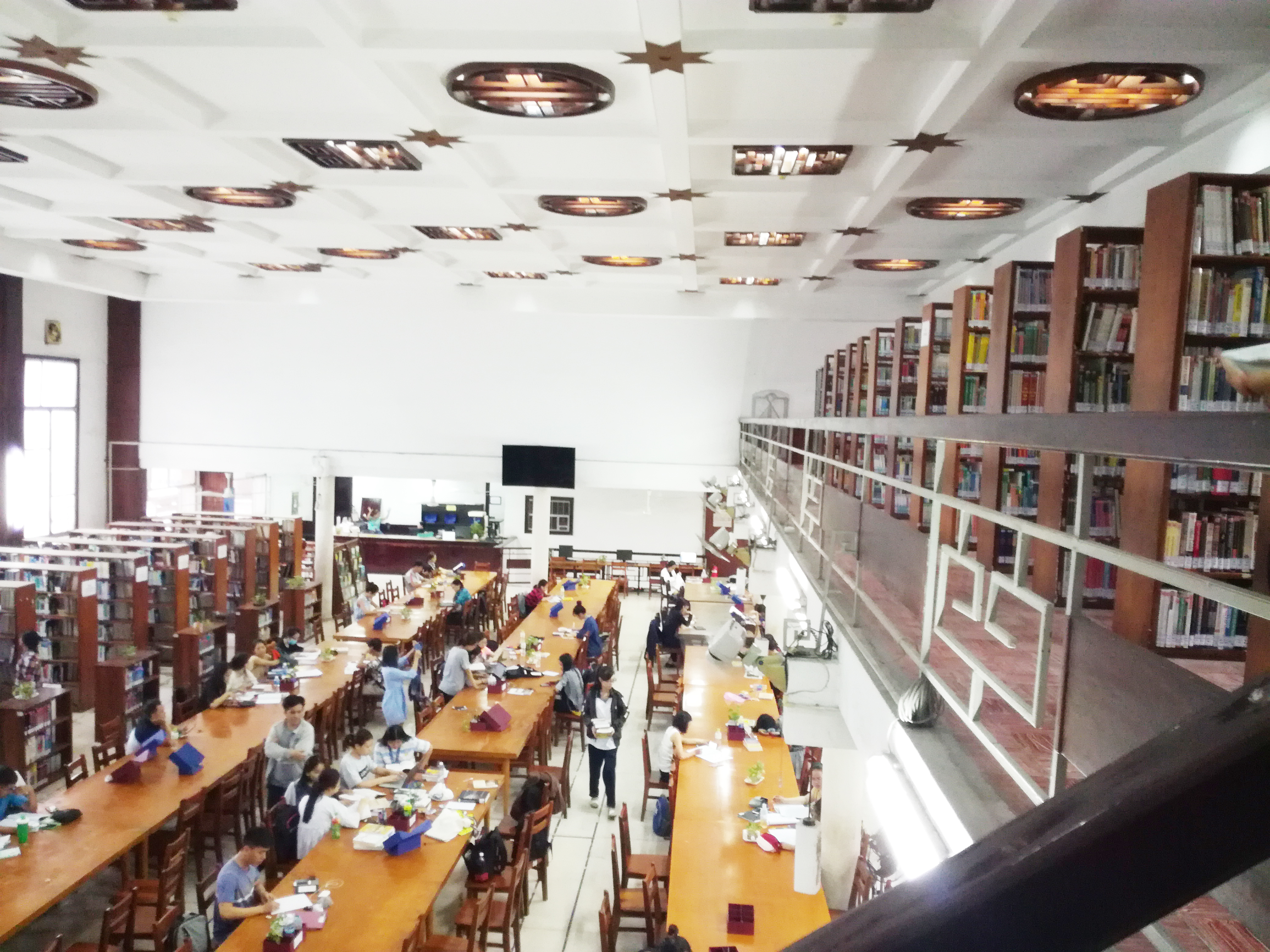
Interior of the library

== Services ==
The library offers the traditional services of lending and offering reference help. They have reference computers with access to many online databases, such as ProQuest, Britannica and others. The library has tablets that patrons may use. Five study group areas are equipped with LCD monitors. Free Wi-Fi is available throughout the building.

== Librarian support ==
- Professional support for provincial libraries in the south
- Practical guidance for students in the Faculty of Library Information
- Helping agencies and enterprises in the city library organization.
- Teaching the Faculty of Information Libraries of Colleges and Universities

== See also ==
- List of libraries in Vietnam
