= National Library of Vietnam =

National library (est. 1917)

- Thư viện Quốc gia Việt Nam
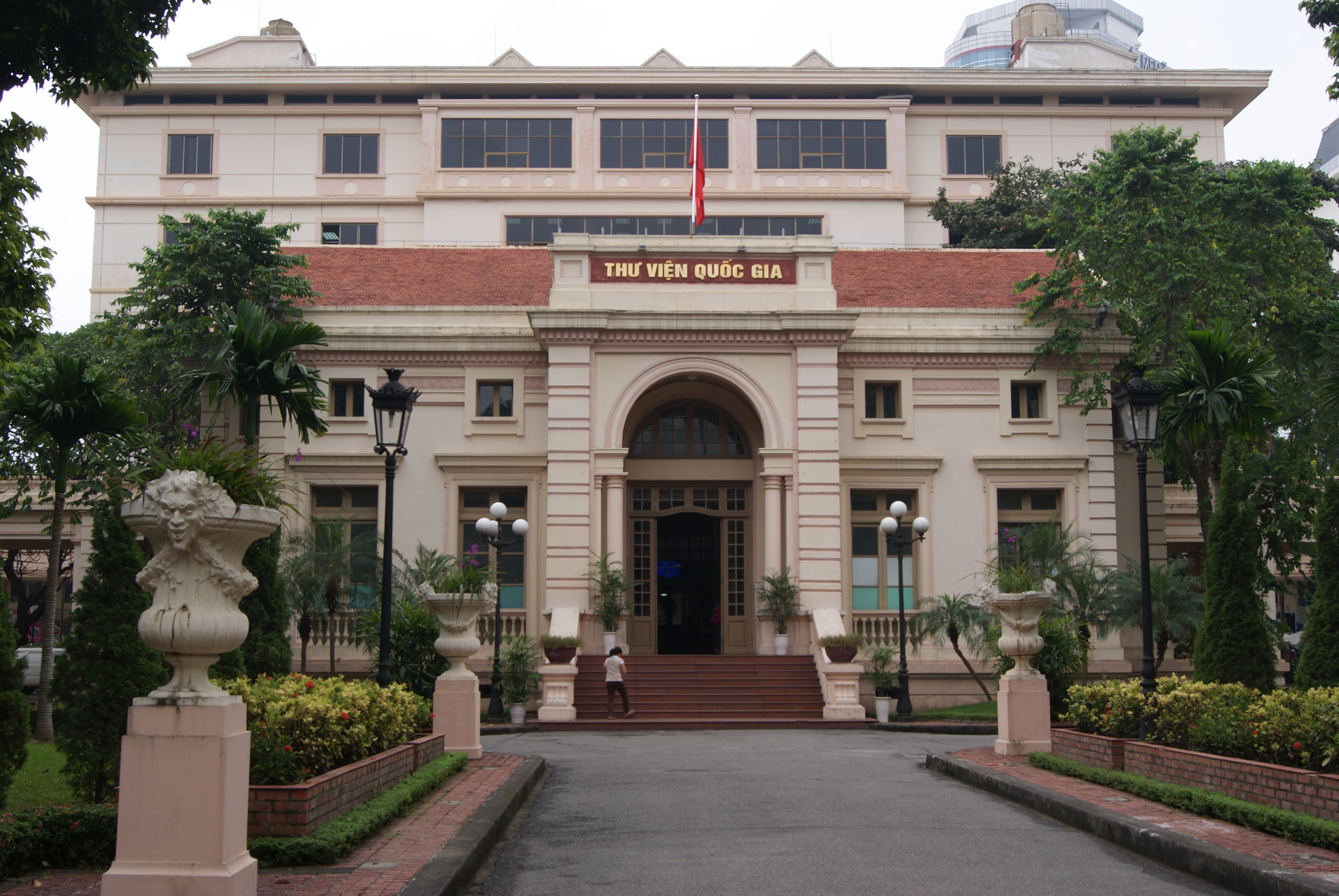
- 21°01′33″N 105°50′58″E
- Location: 31 Trang Thi street, Hoan Kiem district, Hanoi, Vietnam, Vietnam
- Type: National library
- Established: 29 November 1917; 108 years ago

Other information
- Director: Kieu Thuy Nga
- Employees: 173
- Website: nlv.gov.vn

The National Library of Vietnam (Vietnamese: Thư viện Quốc gia Việt Nam; French: Bibliothèque Nationale du Viet Nam) is the national library in Vietnam and it is located in Hanoi. It was established by a decree of 29 November 1917 as the central library of Indochina. In September 1919 the library was made open to the public with an intent to support and promote western archive and library work.

It took the successive names of Pierre Pasquier (28 February 1935), Bibliothèque Nationale (National Library, 20 October 1945), Bibliothèque Centrale de Hanoï (Central Library of Hanoi, February 1947) before being given its present name at 21 November 1958.

== Website and digital collections ==
The library website is available in Vietnamese, English and French. It provides the latest news concerning the library and gives details about recent library events and activities. In addition, the website includes information about professional development, publications, and librarianship in Vietnam. The website also provides information about digital collections. These collections include:

- Doctoral theses collection, which contains over 47,894 Vietnamese doctoral theses.
- Indochina Collection: publications and copies dating from the 17th century to 1954 about Indochina.
- Books and maps about Hanoi.
- Han-Nom collection, contains manuscripts and prints are in Nôm and Hán and, in collaboration with the Vietnamese Nôm Preservation Foundation, metadata and images were put online to create the Digital Library of Hán-Nôm.
- Tapes, CD-ROMS. Includes disks on the Vietnamese Communist Party and language learning.
- English books about Vietnam.

== See also ==
- List of libraries in Vietnam
- List of national libraries
