= Paza language =

Loloish language of northern Laos

Paza
- Phusang
- Native to: Laos
- Ethnicity: Akha
- Native speakers: 2,100 (2010)
- Language family: Sino-Tibetan: (Tibeto-Burman); Lolo–Burmese; Loloish; Southern; Siloid; Paza

Language codes
- ISO 639-3: None (mis)
- Glottolog: None

Paza (Phusang, Phosang, Phousang, Basar, Bazar, (Pusa?); autonym: pa33 za33) is a Loloish language of northern Laos. Paza speakers consist of 2,100 people distributed in 8 villages of Ban Phusang Mai, Muang Samphan, Phongsaly, and 1 village in Oudomxay. It is documented as "Phusang" in Kato (2008), which has a brief word list of the language collected from Phusangkao village, Samphan District.

== Sources ==
- Kato, Takashi. 2008. Linguistic Survey of Tibeto-Burman languages in Lao P.D.R. Tokyo: Institute for the Study of Languages and Cultures of Asia and Africa (ILCAA).
