= Sila language (Sino-Tibetan) =

Loloish language of Laos and Vietnam

Sila
- Sida
- Native to: Laos, Vietnam
- Ethnicity: Si La people
- Native speakers: 4,100 (2015 & 2019 censuses)
- Language family: Sino-Tibetan: Tibeto-Burman; Lolo–Burmese; Loloish; Southern; Siloid; Sila

Language codes
- ISO 639-3: slt
- Glottolog: sila1247
- ELP: Sila

Sila (also called Sida) is a Loloish language spoken by 2,000 people in Laos and Vietnam (Bradley 1997). Sila speakers are an officially recognized group in Vietnam, where they are known as the Si La.

== Phonology ==
=== Consonants ===
Sila Consonants
		Labial	Dental/ Alveolar	Palatal	Velar
Nasal		m	n	ɲ	ŋ
Stop	plain	p	t	tɕ	k
Stop	aspirated	pʰ	tʰ	tɕʰ	kʰ
Fricative	voiceless	f	s		x
Fricative	voiced				ɣ
Approximant	voiceless		l̥		
Approximant	voiced	w	l	j	

Unaspirated plosives are usually realised as voiced stops. Phonetically, /l̥/ is realized as [͡l̥l]. The palatal nasal is noted as /ɲ/ although the phonetic realisation is closer to [ȵ], with the blade of the tongue remaining at a short distance from the palate.

==== Example contrasts ====
/p/ vs. /pʰ/: /pa33la33/ ‘moon’ vs. /ɐ31pʰa31/ ‘leaf’

/t/ vs. /tʰ/: /ta31/ ‘to look at’ vs. /tʰa33/ ‘PROHIBITIVE’

/tɕ/ vs. /tɕʰ/: /tɕɐ31/ ‘to have, to exist’ vs. /tɕʰɐ31/ ‘to speak’

/k/ vs. /kʰ/: /ki55lɯ55/ ‘green’ vs. /a31kʰi55/ ‘foot’

/f/ vs. /s/: /fɔ31/ ‘to protect vs. /sɔ31/ ‘to study’

/x/ vs. /ɣ/: /xɯ55/ ‘gold’ vs. /ɣɯ55/ ‘good’

/m/ vs. /n/: /ma̰31/ ‘person’ vs. /na̰31/ ‘deep’

/ɲ/ vs. /ŋ/: /ɲa55/ ‘frost’ vs. /ŋa55/ ‘salty’

/w/ vs. /j/: /wa33/ ‘careless’ vs. /ja31/ ‘child’

/l/ vs. /l̥/: /lɐ33wa33/ ‘palm of hand’ vs. /l̥a33/ ‘to fall down’

=== Vowels ===
	Front		Back	
	Unrounded	Rounded	Unrounded	Rounded
Close	i	y	ɯ	u
Close-mid	e	ø	ɤ	o
Open-mid	ɛ			ɔ
Open	a		ɐ	

All vowels can be creaky vowels, which are contrastive.

Sila diphthongs are /ɤi/, /ai/, /ao/, /oa/.

==== Example contrasts ====
/i/ vs. /e/ vs. /ɛ/: /pi33/ ‘to win’ vs. /pe33/ ‘to divide up’ vs. /pɛ33jo31/ ‘dragon’

/y/ vs. /ø/: /tʰy31/ ‘to spit out/ vs. /tʰø31/ ‘to wrap up’

/ɯ/ vs. /ɤ/: /tɯ31/ ‘to hit’ vs. /tɤ31/ ‘to soak’

/u/ vs. /o/ vs. /ɔ/: /tʰu55/ ‘thick’ vs. /tʰo55/ ‘to open a hole’ vs. /tʰɔ55/ ‘number of times/

/a/ vs. /ɐ/: /tɕa31/ ‘to eat’ vs. /tɕɐ31/ ‘to have, to exist/

=== Tones ===
Sila has three lexical tonemes and two grammatical tonemes.

Toneme	Class
55	Lexical
35	Grammatical
53	Grammatical
33	Lexical
31	Lexical

=== Phonotactics ===
All consonants can occur as onsets, with /m/ able to form a syllabic nasal.

/j/ and /l/ may occur as medials, but /j/ only after bilabial and velar stops and /m/, and /l/ only after bilabial stops and /m/.

Unvoiced stops and nasals can occur as codas, but these are only found in words recently borrowed from Lao

== Distribution ==
According to Edmondson (2002), the Sila number about 700 people in Vietnam and live in the following 3 villages.

- Seo Hay, Can Hồ Commune, Lai Châu Province, Vietnam
- Xì Theo Chai, Can Hồ Commune, Lai Châu Province, Vietnam
- Nậm Sín, Mường Nhé Commune, Điện Biên Province, Vietnam

According to the elderly Sila, seven Sila families had emigrated from Mường U and Mường Lá of Phongsaly Province, Laos, 175 years ago. They initially arrived at a location called Mường Tùng, and relocated several times before arriving at their present locations.

In Laos, Sila is spoken in:

- Naahok Village, Nyot U District, Phongsaly Province
- Ban Ban Sida, Muang Namtha, Luang Namtha Province (autonym: vɛ33 ɲɯ33)
- Chaohoi village, Nyot U District; Phongsai village, Bun Neua District (autonym: go55ɯ55 a11ma11) (Kingsada 1999)
- Longthang village, Nyot U District; Sida village, Luang Namtha District, Luang Namtha province (autonym: si33 la33) (Shintani 2001)
- Namsing village, Nyot U District (autonym: ko55 ɯ21) (Kato 2008)

== Sources ==
- Edmondson, Jerold A. 2002. "The Central and Southern Loloish Languages of Vietnam". Proceedings of the Twenty-Eighth Annual Meeting of the Berkeley Linguistics Society: Special Session on Tibeto-Burman and Southeast Asian Linguistics (2002), pp. 1–13.
- Ma Ngọc Dung. 2000. Văn hóa Si La. Hà Nội: Nhà xuất ban văn hóa dân tôc.
