= Old Yue language =

Ancient language of China

Old Yue
- Yue
- Native to: Yue, Ganyue, Dong'ou, Minyue, Nanyue, Ouyue, Luoyue
- Region: Southern China
- Ethnicity: Baiyue
- Extinct: c. 1st century AD
- Language family: Unclassified (Kra-Dai? Austroasiatic? Austronesian? Hmong-Mien?)

Language codes
- ISO 639-3: None (mis)
- Glottolog: None
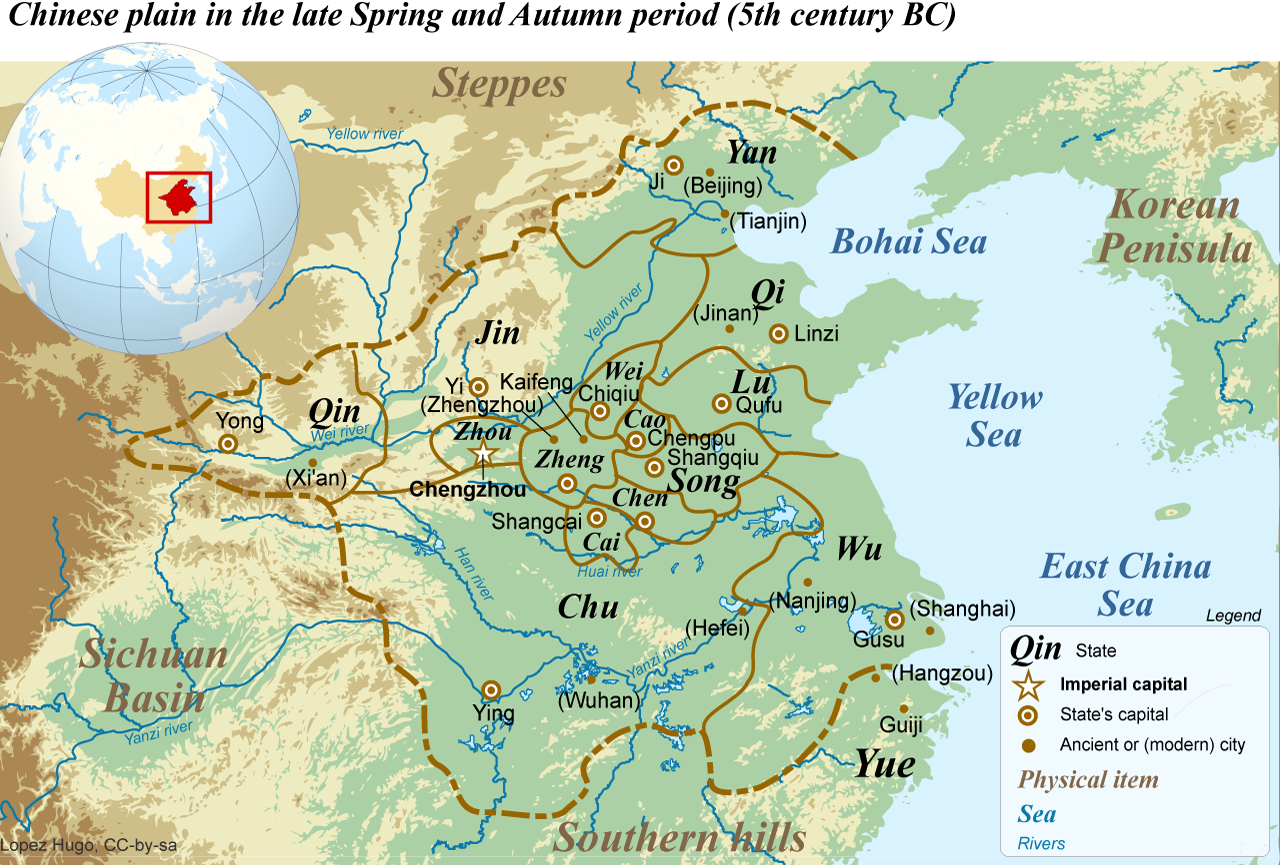
- Map of the Chinese plain at the start of the Warring States Period in the 5th century BC.

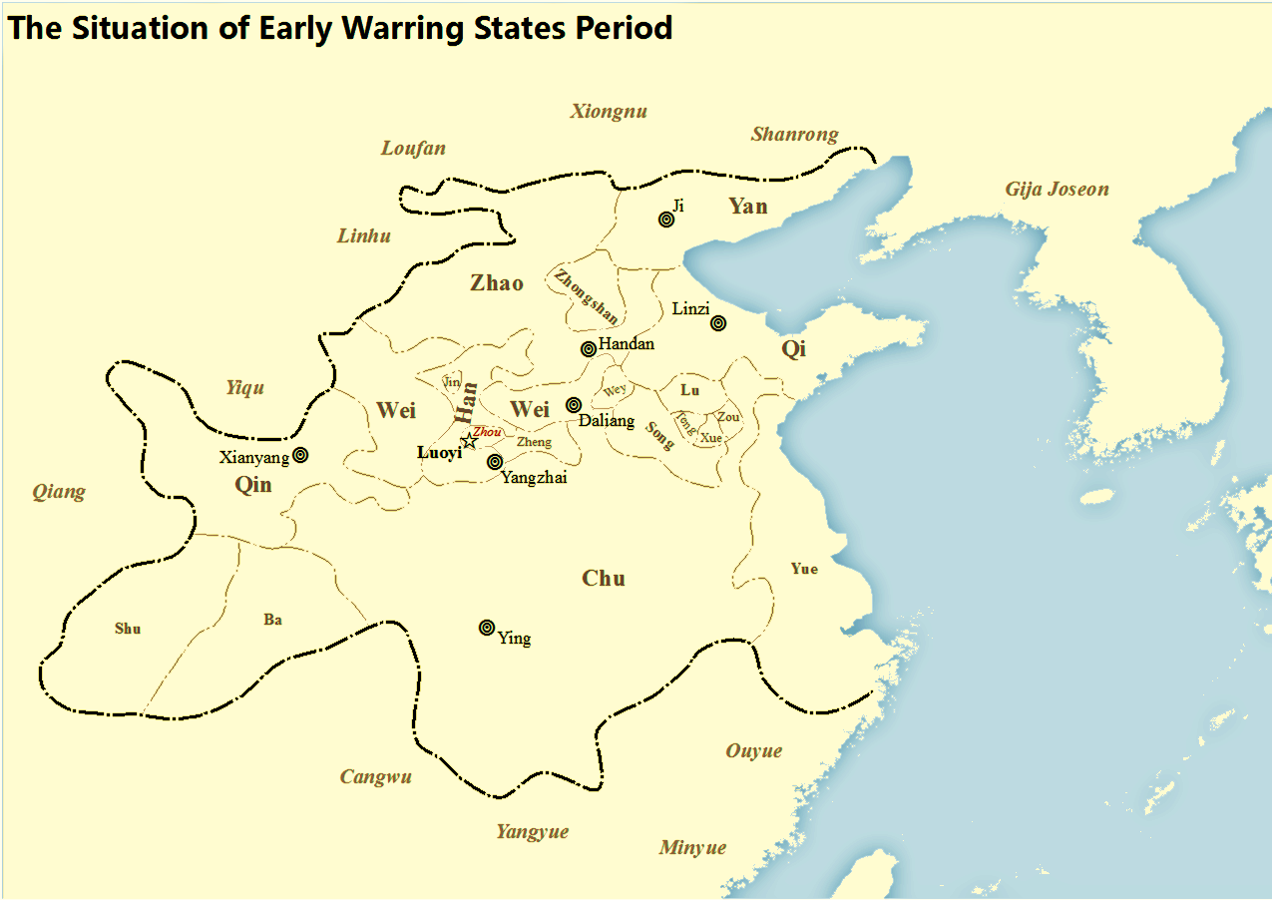
Map of the Warring States Period, after Yue conquered Wu. Other Baiyue peoples are shown in the south.

The Old Yue language (Note: Chinese: 古越語; pinyin: Gǔyuè yǔ; Jyutping: Gu2 Jyut6 Jyu5; Pe̍h-ōe-jī: Kó͘-oa̍t-gí / Kó͘-oa̍t-gír / Kó͘-oa̍t-gú; Vietnamese: Tiếng Việt cổ) is an unclassified language or set of various languages spoken in the state of Yue during the Eastern Zhou dynasty. It may also refer broadly to the languages spoken by Yue peoples in any of the Yue polities in southern China and northern Vietnam c. 700 BCE – c. 100 BCE.

Knowledge of Yue speech is limited to fragmentary references and possible loanwords in Sinitic languages. The longest attestation is the Song of the Yue Boatman, a short song transcribed phonetically in Chinese characters in 528 BC and included, with a Chinese translation, in the Garden of Stories compiled by Liu Xiang five centuries later. Scholars disagree about which languages the Yue spoke, and draw candidates from the non-Sinitic language families still represented in areas of southern China.

== Classification theories ==
Candidates for the Old Yue language include Kra–Dai, Hmong–Mien, and Austroasiatic languages. Chinese, Kra–Dai, Hmong–Mien, and the Vietic branch of Austroasiatic have similar tone systems, syllable structure, grammatical features and lack of inflection, but these features are believed to have spread by means of diffusion across the Mainland Southeast Asia linguistic area, rather than indicating common descent.

- Scholars in China often assume that the Yue spoke an early form of Kra–Dai. According to Sagart (2008), this is far from self-evident, because the core of the Kra–Dai area geographically is located in Hainan and the China–Vietnam border region, which is beyond the extreme southern end of the Yue area. The linguist Wei Qingwen gave a rendering of the "Song of the Yue boatman" in Standard Zhuang. Zhengzhang Shangfang proposed an interpretation of the song in written Thai (dating from the late 13th century) as the closest available approximation to the original language, but his interpretation remains controversial.
- Peiros (2011) shows with his analysis that the homeland of Austroasiatic is somewhere near the Yangtze. He suggests southern Sichuan or slightly west from it, as the likely homeland of proto-Austroasiatic speakers before they migrated to other parts of China and then into Southeast Asia. He further suggests that the family must be as old as proto-Austronesian and proto-Sino-Tibetan or even older. The linguists Sagart (2011) and Bellwood (2013) support the theory of an origin of Austroasiatic along the Yangtze river in southern China.
- Sagart (2008) suggests that the Old Yue language, together with the proto-Austronesian language, was descended from the language or languages of the Tánshíshān‑Xītóu culture complex (modern-day Fujian province of China), making the Old Yue language a sister language to proto-Austronesian, which Sagart sees as the origin of the Kra–Dai languages.

Behr (2009) also notes that the Chǔ dialect of Old Chinese was influenced by several substrata, predominantly Kra-Dai, but also possibly Austroasiatic, Austronesian and Hmong-Mien.

=== Kra–Dai arguments ===
The proto-Kra–Dai language has been hypothesized to originate in the Lower Yangtze valleys. Ancient Chinese texts refer to non-Sinitic languages spoken across this substantial region and their speakers as "Yue". Although those languages are extinct, traces of their existence could be found in unearthed inscriptional materials, ancient Chinese historical texts and non-Han substrata in various Southern Chinese dialects. Thai, one of the Tai languages and the most-spoken language in the Kra–Dai language family, has been used extensively in historical-comparative linguistics to identify the origins of language(s) spoken in the ancient region of South China. One of the very few direct records of non-Sinitic speech in pre-Qin and Han times having been preserved so far is the "Song of the Yue Boatman" (Yueren Ge 越人歌), which was transcribed phonetically in Chinese characters in 528 BC, and found in the 善说 Shanshuo chapter of the Shuoyuan 说苑 or 'Garden of Persuasions'.

Willeam Meacham (1996) reports that Chinese linguists have shown strong evidence of Tai vestiges in former Yue areas: Lin (1990) found Tai elements in some Min dialects, Zhenzhang (1990) has proposed Tai etymologies and interpretations for certain place names in the former states of Wu and Yue, and Wei (1982) found similarities in the words, combinations and rhyming scheme between the "Song of the Yue Boatman" and the Kam–Tai languages.

James R. Chamberlain (2016) proposes that the Kra-Dai language family was formed as early as the 12th century BCE in the middle of the Yangtze basin, coinciding roughly with the establishment of the Chu state and the beginning of the Zhou dynasty. Following the southward migrations of Kra and Hlai (Rei/Li) peoples around the 8th century BCE, the Yue (Be-Tai people) started to break away and move to the east coast in the present-day Zhejiang province, in the 6th century BCE, forming the state of Yue and conquering the state of Wu shortly thereafter. According to Chamberlain, Yue people (Be-Tai) began to migrate southwards along the east coast of China to what are now Guangxi, Guizhou and northern Vietnam, after Yue was conquered by Chu around 333 BCE. There the Yue (Be-Tai) formed the polities Xi Ou, which became the Northern Tai and the Luo Yue, which became the Central-Southwestern Tai. However, Pittayaporn (2014), after examining layers of Chinese loanwords in proto-Southwestern Tai and other historical evidence, proposes that the southwestward migration of southwestern Tai-speaking tribes from the modern Guangxi to the mainland of Southeast Asia must have taken place only sometime between the 8th–10th centuries CE, long after 44 CE, when Chinese sources last mentioned Luo Yue in the Red River Delta.

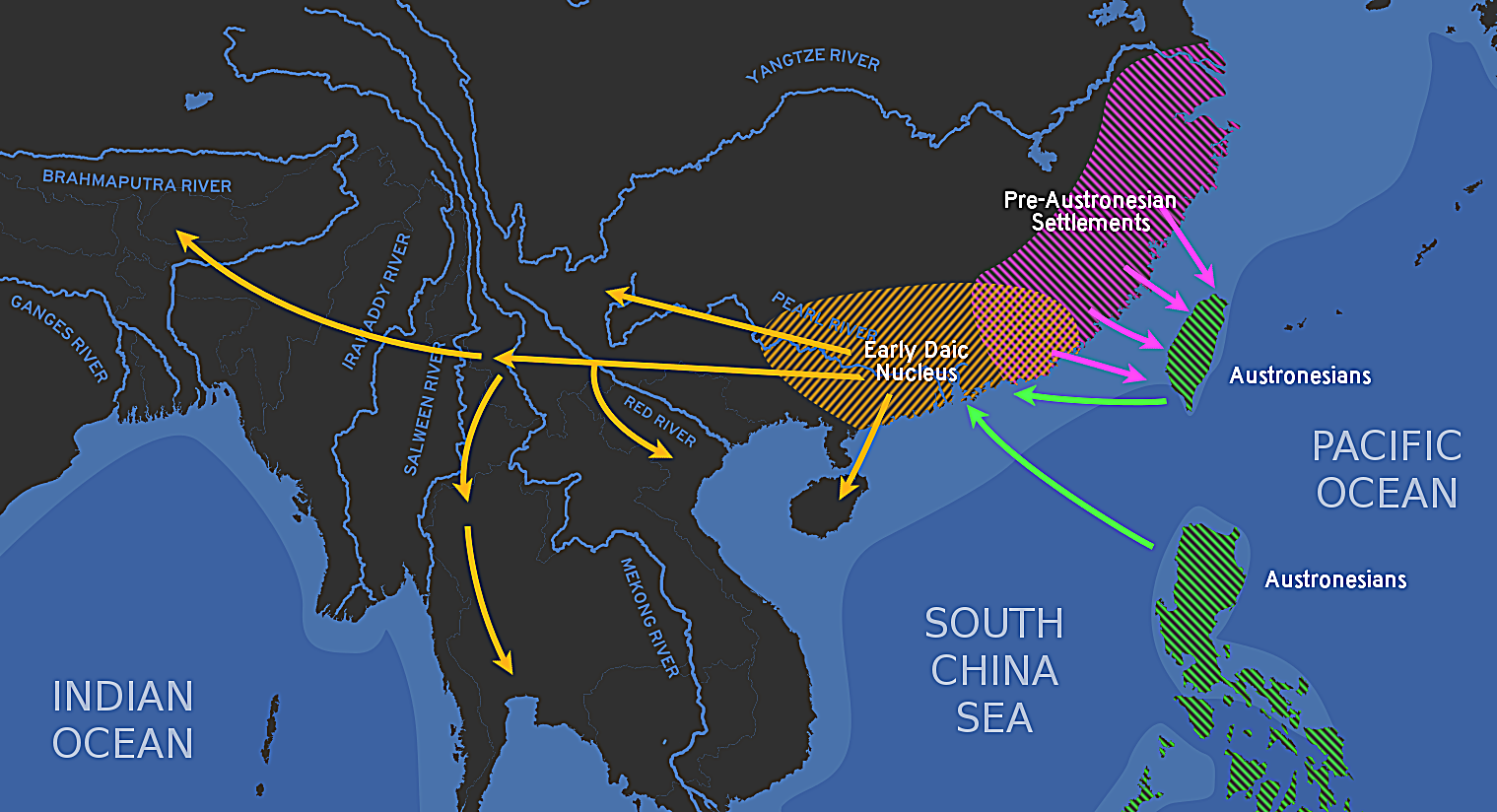
Proposed genesis of Daic languages and their relation with Austronesian languages (Blench, 2018)

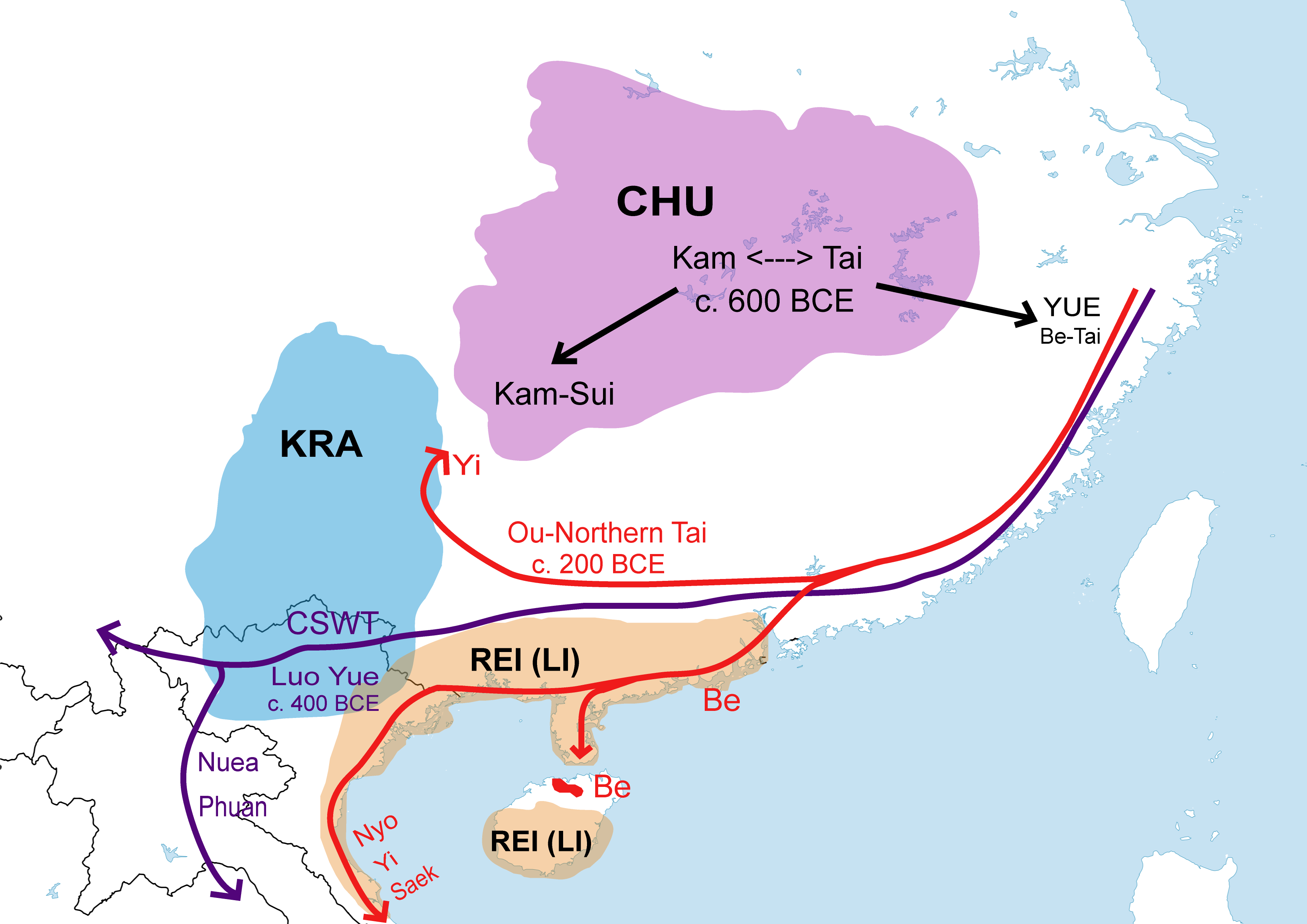
Kra-Dai (Tai-Kadai) migration route according to James R. Chamberlain (2016).

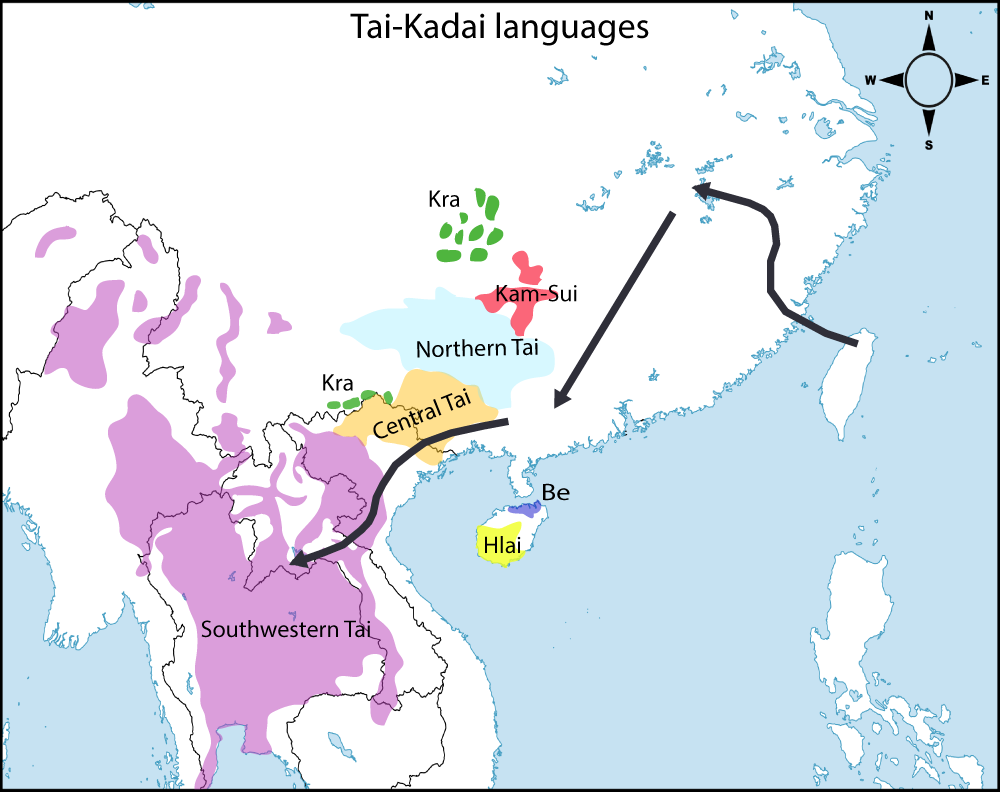
Tai-Kadai migration route according to Matthias Gerner's Northeast to Southwest Hypothesis.

==== Ancient textual evidence ====
In the early 1980s, Zhuang linguist, Wei Qingwen (韦庆稳), electrified the scholarly community in Guangxi by identifying the language in the "Song of the Yue Boatman" as a language ancestral to Zhuang. Wei used reconstructed Old Chinese for the characters and discovered that the resulting vocabulary showed strong resemblance to modern Zhuang. Later, Zhengzhang Shangfang (1991) followed Wei’s insight but used Thai script for comparison, since this orthography dates from the 13th century and preserves archaisms relative to the modern pronunciation. Zhengzhang notes that 'evening, night, dark' bears the C tone in Wuming Zhuang xam^{C2} and ɣam^{C2} 'night'. The item raa normally means 'we inclusive' but in some places, e.g. Tai Lue and White Tai 'I'. However, Laurent Sagart criticizes Zhengzhang's interpretation as anachronistic, because however archaic that Thai script is, Thai language was only written 2000 years after the song had been recorded; even if the Proto-Kam-Tai might have emerged by 6th century BCE, its pronunciation would have been substantially different from Thai. The following is a simplified interpretation of the "Song of the Yue Boatman" by Zhengzhang Shangfang quoted by David Holm (2013) with Thai script and Chinese glosses being omitted: (Note: The upper row represents the original text, the next row the Old Chinese pronunciation, the third a transcription of written Thai, and the fourth line English glosses. Finally, there is Zhengzhang's English translation.)

濫 兮 抃 草 濫
ɦgraams ɦee brons tshuuʔ ɦgraams
glamx ɦee blɤɤn {cɤɤ, cɤʔ} glamx
evening PTCL joyful {to meet} evening
Oh, the fine night, we meet in happiness tonight!

予 昌 {枑 澤} 予 昌 州
la {thjang < khljang} {gaah draag} la thjang {tju < klju}
raa djaangh {kraʔ - ʔdaak} raa djaangh cɛɛu
{we, I} {be apt to} {shy, ashamed} {we, I} {be good at} {to row}
I am so shy, ah! I am good at rowing.

州 𩜱 州 焉 乎 秦 {胥 胥}
tju khaamʔ tju jen faak dzin {sai jai}
cɛɛu khaamx cɛɛu jɤɤnh faak djɯɯnh {sai jaiʔ}
{to row} {to cross} {to row} slowly deposit joy {into heart}
Rowing slowly across the river, ah! I am so pleased!

縵 予 乎 昭 澶 秦 踰
moons la haak {tjau < kljau} daans dzin lo
mɔɔm raa haak caux daanh djin ruux
{dirty, ragged} {we, I} if prince {Your Excellency} acquainted know
Dirty though I am, ah! I made acquaintance with your highness the Prince.

滲 惿 隨 河 湖
srɯms {djeʔ < gljeʔ} sɦloi gaai gaa
zumh jaï cua ha huan
{to hide} heart {forever, constantly} {to search} {to yearn}
Hidden forever in my heart, ah! is my adoration and longing.

Some scattered non-Sinitic words found in the two ancient Chinese fictional texts, the Mu Tianzi Zhuan (Chinese: 穆天子傳) (4th c. B.C.) and the Yuejue shu (Chinese: 越絕書) (1st c. A.D.), can be compared to lexical items in Kra-Dai languages. These two texts are only preserved in corrupt versions and share a rather convoluted editorial history. Wolfgang Behr (2002) makes an attempt to identify the origins of those words:

- "吳謂善「伊」, 謂稻道「緩」, 號從中國, 名從主人。"

“The Wú say yī for ‘good’ and huăn for ‘way’, i.e. in their titles they follow the central kingdoms, but in their names they follow their own lords.”

伊 yī < ʔjij < *^{b}q(l)ij ← Siamese dii^{A1}, Longzhou dai^{1}, Bo'ai nii^{1} Daiya li^{1}, Sipsongpanna di^{1}, Dehong li^{6} < proto-Tai *ʔdɛi^{A1} | Sui ʔdaai^{1}, Kam laai^{1}, Maonan ʔdaai^{1}, Mak ʔdaai^{6} < proto-Kam-Sui/proto-Kam-Tai *ʔdaai^{1} 'good' || proto-Malayo-Polynesian *bait

緩 [huăn] < hwanX < *^{a}wan ← Siamese hon^{A1}, Bo'ai hɔn^{1}, Dioi thon^{1} < proto-Tai *xron^{A1}| Sui khwən^{1}-i, Kam khwən^{1}, Maonan khun^{1}-i, Mulam khwən^{1}-i < proto-Kam-Sui *khwən^{1} 'road, way' | proto-Hlai *kuun^{1} || proto-Austronesian *Zalan (Thurgood 1994:353)

- yuè jué shū 越絕書 (The Book of Yuè Records), 1st c. A.D.

絕 jué < dzjwet < *^{b}dzot ← Siamese cod^{D1} 'to record, mark' (Zhengzhang Shangfang 1999:8)

- "姑中山者越銅官之山也, 越人謂之銅, 「姑[沽]瀆」。"

“The Middle mountains of Gū are the mountains of the Yuè’s bronze office, the Yuè people call them ‘Bronze gū[gū]dú.”

「姑[沽]瀆」 gūdú < ku=duwk < *^{a}ka=^{a}lok

← Siamese kʰau^{A1} 'horn', Daiya xau^{5}, Sipsongpanna xau^{1}, Dehong xau^{1}, Lü xău^{1}, Dioi kaou^{1} 'mountain, hill' < proto-Tai *kʰau^{A2}; Siamese luuk^{D2l} 'classifier for mountains', Siamese kʰau^{A1}-luuk^{D2l} 'mountain' || cf. OC 谷 gǔ < kuwk << *^{a}k-lok/luwk < *^{a}kə-lok/yowk < *^{b}lok 'valley'

- "越人謂船爲「須盧」。"

"... The Yuè people call a boat xūlú. (‘beard’ & ‘cottage’)"

須 xū < sju < *^{b}s(n)o

? ← Siamese saʔ 'noun prefix'

盧 lú < lu < *^{b}ra

← Siamese rɯa^{A2}, Longzhou lɯɯ^{2}, Bo'ai luu^{2}, Daiya hə^{2}, Dehong hə^{2} 'boat' < proto-Tai *drɯ[a,o] | Sui lwa^{1}/ʔda^{1}, Kam lo^{1}/lwa^{1}, Be zoa < proto-Kam-Sui *s-lwa(n)^{A1} 'boat'

- "[劉]賈築吳市西城, 名曰「定錯」城。"

"[Líu] Jiă (the king of Jīng 荆) built the western wall, it was called dìngcuò ['settle(d)' & 'grindstone'] wall."

定 dìng < dengH < *^{a}deng-s

← Siamese diaaŋ^{A1}, Daiya tʂhəŋ^{2}, Sipsongpanna tseŋ^{2}, Malay (Austronesian) dindiŋ^{2}, Tagalog diŋdiŋ^{2} wall

錯 cuò < tshak < *^{a}tshak

? ← Siamese tok^{D1s} 'to set→sunset→west' (tawan-tok 'sun-set' = 'west'); Longzhou tuk^{7}, Bo'ai tɔk^{7}, Daiya tok^{7}, Sipsongpanna tok^{7} < proto-Tai *tok^{D1s} ǀ Sui tok^{7}, Mak tok^{7}, Maonan tɔk < proto-Kam-Sui *tɔk^{D1}, Malay (Austronesian) suntuk running out of time

==== Substrate in modern Chinese languages ====
Besides a limited number of lexical items left in Chinese historical texts, remnants of language(s) spoken by the ancient Yue can be found in non-Han substrata in Southern Chinese dialects, e.g.: Wu, Min, Hakka, Yue, etc. Robert Bauer (1987) identifies twenty seven lexical items in Yue, Hakka and Min varieties, which share Kra–Dai roots. The following are some examples cited from Bauer (1987):

- to beat, whip: Yue-Guangzhou faak^{7a} ← Wuming Zhuang fa:k^{8}, Siamese faat^{D2L}, Longzhou faat, Po-ai faat.
- to beat, pound: Yue-Guangzhou tap^{8} ← Siamese thup^{4}/top^{2}, Longzhou tup^{D1}, Po-ai tup^{3}/tɔp^{D1}, Mak/Dong tap^{D2}, Tai Nuea top^{5}, Sui-Lingam tjăp^{D2}, Sui-Jungchiang tjăp^{D2}, Sui-Pyo tjăp^{D2}, T'en tjap^{D2}, White Tai tup^{4}, Red Tai tup^{3}, Shan thup^{5}, Lao Nong Khai thip^{3}, Lue Moeng Yawng tup^{5}, Leiping-Zhuang thop^{5}/top^{4}, Western Nung tup^{4}, Yay tup^{5}, Saek thap^{6}, Tai Lo thup^{3}, Tai Maw thup^{3}, Tai No top^{5}, Wuming Zhuang tup^{8}, Li-Jiamao tap^{8}.
- to bite: Yue-Guangzhou khap^{8} ← Siamese khop^{2}, Longzhou khoop^{5}, Po-ai hap^{3}, Ahom khup, Shan khop^{4}, Lü khop, White Tai khop^{2}, Nung khôp, Hsi-lin hap^{D2S}, Wuming-Zhuang hap^{8}, T'ien-pao hap, Black Tai khop^{2}, Red Tai khop^{3}, Lao Nong Khai khop^{1}, Western Nung khap^{6}, etc.
- to burn: Yue-Guangzhou naat^{7a}, Hakka nat^{8} ← Wuming Zhuang na:t^{8}, Po-ai naat^{D1L} "hot".
- child: Min-Chaozhou noŋ^{1} kiā^{3} "child", Min-Suixi nuŋ^{3} kia^{3}, Mandarin-Chengdu nɑŋ^{1} pɑ^{1} kər^{1} "youngest sibling", Min-Fuzhou nauŋ^{6} "young, immature" ← Siamese nɔɔŋ^{4}, Tai Lo lɔŋ^{3}, Tai Maw nɔŋ^{3}, Tai No nɔŋ^{3} "younger sibling", Wuming Zhuang tak^{8} nu:ŋ^{4}, Longzhou no:ŋ^{4} ba:u^{5}, Buyi nuaŋ^{4}, Dai-Xishuangbanna nɔŋ^{4} tsa:i^{2}, Dai-Dehong lɔŋ^{4} tsa:i^{2}, etc.
- correct, precisely, just now: Yue-Guangzhou ŋaam^{1} "correct", ŋaam^{1} ŋaam^{1} "just now", Hakka-Meixian ŋam^{5} ŋam^{5} "precisely", Hakka-Youding ŋaŋ^{1} ŋaŋ^{1} "just right", Min-Suixi ŋam^{1} "fit", Min-Chaozhou ŋam^{1}, Min-Hainan ŋam^{1} ŋam^{1} "good" ← Wuming Zhuang ŋa:m^{1} "proper" / ŋa:m^{3} "precisely, appropriate" / ŋa:m^{5} "exactly", Longzhou ŋa:m^{5} vəi^{6}.
- to cover (1): Yue-Guangzhou hom^{6}/ham^{6} ← Siamese hom^{2}, Longzhou hum^{5}, Po-ai hɔm^{B1}, Lao hom, Ahom hum, Shan hom^{2}, Lü hum, White Tai hum^{2}, Black Tai hoom^{2}, Red Tai hom^{3}, Nung hôm, Tay hôm, Tho hoom, T'ien-pao ham, Dioi hom, Hsi-lin hɔm, T'ien-chow hɔm, Lao Nong Khai hom^{3}, Western Nung ham^{2}, etc.
- to cover (2): Yue-Guangzhou khap^{7}, Yue-Yangjiang kap^{7a}, Hakka-Meixian khɛp^{7}, Min-Xiamen kaˀ^{7}, Min-Quanzhou kaˀ^{7}, Min-Zhangzhou kaˀ^{7} "to cover" ← Wuming-Zhuang kop^{8} "to cover", Li-Jiamao khɔp^{7}, Li-Baocheng khɔp^{7}, Li-Qiandui khop^{9}, Li-Tongshi khop^{7} "to cover".
- to lash, whip, thrash: Yue-Guangzhou fit^{7} ← Wuming Zhuang fit^{8}, Li-Baoding fi:t^{7}.
- monkey: Yue-Guangzhou ma^{4} lau^{1} ← Wuming Zhuang ma^{4} lau^{2}, Mulao mə^{6} lau^{2}.
- to slip off, fall off, lose: Yue-Guangzhou lat^{7}, Hakka lut^{7}, Hakka-Yongding lut^{7}, Min-Dongshandao lut^{7}, Min-Suixi lak^{8}, Min-Chaozhou luk^{7} ← Siamese lut^{D1S}, Longzhou luut, Po-ai loot, Wiming-Zhuang lo:t^{7}.
- to stamp foot, trample: Yue-Guangzhou tam^{6}, Hakka tem^{5} ← Wuming Zhuang tam^{6}, Po-ai tam^{B2}, Lao tham, Lü tam, Nung tam.
- stupid: Yue-Guangzhou ŋɔŋ^{6}, Hakka-Meixian ŋɔŋ^{5}, Hakka-Yongfing ŋɔŋ^{5}, Min-Dongshandao goŋ^{6}, Min-Suixi ŋɔŋ^{1}, Min-Fuzhou ŋouŋ^{6} ← Be-Lingao ŋən^{2}, Wuming Zhuang ŋu:ŋ^{6}, Li-Baoding ŋaŋ^{2}, Li-Zhongsha ŋaŋ^{2}, Li-Xifan ŋaŋ^{2}, Li-Yuanmen ŋaŋ^{4}, Li-Qiaodui ŋaŋ^{4}, Li-Tongshi ŋaŋ^{4}, Li-Baocheng ŋa:ŋ^{2}, Li-Jiamao ŋa:ŋ^{2}.
- to tear, pinch, peel, nip: Yue-Guangzhou mit^{7} "tear, break off, pinch, peel off with finger", Hakka met^{7} "pluck, pull out, peel" ← Be-Lingao mit^{5} "rip, tear", Longzhou bit^{D1S}, Po-ai mit, Nung bêt, Tay bit "pick, pluck, nip off", Wuming Zhuang bit^{7} "tear off, twist, peel, pinch, squeeze, press", Li-Tongshi mi:t^{7}, Li-Baoding mi:t^{7} "pinch, squeeze, press".

===== Substrate in Cantonese =====
Yue-Hashimoto describes the Yue Chinese languages spoken in Guangdong as having a Tai influence. Robert Bauer (1996) points out twenty nine possible cognates between Cantonese spoken in Guangzhou and Kra–Dai, of which seven cognates are confirmed to originate from Kra–Dai sources:

- Cantonese 雞項 kɐj^{1} hɔ:ŋ^{2} ← Wuming Zhuang kai^{5} ha:ŋ^{6} "young chicken which has not laid eggs"
- Cantonese ja:ŋ^{5} ← Siamese jâ:ŋ "to step on, tread"
- Cantonese 冚 kɐm^{6} ← Wuming Zhuang kam^{6}, Siamese kʰòm, Be-Lingao xɔm^{4} "to press down or suppress"
- Cantonese 蛤乸 kɐp^{7b} na:^{3} (Note: The second syllable na:^{3} may correspond to Tai morpheme for 'field'.) ← Wuming Zhuang kop^{7}, Siamese kòp "frog"
- Cantonese 及 khɐp^{8} ← Siamese kʰòp "to bite"
- Cantonese 冧 lɐm^{5} ← Siamese lóm, Maonan lam^{5} "to collapse, to topple, to fall down (building)"
- Cantonese tɐm^{5} ← Wuming Zhuang tam^{5}, Siamese tàm "to hang down, be low"

===== Substrate in Wu Chinese =====
Li Hui (2001) finds 126 Kra-Dai cognates in Maqiao Wu dialect spoken in the suburbs of Shanghai out of more than a thousand lexical items surveyed. According to the author, these cognates are likely traces of the Old Yue language. The two tables below show lexical comparisons between Maqiao Wu dialect and Kra-Dai languages quoted from Li Hui (2001). He notes that, in Wu dialect, final consonants such as -m, -ɯ, -i, ụ, etc don't exist, and therefore, -m in Maqiao dialect tends to become -ŋ or -n, or it's simply absent, and in some cases -m even becomes final glottal stop.

Kra-Dai	Maqiao Wu dialect	Gloss
-m , -n become -ŋ
tam^{33} (Zhuang)	təŋ^{354}	step 跺
fa:n^{31} (Sui)	fəŋ^{55} du^{53}	snore/to snore 鼾
ɕam^{21} (Zhuang)	pəʔ^{33} ɕhaŋ^{435}	to have fun (游) 玩
final consonant/vowel missing
va:n^{31}li^{55} (Zhuang)	ɑ:^{31} li^{33}	still, yet 尚；还
tsai^{55} (Zhuang)	tsɔ:^{435}	to plow 犁(地)
thaŋ^{55} (Dai)	dᴇ^{354}	hole/pit 坑
hai^{21} (Zhuang)	hɑ^{53}	filth 污垢
za:n^{11} (Bouyei)	ɕhy^{55} zᴇ^{53}	building/room 房子
kăi^{13} (Dai)	kᴇ^{435}	to draw close to 靠拢
fɤŋ^{13} (Dai)	fɛ^{435}	to sway/to swing 摆动
ɕa:ŋ^{33} (Bouyei)	ɕhɑ^{55} tsɑ^{53}	capable/competent 能干
tjeu^{44} (Maonan)	thɛ^{435}	to crawl 爬
becoming final glottal stop -ʔ
loŋ^{21} (Zhuang)	lɔʔ^{33}	below/down 下(雨)
kem^{55} (Zhuang)	tɕiʔ^{33} ku^{53}	cheek 腮
kam^{33} (Zhuang)	kheʔ^{55}	to press 按
kau^{33} son^{213} (Lingao)	khəʔ^{55} tɕoŋ^{55}	to doze/to nap 瞌睡
tɯ^{11} (Bouyei)	ʔdəʔ^{55}	end/extremity 端
ka:u^{11} (Bouyei)	kuaʔ^{55}	to split/to crack 裂
peu^{55} (Sui)	pəʔ^{33} ɕaŋ^{435}	to have fun(游)玩

Kra-Dai	Maqiao Wu dialect	Gloss
-m , -n become -ŋ
kam^{11} (Dai)	kaŋ^{354}	to prop up/to brace 撑住
tsam^{13} (Sui)	tshoŋ^{53}	to bow the head 低头
final consonant/vowel missing
ve:n^{55} (Zhuang)	ve:^{55}	to hang/to suspend 悬挂；吊
lɒi^{55} (Dai)	lu^{354}	mountain/hill 山(地名用)
xun—^{55} (Dai) ha:k^{55} (Zhuang)	xɔ^{55} lɔ^{53}	government official/official 官
məu^{53} (Dong)	nɑ^{55} mo^{53}	tadpole 蝌蚪
pai^{21} (Zhuang)	pɛ^{435} fu^{53}	classifier for times 趟；次
la:m^{33} (Zhuang)	lɛ^{435}	to tie up 拴(牛)
tsam^{33} (Sui)	tsɿ^{55}	to bow the head 低头
(ɣa:i^{42}) ɕa:i^{42} (Zhuang)	ɕɑ:^{354}	very, quite, much 很
becoming final glottal stop -ʔ
sa:ŋ^{33} səu^{53} (Dong)	seʔ^{33} zo^{55} ɦɯ^{11}	wizard/magician 巫师
tɕe^{31} (Bouyei)	tɕiʔ^{55} ɕhiŋ^{55}	market/bazaar 集市
pleu^{55} (Zhuang)	pəʔ^{33}	to move 搬
wen^{55} (Dong)	veʔ^{33}	to pour 倒(水)
thăi^{55} (Dai)	theʔ^{55}	to weed 耘
ta^{55} jɯ^{55} (Dai)	teʔ^{55}	to narrow one's eyes 眯
lom^{24} (Zhuang)	lɔʔ^{33} nɒn^{35}	pitfall/to sink 陷
ɣa:i^{42} (ɕa:i^{42}) (Zhuang)	ʔɔʔ^{55}	very/quite/much 很
tom^{13} (Dai)	thoʔ^{55}	to cook/to boil 煮(肉)

Dialect	Example word(s)	Meaning
Cantonese	呢 / 嗰 (ni / go2)	this / that
Cantonese	度 (dou6)	place
Cantonese	嘥 (saai1)	to waste
Cantonese	踎 (mau4)	to squat
Cantonese	呃 (aak1)	to deceive
Cantonese	曱甴 (gaat6 zaat6)	cockroach
Cantonese	蛤乸 (gaap6 naa5)	frog
Cantonese	啱 (ngaam1)	just right
Min	虼蠽	cockroach
Min	蚼蚁	ant
Min	交懔损	to shiver (with cold)
Min	著咳嗾	to choke (on smoke/dust)
Min	查埔 / 查某 (tsa-poo / tsa-bóo)	man / woman
Min	某 (bóo)	wife
Min	叨位 (to-ūi)	where
Min	古锥 (kóo-tuinn)	cute
Wu	厘儿	a small amount
Wu	薸 (bieu)	duckweed
Hakka	ni	this
Gan	扤 (wut)	to do / to make / to mess with

=== Austroasiatic arguments ===
Jerry Norman and Mei Tsu-lin presented evidence that at least some Yue spoke an Austroasiatic language:

- A well-known loanword into Sino-Tibetan is k-la for tiger (Hanzi: 虎; Old Chinese (ZS): *qʰlaːʔ > Mandarin pinyin: hǔ, Sino-Vietnamese hổ) from Proto-Austroasiatic *kalaʔ (compare Vietic *k-haːlʔ > kʰaːlʔ > Vietnamese khái and Muong khảl).
- The early Chinese name for the Yangtze (Chinese: 江; pinyin: jiāng; EMC: kœ:ŋ; OC: *kroŋ; Cantonese: "kong") was later extended to a general word for "river" in south China. Norman and Mei suggest that the word is cognate with Vietnamese sông (from *krong) and Mon kruŋ "river".

They also provide evidence of an Austroasiatic substrate in the vocabulary of Min Chinese. For example:

- *-dəŋ^{A} "shaman" may be compared with Vietnamese đồng (/ɗoŋ^{2}/) "to shamanize, to communicate with spirits" and Mon doŋ "to dance (as if) under demonic possession".
- *kiɑn^{B} 囝 "son" appears to be related to Vietnamese con (/kɔn/) and Mon kon "child".

Norman and Mei's hypothesis has been criticized by Laurent Sagart, who demonstrates that many of the supposed loan words can be better explained as archaic Chinese words, or even loans from Austronesian languages; he also argues that the Vietic cradle must be located farther south in current north Vietnam.

- Norman & Mei also compares Min verb "to know, to recognize" 捌 (Proto-Min *pat; whence Fuzhou /paiʔ˨˦/ & Amoy /pat̚˧˨/) to Vietnamese biết, also meaning "to know, to recognize". However, Sagart contends that the Min & Vietnamese sense "to know, to recognize" is semantically extended from well-attested Chinese verb 別 "to distinguish, discriminate, differentiate" ((Mandarin: bié; MC: /bˠiɛt̚/; OC: *bred); thus Sagart considers Vietnamese biết as a loanword from Chinese.
- According to the Shuowen Jiezi (100 AD), "In Nanyue, the word for dog is (Chinese: 撓獀; pinyin: náosōu; EMC: nuw-ʂuw)", possibly related to other Austroasiatic terms. Sōu is "hunt" in modern Chinese. However, in Shuowen Jiezi, the word for dog is also recorded as 獶獀 with its most probable pronunciation around 100 CE must have been *ou-sou, which resembles proto-Austronesian *asu, *u‑asu 'dog' than it resembles the palatal‑initialed Austroasiatic monosyllable Vietnamese chó, Old Mon clüw, etc.
- Zheng Xuan (127–200 AD) wrote that 扎 (Middle Chinese: /t͡ʃˠat̚/, modern Mandarin Chinese zā, modern Sino-Vietnamese: "trát") was the word used by the Yue people (越人) to mean "die". Norman and Mei reconstruct this word as OC *tsət and relate it to Austroasiatic words with the same meaning, such as Vietnamese chết and Mon chɒt. However, Laurent Sagart points out that 扎 is a well‑attested Chinese word also meaning "to die", which is overlooked by Norman and Mei. That this word occurred in the Old Yue language in Han times could be because the Old Yue language borrowed it from Chinese. Therefore, the resemblance of this Chinese word to an Austroasiatic word is probably accidental.
- According to Sagart, the resemblance between the Min word *-dəŋ^{A} "shaman" or "spirit healer" and the Vietnamese term đồng is undoubtedly by chance.

Moreover, Chamberlain (1998) posits that the Austroasiatic predecessor of the modern Vietnamese language originated in modern-day Bolikhamsai Province and Khammouane Province in Laos as well as parts of Nghệ An Province and Quảng Bình Province in Vietnam, rather than in the region north of the Red River Delta. However, Ferlus (2009) showed that the inventions of pestle, oar and a pan to cook sticky rice, which is the main characteristic of the Đông Sơn culture, correspond to the creation of new lexicons for these inventions in Northern Vietic (Việt–Mường) and Central Vietic (Cuoi-Toum). The new vocabularies of these inventions were proven to be derivatives from original verbs rather than borrowed lexical items. The current distribution of Northern Vietic also correspond to the area of Đông Sơn culture. Thus, Ferlus concludes that the Northern Vietic (Viet-Muong) speakers are the "most direct heirs" of the Dongsonians, who have resided in Southern part of Red River Delta and North Central Vietnam since the 1st millennium BC. In addition, archaeogenetics demonstrated that before the Dong Son period, the Red River Delta's inhabitants were predominantly Austroasiatic: genetic data from Phùng Nguyên culture's burial site (dated to 1,800 BCE) at Mán Bạc (in present-day Ninh Bình Province, Vietnam) have close proximity to modern Austroasiatic speakers, while "mixed genetics" from Đông Sơn culture's Núi Nấp site showed affinity to "Dai from China, Tai-Kadai speakers from Thailand, and Austroasiatic speakers from Vietnam, including the Kinh"; these results indicated that significant contact happened between Tai speakers and Vietic speakers.

Ye (2014) identified a few Austroasiatic loanwords in Ancient Chu dialect of Old Chinese.

== Writing system ==
There is no known evidence of a writing system among the Yue peoples of the Lingnan region in pre-Qin times, and the Chinese conquest of the region is believed to have introduced writing to the area. However, Liang Tingwang, a professor from the Central University of Nationalities, said that the ancient Zhuang had their own proto-writing system but had to give it up because of the Qinshi Emperor's tough policy and to adopt the Han Chinese writing system, which ultimately developed into the old Zhuang demotic script alongside the classical Chinese writing system, during the Tang dynasty (618–907).

== Sources ==
- Alves, Mark (May 2019). Data from Multiple Disciplines Connecting Vietic with the Dong Son Culture (PPTX). Contact Zones and Colonialism in Southeast Asia and China's South (~221 BCE - 1700 CE). Pennsylvania State University. doi:10.13140/RG.2.2.32110.05446.
- Bauer, Robert S. (1996). "Identifying the Tai substratum in Cantonese" (PDF). Proceedings of the Fourth International Symposium on Languages and Linguistics, Pan-Asiatic Linguistics V: 1 806- 1 844. Bangkok: Institute of Language and Culture for Rural Development, Mahidol University at Salaya.
- Behr, Wolfgang (2002). "Stray loanword gleanings from two Ancient Chinese fictional texts". 16e Journées de Linguistique d'Asie Orientale, Centre de Recherches Linguistiques Sur l'Asie Orientale (E.H.E.S.S.), Paris: 1–6.
- Sagart, Laurent (2008). "The expansion of Setaria farmers in East Asia". In Sanchez-Mazas, Alicia; Blench, Roger; Ross, Malcolm D.; Ilia, Peiros; Lin, Marie (eds.). Past human migrations in East Asia: matching archaeology, linguistics and genetics. Routledge. pp. 133–157. ISBN 978-0-415-39923-4. "In conclusion, there is no convincing evidence, linguistic or other, of an early Austroasiatic presence on the southeast China coast."
- Chamberlain, James R. (2016). "Kra-Dai and the Proto-History of South China and Vietnam". Journal of the Siam Society. 104: 27–77.
- Li, Hui (2001). "Daic Background Vocabulary in Shanghai Maqiao Dialect" (PDF). Proceedings for Conference of Minority Cultures in Hainan and Taiwan, Haikou: Research Society for Chinese National History: 15–26. Archived from the original (PDF) on 2018-03-27.
- Edmondson, Jerold A. (2007). "The power of language over the past: Tai settlement and Tai linguistics in southern China and northern Vietnam" (PDF). Studies in Southeast Asian Languages and Linguistics, Jimmy G. Harris, Somsonge Burusphat and James E. Harris, ed. Bangkok, Thailand: Ek Phim Thai Co. LTD.: 1–25. Archived from the original (PDF) on 2014-01-01.
- Holm, David (2013). Mapping the Old Zhuang Character Script: A Vernacular Writing System from Southern China. BRILL. ISBN 978-9-004-22369-1.
- Kiernan, Ben (2019). Việt Nam: a history from earliest time to the present. Oxford University Press. ISBN 978-0-190-05379-6.
- Pittayaporn, Pittayawat (2014). "Layers of Chinese Loanwords in Protosouthwestern Tai as Evidence for the Dating of the Spread of Southwestern Tai" (PDF). MANUSYA: Journal of Humanities. Special Issue No. 20 (3): 47–68. doi:10.1163/26659077-01703004.
- Zhengzhang, Shangfang (1991). "Decipherment of Yue-Ren-Ge (Song of the Yue boatman)". Cahiers de Linguistique Asie Orientale. 20 (2): 159–168. doi:10.3406/clao.1991.1345.
