= Northern Va language =

Austroasiatic language spoken in Yunnan, China

Northern Va
- Pronunciation: [vaʔ˥˩]
- Native to: China
- Region: Jingxing Township, Mojiang Hani Autonomous County, Yunnan
- Native speakers: <2,000 (2014)
- Language family: Austroasiatic: Khasi–Palaungic; Palaungic; Angkuic; Eastern Angkuic; Northern Va

Language codes
- ISO 639-3: None (mis)
- Glottolog: None

Northern Va (Va pronunciation: [tou˥˩wo˨˩vaʔ˥˩] "Va language") is an Austroasiatic language spoken in Yunnan, China. It is classified as an Angkuic language, belongs to the Palaungic branch by Hsiu (2017). No ISO code has been designated for Va.

The relationship between two Va varieties is unclear, as Northern Va informant stated that they cannot understand Southern Va very well, but the Southern Va informant can understand Northern Va perfectly. Southern Va is more conservative compared to Northern Va in sesquisyllabic word structure.

This language was first researched by Simao Prefecture Ethnic Minority Affairs Bureau in 1990.

== Sociolinguistics ==
Northern Va is spoken in a remote pocket deep inside Yunnan, with no other Austroasiatic languages are in sight within a 100 kilometers radius. Its speakers are officially recognized as ethnic Blangs, despite they speak an Angkuic language. The language is used in daily life by all generations, including children.

Northern Va is spoken in about eight villages of Taihe Village 太和村, Jingxing Township 景星乡, Mojiang County, Yunnan.

- Wamo 挖墨 (currently with vigorous language use)
- Xinzhai 新寨 (Upper 上 and Lower 下 hamlets)
- Jiuzhai 旧寨
- Dazhai 大寨 (Upper 上 and Lower 下 hamlets)
- Xiaozhai 小寨 (Upper 上 and Lower 下 hamlets)

Va speakers are surrounded by mostly Kaduo speakers, a Southern Loloish language. However, trace of Tai superstrate is significant, evident in most of Va numbers other than 1-3 have been replaced by Tai loans, even though Tai speakers are a minority in the region.

== Phonology ==
=== Word structure ===
Northern Va is less archaic in comparison to Southern Va in term of preserving the canonical Austroasiatic word shape C(C)VC. Monosyllables tend to dominate the lexicon, though presyllabic clusters /kl-, kʰl-, pl-, pʰl-, pʰj-/ may appears in some lexemes. The maximal structure in Northern Va is C_{1}(C_{2})V(V)(N/C_{f})^{T}.

=== Suprasegmentals (tones) ===
There are four tones in Va. Note that when high-falling tone /51/ is followed by a mid-level /33/ or low-falling tone /21/, there is a contour transition during the phonetic coarticulation which may result as [452] or [451].

Pitch value	Contour	Example
21	low-falling	tsa² "cook"
33	mid-level	ʂɨ³³ "rope, string"
35	mid-rising	fai⁵¹veiʔ³⁵ "left side"
51	high-falling	dʑɯa⁵¹ "know"

=== Consonants ===
No phonemes listed below have been found to exist only as allophones in all environments. /ɲ̥/ is apparently rare, as there is only one example: ɲ̥a⁵¹ 'to laugh'.

==== Onsets ====
Northern Va initial consonants
		Labial	Alveolar		Retroflex	(Alveolo-) Palatal	Velar	Glottal
		Labial	central	sibilant	Retroflex	(Alveolo-) Palatal	Velar	Glottal
Plosive	plain	p	t	t͡s		t͡ɕ	k	ʔ
Plosive	aspirated	pʰ	tʰ	t͡sʰ		t͡ɕʰ	kʰ	
Plosive	voiced					d͡ʑ		
Fricative	voiceless	f	ɬ	s	ʂ	ɕ	x	h
Fricative	voiced	v				ʑ	ɣ	
Nasal	voiceless	m̥	n̥			ȵ̥	ŋ̥	
Nasal	voiced	m	n			ȵ	ŋ	
Approximant		w	l					

==== Codas ====
Northern Va codas
	Bilabial	Alveolar	Palatal	Velar	Glottal
Plosive	p	t		k	ʔ
Nasal	m	n		ŋ	
Glide	u̯		i̯		

=== Vowels ===
Northern Va monophthongs
	Front	Central	Back
High	i ĩ	ɨ ɨ̃ ɯ ɯ̃	u ũ
Mid-high	e ẽ	ɤ ɤ̃	o õ
Low		a ã	

- /a/ has an allophone of [ɑ].
- /ɤ/ has an allophone of [ə]. [ɤ] may have a front quality.
- Six diphthongs /ɯa ui ei ɤi ie ou/ all can be nasalized.

== Lexicon ==
=== Pronouns ===
	singular	plural
1st person	ʔo³³	ʔei³³
2nd person	mi³³	pʰei³³
3rd person	tʰa³³	kei⁵¹

=== Numerals ===
Note: loan words are not displayed.

Gloss	Northern Va	Proto-Eastern Angkuic	proto-Palaungic
1	tiʔ³³ (hand)		*moːh
2	kɑ⁵¹		*ləʔaːr
3	kui⁵¹	**kuej	*ləʔɔːj
4	(Tai loan)		*poːn
5	–		*pəsan
6	–		*tɔːl
7	–		*təpuːl
8	–		*taːʔ
9	–		*tiːm
10	–		*kɤːl
100	tiʔ³³pɑk⁵¹		*prjah
1000	tiʔ³³ɕin⁵¹		*sreːŋ

=== Flora & colors ===
Gloss	Northern Va	proto-Palaungic
black	laŋ⁵¹ploŋ⁵¹	*jam, *laŋ
bamboo	ŋum³³xɤŋ⁵¹	*hrəŋ
flower	ɣaŋ⁵¹	*raːŋ
fruit	pʰli²¹vei³³	*pleeʔ
green/blue	vei²¹ŋ̥ia³³	**sŋaal; *ɲ(ɛ/iə)r
leaf	ɬa²¹siʔ³³	*hlaʔ
red	ve³³ŋam⁵¹	*rooŋ
rice tree	ŋ̥ou³³	*sŋɔːʔ
millet	sɨ²¹sɨ³³	*skɔɔj
yellow	ve²¹ɬɯ̃⁵¹	*rmiit

=== Fauna ===
Gloss	Northern Va	proto-Palaungic
buffalo	kʰɯaʔ⁵¹	*traːk
bear	kʰɯa⁵¹	*kreːs
bee	sie⁵¹	*psiər
bird	sɨm³³	*ciːm
dog	so³³	*cɔːʔ
goose	haŋ⁵¹	*haan
fowl	ʔie⁵¹	*ʔiɛr
horse	pɯaŋ⁵¹	*mraŋ
louse	tɕʰiŋ²¹ʂɨ³³	*ciːʔ
pig	lik⁵¹	*-leːk
tiger	vai²¹	*rwaaj
