= Tai Ya language =

Tai language of southern China

Tai Ya
- Tai Cung
- Native to: China, Thailand
- Native speakers: (50,000 cited 2000 census)
- Language family: Kra–Dai: Tai; Southwestern (Thai); Northwestern (Shan); Tai Ya
- Writing system: Tai Le script (Yuanyang dialect)

Language codes
- ISO 639-3: cuu
- Glottolog: taiy1242
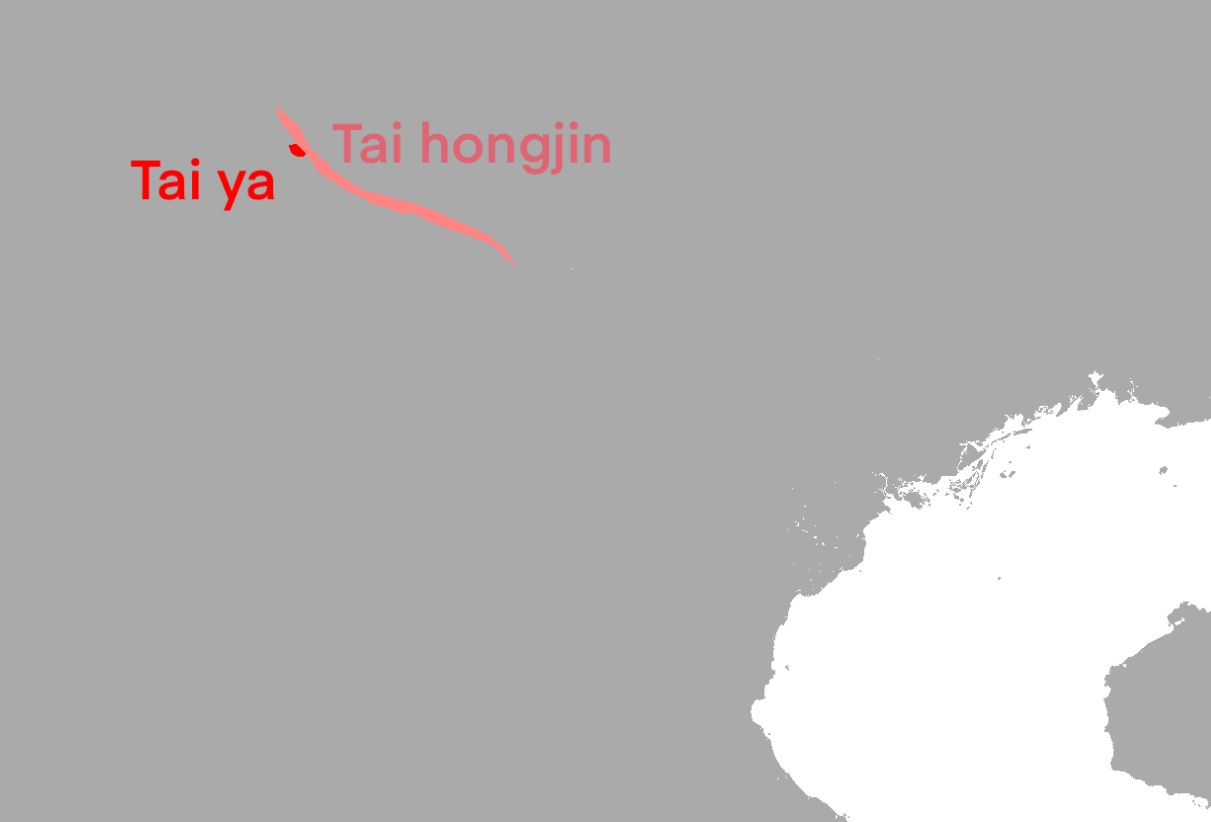

Tai Ya (Chinese: 傣雅语), also known as Tai Cung, Tai Chung and Dai Ya, is a Southwestern Tai language of southern China. It has one dialect, Tai Hongjin (Chinese: 红金傣语); Red Tai.

Speakers of Tai Hongjin live in the Red River (红河 or 元江) and Jinsha River (金沙江) watershed regions of south-central Yunnan. Most are Buddhists, but few are Theravada. It is also spoken by around 5,000–6,000 people in Chiang Rai Province, Thailand.

Unlike other more widely studied Dai languages, Tai Ya has no traditional orthography, though it has a rich oral tradition. Papers have noted that this lack of orthography may endanger the survival of Tai Ya in future generations in Thailand, as the Tai Ya people shift towards the use of Northern Thai and Central Thai, due to the lack of literature in Tai Ya. However, it has been attested that language vitality as a whole (including the majority speakers in Yunnan Province) is high and "likely to be spoken by future generations".

== Dialects ==
Tai Hongjin can be split into five dialects, which are often mutually unintelligible (Zhou 2001:14).

- Yuánxīn 元新 (Yuanyang-Xinping): Honghe County 红河县, Yuanyang County 元阳县 of Honghe Hani and Yi Autonomous Prefecture 红河州; Xinping Yi and Dai Autonomous County 新平彝族傣族自治县 of Yuxi City 玉溪市.
- Yǒngwǔ 永武 (Yongren-Wuding): Yongren County 永仁县, Wuding County 武定县, Lufeng County 禄丰县, Dayao County 大姚县 — all in Chuxiong Yi Autonomous Prefecture 楚雄彝族自治州.
- Mǎguān 马关: Maguan County of Wenshan Prefecture.
- Yuánjiāng 元江: Honghe County 红河县, Yuanyang County 元阳县 of Honghe Prefecture 红河州; Yuanjiang County 元江县 of Yuxi City 玉溪市.
- Lǜshí 绿石 (Lüchun-Shiping): Lüchun County 绿春县, Shiping County 石屏县, Jianshui County 建水县 — all in Honghe Prefecture 红河州. This dialect has more open rimes and nasal finals.

The total number of Tai Hongjin speakers combined is 136,000 (Zhou 2001:14). A related but separate Tai language called Dǎi Jīnpíng (金平傣语) is spoken in Jinping County (金平县), Honghe Prefecture (红河州), which Zhou (2001) reports as having 15,400 speakers. This language has its own traditional script as well (see Zhou 2001:379).

=== Heipu ===
Heipu 黑蒲 (autonym: Kalang 卡郎 kʰa³³lun²¹; also called Baiyi 摆彝 by the Han Chinese) is a variety of Tai Ya (傣雅) spoken by 118 people in the two villages of Shitouzhai (石头寨) and Xiaomiao (小庙) in Panlong Township (盘龙乡), District 5 (五区), Xinping County, Yunnan (You 2013:268). Heipu (黑蒲) is a Han Chinese exonym referring to their practice of teeth blackening. In Xinping County, the Heipu also refer to themselves as the Tai Kha (傣卡) (You 2013:336). It is mutually intelligible with Tai Ya as spoken in District 4 (四区) of Xinping County. However, Heipu is unique in that it has only four tones, and has lost the final stops -p, -t, -k. Heipu is not to be confused with two other groups of the same name:

- Heipu 黑蒲, an ethnic Zhuang group in Lijiang County, Yunnan with a population of 675 (You 2013:55).
- Heipu 黑蒲, an ethnic Bulang group in Mojiang County, Yunnan with the autonym Wa 娃 (You 2013:335-336).

== Phonology ==
=== Consonants ===
==== Yuanyang Dialect ====
		Labial	Alveolar		Palatal	Velar	Glottal
		Labial	plain	sibilant	Palatal	Velar	Glottal
Nasal		m ᥛ	n ᥢ		ɲ ᥭ	ŋ ᥒ	
Plosive/ Affricate	tenuis	p ᥙ	t ᥖ	ts ᥓ		k ᥐ	ʔ ᥟ
Plosive/ Affricate	aspirated	pʰ ᥚ	tʰ ᥗ	tsʰ ᥡ		kʰ ᥠ	
Continuant	voiceless	f ᥜ		s ᥔ		x ᥑ	h ᥞ
Continuant	voiced	v ᥝ	l ᥘ		j ᥕ		

==== Maguan Dialect ====
		Labial	Alveolar		Palatal	Velar	Glottal
		Labial	plain	sibilant	Palatal	Velar	Glottal
Nasal		m	n		ɲ	ŋ	
Plosive/ Affricate	tenuis	p	t	ts		k	ʔ
Plosive/ Affricate	aspirated	pʰ	tʰ	tsʰ		kʰ	
Plosive/ Affricate	voiced	b	d			g	
Continuant	voiceless	f		s		x	h
Continuant	voiced	v	l		j		

==== Wuding Dialect ====
		Labial	Alveolar	Retroflex	Alveolo- palatal	Velar	Glottal
Nasal		m	n		ɲ		
Plosive/ Affricate	tenuis	p	t	ʈʂ	tɕ	k	ʔ
Plosive/ Affricate	aspirated	pʰ	tʰ	ʈʂʰ	tɕʰ	kʰ	
Continuant	voiceless	f	s	ʂ		x	h
Continuant	voiced	v	l	ʐ			

==== Mosha (漠沙镇) Dialect ====
		Labial	Alveolar		Retroflex	(Alveolo-) palatal	Velar	Glottal
		Labial	plain	sibilant	Retroflex	(Alveolo-) palatal	Velar	Glottal
Nasal		m	n			ɲ		
Plosive/ Affricate	tenuis	p	t	ts	ʈʂ	tɕ	k	ʔ
Plosive/ Affricate	aspirated	pʰ	tʰ	tsʰ	ʈʂʰ	tɕʰ	kʰ	
Continuant	voiceless	f		s	ʂ		x	h
Continuant	voiced	v	l			j		

==== Yuanjiang Dialect ====
		Labial	Alveolar		(Alveolo-) palatal	Velar	Glottal
		Labial	plain	sibilant	(Alveolo-) palatal	Velar	Glottal
Nasal		m	n		ɲ		
Plosive/ Affricate	tenuis	p	t	ts		k	ʔ
Plosive/ Affricate	aspirated	pʰ	tʰ	tsʰ		kʰ	
Continuant	voiceless	f	ɬ	s	ɕ	x	h
Continuant	voiced	v	l		j		

== Bibliography ==
- Dawkins, Erin. 2007. A sociolingustic survey of Tai Ya in Thailand Archived 2019-10-10 at the Wayback Machine. Chiang Mai: Payap University.
- Tehan, Thomas M., and Erin Dawkins. 2010. Tai Ya in Thailand Present and Future: Reversing Language Shift Archived 2014-08-10 at the Wayback Machine. Research Project #53-01 in Linguistics Department Research Series, Payap University, Chiangmai, Thailand.
- Xing Gongwan 邢公畹. 1989. Honghe Shangyou Daiyayu 红河上游傣雅语. China: Yuwen.
