= Southern Va language =

Austroasiatic language spoken in Yunnan, China

Southern Va
- Pronunciation: [vaʔ˥˩]
- Native to: China
- Region: Jingxing Township, Mojiang Hani Autonomous County, Yunnan
- Native speakers: <1,000 (2014)
- Language family: Austroasiatic: Khasi–Palaungic; Palaungic; Angkuic; Eastern Angkuic; Southern Va

Language codes
- ISO 639-3: None (mis)
- Glottolog: None

Southern Va is an Austroasiatic language spoken in Yunnan, China. It is classified as an Angkuic language, belongs to the Palaungic branch by Hsiu (2017). No ISO code has been designated for Va.

The relationship between two Va varieties is unclear, as Northern Va informant stated that they cannot understand Southern Va very well, but the Southern Va informant can understand Northern Va perfectly. Southern Va is more conservative compared to Northern Va in sesquisyllabic word structure.

== Sociolinguistics ==
is spoken in the following villages of Zhenglong Village 正龙村, Jingxing Township 景星乡, Mojiang County, Yunnan.

- Pingtian 平田
- Banglao 蚌老 (culture and language best preserved)
- Miena 乜那
- Binggu 丙故
- Yin’gou 阴沟
- Yakou 丫口 (culture and language least preserved)

Southern Va has not been mentioned in any Chinese publications. It is spoken by perhaps under 1,000 people. Unlike Northern Va, Southern Va have no youth speakers. Currently its speakers are almost adults above age 40 and elderly.
