= Song of the Yue Boatman =

Song in unknown language of China from 528 BC

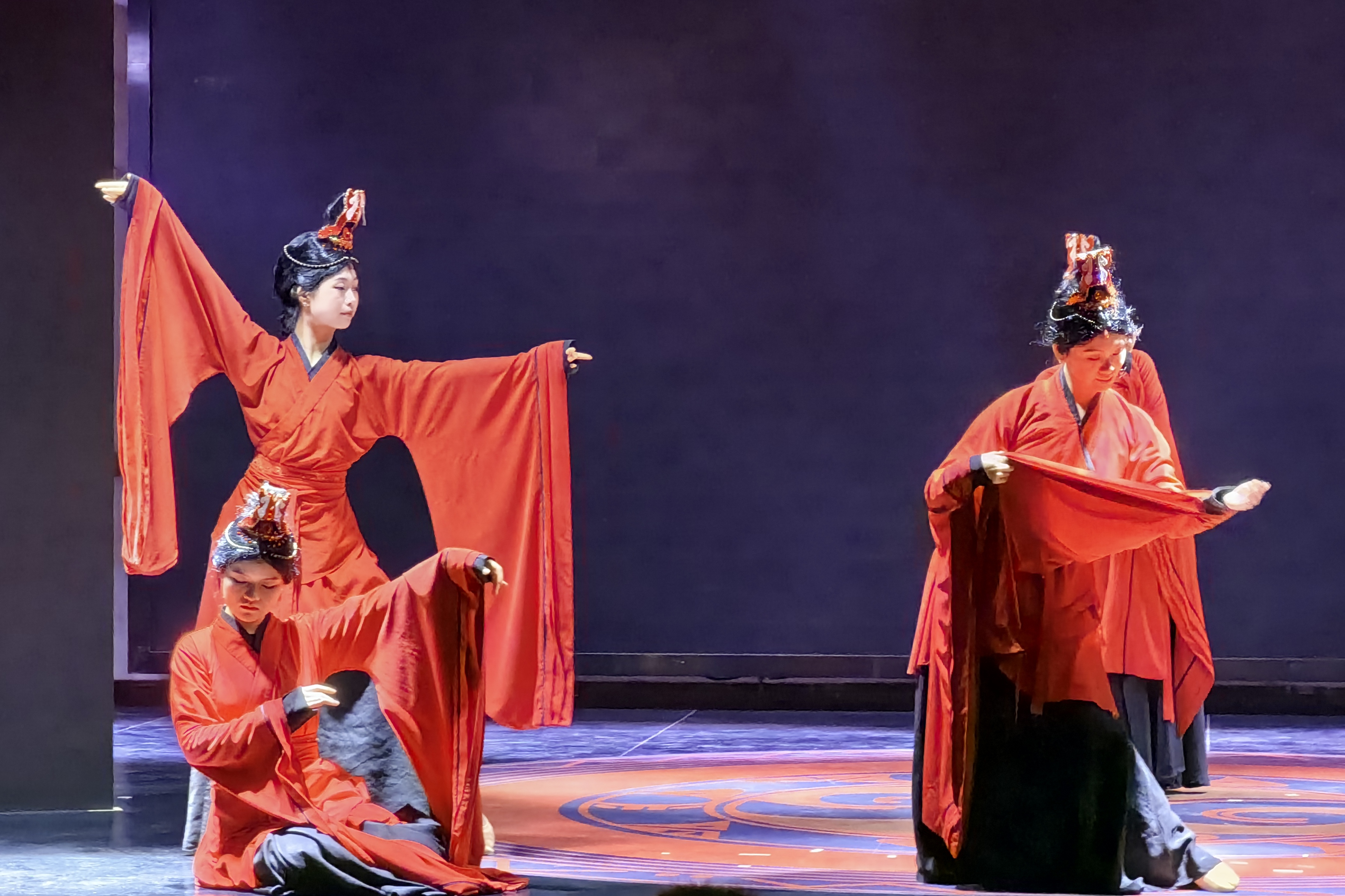
Stage performance of the Song of the Yue Boatman at Yellow Crane Tower Park, Wuhan.

The Song of the Yue Boatman (Chinese: 越人歌; pinyin: Yuèrén Gē; lit. 'Song of the man of Yue') is a short song in an ancient language of southern China in the Yangtze River valley said to have been recorded around 528 BC. A transcription using Chinese characters, together with a Chinese version, is preserved in the Garden of Stories compiled by Liu Xiang five centuries later.

== Setting ==
The song appears in a story within a story in the Shànshuō (善說) chapter of the Garden of Stories. A minister of the state of Chu, who is infatuated with an attractive nobleman, the Lord of Xiangcheng, relates to him an incident in which the 6th-century BC prince Zixi (子晳), the Lord of È (鄂), on an excursion on his state barge, was intrigued by the singing of his Yue boatman, (Note: At that time, "Yue" referred to non-Chinese peoples in the area south of the Yangtze River.) and asked for an interpreter to translate it. It was a song of praise of rural life, expressing the boatman's secret pleasure at knowing the prince:

Chinese version of the song
Text	English translation by Zhengzhang Shangfang	English translation by Stevenson and Wu
今夕何夕兮，	Oh! What night is tonight,	What evening is this
搴舟中流。 (Note: In Shuoyuan's received text, this line reads: 「搴中洲流」; the character 舟 ('boat') is replaced with 洲 ('islet'). There are several other readings; the reading 「搴舟中流」 is from the anthology New Songs from the Jade Terrace.)	we are rowing on the river.	that I take a boat into the stream?
今日何日兮，	Oh! What day is today,	What day is this
得與王子同舟。	that I get to share a boat with a prince	that I share a boat with my prince?
蒙羞被好兮，	The prince's kindness makes me shy,	Shy am I for having taken to you,
不訾詬恥。	I take no notice of people's mocking cries	I fear not the shame of denunciation.
心幾頑而不絕兮，	Ignorant but not uncared for,	My longing is intense and without let,
得知王子。	I made acquaintance with a prince.	with thoughts only for my prince.
山有木兮木有枝，	There are trees on the mountains and there are branches on the tree	The mountains have trees, the trees branches,
心悅君兮君不知。	I adore you, oh! you do not know.	my heart has spoken to my lord, my lord does not understand.

On hearing this, the prince embraced the boatman and covered him with his embroidered coverlet. The minister/narrator goes on to remark: "Zixi, Duke of E, was a brother of the Chu king by the same mother, his administrative position was that of prime minister, his peerage was that of a prince, yet a Yue boatman was able to enjoy intercourse with him to his satisfaction". Thus, the minister convinces Lord of Xiangcheng to let him hold his hand, which he had previously refused upon noticing the minister's feelings.

The story became an emblem of same-sex love in imperial China. For example, it was included in the chapter on love between men in Feng Menglong's anthology Qing Shi (情史, 'History of Love', c. 1628–1630).

== Old Yue text ==
The words of the original song were transcribed in 32 Chinese characters, each representing the sound of a non-Chinese syllable:

濫兮抃草濫予昌枑澤予昌州州𩜱州焉乎秦胥胥縵予乎昭澶秦踰滲惿隨河湖

As with the similarly recorded Pai-lang songs, interpretation is complicated by uncertainty about the sounds of Old Chinese represented by the characters. In 1981, the linguist Wei Qingwen proposed an interpretation by comparing the words of the song with several Tai languages, particularly Zhuang varieties spoken today in Guangxi province. Building on Wei's work, Zhengzhang Shangfang produced a version in written Thai (dating from the late 13th century) as the closest available approximation to the original language, using his own reconstruction of Old Chinese. Both Wei's and Zhengzhang's interpretations correspond loosely to the original 54-character Chinese rendition, and lack counterparts of the third and ninth lines of the Chinese version. Zhengzhang suggests that these lines were added during the composition of the Chinese version to fit the Chu Ci poetic style. Zhengzhang's interpretation remains controversial, both because of the gap of nearly two millennia between the date of the song and written Thai and because Thai belongs to the more geographically distant Southwestern Tai languages.

Qin Xiaohang has argued that although the transcription does not represent a true writing system for the non-Chinese language, such transcription practice formed the basis of the later development of the Sawndip script for Zhuang.
