= Va languages =

Angkuic language pair spoken in China

Va
- Region: Mojiang County, China
- Native speakers: 3,000 (2015)
- Language family: Austroasiatic: Khasi–Palaungic; Palaungic; Angkuic; Eastern Angkuic; Va

Language codes
- ISO 639-3: None (mis)
- Glottolog: east2776

Va is a pair of Angkuic languages spoken in Mojiang Hani Autonomous County, Yunnan, China. Although the Va autonym is vaʔ51, the language is not Wa, and neither does it belong to the Waic language subgroup. Rather, Va constitutes a separate subdivision within the Angkuic languages.

- Northern Va (about 2,000 speakers): spoken in Taihe Administrative Village 太和村, Jingxing Township 景星乡, Mojiang County, Yunnan, China. Northern Va is spoken by all generations, including children.
- Southern Va (about 1,000 speakers): spoken in Zhenglong Administrative Village 正龙村, Jingxing Township 景星乡, Mojiang County, Yunnan, China. Southern Va is more endangered and is not spoken by children, but is also more phonologically conservative.

== Distribution ==
Northern Va is spoken in about eight villages of Taihe Village 太和村, Jingxing Township 景星乡, Mojiang County, Yunnan.

- Wamo 挖墨 (currently with vigorous language use)
- Xinzhai 新寨 (Upper 上 and Lower 下)
- Jiuzhai 旧寨
- Dazhai 大寨 (Upper 上 and Lower 下)
- Xiaozhai 小寨 (Upper 上 and Lower 下)

Southern Va is spoken in the following villages of Zhenglong Village 正龙村, Jingxing Township 景星乡, Mojiang County, Yunnan.

- Pingtian 平田
- Banglao 蚌老 (culture and language best preserved)
- Miena 乜那
- Binggu 丙故
- Yin’gou 阴沟
- Yakou 丫口 (culture and language least preserved)
