= Mojiang Hani Autonomous County =

Mojiang County 墨江县 · Meiqjal xeif
- Autonomous county
- 墨江哈尼族自治县; Meiqjal Haqniqssaq Ziiqziifxeif; Mojiang Hani Autonomous County
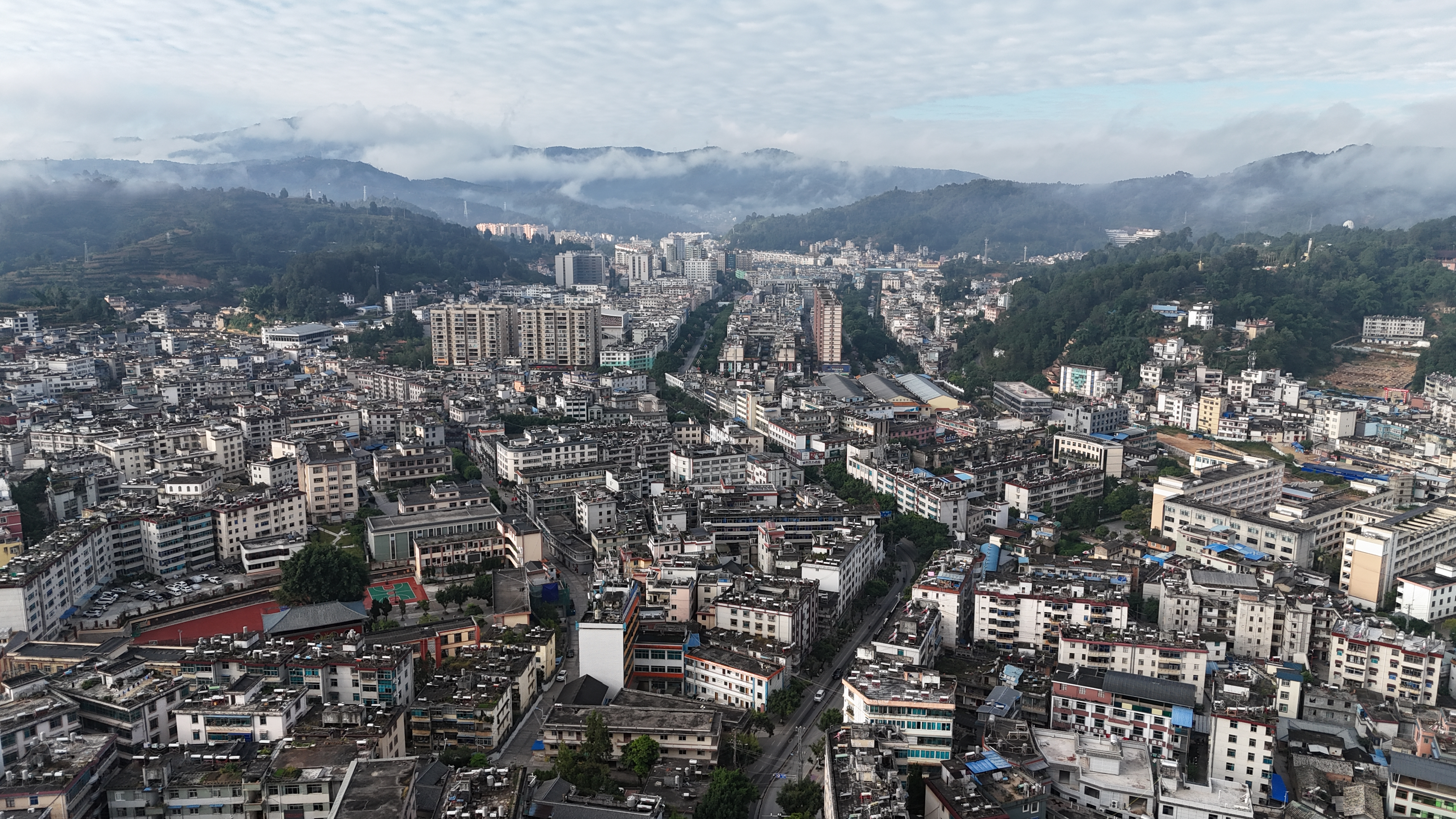
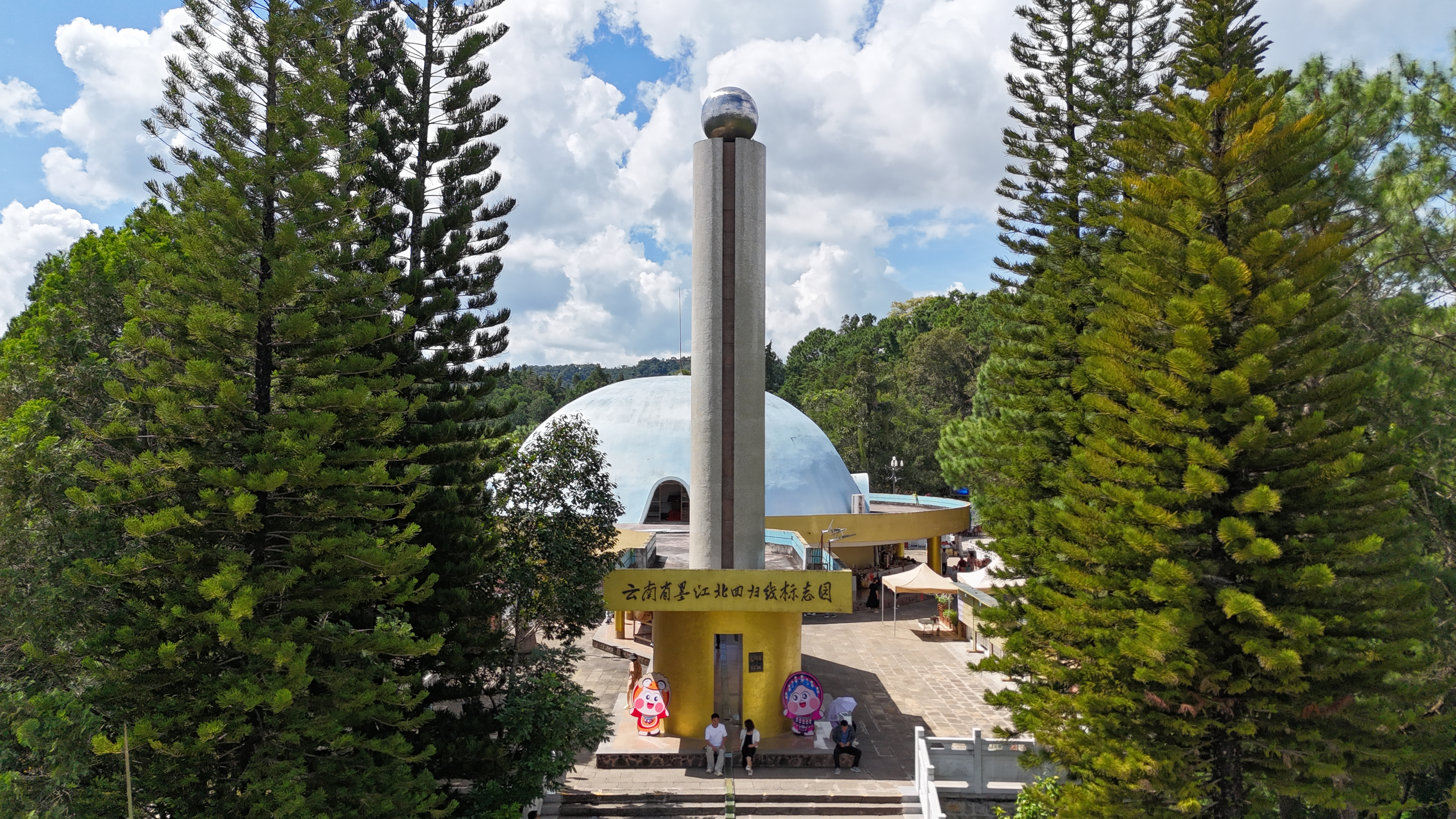
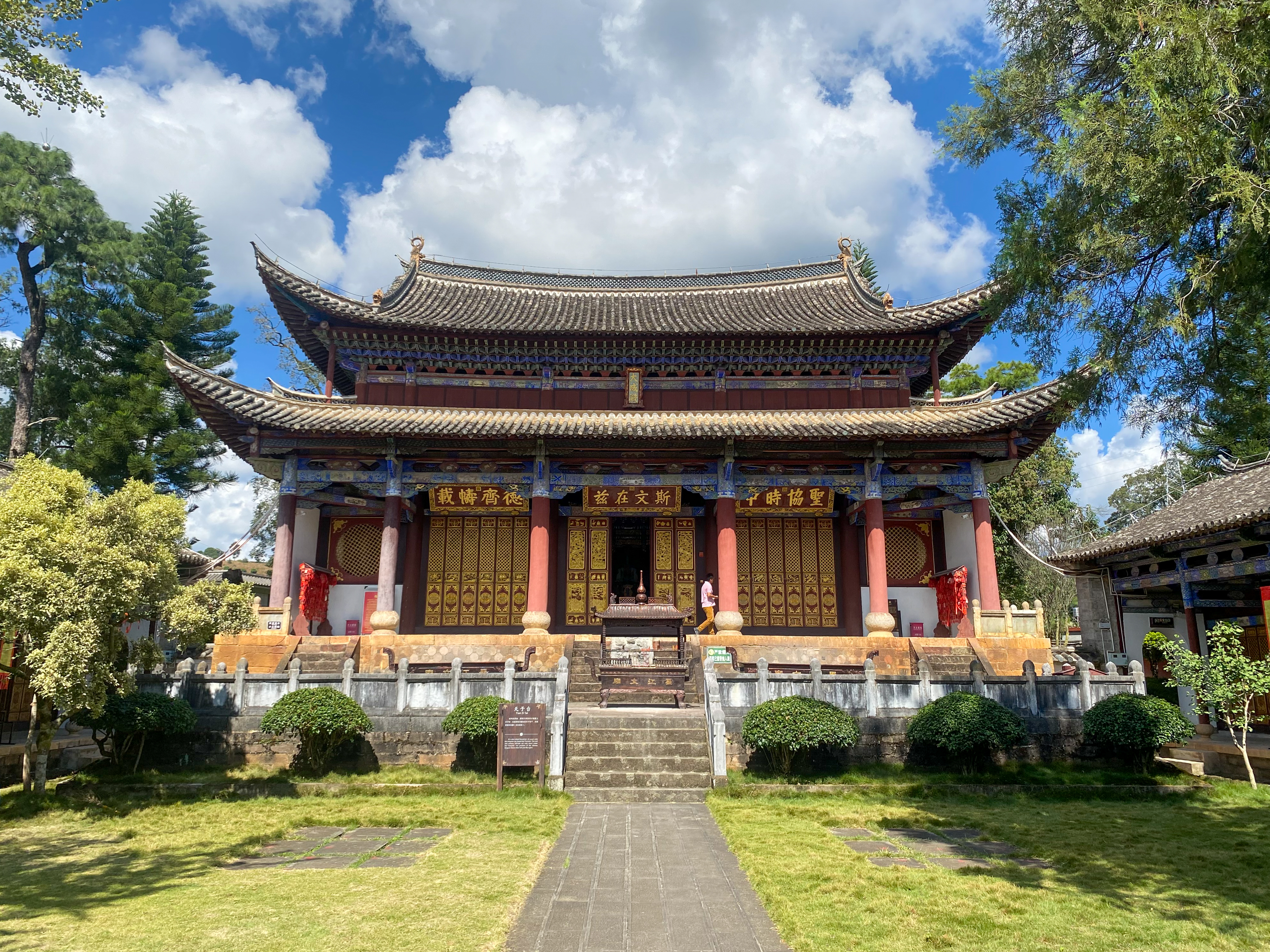
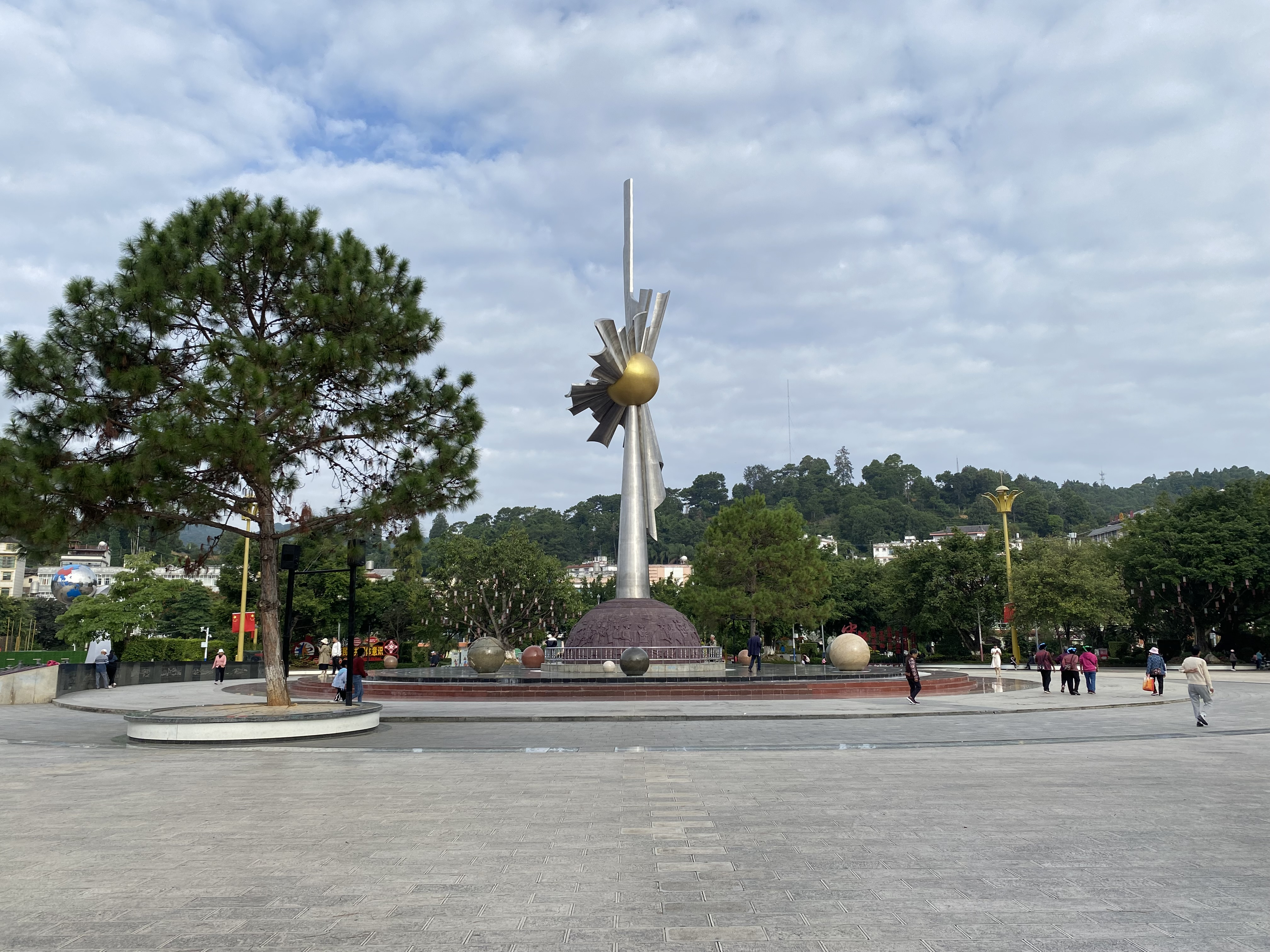
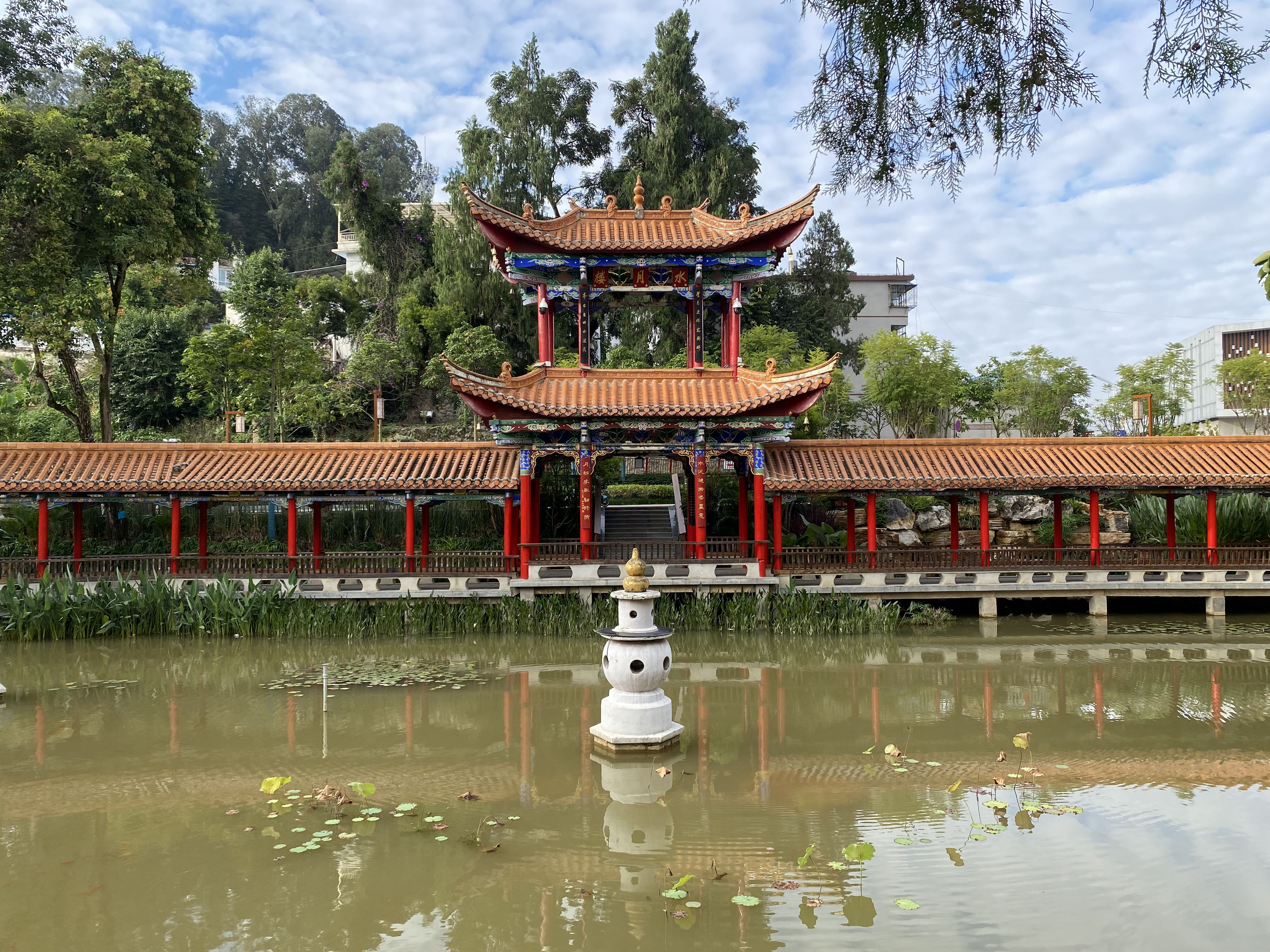
- Cityscape of county town Tropic of Cancer Tower Mojiang Confucian Temple The Sun Square Puyi Park

- Location of Mojiang County (red) and Pu'er City (pink) within Yunnan

- Location of the seat in Yunnan
- Coordinates: 23°25′55″N 101°41′31″E
- Country: China
- Province: Yunnan
- Prefecture-level city: Pu'er
- GB/T 2260 CODE: 530822
- County seat: Lianzhu

Area
  - Total: 5,312 km^{2} (2,051 sq mi)

Population (2020 census)
  - Total: 281,554
  - Density: 53.00/km^{2} (137.3/sq mi)
- Time zone: UTC+8 (China Standard Time)
- Postal code: 654800
- Area code: 0879
- Website: www.mojiang.gov.cn
- ^{1}Yunnan Statistics Bureau^{2}Puer Gov.^{3}Yunnan Portal

Mojiang Hani Autonomous County (simplified Chinese: 墨江哈尼族自治县; traditional Chinese: 墨江哈尼族自治縣; pinyin: Mòjiāng Hānízú Zìzhìxiàn; Hani: Meiqjal Haqniqssaq Ziiqziifxeif) is an autonomous county under the jurisdiction of Pu'er City, in the south of Yunnan Province, China. It borders Zhenyuan County and Xinping County to the north, Yuanjiang County, Honghe County and Lüchun County to the east, Jiangcheng County to the south and Ning'er County to the west.

== Administrative divisions ==
In the present, Mojiang Hani Autonomous County has 12 towns, 2 townships and 1 ethnic township.

12 towns

- Lianzhu (联珠镇)
- Tongguan (通关镇)
- Longba (龙坝镇)
- Xin'an (新安镇)
- Tuantian (团田镇)
- Xinfu (新抚镇)
- Jingxing (景星镇)
- Yutang (鱼塘镇)
- Wenwu (文武镇)
- Baliu (坝溜镇)
- Sinanjiang (泗南江镇)
- Yayi (雅邑镇)

2 townships

- Longtan Township (龙潭乡)
- Naha Township (那哈乡)

1 ethnic township

- Mengnong Yi Ethnic Township (孟弄彝族乡)

== Demographics ==
There was a total of 210,628 ethnic Hani in Mojiang County as of 2006. Hani subgroups in Mojiang County include the following, with 2006 population estimates (Jiang, et al. 2009:3) and language classifications (Mojiang County Ethnic Gazetteer 2007:22).

- Bi-Ka languages
  - Biyue 碧约 (63,359 people)
  - Kaduo 卡多 (62,696 people)
  - Ximoluo 西摩洛 (14,711 people)
  - Kabie 卡别 (1,243 people)
- Hao-Bai languages
  - Haoni 豪尼 (29,915 people)
  - Baihong 白宏 (27,052 people)
  - Lami 腊米 (3,105 people)
  - Amu 阿木 (7,050 people)
- Qiedi 切弟 (1,497 people) (not classified)

The Budu and Bukong are also found in Mojiang County.

- Budu 布都 (17,498 people)
- Bukong 布孔 (14,106 people), including in Niangpuzhai 娘浦寨, Mengli Village 勐里村, Longba Township 龙坝乡

According to the Mojiang County Gazetteer (2002:640), ethnic Bulang, who numbered 2,968 individuals as of 1993, are found in the townships of Jingxing 景星, Xinwu 新抚, and Tongguan 通关. The Bulang of Mojiang County speak Va, an Angkuic language.

In Mojiang County, ethnic Yao are found in Yaojia 瑶家 and Guangshan 光山 of Manxing Village 曼兴村, Wenwu Township 文武乡.

== Transport ==
- China National Highway 213

== Climate ==
Climate data for Mojiang, elevation 1,366 m (4,482 ft), (1991–2020 normals, extremes 1981–2010)
Month	Jan	Feb	Mar	Apr	May	Jun	Jul	Aug	Sep	Oct	Nov	Dec	Year
Record high °C (°F)	27.2 (81.0)	29.4 (84.9)	31.3 (88.3)	33.4 (92.1)	34.4 (93.9)	32.1 (89.8)	32.5 (90.5)	32.7 (90.9)	31.7 (89.1)	30.2 (86.4)	27.4 (81.3)	25.6 (78.1)	34.4 (93.9)
Mean daily maximum °C (°F)	20.4 (68.7)	22.9 (73.2)	26.0 (78.8)	28.0 (82.4)	28.4 (83.1)	28.1 (82.6)	27.4 (81.3)	27.7 (81.9)	26.9 (80.4)	24.7 (76.5)	22.4 (72.3)	19.8 (67.6)	25.2 (77.4)
Daily mean °C (°F)	12.3 (54.1)	14.2 (57.6)	17.4 (63.3)	20.0 (68.0)	21.8 (71.2)	22.8 (73.0)	22.4 (72.3)	22.2 (72.0)	21.1 (70.0)	18.9 (66.0)	15.3 (59.5)	12.5 (54.5)	18.4 (65.1)
Mean daily minimum °C (°F)	7.0 (44.6)	7.8 (46.0)	10.7 (51.3)	13.7 (56.7)	16.9 (62.4)	19.5 (67.1)	19.7 (67.5)	19.2 (66.6)	18.1 (64.6)	15.8 (60.4)	11.3 (52.3)	8.2 (46.8)	14.0 (57.2)
Record low °C (°F)	−0.4 (31.3)	1.9 (35.4)	−0.1 (31.8)	7.1 (44.8)	10.1 (50.2)	12.2 (54.0)	15.8 (60.4)	14.1 (57.4)	9.7 (49.5)	7.3 (45.1)	2.5 (36.5)	−2.5 (27.5)	−2.5 (27.5)
Average precipitation mm (inches)	33.0 (1.30)	20.7 (0.81)	31.4 (1.24)	64.3 (2.53)	125.5 (4.94)	185.6 (7.31)	262.4 (10.33)	232.3 (9.15)	143.1 (5.63)	113.5 (4.47)	49.0 (1.93)	23.5 (0.93)	1,284.3 (50.57)
Average precipitation days (≥ 0.1 mm)	5.0	4.3	5.4	9.9	15.0	20.3	24.1	22.6	17.1	14.3	6.7	4.6	149.3
Average snowy days	0.1	0	0	0	0	0	0	0	0	0	0	0	0.1
Average relative humidity (%)	76	69	63	66	73	80	84	84	84	83	82	80	77
Mean monthly sunshine hours	216.8	227.6	248.8	251.1	228.6	167.5	142.8	159.5	156.7	154.3	186.4	186.2	2,326.3
Percentage possible sunshine	64	71	67	66	56	41	35	40	43	43	57	56	53
Source: China Meteorological Administration

== Notes ==
- Jiang Ying [蒋颖], Cui Xia [崔霞], Qiao Xiang [乔翔]. 2009. A study of Ximoluo [西摩洛语研究]. Beijing: Ethnic Publishing House [民族出版社].
- Yang Hong [杨洪], Zhang Hong [张红]. 2010. Demographics and current situations of Hani subgroups in Mojiang County [墨江哈尼族自治县哈尼支系与人口现状调查研究]. Journal of Honghe University [红河学院学报]. Vol. 8, No. 3. Jun. 2010. DOI:10.13963/j.cnki.hhuxb.2010.03.028
