= Honghe Subdistrict =

Honghe Subdistrict 红河街道
- Town
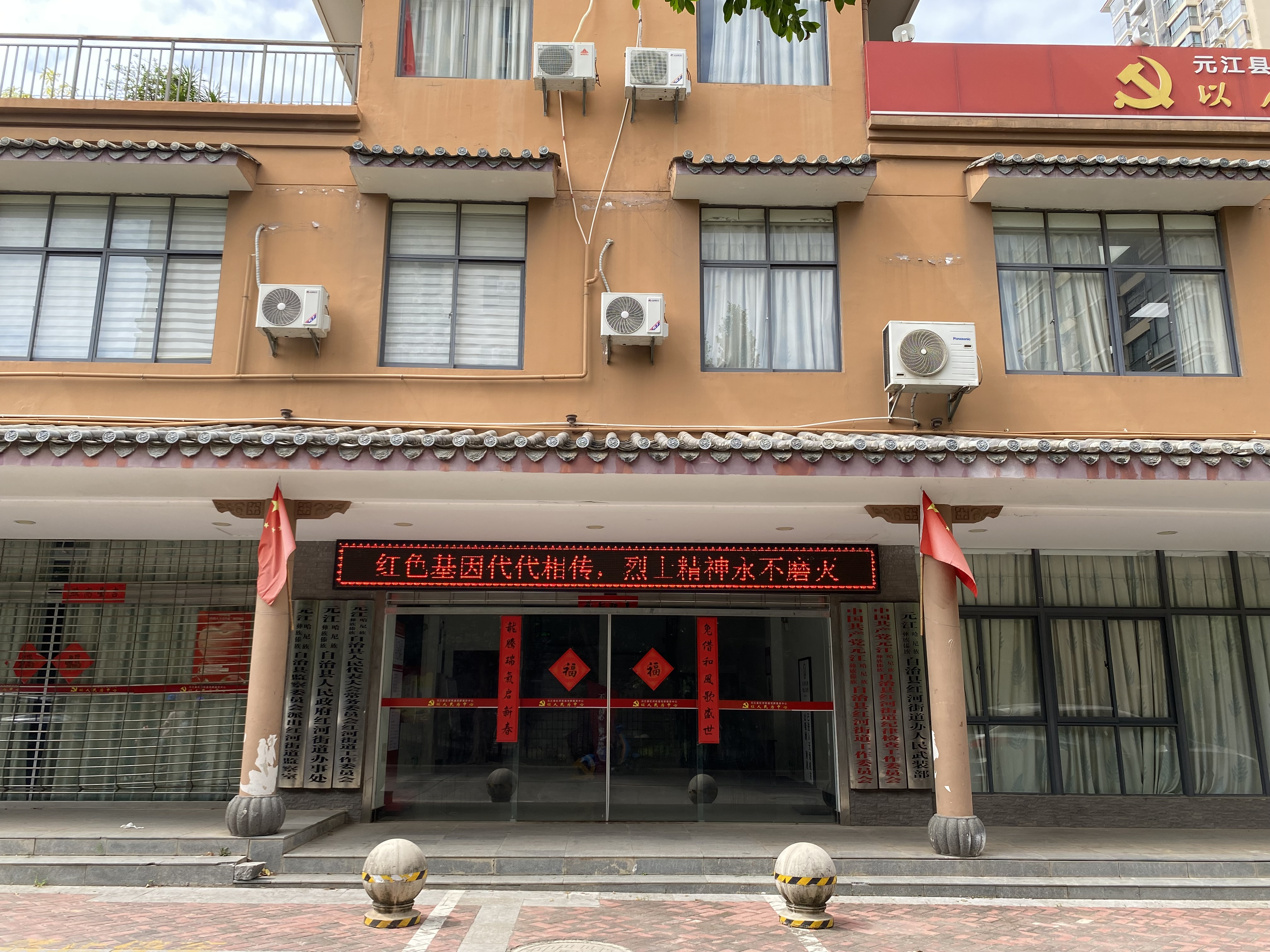
- Honghe town hall

- Location in Yunnan.
- Coordinates: 23°36′12″N 102°00′38″E
- Country: People's Republic of China
- Province: Yunnan
- Prefecture-level city: Yuxi
- Autonomous county: Yuanjiang Hani, Yi and Dai Autonomous County

Area
  - Total: 66 km^{2} (25 sq mi)
- Time zone: UTC+08:00 (China Standard)
- Postal code: 653300
- Area code: 0877

Honghe Subdistrict (simplified Chinese: 红河街道; traditional Chinese: 紅河街道; pinyin: Hónghé Jiēdào) is a subdistrict in Yuanjiang Hani, Yi and Dai Autonomous County, Yunnan, China. It is the political, economic, and cultural center of Yuanjiang Hani and Yi Autonomous County.

== Administrative division ==
As of 2016, the subdistrict is divided into five villages:

- Honghe Community (红河社区)
- Fenghuang Community (凤凰社区)
- Xingyuan Community (兴元社区)
- Dashuiping Community (大水平社区)
- Qiaotou Community (桥头社区)

== History ==
In August 2011, it was upgraded to a town. It formerly known as "Lijiang Town" (澧江镇).

== Geography ==
It lies at the central of Yuanjiang Hani, Yi and Dai Autonomous County, bordering Manlai Town to the northwest, Lijiang Subdistrict to the south, Ganzhuang Subdistrict to the northeast, and Mili Township to the southeast.

The Yuan River (元江) winds through the subdistrict.

== Economy ==
The region's economy is based on agriculture, industry, and commerce.

== Transportation ==
The subdistrict is connected to two highways: the National Highway G553 and G213.
