= Naruo Township =

Naruo Township 那婼乡
- Township
- Location in Yunnan.
- Coordinates: 23°23′16″N 102°07′00″E
- Country: People's Republic of China
- Province: Yunnan
- Prefecture-level city: Yuxi
- Autonomous county: Yuanjiang Hani, Yi and Dai Autonomous County

Area
  - Total: 108 km^{2} (42 sq mi)

Population (2017)
  - Total: 17,328
  - Density: 160/km^{2} (416/sq mi)
- Time zone: UTC+08:00 (China Standard)
- Postal code: 653305
- Area code: 0877

Naruo Township (simplified Chinese: 那婼乡; traditional Chinese: 那婼鄉; pinyin: Nàruò Xiāng) is a township in Yuanjiang Hani, Yi and Dai Autonomous County, Yunnan, China. As of the 2017 census it had a population of 17,328 and an area of 108-square-kilometre (42 sq mi).

== Etymology ==
"Naruo" is a Hani place name, which means "village".

== Administrative division ==
As of 2016, the township is divided into one community and five villages:

- Naruo (那诺社区)
- Langshu (朗树村)
- Hashi (哈施村)
- Damang (打芒村)
- Zhujie (猪街村)
- Zhedang (者党村)

== Geography ==
The township is situated at the southeastern Yuanjiang Hani, Yi and Dai Autonomous County. It is bordered to the north by Yangjie Township, to the east by Lijiang Subdistrict, and to the south, southeast and west by Honghe County.

The township experiences a subtropical monsoon climate, with an average annual temperature of 16.5 °C (61.7 °F) and total annual rainfall of 800-millimetre (31 in).

== Economy ==
The local economy is primarily based upon agriculture. Commercial crops include sugarcane, tobacco, and tea.

== Transportation ==
The township is connected to two highways: the National Highway G553 and the Yuanjiang–Manhao Expressway (元蔓高速公路).
