= Wadie Township =

Wadie Township 洼垤乡
- Township
- Location in Yunnan.
- Coordinates: 23°32′32″N 102°17′00″E
- Country: People's Republic of China
- Province: Yunnan
- Prefecture-level city: Yuxi
- Autonomous county: Yuanjiang Hani, Yi and Dai Autonomous County

Area
  - Total: 329 km^{2} (127 sq mi)
- Elevation: 1,380 m (4,530 ft)

Population (2017)
  - Total: 7,660
  - Density: 23.3/km^{2} (60.3/sq mi)
- Time zone: UTC+08:00 (China Standard)
- Postal code: 653306
- Area code: 0877

Wadie Township (simplified Chinese: 洼垤乡; traditional Chinese: 窪垤鄉; pinyin: Wādié Xiāng) is a township in Yuanjiang Hani, Yi and Dai Autonomous County, Yunnan, China. As of the 2017 census it had a population of 7,660 and an area of 329-square-kilometre (127 sq mi).

== Etymology ==
Wadie was named after Bai Wadie (白挖垤), an official in late Ming (1368–1644) and early Qing dynasty (1644–1911).

== Administrative division ==
As of 2016, the township is divided into one community and six villages:

- Wadie Community (洼垤社区)
- Tajike (它吉克村)
- Laochaji (老茶吉村)
- Yicibei (邑慈碑村)
- Luodie (罗垤村)
- Tacaiji (它才吉村)
- Nibai (尼白村)

== Geography ==
It lies at the southeastern of Yuanjiang Hani, Yi and Dai Autonomous County, bordering Lijiang Subdistrict and Honghe County to the southwest, Longtan Township to the north, and Shiping County to the east.

The highest point in the township is Mount Mezuo (么佐山) which stands 2,260 metres (7,410 ft) above sea level. The lowest point is in Xiaohedi River (小河底河), which, at 320 metres (1,050 ft) above sea level.

The township experiences a temperate and monsoonal climate, with an average annual temperature of 17.5 °C (63.5 °F), and total annual rainfall of 980-millimetre (39 in).

The Xiaohedi River (小河底) flows through the township south to north.

The township has five reservoirs, including Podie Reservoir (坡垤水库) and Wayaochong Reservoir (瓦窑冲水库).

== Economy ==
The principal industries in the area are agriculture, forestry and animal husbandry. Significant crops include rice, wheat, corn, and bean. Economic crops are mainly sugarcane, tobacco, and rape.

== Transportation ==
The Provincial Highway S212 winds through the township.
