= Longtan Township, Yuanjiang County =

Longtan Township 龙潭乡
- Township
- Location in Yunnan.
- Coordinates: 23°39′25″N 102°10′16″E
- Country: People's Republic of China
- Province: Yunnan
- Prefecture-level city: Yuxi
- Autonomous county: Yuanjiang Hani, Yi and Dai Autonomous County

Area
  - Total: 272 km^{2} (105 sq mi)

Population (2017)
  - Total: 5,171
  - Density: 19.0/km^{2} (49.2/sq mi)
- Time zone: UTC+08:00 (China Standard)
- Postal code: 653311
- Area code: 0877

Longtan Township (simplified Chinese: 龙潭乡; traditional Chinese: 龍潭鄉; pinyin: Lóngtán Xiāng) is a township in Yuanjiang Hani, Yi and Dai Autonomous County, Yunnan, China. As of the 2017 census it had a population of 5,171 and an area of 272-square-kilometre (105 sq mi).

== Administrative division ==
As of 2016, the township is divided into one community and six villages:

- Anlong Community (安龙社区)
- Dashao (大哨村)
- Shuikemo (水可莫村)
- Deng'er (邓耳村)
- Takezhi (它科垤村)
- Yijiachong (邑甲冲村)
- Anai (阿乃村)

== Geography ==
The township sits at the eastern Yuanjiang Hani, Yi and Dai Autonomous County. It is surrounded by Ganzhuang Subdistrict on the northwest, Shiping County on the northeast, Wadie Township on the southeast, and Lijiang Subdistrict on the southwest.

The township experiences a subtropical monsoon climate, with an average annual temperature of 15.4 °C (59.7 °F), and total annual rainfall of 1,100-millimetre (43 in).

The highest point is Mount Qintian (擎天山), elevation 2,248 metres (7,375 ft)

There are five major streams in the township, namely the Deng'er Stream (邓耳小河), Luyechong Stream (鲁业冲), Anaichong Stream (阿乃冲), Dazhujing Stream (大竹箐), and Xiangjiaochong Stream (香蕉冲).

== Economy ==
The economy of the township has a predominantly agricultural orientation, including farming and pig-breeding. Significant crops include rice, wheat, and corn. Tobacco, sugarcane, and rape are the economic plants of this region. The region abounds with iron, lead, zinc, silver, and silicon.
