= Mili Township =

Mili Township 咪哩乡
- Township
- Location in Yunnan.
- Coordinates: 23°30′21″N 101°51′04″E
- Country: People's Republic of China
- Province: Yunnan
- Prefecture-level city: Yuxi
- Autonomous county: Yuanjiang Hani, Yi and Dai Autonomous County

Area
  - Total: 190.13 km^{2} (73.41 sq mi)
- Elevation: 1,400 m (4,600 ft)

Population (2017)
  - Total: 13,719
  - Density: 72.156/km^{2} (186.88/sq mi)
- Time zone: UTC+08:00 (China Standard)
- Postal code: 653309
- Area code: 0877

Mili Township (simplified Chinese: 咪哩乡; traditional Chinese: 咪哩鄉; pinyin: Mīlǐ Xiāng) is a township in Yuanjiang Hani, Yi and Dai Autonomous County, Yunnan, China. As of the 2017 census it had a population of 13,719 and an area of 190.13-square-kilometre (73.41 sq mi).

== Administrative division ==
As of 2016, the township is divided into one community and five villages:

- Mili Community (咪哩社区)
- Haluo (哈罗村)
- Daheipu (大黑铺村)
- Daxin (大新村)
- Wana (瓦纳村)
- Gancha (甘岔村)

== History ==
It was formerly known as "Chongshan Township" (崇善乡) before 1949.

== Geography ==
The township sits at the southwestern Yuanjiang Hani, Yi and Dai Autonomous County. It shares a border with Mojiang Hani Autonomous County to the west, Yangjie Township to the east, Yinyuan Town to the south, and Manlai Town to the north.

The highest point in the township is Mount Laolinliangzi (大兴老林梁子) which stands 2,321 metres (7,615 ft) above sea level. The lowest point is Manshatian (漫沙田), which, at 966 metres (3,169 ft) above sea level.

There are three major rivers and streams in the township, namely the Wana River (瓦纳河), Nanzhang Stream (南掌河), Xiaomiao Stream (小庙河), and Yangma River (养马河).

The township is in the subtropical monsoon climate zone, with an average annual temperature of 16 to 17 °C (61 to 63 °F), total annual rainfall of 1,200-millimetre (47 in), and a frost-free period of 300 days.

== Economy ==
The region's economy is based on agriculture and animal husbandry. The main crops are rice, wheat, corn, and vegetable. Commercial crops include tobacco, sugarcane, rape, pear, persimmon, and walnut. The region abounds with iron, nickel, and serpentine.

== Tourist attractions ==
The Wana Hot Spring (瓦纳温泉) is a popular attraction in the township.

== Transportation ==
The National Highway G213 passes across the township north to south.
