= Manlai =

Manlai Town 曼来镇
- Town
- Location in Yunnan.
- Coordinates: 23°39′47″N 101°53′07″E
- Country: People's Republic of China
- Province: Yunnan
- Prefecture-level city: Yuxi
- Autonomous county: Yuanjiang Hani, Yi and Dai Autonomous County

Area
  - Total: 395.14 km^{2} (152.56 sq mi)

Population (2017)
  - Total: 31,580
  - Density: 79.92/km^{2} (207.0/sq mi)
- Time zone: UTC+08:00 (China Standard)
- Postal code: 653300
- Area code: 0877

Manlai (simplified Chinese: 曼来镇; traditional Chinese: 曼來鎮; pinyin: Mànlái Zhèn) is a town in Yuanjiang Hani, Yi and Dai Autonomous County, Yunnan, China. As of the 2017 census it had a population of 31,580 and an area of 395.14-square-kilometre (152.56 sq mi).

== Administrative division ==
As of 2016, the town is divided into one community and eleven villages:

- Manlai Community (曼来社区)
- Dong'e (东峨村)
- Nongchangtian (农场田村)
- Datianfang (大田房村)
- Xinguang (新光村)
- Hongqi (红旗村)
- Alongpu (阿龙浦村)
- Pingchang (平昌村)
- Nanxi (南溪村)
- Tuantian (团田村)
- Dangong (旦弓村)
- Hanjiazhai (韩家寨村)

== History ==
In 2011, Dong'e Town (东峨镇), Yangchajie Township (羊岔街乡) and Hongguang Farm (红光农场) merged to form Manlai Town.

== Geography ==
The town is situated at the northwestern Yuanjiang Hani, Yi and Dai Autonomous County. It borders Xinping Yi and Dai Autonomous County in the north, Ganzhuang Subdistrict in the east, Lijiang Subdistrict in the south, and Mojiang Hani Autonomous County in the west.

The subdistrict experiences a subtropical monsoon humid climate, with an average annual temperature of 18 °C (64 °F), total annual rainfall of 1,400-millimetre (55 in).

== Economy ==
The local economy is primarily based upon agriculture and nearby mineral resources. Economic crops are mainly sugarcane, tobacco, mango, and longan. The region abounds with plaster stone, iron and gold.

== Transportation ==
The National Highway G213 passes across the town northeast to southwest.
