= Yangjie Township, Yuanjiang County =

Yangjie Township 羊街乡
- Township
- Location in Yunnan.
- Coordinates: 23°26′27″N 102°03′20″E
- Country: People's Republic of China
- Province: Yunnan
- Prefecture-level city: Yuxi
- Autonomous county: Yuanjiang Hani, Yi and Dai Autonomous County

Area
  - Total: 161 km^{2} (62 sq mi)

Population (2017)
  - Total: 17,488
  - Density: 109/km^{2} (281/sq mi)
- Time zone: UTC+08:00 (China Standard)
- Postal code: 653305
- Area code: 0877

Yangjie Township (simplified Chinese: 羊街乡; traditional Chinese: 羊街鄉; pinyin: Yangjie Xiāng) is a township in Yuanjiang Hani, Yi and Dai Autonomous County, Yunnan, China. As of the 2017 census it had a population of 17,488 and an area of 161-square-kilometre (62 sq mi).

== Administrative division ==
As of 2016, the township is divided into one community and five villages:

- Yangjie Community (羊街社区)
- Guodi (锅底村)
- Bamu (坝木村)
- Dangduo (党舵村)
- Zhixia (垤霞村)
- Langzhi (朗支村)

== Geography ==
The township sits at the southern Yuanjiang Hani, Yi and Dai Autonomous County. It borders Lijiang Subdistrict in the northeast, Nanuo Township in the south, and Yinyuan Town in the west.

The highest point is Mount Aboli (阿波里山), elevation 2,580 metres (8,460 ft).

There are five major rivers and streams in the township, namely the Qingshui Rivers (清水河), Gezhi River (戈垤河), Nanman River (南满河), Kunjiu River (昆酒河), and Kunhao River (昆蒿河).

== Economy ==
The region's economy is based on agriculture. Tea, sugarcane, tobacco are the economic plants of this region. The region abounds with rubies.

== Transportation ==
The township is connected to two highways: the National Highway G553 and the Yuanjiang–Manhao Expressway (元蔓高速公路).
