= Lijiang Subdistrict =

Lijiang Subdistrict 澧江街道
- Town
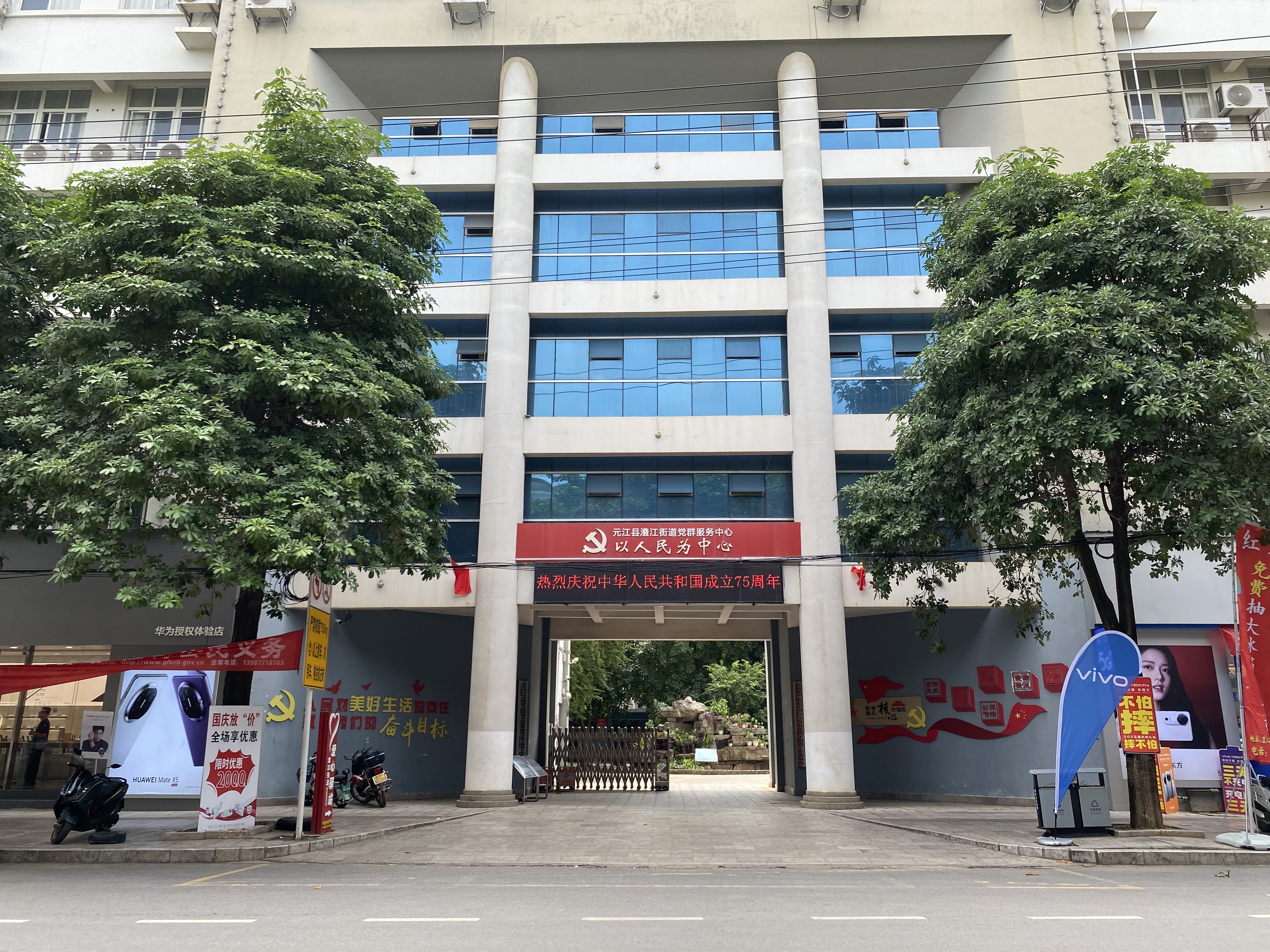
- Lijiang town hall

- Location in Yunnan.
- Coordinates: 23°35′54″N 101°58′49″E
- Country: People's Republic of China
- Province: Yunnan
- Prefecture-level city: Yuxi
- Autonomous county: Yuanjiang Hani, Yi and Dai Autonomous County

Area
  - Total: 264 km^{2} (102 sq mi)

Population (2017)
  - Total: 72,853
  - Density: 276/km^{2} (715/sq mi)
- Time zone: UTC+08:00 (China Standard)
- Postal code: 653300
- Area code: 0877

Lijiang Subdistrict (Chinese: 澧江街道; pinyin: Líjiāng Jiēdào) is a subdistrict in Yuanjiang Hani, Yi and Dai Autonomous County, Yunnan, China. As of the 2017 census it had a population of 72,853 and an area of 264-square-kilometre (102 sq mi).

== Administrative division ==
As of 2016, the subdistrict is divided into six communities and three villages:

- Lijiang Community (澧江社区)
- Yuhe Community (玉河社区)
- Jiangdong Community (江东社区)
- Hongqiao Community (红侨社区)
- Nazheng Community (那整社区)
- Longtan Community (龙潭社区)
- Nansa (南洒村)
- Nanhun (南昏村)
- Molang (莫郎村)

== History ==
In August 2011, it was upgraded to a town. It formerly known as "Lijiang Town" (澧江镇).

== Geography ==
The subdistrict is situated at the central Yuanjiang Hani, Yi and Dai Autonomous County. It is surrounded by Longtan Township, Honghe Subdistrict and Ganzhuang Subdistrict on the northeast, Yangjie Township and Naruo Township on the south, Yinyuan Town on the southwest, and Wazhi Township and Honghe County on the southeast.

The subdistrict enjoys a subtropical monsoon humid climate, with an average annual temperature of 23.8 °C (74.8 °F), total annual rainfall of 786-millimetre (30.9 in).

== Economy ==
The region's economy is based on agriculture, industry, and commerce.

== Transportation ==
The subdistrict is connected to two highways: the National Highway G553 and G213.
