= Yinyuan =

Yinyuan Town 因远镇
- Town
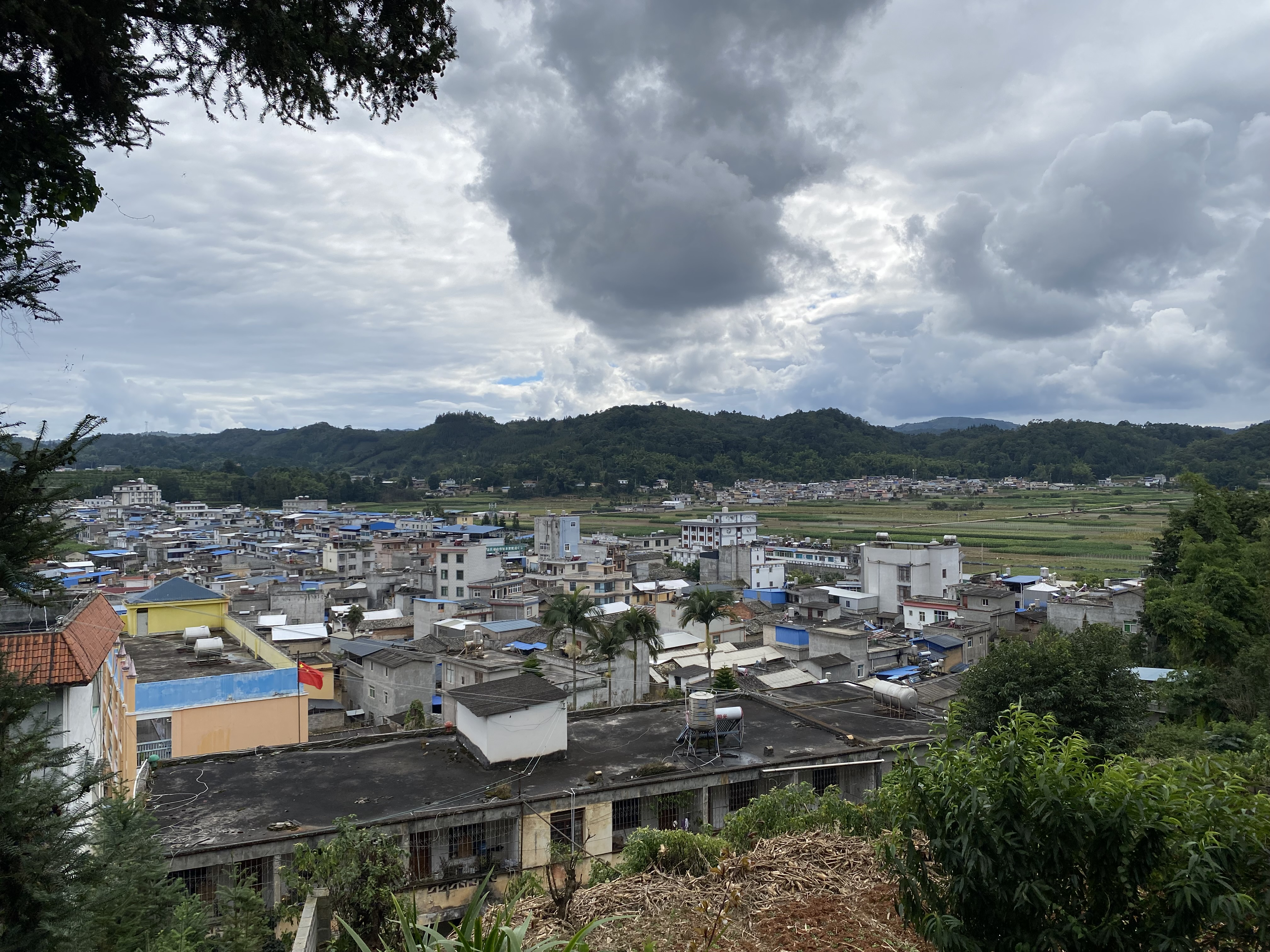
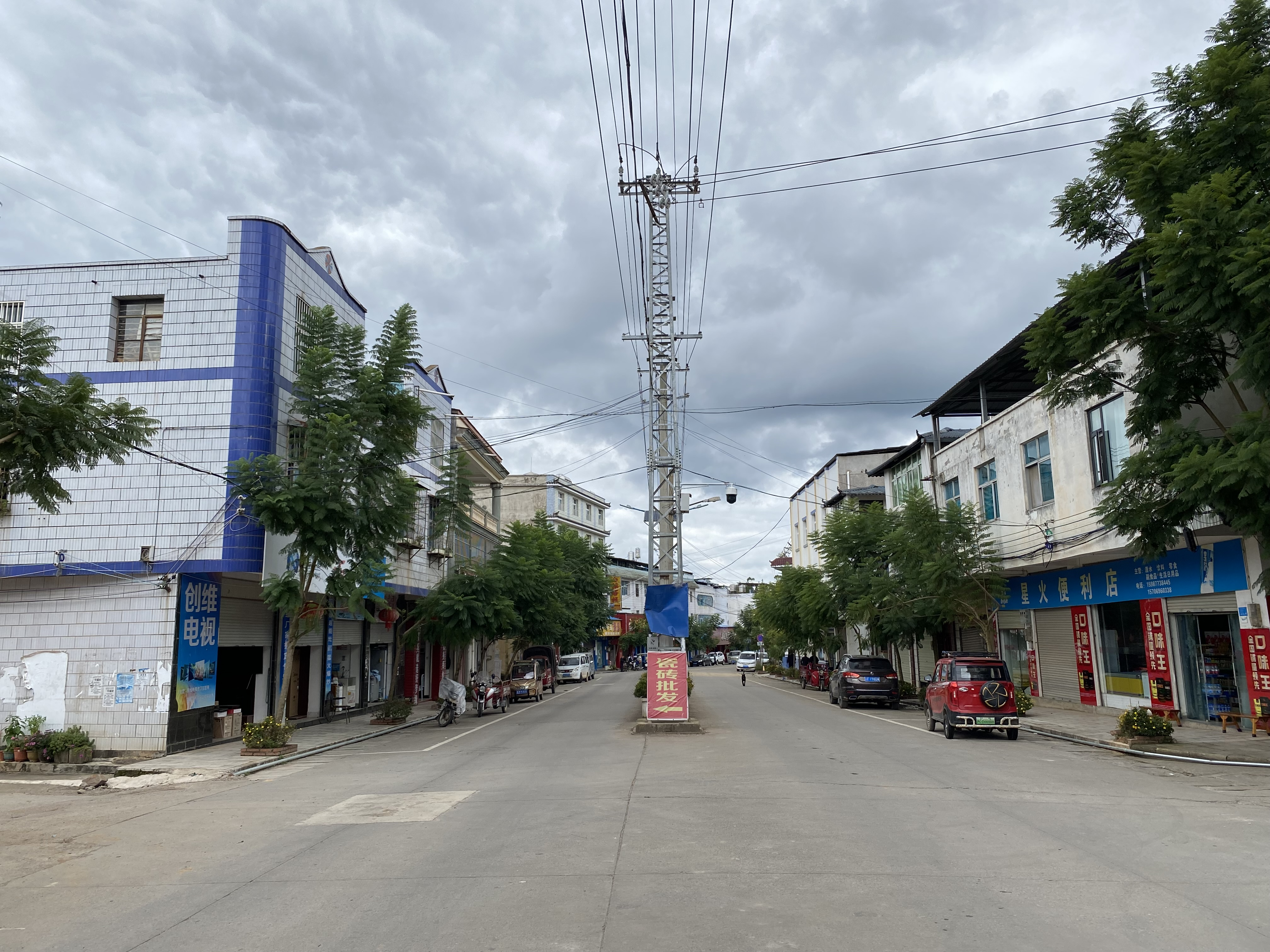
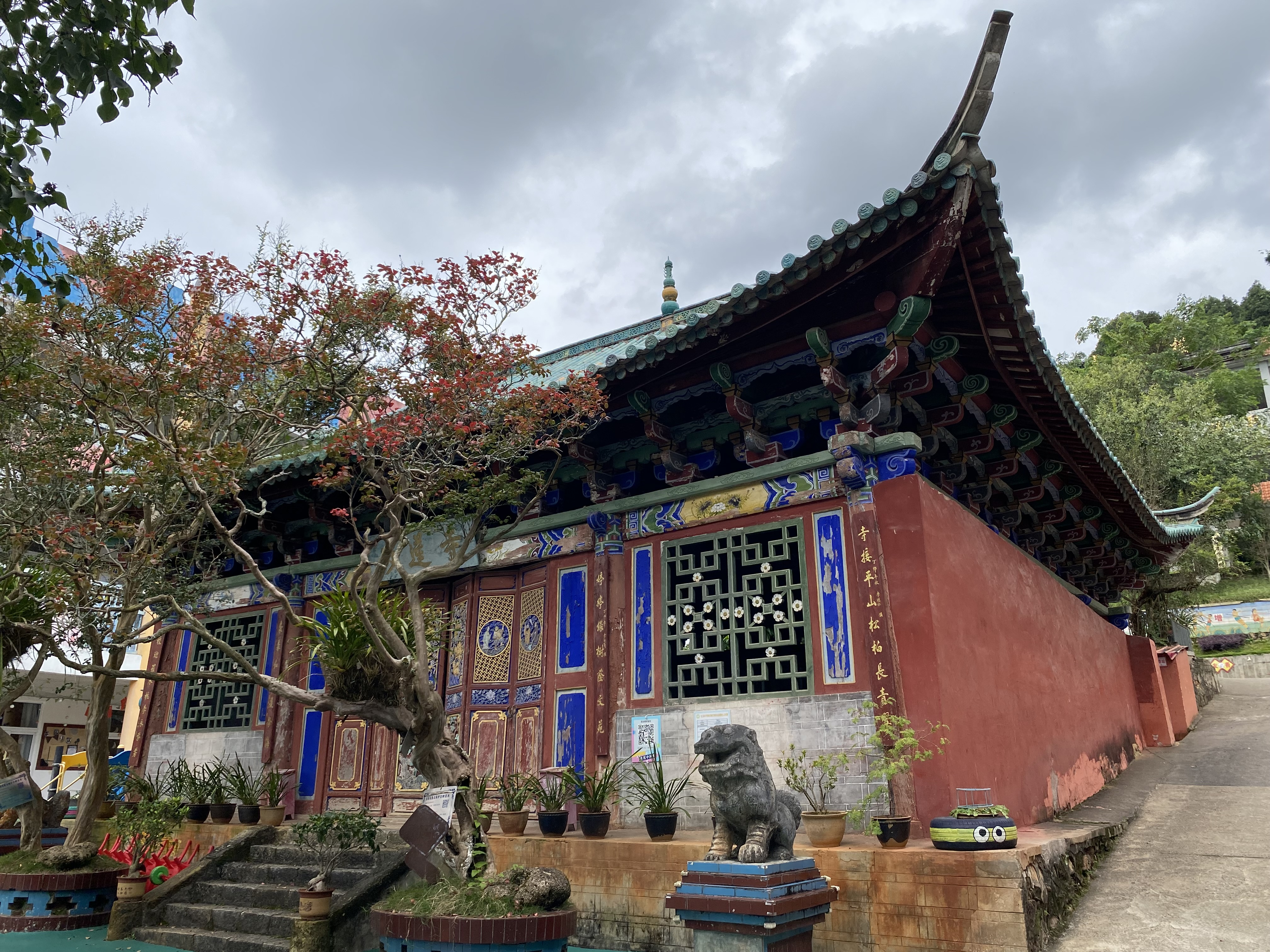
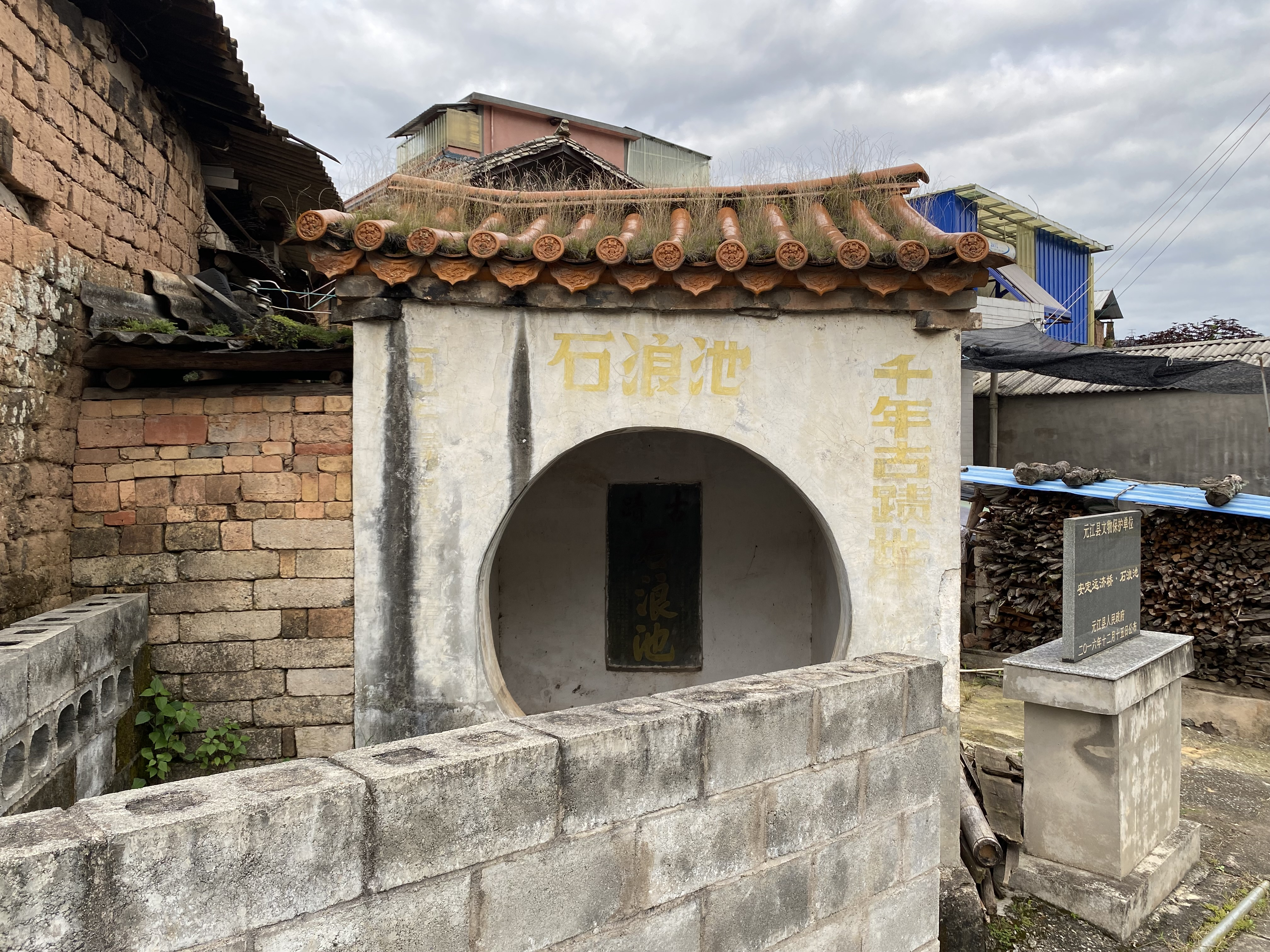
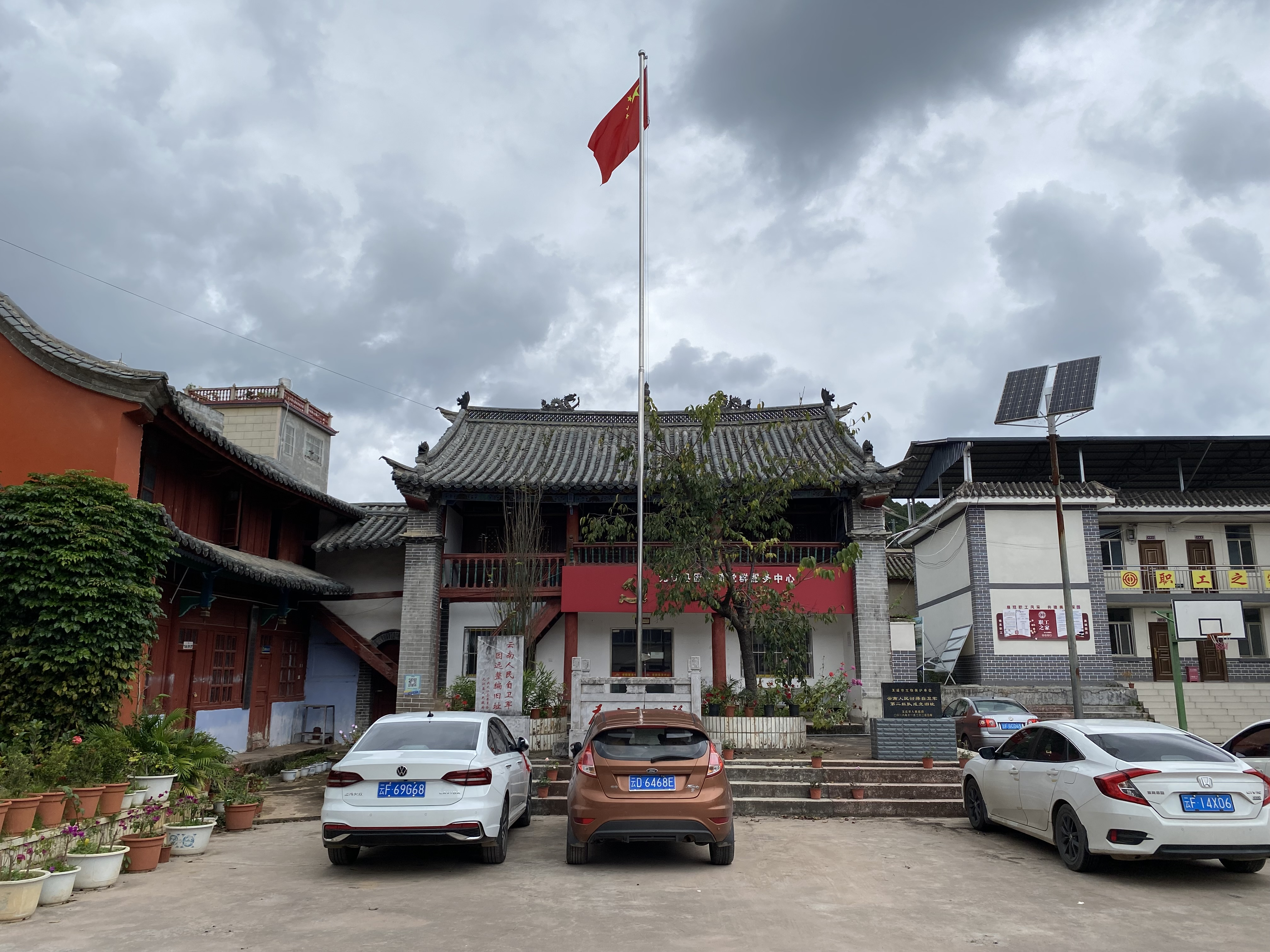
- Town skyline Beila Road Main hall of Miaolian Temple Shilang Sink Town hall

- Location in Yunnan.
- Coordinates: 23°24′25″N 101°50′59″E
- Country: People's Republic of China
- Province: Yunnan
- Prefecture-level city: Yuxi
- Autonomous county: Yuanjiang Hani, Yi and Dai Autonomous County

Area
  - Total: 329.8 km^{2} (127.3 sq mi)

Population (2017)
  - Total: 28,739
  - Density: 87.14/km^{2} (225.7/sq mi)
- Time zone: UTC+08:00 (China Standard)
- Postal code: 653303
- Area code: 0877

Yinyuan (simplified Chinese: 因远镇; traditional Chinese: 因遠鎮; pinyin: Yīnyuǎn Zhèn) is a town in Yuanjiang Hani, Yi and Dai Autonomous County, Yunnan, China. As of the 2017 census it had a population of 28,739 and an area of 329.8-square-kilometre (127.3 sq mi).

== Administrative division ==
As of 2016, the town is divided into two communities and seven villages:

- Yinyuan Community (因远社区)
- Anding Community (安定社区)
- Beize (北泽村)
- Chezhi (车垤村)
- Kala (卡腊村)
- Bankun (伴坤村)
- Dukui (都癸村)
- Pugui (浦贵村)
- Lutong (路同村)

== Geography ==
It lies at the southwestern of Yuanjiang Hani, Yi and Dai Autonomous County, bordering Mojiang Hani Autonomous County to the west, Honghe County to the south, Mili Township to the north, and Yangjie Township to the east.

The town experiences a marine monsoon climate, with an average annual temperature of 16 °C (61 °F) and total annual rainfall of 1,200-millimetre (47 in).

The Wulong Reservoir (乌龙水库) is a reservoir located in the town.

== Population ==
At the end of 2023 and the beginning of 2024, the resident population was 193,000, with an urbanization rate of 49.48%. The male population was 100,400, and the female population was 92,600. There were 29,800 individuals aged 0-14, 32,600 aged 0-15, 128,400 aged 16-59, 32,000 aged 60 and above, and 23,700 aged 65 and above. The total number of registered households was 67,687, with a registered population of 211,195, including 108,719 males and 102,476 females. The age distribution included 40,459 individuals aged 0-17, 50,632 aged 18-34, 86,912 aged 35-59, and 33,192 aged 60 and above. The ethnic population included 93,819 Hani, 46,048 Yi, and 25,693 Dai.

== Economy ==
The town's economy is based on nearby mineral resources and agricultural resources. Commercial crops include tobacco, tea, and rape. The region also has an abundance of gold, silver, nickel, iron, asbestos, and serpentine. The nickel reserves in the town rank second in China.

== Transportation ==
The National Highway G213 winds through the town.
