= Ganzhuang Subdistrict =

Ganzhuang Subdistrict 甘庄街道
- Town
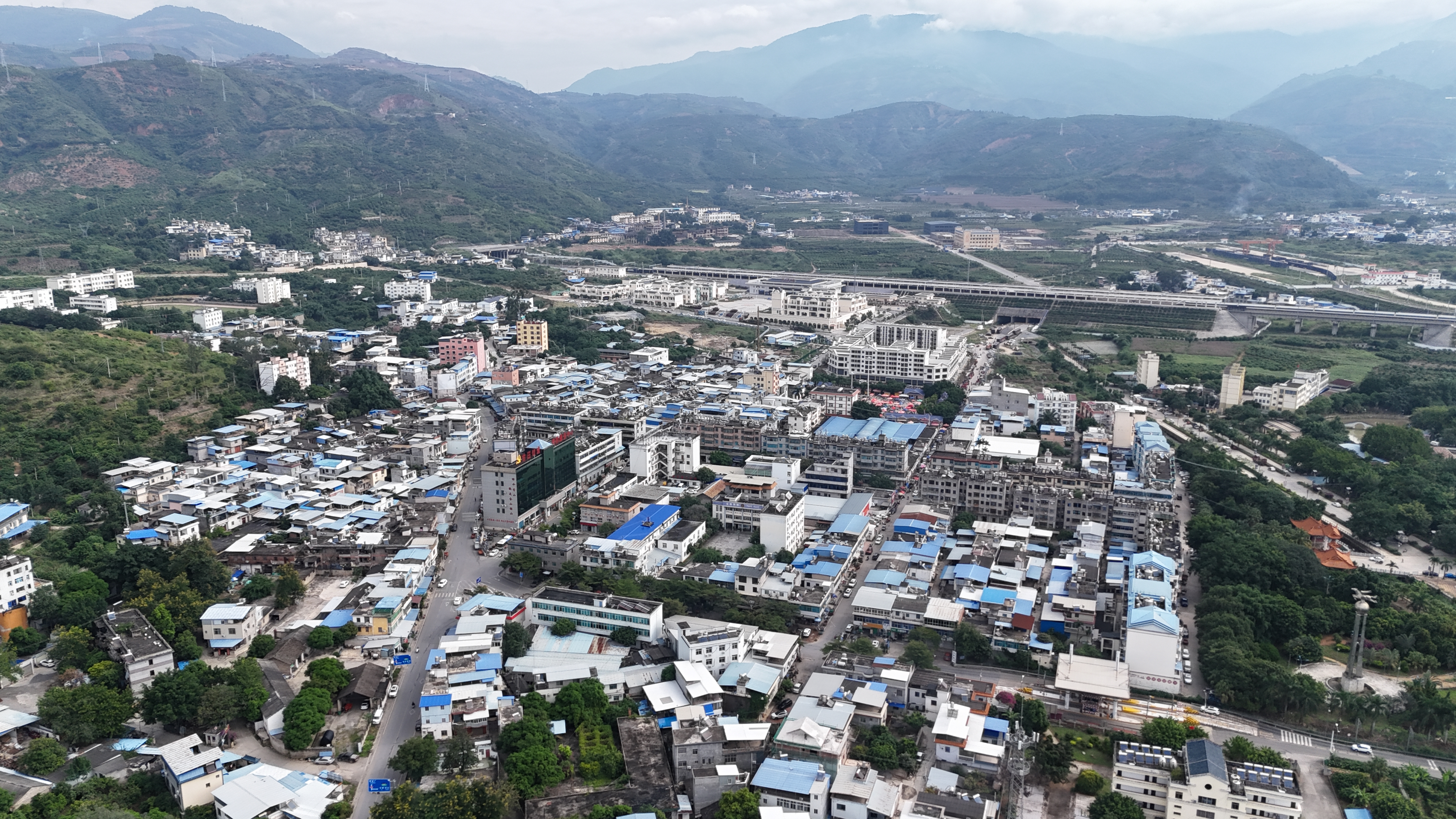

- Location in Yunnan.
- Coordinates: 23°42′05″N 102°00′33″E
- Country: People's Republic of China
- Province: Yunnan
- Prefecture-level city: Yuxi
- Autonomous county: Yuanjiang Hani, Yi and Dai Autonomous County

Area
  - Total: 594.5 km^{2} (229.5 sq mi)

Population (2017)
  - Total: 24,966
  - Density: 41.99/km^{2} (108.8/sq mi)
- Time zone: UTC+08:00 (China Standard)
- Postal code: 653308
- Area code: 0877

Ganzhuang Subdistrict (simplified Chinese: 甘庄街道; traditional Chinese: 甘莊街道; pinyin: Gānzhuāng Jiēdào) is a subdistrict in Yuanjiang Hani, Yi and Dai Autonomous County, Yunnan, China. As of the 2017 census it had a population of 24,966 and an area of 594.5-square-kilometre (229.5 sq mi).

== Administrative division ==
As of 2016, the subdistrict is divided into four communities and nine villages:

- Hongxin Community (红新社区)
- Ganzhuang Community (甘庄社区)
- Ganba Community (干坝社区)
- Qinglongchang Community (青龙厂社区)
- Take (它克村)
- Guoluozhi (果洛垤村)
- Tongchangchong (铜厂冲村)
- Cuoke (撮科村)
- Abudu (阿不都村)
- Jiamodai (假莫代村)
- Pengcheng (朋程村)
- Lutong (路通村)
- Xilahe (西拉河村)

== Geography ==
The subdistrict enjoys a subtropical monsoon humid climate, with an average annual temperature of 19 °C (66 °F), total annual rainfall of 1,100-millimetre (43 in).

== Economy ==
The subdistrict's economy is based on nearby mineral resources and agricultural resources. Tobacco, sugarcane, and fruit are commercial crops in the region. The region abounds with copper and iron.

== Transportation ==
The National Highway G213 passes across the subdistrict.
