= Fudong Township =

Fudong Township 富东乡
- Township
- Etymology: 富东, Fùdōng ("edge of a flat field")
- Location in Yunnan.
- Coordinates: 23°07′31″N 99°59′50″E
- Country: People's Republic of China
- Province: Yunnan
- Prefecture-level city: Pu'er City
- Autonomous county: Lancang Lahu Autonomous County
- Incorporated (township): 1988

Area
  - Total: 238 km^{2} (92 sq mi)

Population (2017)
  - Total: 13,824
  - Density: 58.1/km^{2} (150/sq mi)
- Time zone: UTC+08:00 (China Standard)
- Postal code: 665626
- Area code: 0879

Fudong Township (simplified Chinese: 富东乡; traditional Chinese: 富東鄉; pinyin: Fùdōng Xiāng) is a township in Lancang Lahu Autonomous County, Yunnan, China. As of the 2017 census it had a population of 13,824 and an area of 238-square-kilometre (92 sq mi).

== Etymology ==
The name "Fudong" originates from terms of Dai language. "Fu" means edge of a field and "Dong" means flat field.

== Administrative division ==
As of 2016, the township is divided into eight villages:

- Fudong (富东村)
- Taozishu (桃子树村)
- Dahei (打黑村)
- Nadong (那东村)
- Nandian (南滇村)
- Xiaoba (小坝村)
- Bangwai (邦崴村)
- Huangteng (黄藤村)

== History ==
It came under the jurisdiction of Wendong District (文东区) before 1988. It was incorporated as a township in 1988.

== Geography ==
It lies at the north of Lancang Lahu Autonomous County, bordering Wendong Wa Ethnic Township to the west, Dashan Township and Shangyun Town to the south, Shuangjiang Lahu, Va, Blang and Dai Autonomous County to the north, and Dashan Township to the east.

There are three reservoirs in the township, namely the Bangwai Reservoir (邦崴水库), Fudong Reservoir (富东水库) and Dahei Reservoir (打黑水库).

There are six rivers and streams in the township, namely the Nandian River (南滇河), Fudong River (富东河), Dahei River (打黑河), Xiaoba River (小坝河), Nanjiao River (南角河), and Baimujing River (柏木箐河).

== Economy ==
The economy is supported primarily by farming, ranching and mineral resources. Commercial crops include tea, Lanxangia tsaoko, Pseudocydonia, Zanthoxylum, and tobacco.

== Demographics ==
Population census
Year	Pop.	±%
2004	14,711	—
2017	13,824	−6.0%

As of 2017, the National Bureau of Statistics of China estimates the township's population now to be 13,824.

Ethnic groups in 2004
Ethnicity	Population	Percentage
Lahu	6009	40.8%
Han	6946	47.2%
Yi	1606	10.9%
Dai	52	0.4%
Blang	65	0.4%
Other	33	0.2%
