= Jiujing Hani Ethnic Township =

Jiujing Hani Ethnic Township 酒井哈尼族乡
- Ethnic township
- Etymology: 酒井, Jiǔjǐng ("wine well")
- Location in Yunnan.
- Coordinates: 22°26′53″N 99°58′31″E
- Country: People's Republic of China
- Province: Yunnan
- Prefecture-level city: Pu'er City
- Autonomous county: Lancang Lahu Autonomous County
- Incorporated (township): 1940

Area
  - Total: 381 km^{2} (147 sq mi)

Population (2017)
  - Total: 14,065
  - Density: 36.9/km^{2} (95.6/sq mi)
- Time zone: UTC+08:00 (China Standard)
- Postal code: 665699
- Area code: 0879

Jiujing Hani Ethnic Township (simplified Chinese: 酒井哈尼族乡; traditional Chinese: 酒井哈尼族鄉; pinyin: Jiǔjǐng Hānízú Xiāng) is an ethnic township in Lancang Lahu Autonomous County, Yunnan, China. As of the 2017 census it had a population of 14,065 and an area of 381-square-kilometre (147 sq mi).

== Etymology ==
In late Qing dynasty (1644–1911), the region was rich in wine, hence the name "Jiujing" (酒井; 'Wine well').

== Administrative division ==
As of 2016, the township is divided into four villages:

- Jiufang (酒房村)
- Yanyin (岩因村)
- Shuifang (税房村)
- Menggen (勐根村)

== History ==
It came under the jurisdiction of Tudusi (土都司) in the Qing dynasty (1644–1911).

In 1940, it was under the jurisdiction of the 1st District and then became Jiujing Township (酒井乡).

From 1949 to 1968, it was known as "Jiujing District" (酒井区). In 1969, it was renamed "Weidong Commune" (卫东公社) and then "Jiujing Commune" (酒井公社) in 1972. It was formed as a township in 1988.

== Geography ==
The township is situated at southern Lancang Lahu Autonomous County. The township is bordered to the north by Menglang Town, to the east by Nuozhadu Town, to the south by Huimin Town, and to the west by Donghui Town and Nuofu Township.

== Economy ==
The economy of the township has a predominantly agricultural orientation, including farming, ranching and pig-breeding. Commercial crops include tea, sugarcane, and coffee bean.

== Demographics ==
Population census
Year	Pop.	±%
2004	12,004	—
2017	14,065	+17.2%

As of 2017, the National Bureau of Statistics of China estimates the township's population now to be 14,065.

Ethnic groups in 2004
Ethnicity	Population	Percentage
Hani	5460	45.5%
Lahu	4676	39.0%
Han	647	5.4%
Wa	228	1.9%
Dai	808	6.7%
Other	185	1.5%

== Transportation ==
The National Highway G214 passes across the township north to south.
