= Zhutang Township, Lancang County =

Zhutang Township 竹塘乡
- Township
- Location in Yunnan.
- Coordinates: 22°42′48″N 99°48′22″E
- Country: People's Republic of China
- Province: Yunnan
- Prefecture-level city: Pu'er City
- Autonomous county: Lancang Lahu Autonomous County
- Incorporated (township): 1988

Area
  - Total: 636 km^{2} (246 sq mi)
- Elevation: 1,460 m (4,790 ft)

Population (2017)
  - Total: 32,455
  - Density: 51.0/km^{2} (132/sq mi)
- Time zone: UTC+08:00 (China Standard)
- Postal code: 665602
- Area code: 0879

Zhutang Township (simplified Chinese: 竹塘乡; traditional Chinese: 竹塘鄉; pinyin: Zhútáng Xiāng) is a township in Lancang Lahu Autonomous County, Yunnan, China. As of the 2017 census it had a population of 32,455 and an area of 636 square kilometres (246 sq mi).

== Administrative division ==
As of 2016, the township is divided into eleven villages:

- Munai (募乃村)
- Panzhihua (攀枝花村)
- Dongzhu (东主村)
- Yunshan (云山村)
- Laotanshan (老炭山村)
- Datangzi (大塘子村)
- Zhanmapo (战马坡村)
- Nanben (南本村)
- Cizhuhe (茨竹河村)
- Ganhe (甘河村)
- Junmeng (军勐村)

== History ==
In 1940, Zhutang District (竹塘区) was set up.

After the founding of the Communist State, in 1950, it became the seat of the county government. During the Great Leap Forward, its name was changed to "Qianjin Commune" (前进公社) in 1969 and then "Zhutang Commune" (竹塘公社) in 1972. It was incorporated as a township in 1988.

== Geography ==
It lies at the northern of Lancang Lahu Autonomous County, bordering Ximeng Va Autonomous County to the west, Menglang Town and Laba Township to the south, Fubang Township and Mujia Township to the north, and Nanling Township to the east.

The Nanlang River (南朗河) flows through the township northwest to southwest.

== Economy ==
The township's economy is based on nearby mineral resources and agricultural resources. The main crops of the region are grain, followed by corn and wheat. Economic crops are mainly tea, tobacco, and castanea mollissima. The region abounds with lead, zinc and limestone.

== Demographics ==
Population census
Year	Pop.	±%
2004	31,546	—
2017	32,455	+2.9%

As of 2017, the National Bureau of Statistics of China estimates the township's population now to be 32,455.

Ethnic groups in 2004
Ethnicity	Population	Percentage
Hani	2006	6.4%
Lahu	25159	79.8%
Han	4017	12.7%
Wa	128	0.4%
Yi	146	0.5%
Other	90	0.3%

== Transportation ==
The National Highway G214 passes across the township.

== Tourist attractions ==
The Datangzi Karst Cave (大塘子溶洞) is a well known tourist spot.
