= Wendong Wa Ethnic Township =

Wendong Wa Ethnic Township 文东佤族乡
- Ethnic township
- Etymology: 文, Wén ("a stockaded village"); 东, Dōng ("a village with little flat land")
- Location in Yunnan.
- Coordinates: 23°10′23″N 99°53′52″E
- Country: People's Republic of China
- Province: Yunnan
- Prefecture-level city: Pu'er City
- Autonomous county: Lancang Lahu Autonomous County
- Incorporated (township): 1940

Area
  - Total: 180 km^{2} (69 sq mi)

Population (2017)
  - Total: 14,471
  - Density: 80/km^{2} (210/sq mi)
- Time zone: UTC+08:00 (China Standard)
- Postal code: 665608
- Area code: 0879

Wendong Wa Ethnic Township (simplified Chinese: 文东佤族乡; traditional Chinese: 文東佤族鄉; pinyin: Wéndōng Wǎzú Xiāng) is an ethnic township in Lancang Lahu Autonomous County, Yunnan, China. As of the 2017 census it had a population of 14,471 and an area of 180-square-kilometre (69 sq mi).

== Etymology ==
The name "Wen" and "Dong" were place name of Wa language and Dai language, respectively. "Wen" means a stockaded village in Wa language. "Dong" means a village with little flat land.

== Administrative division ==
As of 2016, the township is divided into six villages:

- Xiaozhai (小寨村)
- Bangyou (邦佑村)
- Pasai (帕赛村)
- Shuitang (水塘村)
- Mangnuo (芒糯村)
- Duoyishu (多依树村)

== History ==
In 1940, it came under the jurisdiction of the 6th District. That same year, the 6th District was revoked and the Wendong Township (文东乡) was set up.

After the founding of the Communist State, it was renamed "Wendeng District" (文东区). In 1958, its name was changed to "Wendong Commune" (文东公社). In 1988, Wendong Wa Ethnic Township was officially incorporated.

== Geography ==
Wendong Wa Ethnic Township is located in northern Lancang Lahu Autonomous County. The township shares a border with Shangyun Town to the west and south, Fudong Township to the east, and Shuangjiang County to the north.

The Mangnuo River (芒糯河) and Bangying River (邦英河) flow through the township.

== Economy ==
The economy of the township has a predominantly agricultural orientation, including farming and pig-breeding. Grain, corn, sugarcane, and tea are the economic plants of this region.

== Demographics ==
Population census
Year	Pop.	±%
2004	13,480	—
2017	14,471	+7.4%

As of 2017, the National Bureau of Statistics of China estimates the township's population now to be 14,471.

Ethnic groups in 2004
Ethnicity	Population	Percentage
Lahu	895	6.6%
Han	4220	31.3%
Wa	7014	52.0%
Yi	171	1.3%
Blang	1163	8.6%
Other	17	0.1%

== Transportation ==
The National Highway G214 passes across the township north to south.
