= Shangyun =

Shangyun Town 上允镇
- Town
- Location in Yunnan.
- Coordinates: 23°02′51″N 99°50′02″E
- Country: People's Republic of China
- Province: Yunnan
- Prefecture-level city: Pu'er City
- Autonomous county: Lancang Lahu Autonomous County
- Designated (town): 1988

Area
  - Total: 433 km^{2} (167 sq mi)

Population (2018)
  - Total: 45,000
  - Density: 100/km^{2} (270/sq mi)
- Time zone: UTC+08:00 (China Standard)
- Postal code: 665607
- Area code: 0879

Shangyun (simplified Chinese: 上允镇; traditional Chinese: 上允鎮; pinyin: Shàngyǔn Zhèn) is a town in Lancang Lahu Autonomous County, Yunnan, China. As of the 2018 census it had a population of 45,000 and an area of 433-square-kilometre (167 sq mi).

== Administrative division ==
As of 2016, the town is divided into eleven villages:

- Shangyun (上允村)
- Balao (坝老村)
- Nanwa (南洼村)
- Manbeng (曼蚌村)
- Mengfo (勐佛村)
- Naruan (那阮村)
- Nannai (南乃村)
- Wengban (翁板村)
- Mangjiao (芒角村)
- Nonglang (弄浪村)
- Xiayun (下允村)

== History ==
After the establishment of the Communist State in 1949, it was known as "Shangyun District". It was officially designated a town until an administrative reorganisation in 1988.

== Geography ==
The town is situated at northwestern Lancang Lahu Autonomous County. The town is bordered to the north by Shuangjiang Lahu, Va, Blang and Dai Autonomous County and Wendong Wa Ethnic Township, to the east by Dashan Township and Donghe Township, to the south by Fubang Township, and to the west by Mujia Township and Ankang Wa Ethnic Township.

The town is in the subtropical monsoon climate zone, with an average annual temperature of 19.3 °C (66.7 °F), total annual rainfall of 1,020-millimetre (40 in). Winter are warm, while summer are cool.

It is surrounded by mountains, notably Mount Longtanjian (龙潭尖; 2,231 metres (7,320 ft)) in the north, Mount Baishitou (白石头山 in the east; 2,489 metres (8,166 ft)), Mount Houdiyakou (后的丫口; 2,294 metres (7,526 ft)) in the south, and Mount Chumake (处马科; 2,441 metres (8,009 ft)) in the west. In the middle is a basin.

The Shangyun River flows through the town.

The Taojinhe Reservoir (淘金河水库; 'Gold Washing River Reservoir') is a reservoir in the town, which provides drinking water and water for irrigation.

== Economy ==
The principal industries in the town are agriculture, forestry and mineral resources. The main crops of the region are grains, followed by corns and vegetables. Banana, sugarcane, tobacco, tea, natural rubber, Zanthoxylum, mango, pineapple, and Walnut are the economic plants of this region. The region abounds with coal, copper, zinc, and manganese.

== Demographics ==
Population census
Year	Pop.	±%
2004	43,832	—
2017	43,598	−0.5%
2018	45,000	+3.2%

The National Bureau of Statistics of China estimates the town's population was 45,000 in 2018.

Ethnic groups in 2004
Ethnicity	Population	Percentage
Lahu	7548	17.2%
Han	13,323	30.4%
Wa	12,550	28.6%
Hani	1129	2.6%
Yi	415	0.9%
Dai	8657	19.8%
Hui	124	0.3%
Other	86	0.2%

== Tourist attractions ==
The county is rich in Buddhist traditions. Laojiemian Temple (老街缅寺), Chengzimian Temple (城子缅寺), Xiachengmian Temple (下城缅寺) are major Buddhist temples in the town.

Xiayun Christ Church (下允基督教堂) is a church in the town.

The White Pagoda (白塔) is a popular attraction.

== Education ==
- Lancang No. 2 High School

== Hospital ==
- Lancang No. 2 People's Hospital

== Transportation ==
The China National Highway 214 passes across the town north to south.
