= Ankang Wa Ethnic Township =

Ankang Wa Ethnic Township 安康佤族乡
- Ethnic township
- Location in Yunnan.
- Coordinates: 23°10′54″N 99°45′14″E
- Country: People's Republic of China
- Province: Yunnan
- Prefecture-level city: Pu'er City
- Autonomous county: Lancang Lahu Autonomous County

Area
  - Total: 179 km^{2} (69 sq mi)
- Elevation: 1,800 m (5,900 ft)

Population (2017)
  - Total: 12,772
  - Density: 71.4/km^{2} (185/sq mi)
- Time zone: UTC+08:00 (China Standard)
- Postal code: 665609
- Area code: 0879

Ankang Wa Ethnic Township (simplified Chinese: 安康佤族乡; traditional Chinese: 安康佤族鄉; pinyin: Ānkāng Wǎzú Xiāng) is an ethnic township in Lancang Lahu Autonomous County, Yunnan, China. As of the 2017 census it had a population of 12,772 and an area of 179-square-kilometre (69 sq mi).

== Administrative division ==
As of 2016, the township is divided into five villages:

- Shangzhai (上寨村)
- Ankang (安康村)
- Nanshan (南栅村)
- Nuobo (糯波村)
- Xiaobanba (小班坝村)

== Geography ==
Ankang Wa Ethnic Township is situated at northwestern Lancang Lahu Autonomous County. The township is bordered to the northwest by Cangyuan Va Autonomous County, to the east and southeast by Shangyun Town, to the south by Mujia Township, and to the west by Xuelin Wa Ethnic Township.

The highest point in the township is Little Xinzhai Liangzi (小新寨梁子), which, at 2,395 metres (7,858 ft) above sea level.

== Economy ==
The township's economy is based on nearby mineral resources and agricultural resources. Commercial crops include tea, sugarcane, and walnut. The region abounds with iron, lead, and tin.

== Transportation ==
The National Highway G214 passes across the township north to south.
