= Mujia Township =

Mujia Township 木戛乡
- Township

Tai Nuea transcription(s)
  - Tai Le: ᥛᥫᥒᥰ ᥐᥣᥐᥱ
- Etymology: ᥛᥫᥒᥰ ᥐᥣᥐᥱ ("place like a spoon")
- Location in Yunnan.
- Coordinates: 22°59′31″N 99°38′04″E
- Country: People's Republic of China
- Province: Yunnan
- Prefecture-level city: Pu'er City
- Autonomous county: Lancang Lahu Autonomous County

Area
  - Total: 278 km^{2} (107 sq mi)

Population (2017)
  - Total: 16,113
  - Density: 58.0/km^{2} (150/sq mi)
- Time zone: UTC+08:00 (China Standard)
- Postal code: 665605
- Area code: 0879

Mujia Township (simplified Chinese: 木戛乡; traditional Chinese: 木戛鄉; pinyin: Mùjiā Xiāng; Tai Nüa: ᥛᥫᥒᥰ ᥐᥣᥐᥱ) is a township in Lancang Lahu Autonomous County, Yunnan, China. As of the 2017 census it had a population of 16,113 and an area of 278-square-kilometre (107 sq mi).

== Etymology ==
"Mujia" is a Tai Nuea language name, which means "place like a spoon", written in Tai Le script as ᥛᥫᥒᥰ ᥐᥣᥐᥱ. The original pronunciation is "Mengga", but now evolved to "Mujia". Another said, "Mujia" is a Wa language name, which means "place with many of wild ginger", and written in Wa language as "ndaex glag".

== Administrative division ==
As of 2016, the township is divided into six villages:

- Bangli (邦利村)
- Mengnuo (勐糯村)
- Haboma (哈卜吗村)
- Laba (拉巴村)
- Nanliu (南六村)
- Fujiao (富角村)

== Geography ==
The township is situated at northwestern Lancang Lahu Autonomous County. The township shares a border with Xuelin Wa Ethnic Township to the west, Shangyun Town and Fubang Township to the east, Ankang Wa Ethnic Township to the north, and Zhutang Township to the south.

There are four major streams in the township, namely the Nanjia Stream (南戛河), Napi Stream (拿丕河), Nanla Stream (南拉河), and Waluoma Stream (瓦洛吗河). They are tributaries of the Black River (黑河).

The highest point in the township is Hanima Mountain (哈尼吗山), which, at 2,314 metres (7,592 ft) above sea level.

== Economy ==
The economy of the township is largest based on agriculture, including farming and pig-breeding. The main crops of the region are grain, followed by corn and wheat. Commercial crops include tea and beans.

== Demographics ==
Population census
Year	Pop.	±%
2004	16,589	—
2017	16,113	−2.9%

As of 2017, the National Bureau of Statistics of China estimates the township's population now to be 16,113.

Ethnic groups in 2004
Ethnicity	Population	Percentage
Lahu	16,210	97.7%
Han	321	1.9%
Other	58	0.3%

== Transportation ==
The National Highway G214 passes across the township.
