= Fazhanhe Hani Ethnic Township =

Fazhanhe Hani Ethnic Township 发展河哈尼族乡
- Ethnic township
- Location in Yunnan.
- Coordinates: 22°20′04″N 100°10′24″E
- Country: People's Republic of China
- Province: Yunnan
- Prefecture-level city: Pu'er City
- Autonomous county: Lancang Lahu Autonomous County
- Incorporated (township): 1988

Area
  - Total: 486 km^{2} (188 sq mi)

Population (2017)
  - Total: 15,884
  - Density: 32.7/km^{2} (84.6/sq mi)
- Time zone: UTC+08:00 (China Standard)
- Postal code: 665622
- Area code: 0879

Fazhanhe Hani Ethnic Township (simplified Chinese: 发展河哈尼族乡; traditional Chinese: 發展河哈尼族鄉; pinyin: Fāzhǎnhé Hānízú Xiāng) is an ethnic township in Lancang Lahu Autonomous County, Yunnan, China. As of the 2017 census it had a population of 15,884 and an area of 486-square-kilometre (188 sq mi).

== Etymology ==
The township named after Fazhan River (发展河), which flows through the region.

== Administrative division ==
As of 2016, the township is divided into four villages:

- Fazhanhe (发展河村)
- Mengnai (勐乃村)
- Heishan (黑山村)
- Yingpan (营盘村)

== History ==
Formerly known as "Yingpan District" (营盘区), it came under the jurisdiction of Dayakou Tudusi (大雅口土都司) in the Qing dynasty (1644–1911).

In 1940, it belonged to the 3rd District and then became Xinya Township (新雅乡).

In 1949, it was under the jurisdiction of Ningjiang County (宁江县). After Ningjiang County was revoked in 1953, it was renamed "Yingpan District". In 1971 its name was changed to "Yingpan Commune" (营盘公社). It was formed as a township in 1988.

== Geography ==
The township is situated at southeastern Lancang Lahu Autonomous County. It borders Nuozhadu Town in the north and northeast, Town in the east, Menghai County in the south and east, Huimin Town in the southwest, and Jiujing Hani Ethnic Township in the west.

There are over five rivers and streams in the township, such as Fazhan River (发展河), Mengsong River (勐宋河), Manghong River (芒红河), Nankang River (南抗河), and Mengnai River (勐乃河).

== Economy ==
The economy of the township is mainly based on agriculture, including farming and pig-breeding. Tea, sugarcane, and fruit are the economic plants of this region.

== Demographics ==
Population census
Year	Pop.	±%
2004	15,215	—
2017	15,884	+4.4%

As of 2017, the National Bureau of Statistics of China estimates the township's population now to be 15,884.

Ethnic groups in 2004
Ethnicity	Population	Percentage
Hani	5075	33.4%
Lahu	4945	32.5%
Han	4092	26.9%
Yi	842	5.5%
Dai	209	1.4%
Other	52	0.3%

== Transportation ==
The National Highway G214 passes across the township north to south.
