= Laba Township =

Laba Township 拉巴乡
- Township
- Location in Yunnan.
- Coordinates: 22°30′15″N 99°38′01″E
- Country: People's Republic of China
- Province: Yunnan
- Prefecture-level city: Pu'er City
- Autonomous county: Lancang Lahu Autonomous County

Area
  - Total: 323 km^{2} (125 sq mi)

Population (2017)
  - Total: 15,000
  - Density: 46/km^{2} (120/sq mi)
- Time zone: UTC+08:00 (China Standard)
- Postal code: 665617
- Area code: 0879

Laba Township (simplified Chinese: 拉巴乡; traditional Chinese: 拉巴鄉; pinyin: Lābā Xiāng) is a township in Lancang Lahu Autonomous County, Yunnan, China. As of the 2017 census it had a population of 15,000 and an area of 323-square-kilometre (125 sq mi).

== Administrative division ==
As of 2016, the township is divided into six villages:

- Talanong (塔拉弄村)
- Mangdong (芒东村)
- Xiaolaba (小拉巴村)
- Nanpan (南畔村)
- Yintong (音同村)
- Nanlie (南列村)

== History ==
After the founding of the Communist State in 1949, Ximeng District (西盟区) was set up. It was renamed "Laba District" (拉巴区) in 1953. During the Great Leap Forward, its name was changed to "Laba Commune" (拉巴公社) in 1958 and then Xiangdong Commune (向东公社) in 1969. It was incorporated as a township in 1988.

== Geography ==
The township is located in southwestern Lancang Lahu Autonomous County. It borders Zhutang Township in the north, Ximeng County and Menglian County in the west, Donghui Town in the south, and Menglang Town in the east.

There are mainly three rivers in the township, namely the Nanluo River (南倮河), Nannong River (南弄河) and Nanpan River (南畔河).

== Economy ==
The township's economy is based on nearby mineral resources and agricultural resources. The region abounds with manganese, lead, zinc, and copper. The main crops of the region are grain, followed by corn and wheat. Economic crops are mainly tea and fruit.

== Demographics ==
Population census
Year	Pop.	±%
2004	13,087	—
2017	15,000	+14.6%

As of 2017, the National Bureau of Statistics of China estimates the township's population now to be 15,000.

Ethnic groups in 2004
Ethnicity	Population	Percentage
Lahu	8831	67.5%
Han	2057	15.7%
Wa	1146	8.8%
Yi	113	0.9%
Hani	816	6.2%
Other	124	0.9%

== Transportation ==
The Provincial Highway S320 winds through the township.
