= Qianliu Yi Ethnic Township =

Qianliu Yi Ethnic Township 谦六彝族乡
- Ethnic township
- Location in Yunnan.
- Coordinates: 22°53′51″N 100°10′38″E
- Country: People's Republic of China
- Province: Yunnan
- Prefecture-level city: Pu'er City
- Autonomous county: Lancang Lahu Autonomous County
- Incorporated (township): 1940

Area
  - Total: 896 km^{2} (346 sq mi)

Population (2017)
  - Total: 43,031
  - Density: 48.0/km^{2} (124/sq mi)
- Time zone: UTC+08:00 (China Standard)
- Postal code: 665628
- Area code: 0879

Qianliu Yi Ethnic Township (simplified Chinese: 谦六彝族乡; traditional Chinese: 謙六彝族鄉; pinyin: Qiānliù Yízú Xiāng) is an ethnic township in Lancang Lahu Autonomous County, Yunnan, China. As of the 2017 census it had a population of 43,031 and an area of 896-square-kilometre (346 sq mi).

== Administrative division ==
As of 2016, the township is divided into fifteen villages:

- Qiannuo (谦糯村)
- Zhanai (乍乃村)
- Daqiaotou (大桥头村)
- Xinzhai (新寨村)
- Mangnong (芒弄村)
- Tianba (田坝村)
- Dagang (打岗村)
- Longtan (龙潭村)
- Xincheng (新城村)
- Heping (和平村)
- Shuiyuan (水源村)
- Malihe (麻栗河村)
- Xiaofofang (小佛房村)
- Lasa (腊撒村)
- Pingzhang (平掌村)

== History ==
As a communication hub in Lancang Lahu Autonomous County, the township was even a place of strategic importance during the Qing dynasty (1644–1911) and Republic of China (1912-1949).

In 1940, Mangnuo Township (芒糯乡) was set up. In 1948, it was renamed "Qianliu Township".

After the establishment of the Communist State, its name was changed to "Qianliu District" (谦六区). In 1969 it was renamed "Yuejin Commune" (跃进公社), named after the Great Leap Forward. And it was renamed "Qianliu Commune" in 1971. In 1988, the Qianliu Yi Ethnic Township was officially incorporated.

== Geography ==
The township is situated at northeastern Lancang Lahu Autonomous County. It is surrounded by Dashan Township on the north, Donghe Township and Nanling Township on the west, Jinggu Dai and Yi Autonomous County on the east, and Nuozhadu Town on the south.

The highest point in the township is the Black Mountain (黑山) which stands 2,516 metres (8,255 ft) above sea level. The lowest point is the Mengsa Farm (勐撒农场), which, at 640 metres (2,100 ft) above sea level.

The Lancang River flows through the township. Other rivers and streams include Mangpa River (芒帕河) and Mengsa River (勐撤河).

== Economy ==
The local economy is primarily based upon agriculture and local industry. Industry is mainly based on wine-making and ceramics. The region abounds with iron, copper, and manganese. Significant crops include grain, corn, peanut, sugarcane, tea, and coffee bean.

== Demographics ==
Population census
Year	Pop.	±%
2004	20,532	—
2017	43,031	+109.6%

As of 2017, the National Bureau of Statistics of China estimates the township's population now to be 43,031.

Ethnic groups in 2004
Ethnicity	Population	Percentage
Hani	563	2.7%
Lahu	5159	25.1%
Han	4931	24.0%
Wa	696	3.4%
Yi	7364	35.9%
Dai	391	1.9%
Blang	1265	6.2%
Hui	157	0.8%
Other	6	0.03%
