= Nanling Township, Lancang County =

Nanling Township 南岭乡
- Township
- Location in Yunnan.
- Coordinates: 22°42′42″N 99°59′44″E
- Country: People's Republic of China
- Province: Yunnan
- Prefecture-level city: Pu'er City
- Autonomous county: Lancang Lahu Autonomous County
- Incorporated (township): 1940

Area
  - Total: 471 km^{2} (182 sq mi)

Population (2017)
  - Total: 24,059
  - Density: 51.1/km^{2} (132/sq mi)
- Time zone: UTC+08:00 (China Standard)
- Postal code: 665613
- Area code: 0879

Nanling Township (simplified Chinese: 南岭乡; traditional Chinese: 南嶺鄉; pinyin: Nánlǐng Xiāng) is a township in Lancang Lahu Autonomous County, Yunnan, China. As of the 2017 census it had a population of 24,059 and an area of 471-square-kilometre (182 sq mi).

== Administrative division ==
As of 2016, the township is divided into eight villages:

- Huanghui (黄回村)
- Mangnong (芒弄村)
- Mengbing (勐炳村)
- Xiananxian (下南现村)
- Qianzhe (谦哲村)
- Mangfu (芒付村)
- Mengkan (勐坎村)
- Mali (麻栗村)

== History ==
In 1940, it belonged to the 4th District and then the Daling Township (大岭乡).

After the founding of the Communist State in 1949, Nanling District (南岭区) was set up. During the Great Leap Forward, its name was changed to Wensheng Commune (文胜公社) in 1969 and then Nanling Commune (南岭公社) in 1971. It was incorporated as a township in 1988.

== Geography ==
It lies at the central of Lancang Lahu Autonomous County, bordering Zhutang Township to the west, Menglang Town to the southwest, Nuozhadu Town to the south, Fubang Township and Donghe Township to the north, and Qianliu Yi Ethnic Township to the east.

There are major four rivers and streams in the township, namely the Mangnong River (芒弄河), Qianzhe River (谦哲河), Mengkan River (勐坎河), and the Black River (黑河).

== Economy ==
The economy is supported primarily by farming, ranching and forestry. Economic crops are mainly peanut, tea, fruit, and bean.

== Demographics ==
Population census
| Year | Pop. | ±% |
|---|---|---|
| 2004 | 20,339 | — |
| 2017 | 24,059 | +18.3% |

As of 2017, the National Bureau of Statistics of China estimates the township's population now to be 24,059.

Ethnic groups in 2004
| Ethnicity | Population | Percentage |
|---|---|---|
| Lahu | 12424 | 61.1% |
| Han | 6900 | 33.9% |
| Wa | 1405 | 9.8% |
| Yi | 816 | 4.0% |
| Hani | 114 | 0.6% |
| Other | 85 | 0.4% |
