= Xuelin Wa Ethnic Township =

Xuelin Wa Ethnic Township 雪林佤族乡
- Ethnic township
- Location in Yunnan.
- Coordinates: 23°01′31″N 99°33′30″E
- Country: People's Republic of China
- Province: Yunnan
- Prefecture-level city: Pu'er City
- Autonomous county: Lancang Lahu Autonomous County

Area
  - Total: 247.11 km^{2} (95.41 sq mi)

Population (2017)
  - Total: 12,738
  - Density: 51.548/km^{2} (133.51/sq mi)
- Time zone: UTC+08:00 (China Standard)
- Postal code: 665605
- Area code: 0879

Xuelin Wa Ethnic Township (simplified Chinese: 雪林佤族乡; traditional Chinese: 雪林佤族鄉; pinyin: Xuělín Wǎzú Xiāng) is an ethnic township in Lancang Lahu Autonomous County, Yunnan, China. As of the 2017 census it had a population of 12,738 and an area of 247.11-square-kilometre (95.41 sq mi).

== Administrative division ==
As of 2016, the township is divided into seven villages:

- Xuelin (雪林村)
- Mangdeng (芒登村)
- Xiaomangling (小芒令村)
- Nanpan (南盼村)
- Zuodu (左都村)
- Damangling (大芒令村)
- Yongguang (永广村)

== Geography ==
The Xuelin Wa Ethnic Township is a border township lies at the northwestern Lancang Lahu Autonomous County. The township shares a border with Mongmao Township of Myanmar to the west, Mujia Township to the east, Cangyuan Va Autonomous County to the north, and Ximeng Va Autonomous County to the south.

The Gelang River (格浪河) and Gelang Longdai River (格浪龙代河) flow through the township.

== Economy ==
The region's economy is based on agriculture. The main crops of the region are grain, followed by corn and buckwheat.

== Demographics ==
Population census
Year	Pop.	±%
2004	12,003	—
2017	12,738	+6.1%

As of 2017, the National Bureau of Statistics of China estimates the township's population now to be 12,738.

Ethnic groups in 2004
Ethnicity	Population	Percentage
Lahu	391	3.3%
Han	50	0.4%
Wa	11507	95.9%
Other	55	0.5%

== Transportation ==
The National Highway G214 passes across the township north to south.
