= Fubang Township =

Fubang Township 富邦乡
- Township
- Location in Yunnan.
- Coordinates: 22°54′17″N 99°48′13″E
- Country: People's Republic of China
- Province: Yunnan
- Prefecture-level city: Pu'er City
- Autonomous county: Lancang Lahu Autonomous County
- Incorporated (township): 1940

Area
  - Total: 332 km^{2} (128 sq mi)

Population (2017)
  - Total: 21,000
  - Density: 63/km^{2} (160/sq mi)
- Time zone: UTC+08:00 (China Standard)
- Postal code: 665604
- Area code: 0879

Fubang Township (simplified Chinese: 富邦乡; traditional Chinese: 富邦鄉; pinyin: Fùbāng Xiāng) is a township in Lancang Lahu Autonomous County, Yunnan, China. As of the 2017 census it had a population of 21,000 and an area of 332-square-kilometre (128 sq mi).

== Etymology ==
The name "Fubang" (富邦) comes from the first word of the village name "Fuyong" (富永) and "Bangnai" (邦奈).

== Administrative division ==
As of 2016, the township is divided into eight villages:

- Fuyong (富永村)
- Saihan (赛罕村)
- Banshan (半山村)
- Ping'an (平安村)
- Duoyilin (多依林村)
- Bangnai (邦奈村)
- Maliping (麻栗坪村)
- Kalang (佧朗村)

== History ==
In the Qing dynasty (1644–1911), it came under the jurisdiction of Tusi (土司).

In 1940, it belonged to the 5th District. That same year, the 5th District was revoked and Fubang Township was set up.

After the founding of the Communist State in 1949, the Fubang District (富邦区) was set up. It was merged into Shangyun District (上允区) in 1958 and restored in 1961. During the Great Leap Forward, it was renamed "Jingfeng Commune" (经锋公社) in 1969 and then "Fubang Commune" (富邦公社) in 1971. It was incorporated as a township in 1988.

== Geography ==
It lies at the central Lancang Lahu Autonomous County, bordering Zhutang Township to the west, Nanling Township to the south, Shangyun Town and Mujia Township to the north, and Donghe Township to the east.

The Yilin River (依林河) and Ankang River (安康河) flow through the township.

== Economy ==
The economy of the township is mainly based on agriculture. Economic crops are mainly corn, wheat, peanut, and tea.

== Demographics ==
Population census
| Year | Pop. | ±% |
|---|---|---|
| 2004 | 20,744 | — |
| 2017 | 21,000 | +1.2% |

As of 2017, the National Bureau of Statistics of China estimates the township's population now to be 21,000.

Ethnic groups in 2004
| Ethnicity | Population | Percentage |
|---|---|---|
| Lahu | 17348 | 83.6% |
| Han | 3323 | 16.0% |
| Other | 73 | 0.4% |

== Transportation ==
The National Highway G214 winds through the township.
