= Huimin, Lancang County =

Huimin Town 惠民镇
- Town
- Location in Yunnan.
- Coordinates: 22°15′44″N 100°04′49″E
- Country: People's Republic of China
- Province: Yunnan
- Prefecture-level city: Pu'er City
- Autonomous county: Lancang Lahu Autonomous County
- Incorporated (township): 1984
- Designated (ethnic township): 1988
- Designated (town): 28 December 2012

Area
  - Total: 394 km^{2} (152 sq mi)

Population (2018)
  - Total: 17,000
  - Density: 43/km^{2} (110/sq mi)
- Time zone: UTC+08:00 (China Standard)
- Postal code: 665600
- Area code: 0879

Huimin (simplified Chinese: 惠民镇; traditional Chinese: 惠民鎮; pinyin: Huìmín Zhèn) is a town in Lancang Lahu Autonomous County, Yunnan, China. As of the 2018 census it had a population of 17,000 and an area of 394-square-kilometre (152 sq mi).

== Administrative division ==
As of 2016, the town is divided into five villages:

- Hanguping (旱谷坪村)
- Fula (富腊村)
- Mangyun (芒云村)
- Jingmai (景迈村)
- Mangjing (芒景村)

== History ==
It was incorporated as a township in 1984. It officially designated an "ethnic township" until an administrative reorganisation in 1988. On December 28, 2012, it was upgraded to a town.

== Geography ==
The town is located in southeastern Lancang Lahu Autonomous County, which known as the "South Gate" of the county. It is surrounded by Jiujing Hani Ethnic Township on the north, Nuofu Township on the west, Fazhanhe Hani Ethnic Township on the east, and Menghai County on the south.

The town a mountainous area. Mount Kongming (孔明山) is situated at the northern town, which stands 1,466 metres (4,810 ft) above sea level. Mount Mala (马拉山) and Mount Fulahou (付腊后山) in the east are 1,671 metres (5,482 ft) and 1,781 metres (5,843 ft) above sea level respectively, among which Mount Fulahou is the highest mountain in the town. Mount Guangmenggen (广勐根) lies in the west, which, at 1,589 metres (5,213 ft) above sea level.

There are several rivers and streams in the town, such as Nanlang River (南朗河), Nanwang River (南往河), Fula River (付腊河), Nanmen River (南门河), Menglei River (勐垒河), Mangqing River (芒青河), and Nanxiong River (南雄河).

== Economy ==
Agriculture and mineral resources play important roles in the local economy. The main crops of the region are grains and corns. Commercial crops include sugarcane, mango, longan, tea, and natural rubber. The region also has an abundance of iron, coal, manganese, and limestone.

== Demographics ==
Population census
Year	Pop.	±%
2004	14,239	—
2018	17,000	+19.4%

As of 2018, the National Bureau of Statistics of China estimates the town's population now to be 17,000.

Ethnic groups in 2004
Ethnicity	Population	Percentage
Hani	5545	38.9%
Lahu	1246	8.8%
Bulang	2266	15.9%
Dai	2340	16.4%
Han	2291	16.1%
Wa	384	2.7%
Other	167	1.2%

== Tourist attractions ==
An ancient tea garden is a popular attraction in the town.

== Transportation ==
The China National Highway 214 passes across the town north to south.
