= Nuozhadu =

Nuozhadu Town 糯扎渡镇
- Town
- Location in Yunnan.
- Coordinates: 22°34′47″N 100°32′07″E
- Country: People's Republic of China
- Province: Yunnan
- Prefecture-level city: Pu'er City
- Autonomous county: Lancang Lahu Autonomous County
- Incorporated (township): 1940
- Designated (town): 2006

Area
  - Total: 937 km^{2} (362 sq mi)
- Elevation: 1,120 m (3,670 ft)

Population (2017)
  - Total: 30,419
  - Density: 32.5/km^{2} (84.1/sq mi)
- Time zone: UTC+08:00 (China Standard)
- Postal code: 665614
- Area code: 0879

Nuozhadu (simplified Chinese: 糯扎渡镇; traditional Chinese: 糯扎渡鎮; pinyin: Nuòzhādù Zhèn) is a town in Lancang Lahu Autonomous County, Yunnan, China. As of the 2017 census it had a population of 30,419 and an area of 937-square-kilometre (362 sq mi).

== Administrative division ==
As of 2016, the town is divided into ten villages:

- Yaofangba (窑房坝村)
- Yakou (雅口村)
- Nanxian (南现村)
- Huangbahe (荒坝河村)
- Mengkuang (勐矿村)
- Xiangshuihe (响水河村)
- Biandanshan (扁担山村)
- Longshan (龙山村)
- Luoshuidong (落水洞村)
- Qianmai (谦迈村)

== History ==
In the Qing dynasty (1644–1911), it came under the jurisdiction of Dayakou Tusi (大雅口土司).

In 1940, it belonged to the 3rd District. That same year, the 3rd District was revoked and it belonged to Xinya Township (新雅乡).

In 1949, it came under the jurisdiction of Ningjiang County (宁江县). In 1953, Ningjiang County was revoked and Yakou District (雅口区) was set up. In 1969 it was renamed "Xianfeng Commune" (先锋公社) and then "Yakou Commune" (雅口公社) in 1971. In 1988, Yakou Township (雅口乡) was incorporated. In 1998, China and the Netherlands have set up "Nuozhadu Provincial Nature Reserve" in the region to protect wild animal. In January 2006, the villages of Longshan (竜山村), Qianmai (谦迈村) and Luoshuidong (落水洞村) were merged into Nuozhadu and it was upgraded to a town.

== Geography ==
The town is situated at eastern Lancang Lahu Autonomous County. It borders Nanling Township and Qianliu Yi Ethnic Township in the north, Simaogang Town in the east, Fazhanhe Hani Ethnic Township and Menghai County in the south, and Menglang Town in the west.

The town experiences a subtropical mountain monsoon climate, with an average annual temperature of 38 °C (100 °F), total annual rainfall of 1,500-to-2,000-millimetre (59 to 79 in), a frost-free period of 326 days, and annual average sunshine hours in 2100 hours.

There are nine rivers and streams in the town, such as the Black River (黑河), Qianmai River (谦迈河), Nanting River (南汀河), and Xiangshui River (响水河).

== Economy ==
The economy of the town has a predominantly agricultural orientation, including farming and pig-breeding. Economic crops are mainly peanut, sugarcane, natural rubber, Lanxangia tsaoko, and sweet potato.

The region abounds with gold, lead, and zinc.

== Demographics ==
Population census
Year	Pop.	±%
2004	20,829	—
2017	30,419	+46.0%

As of 2017, the National Bureau of Statistics of China estimates the town's population now to be 30,419.

Ethnic groups in 2004
Ethnicity	Population	Percentage
Hani	2662	12.8%
Lahu	7098	34.1%
Han	4974	23.9%
Wa	426	2.0%
Yi	4530	21.7%
Dai	551	2.6%
Blang	541	2.6%
Other	47	0.2%

== Tourist attractions ==
Mengkuang Cliff Carvings of the Yuan dynasty (1271–1368) (勐矿元代摩崖) is a provincial cultural relic preservation organ. And Yakou Government Site (雅口新政权遗址) is a county level cultural relic preservation organ.

== Transportation ==
The National Highway G214 passes across the town east to west.
