= Dashan Township, Lancang County =

Dashan Township 大山乡
- Township
- Etymology: 大山, Dàshān ("a huge mountain")
- Location in Yunnan.
- Coordinates: 23°00′27″N 100°06′34″E
- Country: People's Republic of China
- Province: Yunnan
- Prefecture-level city: Pu'er City
- Autonomous county: Lancang Lahu Autonomous County
- Incorporated (township): 1988

Area
  - Total: 233 km^{2} (90 sq mi)

Population (2017)
  - Total: 16,281
  - Density: 69.9/km^{2} (181/sq mi)
- Time zone: UTC+08:00 (China Standard)
- Postal code: 665600
- Area code: 0879

Dashan Township (simplified Chinese: 大山乡; traditional Chinese: 大山鄉; pinyin: Dàshān Xiāng) is a township in Lancang Lahu Autonomous County, Yunnan, China. As of the 2017 census it had a population of 16,281 and an area of 233-square-kilometre (90 sq mi).

== Administrative division ==
As of 2016, the township is divided into eight villages:

- Dashan (大山村)
- Banpo (半坡村)
- Youzhafang (油榨房村)
- Pingtian (平田村)
- Manghai (芒海村)
- Tuanshan (团山村)
- Nanmei (南美村)
- Nandeba (南德坝村)

== History ==
In the Republic of China, it belonged to the Banghai Township (邦海乡) and Daling Township (大岭乡).

After establishment of the Communist State, in 1950, the Dashan District (大山区) was set up. It was merged into Donghe District (东河区) in 1958. In 1984, Dashan District was demerged from Donghe District. It was incorporated officially as a township in 1988.

== Geography ==
The township is located in northeastern Lancang Lahu Autonomous County. It is surrounded by Jinggu Dai and Yi Autonomous County on the northeast, Fudong Township on the northwest, Qianliu Yi Ethnic Township on the southeast, and Donghe Township on the southwest.

The highest point in the township is the Baishantoujian Mountain (白石头尖山) which stands 2,489 metres (8,166 ft) above sea level. The lowest point is Liangshuijing (凉水箐), which, at 750 metres (2,460 ft) above sea level.

The Manghai River (茫海河) flows through the township.

== Economy ==
The township's economy is based on nearby mineral resources and agricultural resources. The main crops of the region are grains, followed by corn and wheat. Economic crops are mainly camellia oleifera, tea, castanea mollissima, and coffee bean. The region abounds with iron, manganese, tin, copper, lead, zinc, and limestone.

== Demographics ==
Population census
Year	Pop.	±%
2004	17,974	—
2017	16,281	−9.4%

As of 2017, the National Bureau of Statistics of China estimates the township's population now to be 16,281.

Ethnic groups in 2004
Ethnicity	Population	Percentage
Lahu	6275	34.9%
Han	6170	34.3%
Wa	421	2.3%
Yi	4113	22.9%
Hui	495	2.8%
Dai	307	1.7%
Blang	110	0.6%
Other	83	0.5%
