= Donghui, Lancang County =

Donghui Town 东回镇
- Town
- Location in Yunnan.
- Coordinates: 22°26′26″N 99°48′00″E
- Country: People's Republic of China
- Province: Yunnan
- Prefecture-level city: Pu'er City
- Autonomous county: Lancang Lahu Autonomous County
- Incorporated (township): 1988
- Designated (town): 2012

Area
  - Total: 330 km^{2} (130 sq mi)

Population (2018)
  - Total: 13,487
  - Density: 41/km^{2} (110/sq mi)
- Time zone: UTC+08:00 (China Standard)
- Postal code: 665616
- Area code: 0879

Donghui (simplified Chinese: 东回镇; traditional Chinese: 東回鎮; pinyin: Dōnghuí Zhèn) is a town in Lancang Lahu Autonomous County, Yunnan, China. As of the 2018 census it had a population of 13,487 and an area of 330-square-kilometre (130 sq mi).

== Administrative division ==
As of 2016, the town is divided into six villages:

- Donggang (东岗村)
- Ayong (阿永村)
- Banli (班利村)
- Huinong (回弄村)
- Nanweng (南翁村)
- Gaixin (改新村)

== History ==
In the Qing dynasty (1644–1911), it came under the jurisdiction of Mengbin Tusi (勐滨土司).

During the Republic of China (1912-1949), it belonged to Donglang Township (东朗乡).

In 1949, the Donghui District (东回区) was set up. It was renamed Hongwei Commune (红卫公社) in 1969 and was changed to Donghui Commune (东回公社) in 1972. It was incorporated as a township in 1988. On December 28, 2012, it was upgraded to a town.

== Geography ==
It lies at the southwestern of Lancang Lahu Autonomous County, bordering Menglian Dai, Lahu and Va Autonomous County to the west, Nuofu Township to the south, Laba Township to the north, and Menglang Town to the east.

The Dongjiao River (东角河), Nanhong River (南哄河) and Nange River (南格河) flow through the town.

== Economy ==
The region's economy is based on agriculture and pig-breeding. Significant crops include grains, corns, and buckwheats.

== Demographics ==
Population census
| Year | Pop. | ±% |
|---|---|---|
| 2004 | 14,249 | — |
| 2018 | 13,487 | −5.3% |

As of 2018, the National Bureau of Statistics of China estimates the town's population now to be 13,487.

Ethnic groups in 2004
| Ethnicity | Population | Percentage |
|---|---|---|
| Hani | 2898 | 20.3% |
| Lahu | 8338 | 58.5% |
| Han | 1025 | 7.2% |
| Wa | 1848 | 13.0% |
| Other | 140 | 1.0% |

== Transportation ==
The Provincial Highway S309 passes across the town northeast to southwest.
