= Tai Nuea language =

Kra–Dai language spoken in Southeast Asia

Tai Nuea
- ᥖᥭᥰ ᥘᥫᥴ / ᥖᥭᥰ ᥢᥫᥴ; Tai Le / Tai Ne
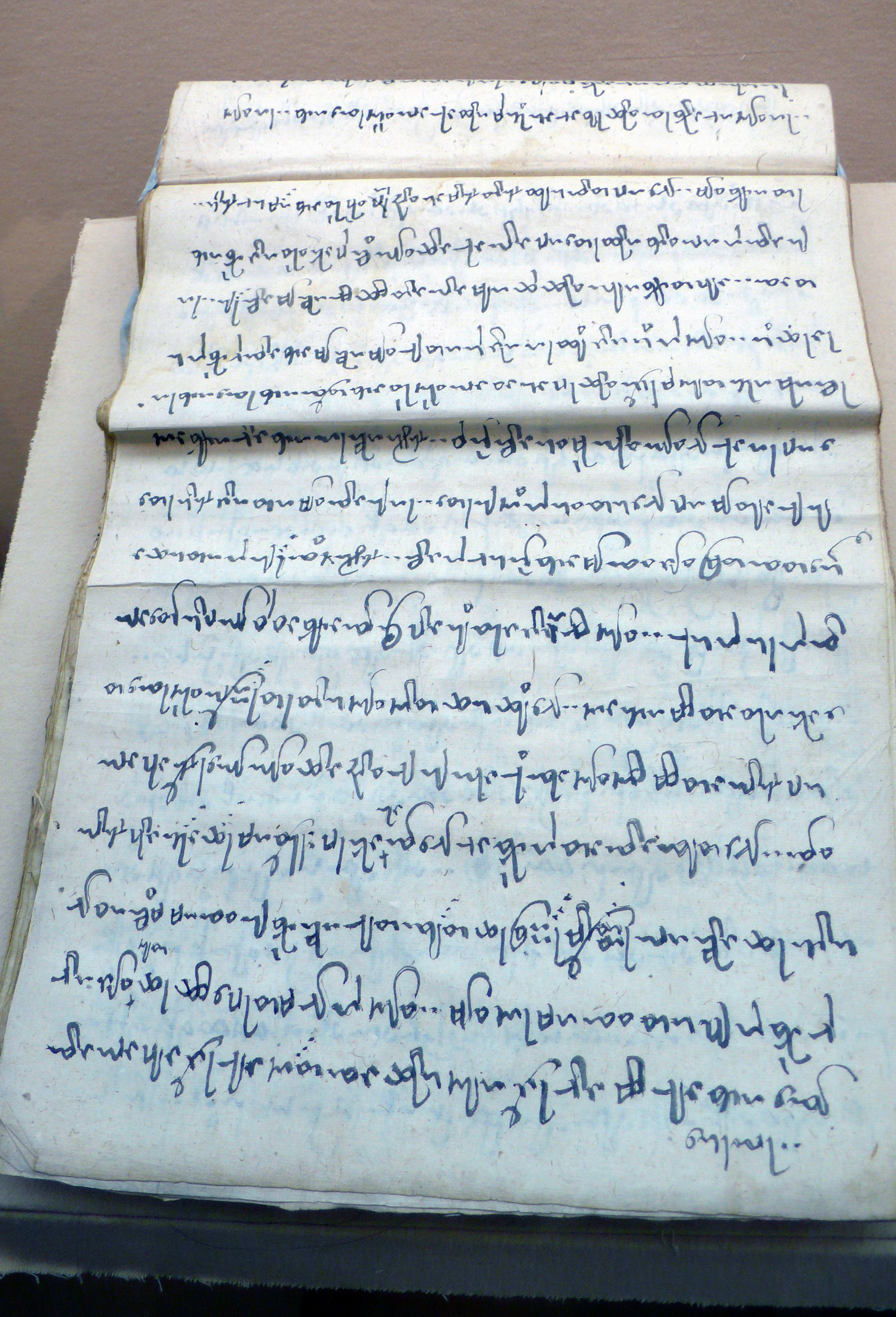
- Buddhist scriptures in Tai Nuea
- Pronunciation: [tai˥.lə˧˥] (Mangshi) or [tɑi˥˧.nə˥] (Menglian)
- Native to: China, Myanmar, Thailand, Laos
- Region: Southwest China
- Ethnicity: Tai Nua, Dai
- Native speakers: (720,000 cited 1983–2007)
- Language family: Kra–Dai: Tai; Southwestern (Thai); Northwestern; Tai Nuea
- Writing system: Tai Le script

Official status
- Official language in: China (Dehong, co-official)

Language codes
- ISO 639-3: tdd
- Glottolog: tain1252 Tai Nua
- ELP: Tai Neua
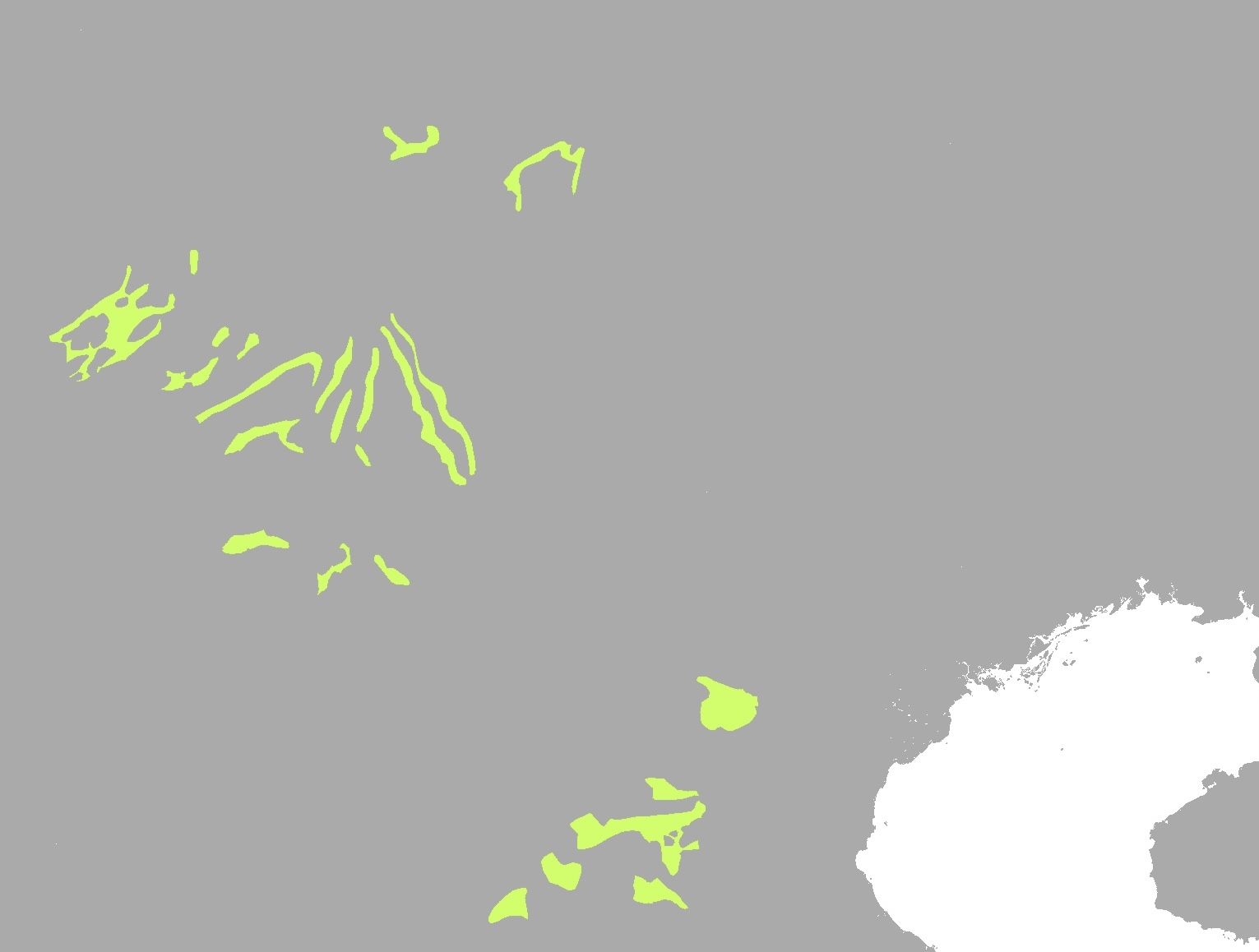

Tai Nuea or Tai Nüa (ᥖᥭᥰ ᥘᥫᥴ, pronounced [tai˥.lə˧˥] (Mangshi) or ᥖᥭᥰ ᥢᥫᥴ, [tɑi˥˧.nə˥] (Menglian); Chinese: 傣那语; pinyin: Dǎinàyǔ; တဲးနိူဝ်, တႆးၼိူဝ်; Burmese: တိုင်းနေ; Thai: ภาษาไทเหนือ, pronounced [pʰāːsǎː tʰāj nɯ̌a]), also called Dehong Tai (Chinese: 德宏傣语; pinyin: Déhóng Dǎiyǔ; Thai: ภาษาไทใต้คง, pronounced [pʰāːsǎː tʰāj tâːj.kʰōŋ]) and Chinese Shan, is one of the languages spoken by the Dai people in China, especially in the Dehong Dai and Jingpo Autonomous Prefecture in the southwest of Yunnan Province. It is closely related to the other Tai languages and could be considered a dialect of Shan. It should not be confused with Tai Lü (Xishuangbanna Dai).

== Names ==
Most Tai Nuea people call themselves Tai Le (ᥖᥭᥰ ᥘᥫᥴ, Tai Nüa pronunciation: [tai˥.lə˧]), which means 'Upper Tai' or 'Northern Tai'. However, it is not related to Tai Lue, which is pronounced [tai˥.lɯ˥˧] in Tai Nuea. This similarity occurs as the result of a merger between [l] and [n] on initial position in the Mangshi dialect of Tai Nuea. It is pronounced Tai Ne (ᥖᥭᥰ ᥢᥫᥴ, [tɑi˥˧.nə˥]) in Menglian dialect.

Another autonym is [tai˥ taɯ˧˩ xoŋ˥] (ᥖᥭᥰ ᥖᥬᥲ ᥑᥨᥒᥰ), where [taɯ˧˩] means 'bottom, under, the lower part (of)' and [xoŋ˥] means 'the Hong River' (Luo 1998). Dehong is a transliteration of the term [taɯ˧˩ xoŋ˥]. It should not be confused with the term ᥖᥭᥰ ᥖᥬᥲ ([tai˥ taɯ˧˩] or [tɑi˥˧ tɑ˩]) 'Lower Tai' which is a term used by the Tai Nuea people to refer to Shan people.

The language is also known as Tai Mau, Tai Kong and Tai Na (傣那语).

== Dialects ==
Zhou (2001:13) classifies Tai Nuea into the Dehong (德宏) and Menggeng (孟耿) dialects. Together, they add up to a total of 541,000 speakers.

- Dehong dialect 德宏土语: 332,000 speakers
  - Dehong Prefecture 德宏州: Mangshi 芒市, Yingjiang 盈江, Lianghe 梁河, Longchuan 陇川, Ruili 瑞丽, Wanding 畹町
  - Baoshan District 保山地区: Baoshan 保山, Tengchong 腾冲, Longling 龙陵, Shidian 施甸
- Menggeng dialect 孟耿土语: 209,000 speakers
  - Pu'er City 普洱市 / Simao District 思茅地区: Menglian 孟连, Jinggu 景谷, Lancang 澜沧, Zhenyuan 镇沅, Ximeng 西盟, Jingdong 景东, Simao 思茅, Pu'er 普洱, Mojiang 墨江
  - Baoshan District 保山地区: Changning 昌宁
  - Lincang District 临沧地区: Gengma 耿马, Lincang 临沧, Shuangjiang 双江, Cangyuan 沧源, Yongde 永德, Zhenkang 镇康, Yunxian 云县, Fengqing 风庆. A separate traditional script is still in use in Mengding Township 勐定镇 and Lincang 临沧. It's identical to old Shan Script but different from the one used in the Dehong area — see Zhou (2001:371).

== Phonology ==
Tai Nuea is a tonal language with a very limited inventory of syllables with no consonant clusters. 16 syllable-initial consonants can be combined with 84 syllable finals and six tones.

=== Consonants ===
==== Onset position consonants ====
All consonants of Tai Nuea are permitted in onsets except /n/.

| | | Labial | Alveolar | | Palatal | Velar | Glottal |
| | | Labial | plain | sibilant | Palatal | Velar | Glottal |
|---|---|---|---|---|---|---|---|
| Nasal | | [m] ᥛ | [n] ᥢ | | | [ŋ] ᥒ | |
| Plosive | tenuis | [p] ᥙ | [t] ᥖ | [t͡s] ᥓ | | [k] ᥐ | [ʔ] ᥟ |
| Plosive | aspirated | [pʰ] ᥚ | [tʰ] ᥗ | ([t͡sʰ])* ᥡ | | ([kʰ])* ᥠ | |
| Fricative | | [f] ᥜ | | [s] ᥔ | | [x] ᥑ | [h] ᥞ |
| Approximant | | | [l] ᥘ | | [j] ᥕ | [w] ᥝ | |

Aspiration is contrastive for the bilabial and alveolar plosives. Aspirated consonants typically have a voice onset time of 80 ms compared to 8 ms for un-aspirated consonants.

The glottal stop is typically found before vowel-initial syllables, serving as the onset.

When before the vowels /a, u, o, ɤ, ɯ/, /j/ is in free variation with [ʎ].

Notes:

1. *(kʰ) and (tsʰ) occur in loanwords.

2. The consonant [l] and [n] merged to [l] in the initial position in Mangshi (芒市) dialect but not in Menglian (孟连) dialect.

3. The consonant [pʰ] and [f] merged to [pʰ] in Menglian (孟连) dialect but not in Mangshi (芒市) dialect.

==== Coda position consonants ====
The set of coda consonants is more restricted than the onset consonants.

| | Labial | Alveolar | Palatal | Velar |
|---|---|---|---|---|
| Nasal | [m] ᥛ | [n] ᥢ | | [ŋ] ᥒ |
| Plosive | [p] ᥙ | [t] ᥖ | | [k] ᥐ |
| Approximant | [w] ᥝ | | [j] ᥭ | |

=== Vowels ===
Tai Nuea has ten vowels and 13 diphthongs:

| | Front | Central-Back | Back |
|---|---|---|---|
| High | [i] ⟨◌ᥤ⟩ | [ɯ] ⟨◌ᥪ⟩ | [u] ⟨◌ᥧ⟩ |
| Mid | [e] ⟨◌ᥥ⟩ | [ə] ⟨◌ᥫ⟩ | [o] ⟨◌ᥨ⟩ |
| Low | [ɛ] ⟨◌ᥦ⟩ | [a] ⟨◌⟩ ~ [aː] ⟨◌ᥣ⟩ (Mangshi) [ɑ] ~ [a] (Menglian) | [ɔ] ⟨◌ᥩ⟩ |

==== Diphthong ====
| ◌ IPA: [a] / [ɑ] (closed syllable) | ᥣ IPA: [aː] | ᥤ IPA: [i] | ᥥ IPA: [e] | ᥦ IPA: [ɛ] | ᥧ IPA: [u] | ᥨ IPA: [o] (closed syllable) | ᥩ IPA: [ɔ] | ᥪ IPA: [ɯ] | ᥫ IPA: [ə] |
| ◌ᥭ IPA: [ai] | ᥣᥭ IPA: [aːi] | | | | ᥧᥭ IPA: [ui] | ᥨᥭ IPA: [oi] | ᥩᥭ IPA: [ɔi] | ᥪᥭ IPA: [ɯi] | ᥫᥭ IPA: [əi] |
| ᥝ IPA: [au] | ᥣᥝ IPA: [aːu] | ᥤᥝ IPA: [iu] | ᥥᥝ IPA: [eu] | ᥦᥝ IPA: [ɛu] | | ᥨᥝ IPA: [o] (open syllable) | | ᥪᥝ IPA: [ɯu]* | ᥫᥝ IPA: [əu] |
ᥬ IPA: [aɯ] (Mangshi); IPA: [ɑ] (Menglian)

* Only in Mangshi dialect.

=== Syllable structure ===
Syllables can minimally be CV and maximally be CVV(V) or CVVC. Only the Mangshi dialect allows triphthongs. In Tai Nuea research, syllables ending in an obstruent consonant are called "checked" and those that don't are called "unchecked." These differences matter for the application of tones.

=== Tones ===
==== Unchecked syllables ====
Tai Nuea has six tones:

| Classification | Mangshi | Menglian | Tai Le | Tai Le (1963) | Number |
|---|---|---|---|---|---|
| 阴平 | 35 [˧˥] | 55 [˥] | ◌ᥴ | ◌́ | 1 |
| 阳平 | 55 [˥] | 53 [˥˧] | ◌ᥰ | ◌̈ | 2 |
| 阴上 | 31 [˧˩] | 11 [˩] | ◌ᥲ | ◌̀ | 3 |
| 阳上 | 53 [˥˧] | 31 [˧˩] | ◌ᥳ | ◌̇ | 4 |
| 阴去 | 11 [˩] | 35 [˧˥] | ◌ᥱ | ◌̌ | 5 |
| 阳去 | 33 [˧] | | ◌ | ◌ | 6 |

==== Checked syllables ====
Syllables with [p], [t], and [k] final can have only one of three tones in Mangshi (芒市) Dialect or four tones in Menglian (孟连) Dialect.

Mangshi (芒市) Dialect
| Description | Contour | Tai Le | Tai Le (1963) | Number |
|---|---|---|---|---|
| rising | 35 [˧˥] | ◌ᥴ | ◌́ | 7 |
| high falling | 53 [˥˧] | ◌ᥳ | ◌̇ | 8 |
| high falling | 53 [˥˧] | ◌ | ◌ | 8 |
| low | 11 [˩] or 21 [˨˩] | ◌ᥱ | ◌̌ | 9 |

In Mangshi (芒市) Dialect, the high falling tone mark (◌ᥳ) is usually left unmarked.

Menglian (孟连) Dialect
| Description | Contour | Tai Le | Tai Le (1963) | Number |
|---|---|---|---|---|
| high | 55 [˥] | ◌ᥴ | ◌́ | 7 |
| low falling | 31 [˧˩] | ◌ᥳ | ◌̇ | 8 |
| rising | 35 [˧˥] | ◌ᥱ | ◌̌ | 9 |
| mid | 33 [˧] | ◌ | ◌ | 10 |

=== Comparison ===
Unchecked syllable comparison
| Tai Le | Mangshi (芒市) | Menglian (孟连) | English |
|---|---|---|---|
| ᥜᥣᥳ | fa^{4} | pʰa^{4} | sky |
| ᥘᥣᥝ | laːu^{6} | lau^{6} | star |
| ᥢᥛᥳ | lam^{4} | nɑm^{4} | water |
| ᥑᥭᥱ | xai^{5} | xɑi^{5} | egg |
| ᥢᥣᥰ | la^{2} | na^{2} | field |
| ᥜᥨᥢᥴ | fon^{1} | pʰon^{1} | rain |
| ᥛᥨᥭᥴ | moi^{1} | məi^{1} | frost |
| ᥙᥣᥲ ᥖᥬᥲ | pa^{3} taɯ^{3} | pɑ^{3} tɑ^{3} | under |

==== Checked syllable ====
Due to the irregular checked tones correspondence, the Tai Le used will be written in Mangshi dialect.

Checked syllable comparison
| Tai Le | Mangshi (芒市) | Menglian (孟连) | English |
|---|---|---|---|
| ᥖᥙᥴ | tap^{7} | tɑp^{7} | liver |
| ᥘᥨᥐ | lok^{8} | lok^{8} | bird |
| ᥞᥐ | hak^{8} | hɑk^{8} | love |
| ᥛᥩᥐᥱ | mɔk^{9} | mɔk^{9} | flower |
| ᥔᥨᥙᥱ | sop^{9} | sop^{9} | mouth |
| ᥚᥐᥴ | pʰak^{7} | pʰɑk^{10} | vegetable |
| ᥒᥫᥐ | ŋək^{8} | ŋək^{10} | dragon |
| ᥓᥫᥐ | tsək^{8} | tsək^{10} | rope |
| ᥓᥥᥙᥱ | tsep^{9} | tsep^{10} | pain |
| ᥚᥥᥖᥱ | pʰet^{9} | pʰet^{10} | spicy |
| ᥙᥥᥖᥱ | pet^{9} | pet^{10} | duck |
| ᥘᥧᥐᥴ | luk^{7} | luk^{9} | bone |
| ᥞᥧᥖᥴ | hut^{7} | hut^{9} | inhale |
| ᥐᥣᥙ | kaːp^{8} | kap^{9} | bite |

== Writing system ==
The Tai Le script is part of the Mon-Burmese family of writing systems and is closely related to the Ahom script. The script is thought to date back to the 14th century.

The original Tai Nuea spelling did not generally mark tones and failed to distinguish several vowels. It was reformed to make these distinctions, and diacritics were introduced to mark tones. The resulting writing system was officially introduced in 1956. In 1988, the spelling of tones was reformed; special tone letters were introduced instead of the earlier Latin diacritics.

The modern script has a total of 35 letters, including the five tone letters.

The transcription below is given according to the Unicode tables.

=== Consonants ===
| ᥐ k IPA: [k] | ᥑ x IPA: [x] | ᥒ ng IPA: [ŋ] |
| ᥓ ts IPA: [ts] | ᥔ s IPA: [s] | ᥕ y IPA: [j] |
| ᥖ t IPA: [t] | ᥗ th IPA: [tʰ] | ᥘ l IPA: [l] |
| ᥙ p IPA: [p] | ᥚ ph IPA: [pʰ] | ᥛ m IPA: [m] |
| ᥜ f IPA: [f] | ᥝ v IPA: [w] | |
| ᥞ h IPA: [h] | ᥟ q IPA: [ʔ] | |
| ᥠ kh IPA: [kʰ] | ᥡ tsh IPA: [tsʰ] | ᥢ n IPA: [n] |

=== Vowels and diphthongs ===
Consonants that are not followed by a vowel letter are pronounced with the inherent vowel [a]. Other vowels are indicated with the following letters:

| ᥣ a IPA: [aː] | ᥦ eh IPA: [ɛ] | ᥥ ee IPA: [e] | ᥤ i IPA: [i] | ᥧ u IPA: [u] | ᥨ oo IPA: [o] | ᥩ o IPA: [ɔ] | ᥪ ue IPA: [ɯ] | ᥫ e IPA: [ə] | ᥬ aue IPA: [aɯ] | ᥭ ai IPA: [ai] |

Diphthongs are formed by combining some vowel letters with the consonant ᥝ [w] and some vowel letters with ᥭ [ai]/[j].

=== Tones ===
In the Thai and Tai Lü writing systems, the tone value in the pronunciation of a written syllable depends on the tone class of the initial consonant, vowel length and syllable structure. In contrast, the Tai Nuea writing system has a very straightforward spelling of tones, with one letter (or diacritic) for each tone.

Tone marks were presented via the third reform (1963) as diacritics. Then the fourth reform (1988) changed them into tone letters. The tone letter is placed at the end of syllable. Examples in the table show the syllable [ta] in different tones.

the six tones of Tai Nuea
| Number | New (1988) | Old (1963) | Pitch |
|---|---|---|---|
| 1. | ᥖᥴ | ᥖ́ | mid rise ˨˦ |
| 2. | ᥖᥰ | ᥖ̈ | high fall ˥˧ |
| 3. | ᥖᥱ | ᥖ̌ | low ˩ |
| 4. | ᥖᥲ | ᥖ̀ | low fall ˧˩ |
| 5. | ᥖᥳ | ᥖ̇ | mid fall ˦˧ |
| 6. | ᥖ | ᥖ | mid ˧ |

Only three tones occur in checked syllables [syllables with a final -p, -t or -k]. The sixth tone (mid level) is not written in open syllables, and the third is not written in checked syllables.

== Grammar ==
=== Pronouns ===
Personal Pronouns
| | | Singular | | | Dual | Plural | |
| | | Mangshi | Menglian | Menglian (formal) | Mangshi | Mangshi | Menglian |
|---|---|---|---|---|---|---|---|
| 1st person | exclusive | ᥐᥝ (kau^{6}) | ᥐᥬ (kɑ^{6}) | ᥖᥧ ᥑᥬᥲ (tu^{6} xɑ^{3}) | ᥞᥣᥒᥰ ᥞᥫᥴ (haːŋ^{2} xə^{1}) | ᥖᥧ (tu^{6}) | ᥖᥧ (tu^{6}) |
| 1st person | inclusive | ᥐᥝ (kau^{6}) | ᥐᥬ (kɑ^{6}) | ᥖᥧ ᥑᥬᥲ (tu^{6} xɑ^{3}) | ᥞᥣᥒᥰ ᥞᥣᥰ (haːŋ^{2} ha^{2}) | ᥞᥝᥰ (hau^{2}) | ᥞᥝᥰ (hɑu^{2}) |
| 2nd person | | ᥛᥬᥰ (maɯ^{2}) | ᥛᥬᥰ (mɑ^{2}) | ᥔᥧᥴ ᥓᥝᥲ (su^{1} tsɑu^{3}) | ᥔᥩᥒᥴ ᥞᥫᥴ (sɔŋ^{1} xə^{1}) | ᥔᥧᥴ (su^{1}) | ᥔᥧᥴ (su^{1}) |
| 3rd person | | ᥛᥢᥰ (man^{2}) | ᥛᥢᥰ (mɑn^{2}) | | ᥔᥩᥒᥴ ᥞᥣᥴ (sɔŋ^{1} xa^{1}) | ᥑᥝᥴ (xau^{1}) | ᥑᥬᥴ (xɑ^{1}) |

Other Pronouns
| | Mangshi | Menglian |
|---|---|---|
| Reflexive | ᥙᥪᥴ ᥓᥝᥲ (pɯ^{1} tsau^{3}) | ᥐᥩᥭᥰ ᥘᥥᥝ (kɔi^{2} leu^{6}) |
| Interrogative | ᥚᥬᥴ (pʰaɯ^{1}) | ᥙᥧᥱ ᥘᥬ (pu^{5} lɑ^{6}) |
| Everyone | ᥙᥫᥝ (pən^{6}) | ᥙᥫᥝ (pən^{6}) |
| Other people | ᥖᥒᥰ ᥘᥣᥭᥴ (taŋ^{2} laːi^{1}) | ᥖᥒᥰ ᥘᥣᥭᥴ (tɑŋ^{2} lai^{1}) |

=== Syntax ===
Tai Nuea word order is usually subject–verb–object (SVO); modifiers (e.g. adjectives) follow nouns.

=== Demonstrative ===
| | Mangshi | Menglian |
|---|---|---|
| This | ᥘᥭᥳ (lai^{4}) | ᥢᥭᥳ (nɑi^{4}) |
| That | ᥘᥢᥳ (lan^{4}) | ᥢᥢᥳ (nɑn^{4}) |
| Here | ᥖᥤ ᥘᥭᥳ (ti^{6} lai^{4}) | ᥖᥤ ᥢᥭᥳ (ti^{6} nɑi^{4}) |
| There | ᥖᥤ ᥘᥢᥳ (ti^{6} lan^{4}) | ᥖᥤ ᥢᥢᥳ (ti^{6} nɑn^{4}) |

=== Adverb ===
Interrogative
| | Mangshi | Menglian |
|---|---|---|
| What | ᥔᥒᥴ (saŋ^{1}) | ᥖᥤ ᥔᥒᥴ (ti^{6} sɑŋ^{1}) |
| Why | ᥐᥩᥙ ᥖᥤ ᥔᥒᥴ (kɔp^{6} ti^{6} saŋ^{1}) | |
| Who | ᥚᥬᥴ (pʰaɯ^{1}) | ᥙᥧᥱ ᥘᥬ (pu^{5} lɑ^{6}) |
| Where | (ᥖᥤ) ᥗᥬᥴ (ti^{6} thaɯ^{1}) | ᥖᥤᥴ ᥘᥬ (ti^{1} lɑ^{6}) |
| Which | ᥘᥬ (laɯ^{6}) | ᥘᥬ (lɑ^{6}) |
| How much | ᥑᥬ (xaɯ^{6}) | ᥑᥬ ᥘᥬ (xɑ^{6} lɑ^{6}) |
| How many | ᥐᥤᥱ (ki^{5}) | ᥐᥤᥱ (ki^{5}) |

=== Numeral ===
Numerals
| | Mangshi | Menglian |
|---|---|---|
| 0 | ᥘᥤᥢᥳ (lin^{4}) | ᥘᥤᥢᥳ (lin^{4}) |
| 1 | ᥘᥫᥒ (ləŋ^{6}) | ᥢᥫᥒ (nəŋ^{6}) |
| 1 | ᥟᥥᥖᥱ (et^{9}) | ᥟᥥᥖ (et^{10}) |
| 2 | ᥔᥩᥒᥴ (sɔŋ^{1}) | ᥔᥩᥒᥴ (sɔŋ^{1}) |
| 3 | ᥔᥣᥛᥴ (saːm^{1}) | ᥔᥣᥛᥴ (sam^{1}) |
| 4 | ᥔᥤᥱ (si^{5}) | ᥔᥤᥱ (si^{5}) |
| 5 | ᥞᥣᥲ (ha^{3}) | ᥞᥣᥲ (ha^{3}) |
| 6 | ᥞᥨᥐᥱ (hok^{9}) | ᥞᥨᥐ (hok^{10}) |
| 7 | ᥓᥥᥖᥱ (tset^{9}) | ᥓᥥᥖ (tset^{10}) |
| 8 | ᥙᥦᥖᥱ (pɛt^{9}) | ᥙᥦᥖᥱ (pɛt^{9}) |
| 9 | ᥐᥝᥲ (kau^{3}) | ᥐᥝᥲ (kɑu^{3}) |
| 10 | ᥔᥤᥙᥴ (sip^{7}) | ᥔᥤᥙ (sip^{10}) |
| 11 | ᥔᥤᥙᥴ ᥟᥥᥖᥱ (sip^{7} et^{9}) | ᥔᥤᥙ ᥟᥥᥖ (sip^{10} et^{10}) |
| 20 | ᥔᥣᥝᥰ ᥘᥫᥒ (saːu^{2} ləŋ^{6}) | ᥔᥣᥝᥰ ᥢᥫᥒ (sau^{2} nəŋ^{6}) |
| 21 | ᥔᥣᥝᥰ ᥟᥥᥖᥱ (saːu^{2} et^{9}) | ᥔᥣᥝᥰ ᥟᥥᥖ (sau^{2} et^{10}) |
| 25 | ᥔᥣᥝᥰ ᥞᥣᥲ (saːu^{2} ha^{3}) | ᥔᥣᥝᥰ ᥞᥣᥲ (sau^{2} ha^{3}) |
| 30 | ᥔᥤᥙᥴ ᥔᥣᥛᥴ (saːm^{1} sip^{7}) | ᥔᥤᥙ ᥔᥣᥛᥴ (sam^{1} sip^{10}) |
| 100 | ᥙᥣᥐᥱ (paːk^{9}) | ᥙᥣᥐᥱ (pak^{9}) |
| 205 | ᥔᥩᥒᥴ ᥙᥣᥐᥱ ᥙᥣᥭ ᥞᥣᥲ (sɔŋ^{1} paːk^{9} pai^{6} ha^{3}) | ᥔᥩᥒᥴ ᥙᥣᥐᥱ ᥙᥣᥭ ᥞᥣᥲ (sɔŋ^{1} pak^{9} pai^{6} ha^{3}) |
| 1000 | ᥞᥥᥒᥴ (heŋ^{1}) | ᥞᥥᥒᥴ (heŋ^{1}) |
| 10000 | ᥛᥧᥢᥱ (mun^{5}) | ᥛᥧᥢᥱ (mun^{5}) |
| 70006 | ᥓᥥᥖᥱ ᥛᥧᥢᥱ ᥙᥣᥭ ᥞᥨᥐᥱ (tset^{9} mun^{5} paːi^{6} hok^{9}) | ᥓᥥᥖ ᥛᥧᥢᥱ ᥙᥣᥭ ᥞᥨᥐ (tset^{10} mun^{5} paːi^{6} hok^{10}) |
| 1st | ᥐᥨᥳ ᥞᥨᥴ (ko^{4} ho^{1}) | ᥗᥨᥢᥲ ᥢᥫᥒ (tʰon^{3} nəŋ^{6}) |
| 2nd | ᥐᥨᥳ ᥖᥛᥰ (ko^{4} tam^{2}) | ᥗᥨᥢᥲ ᥔᥨᥒᥴ (tʰon^{3} soŋ^{1}) |
| 3rd | ᥐᥨᥳ ᥔᥣᥛᥴ (ko^{4} saːm^{1}) | ᥗᥨᥢᥲ ᥔᥣᥛᥴ (tʰon^{3} sam^{1}) |
| last | ᥐᥨᥳ ᥔᥧᥖᥴ (ko^{4} sut^{7}) | ᥗᥨᥢᥲ ᥔᥧᥖ (tʰon^{3} sut^{10}) |

== Text sample ==
ᥛᥬᥰ ᥐᥤᥢ ᥑᥝᥲ ᥕᥝᥳ ᥞᥪᥴ?
maɯ^{2} kin^{6} xau^{3} jau^{4} hi^{1}
you eat rice PERF.PTC INTERR.PTC
Have you eaten? (a common greeting)

ᥐᥝ ᥛᥨᥝᥴ ᥖᥣᥢᥲ ᥑᥣᥛᥰ ᥖᥭᥰ ᥖᥬᥲ ᥑᥨᥒᥰ
kau^{6} mo^{1} taan^{3} xaam^{2} tai^{2} taɯ^{3} xong^{2}
I can speak language Tai De hong
I can speak Dehong Tai/ Tai Nuea.

== Language use ==
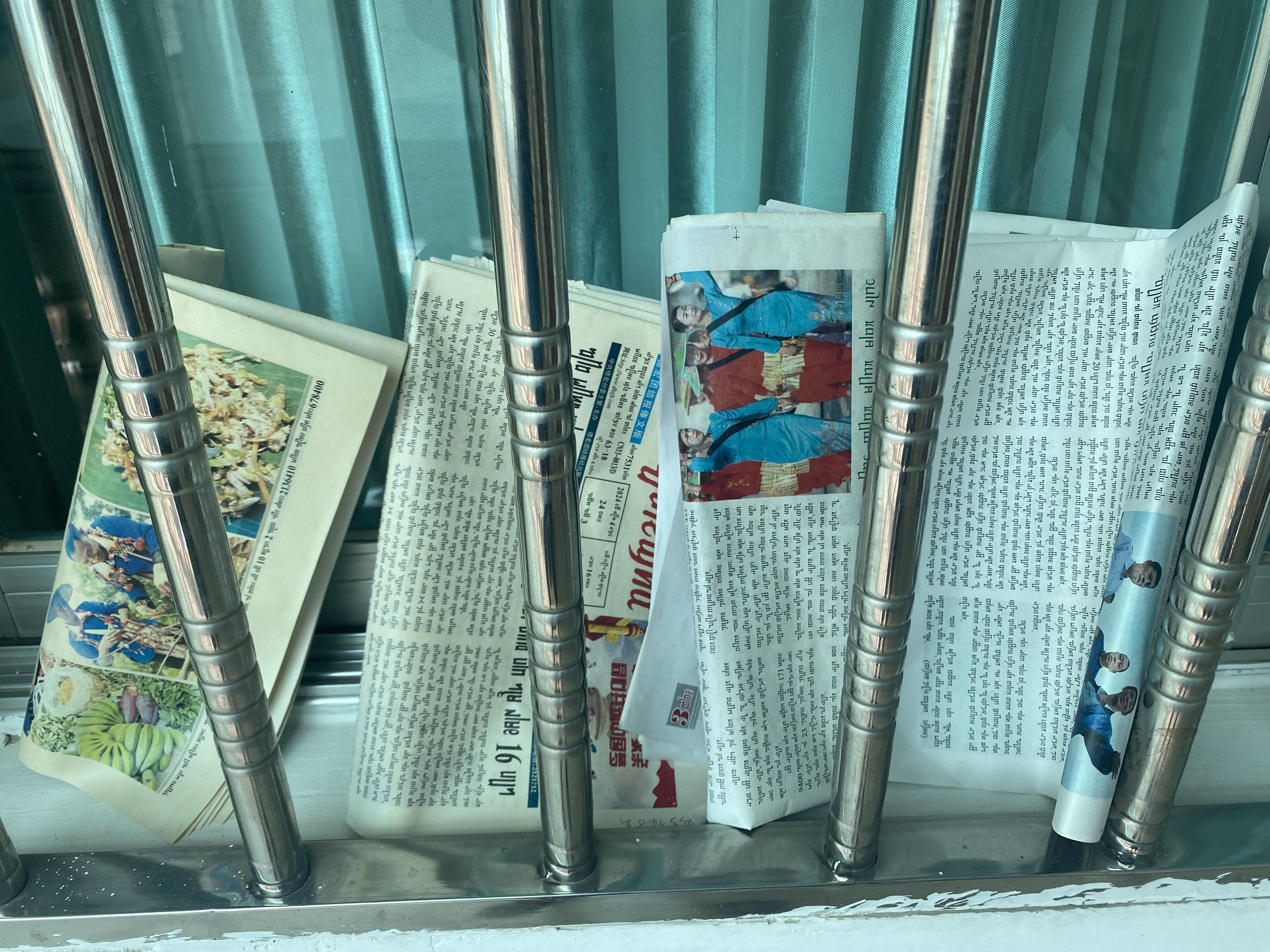
A Tai Nuea edition of the newspaper 德宏团结报

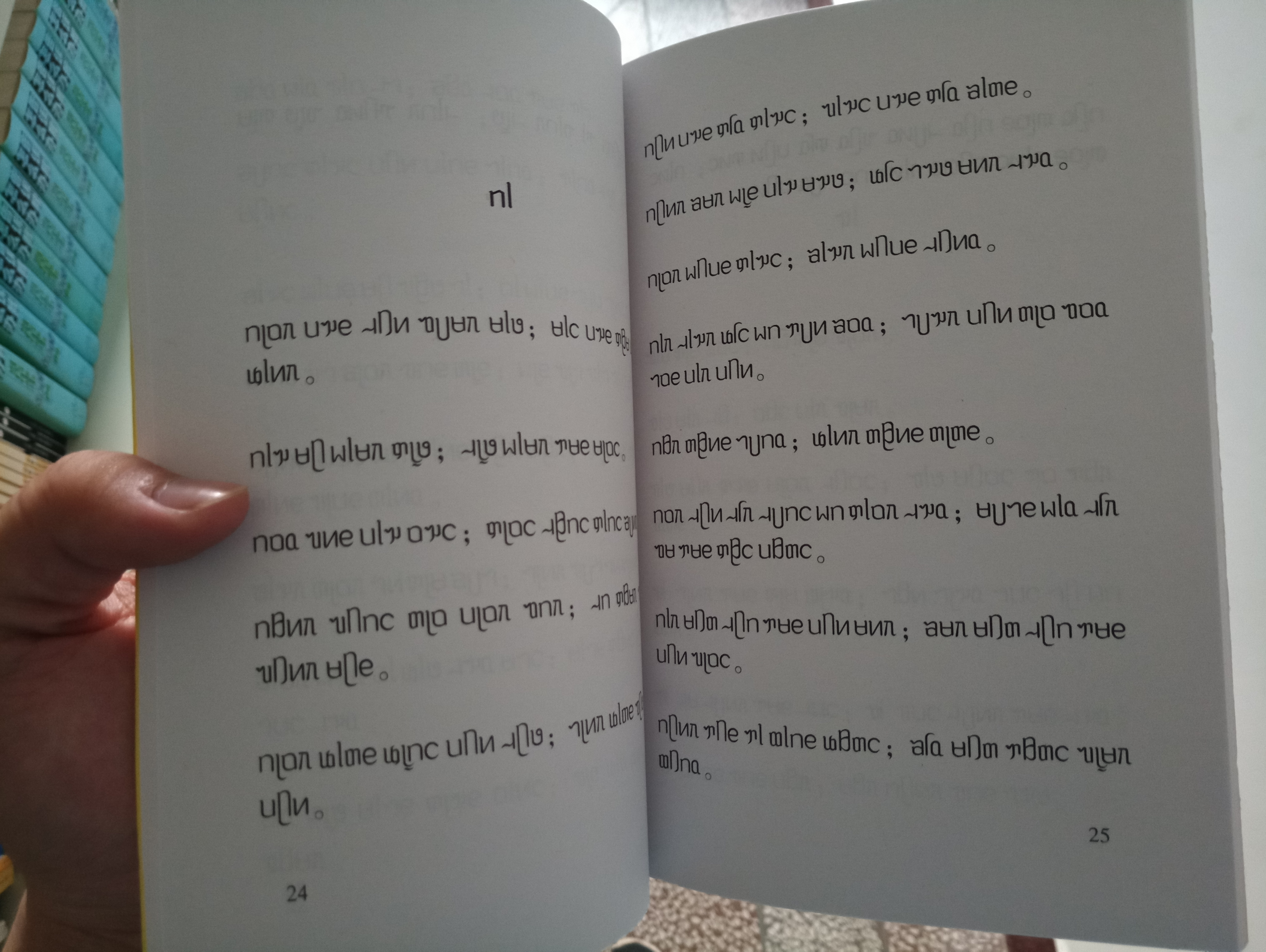
A textbook printed in the Tai Nuea Language

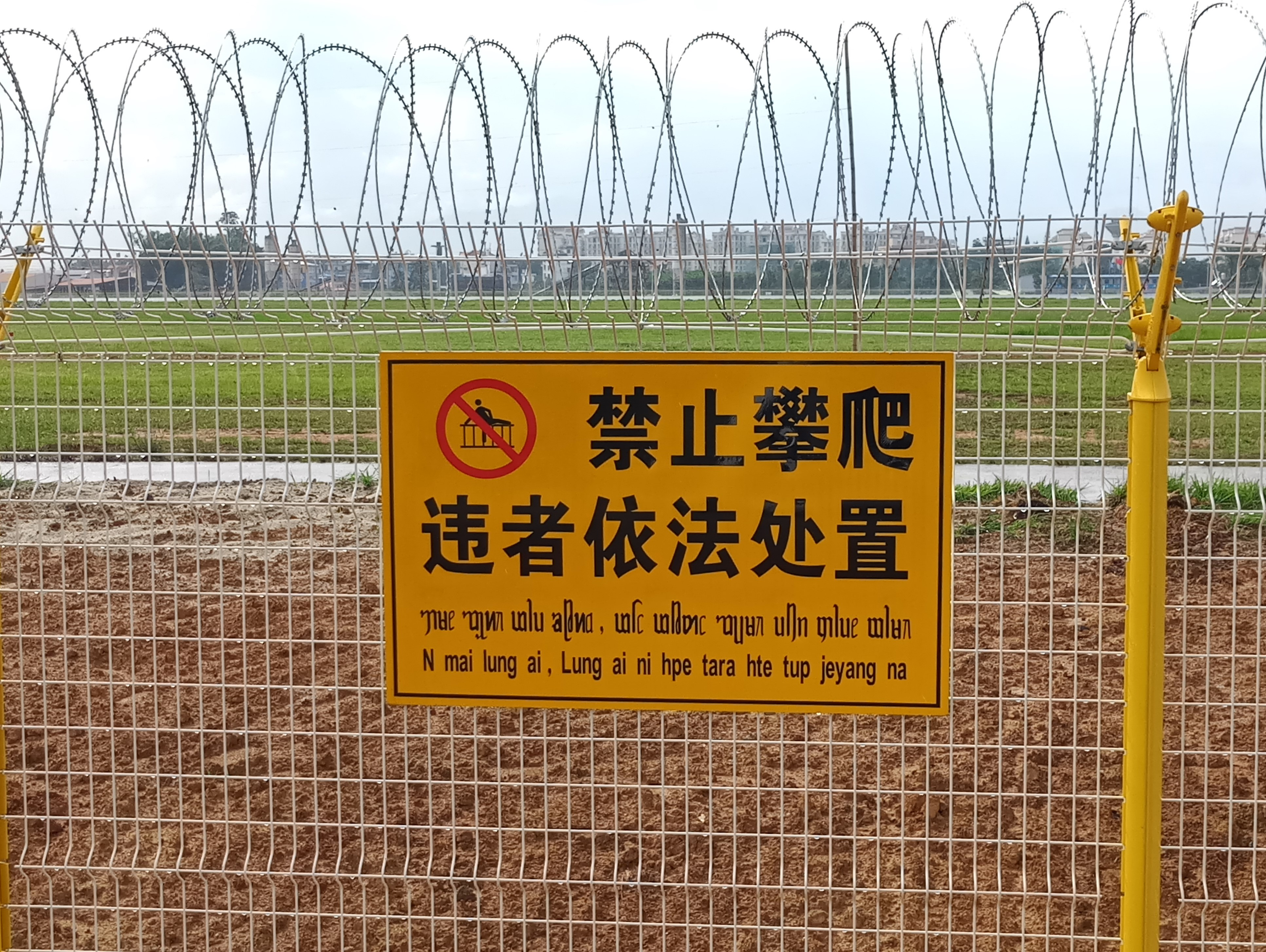
A public sign in the Tai Nuea and Jingpo language

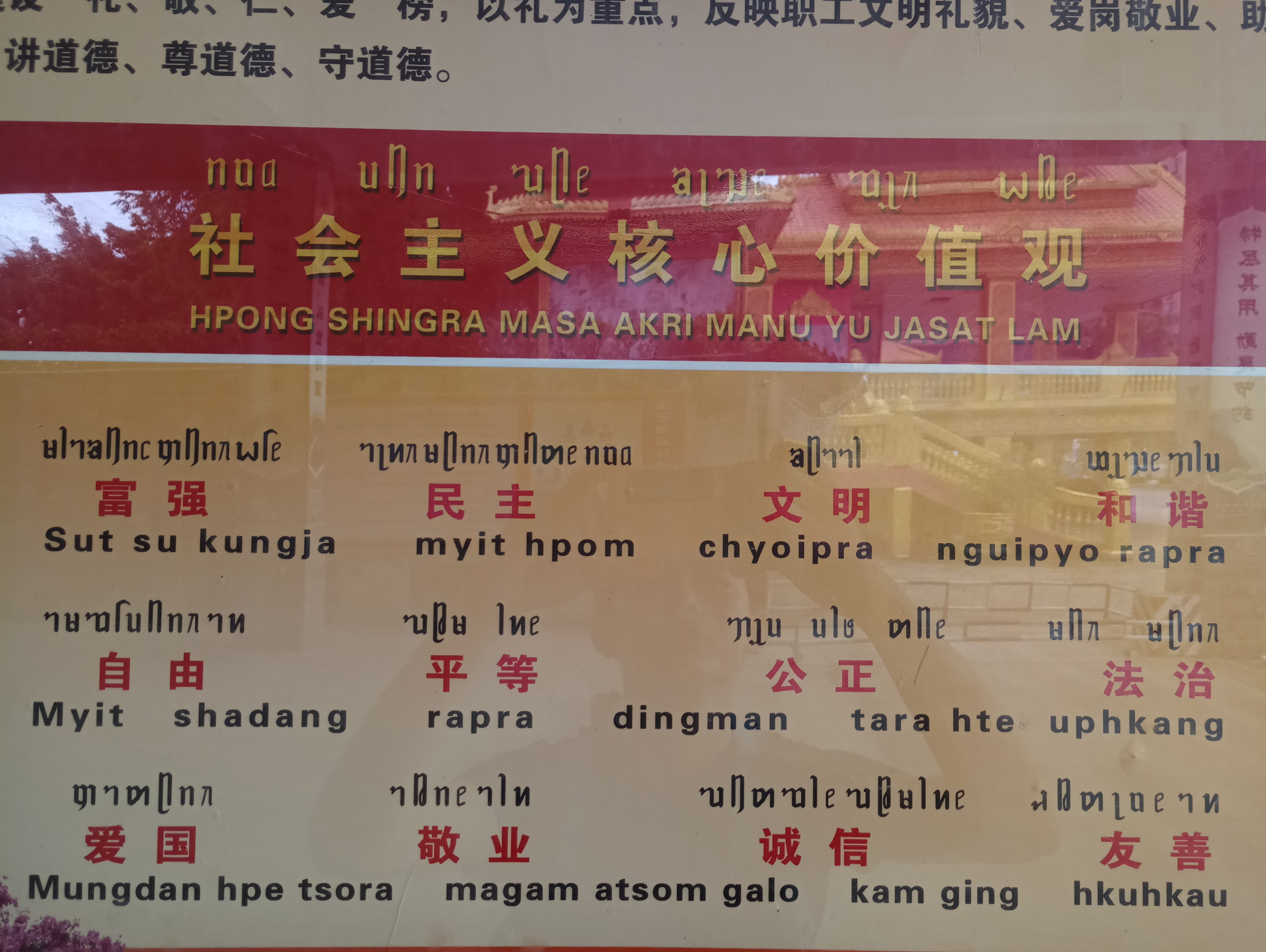
A board written in Chinese, Tai Nuea, and Jingpo language

Tai Nuea has official status in some parts of Yunnan (China), where it is used on signs and in education. Yunnan People's Radio Station (Yúnnán rénmín guǎngbō diàntái 云南人民广播电台) broadcasts in Tai Nuea. On the other hand, however, very little printed material is published in Tai Nuea in China. However, many signs of roads and stores in Mangshi are in Tai Nuea.

In Thailand, a collection of 108 proverbs was published with translations into Thai and English.

== Bibliography ==
- Chantanaroj, Apiradee (2007). A Preliminary Sociolinguistic Survey of Selected Tai Nua Speech Varieties (PDF) (Master's thesis). Payap University. Archived from the original (PDF) on 2020-05-02.
- Luo, Yongxian (1998). A Dictionary of Dehong, Southwest China. Canberra: Pacific Linguistics. doi:10.15144/PL-C145. hdl:1885/146619. ISBN 9780858834965.
- Teekhachunhatean, Roong-a-roon รุ่งอรุณ ทีฆชุณหเถียร (2000). "Reflections on Tai Dehong Society from Language Point of View". Phaasaa Lae Phaasaasart / Journal of Language and Linguistics. 18 (2): 71–82.
- Zhou, Yaowen 周耀文; Fang, Bolong 方伯龙; Meng, Zunxian 孟尊贤 (1981). "Déhóng Dǎiwén" 德宏傣文 [Dehong Dai]. Mínzú yǔwén 民族语文 (in Chinese). 1981 (3).
- Zhou, Yaowen 周耀文; Luo, Meizhen 罗美珍 (2001). Dǎiyǔ fāngyán yánjiū: Yǔyīn, cíhuì, wénzì 傣语方言硏究 : 语音, 词汇, 文字 (in Chinese). Beijing: Minzu chubanshe.
- Zhang, Gongjin 张公瑾 (1981). "Dǎiwén jí qí wénxiàn" 傣文及其文献 [The Dai language and Dai Documents]. Zhōngguóshǐ yánjiū dòngtài 中国史研究动态 (in Chinese). 1981 (6).
- Berlie, Jean A. (1993). Neua (Na) in Yunnan (PRC) and the LPDR: A Minority and a "Non-Minority" in the Chinese and Lao Political Systems. London: School of Oriental and African Studies, University of London.
