= Donghe Township, Lancang County =

Donghe Township 东河乡
- Township
- Etymology: 东河, Dōnghé ("east river")
- Location in Yunnan.
- Coordinates: 22°55′29″N 100°04′21″E
- Country: People's Republic of China
- Province: Yunnan
- Prefecture-level city: Pu'er City
- Autonomous county: Lancang Lahu Autonomous County
- Incorporated (township): 1988

Area
  - Total: 256 km^{2} (99 sq mi)

Population (2017)
  - Total: 11,115
  - Density: 43.4/km^{2} (112/sq mi)
- Time zone: UTC+08:00 (China Standard)
- Postal code: 665628
- Area code: 0879

Donghe Township (simplified Chinese: 东河乡; traditional Chinese: 東河鄉; pinyin: Dōnghé Xiāng) is a township in Lancang Lahu Autonomous County, Yunnan, China. As of the 2017 census it had a population of 11,115 and an area of 256-square-kilometre (99 sq mi).

== Etymology ==
The name of "Donghe" named is after the "Dong River" (东河; 'East River'), which flows through the region.

== Administrative division ==
As of 2016, the township is divided into seven villages:

- Banggna (邦敢村)
- Hebian (河边村)
- Dalaba (大拉巴村)
- Nandai (南岱村)
- Donghe (东河村)
- Zhabu (扎布村)
- Xiaotang (硝塘村)

== History ==
In the Republic of China (1912-1949), it belonged to Daling Township (大岭乡).

After establishment of the Communist State, it was merged into Dashan District (大山区). It was demerged from Donghe District (东河区) in 1984. It was incorporated officially as a township in 1988.

== Geography ==
It lies at the northern of Lancang Lahu Autonomous County, bordering Nanling Township to the southwest, Fubang Township to the west, ianliu Yi Ethnic Township to the south and east, Shangyun to the northwest, and Dashan Township to the northeast.

The Dong River (东河; 'East River') and Laba River (拉巴河) flow through the township.

== Economy ==
The principal industries in the area are agriculture. Significant crops include grain, corn, wheat, tea, and fruit.

== Demographics ==
Population census
Year	Pop.	±%
2004	14,341	—
2017	11,115	−22.5%

As of 2017, the National Bureau of Statistics of China estimates the township's population now to be 11,115.

Ethnic groups in 2004
Ethnicity	Population	Percentage
Lahu	6851	47.8%
Han	3845	26.8%
Wa	1405	9.8%
Yi	1072	7.5%
Hui	495	2.8%
Hani	390	2.7%
Dai	628	4.4%
Blang	86	0.6%
Other	64	0.4%
