= Menglang =

Menglang Town 勐朗镇 ᥛᥫᥒᥰ ᥘᥣᥛᥰ
- Town
- Etymology: 勐朗, Mènglǎng ("a washed place")
- Location in Yunnan.
- Coordinates: 22°33′31″N 99°56′01″E
- Country: People's Republic of China
- Province: Yunnan
- Prefecture-level city: Pu'er City
- Autonomous county: Lancang Lahu Autonomous County
- Designated (town): 1962

Area
  - Total: 710 km^{2} (270 sq mi)
- Elevation: 1,054 m (3,458 ft)

Population (2017)
  - Total: 87,703
  - Density: 120/km^{2} (320/sq mi)
- Time zone: UTC+08:00 (China Standard)
- Postal code: 665699
- Area code: 0879

Menglang (simplified Chinese: 勐朗镇; traditional Chinese: 勐朗鎮; pinyin: Mènglǎng Zhèn; Tai Nüa: ᥛᥫᥒᥰ ᥘᥣᥛᥰ) is a town in and the county seat of Lancang Lahu Autonomous County, Yunnan, China. As of the 2017 census it had a population of 87,703 and an area of 710-square-kilometre (270 sq mi). Menglang is the administrative, cultural, economic and transportation center of the Lancang Lahu Autonomous County.

== Etymology ==
"Menglang" is a place name of Dai language. "Meng" means place and "Lang" means wash. Two words together, meaning a washed place.

== Administrative division ==
As of 2016, the town is divided into four communities and eleven villages:

- Fofang Community (佛房社区)
- Dashuijing Community (大水井社区)
- Wenquan Community (温泉社区)
- Qiankuang Community (铅矿社区)
- Tangsheng (唐胜村)
- Mengbin (勐滨村)
- Nandian (南甸村)
- Fuben (富本村)
- Dalinwo (大林窝村)
- Xiagudi (下谷地村)
- Luoba (罗八村)
- Dapingzhang (大平掌村)
- Kanmashan (看马山村)
- Baomaidi (包麦地村)
- Bulao (布老村)

== History ==
After the Management System Reform in the Ming dynasty (1368–1644), it came under the jurisdiction of Menglian Zhangguansi (孟连长官司).

In the Qing dynasty (1644–1911), it became the jurisdiction of Mengbin Tusi (勐滨土司).

In 1940, it belonged to the 1st District of Lancang County. That same year, the 1st District of Lancang County was revoked and it belonged to Donglang Township (东朗乡).

Menglang was upgraded to a town in August 1962. In 1988, Tangsheng Township (唐胜乡) was merged into the town. In January 2006, the villages of Mashan (马山村), Bulao (布老村) and Baomaidi (包麦地村) and Donglang Hani Ethnic Township (东郎哈尼族乡) were merged into Menglang.

== Geography ==
It is surrounded by Laba Township and Zhutang Township on the northwest, Nuozhadu Town on the southeast, Donghui Town on the southwest, and Nanling Township on the northeast.

The town is in the subtropical climate zone, with an average annual temperature of 18.9 °C (66.0 °F), total annual rainfall of 1,200-to-2,400-millimetre (47 to 94 in), a frost-free period of 240 to 280 days and annual average sunshine hours in 2118.9 hours.

The terrain of the town is high in the northeast and low in the southwest. The highest point in the town is Mount Mangjing (芒京山), which, at 2,090 metres (6,860 ft) above sea level.

The Nanlang River (南朗河) flows through the town.

== Economy ==
The local economy is primarily based upon agriculture and pig-breeding. Soybean, vegetable, and sugarcane are the economic plants of this region.

== Demographics ==
Population census
Year	Pop.	±%
2004	11,186	—
2017	87,703	+684.0%

As of 2017, the National Bureau of Statistics of China estimates the town's population now to be 87,703.

Ethnic groups in 2004
Ethnicity	Population	Percentage
Hani	1864	16.7%
Lahu	4039	36.1%
Han	3904	34.9%
Wa	128	1.1%
Yi	326	2.9%
Dai	289	2.6%
Hui	383	3.4%
Other	253	2.3%

== Transportation ==
The National Highway G214 passes across the town northwest to southeast.

The town is the starting point of Provincial Highway S309.
