= Shuangjiang Lahu, Va, Blang and Dai Autonomous County =

Shuangjiang County 双江县 · si nblāeng sin
- Autonomous county
- 双江拉祜族佤族布朗族傣族自治县; Shuangjiang Lahu, Va, Bulang and Dai; Autonomous County
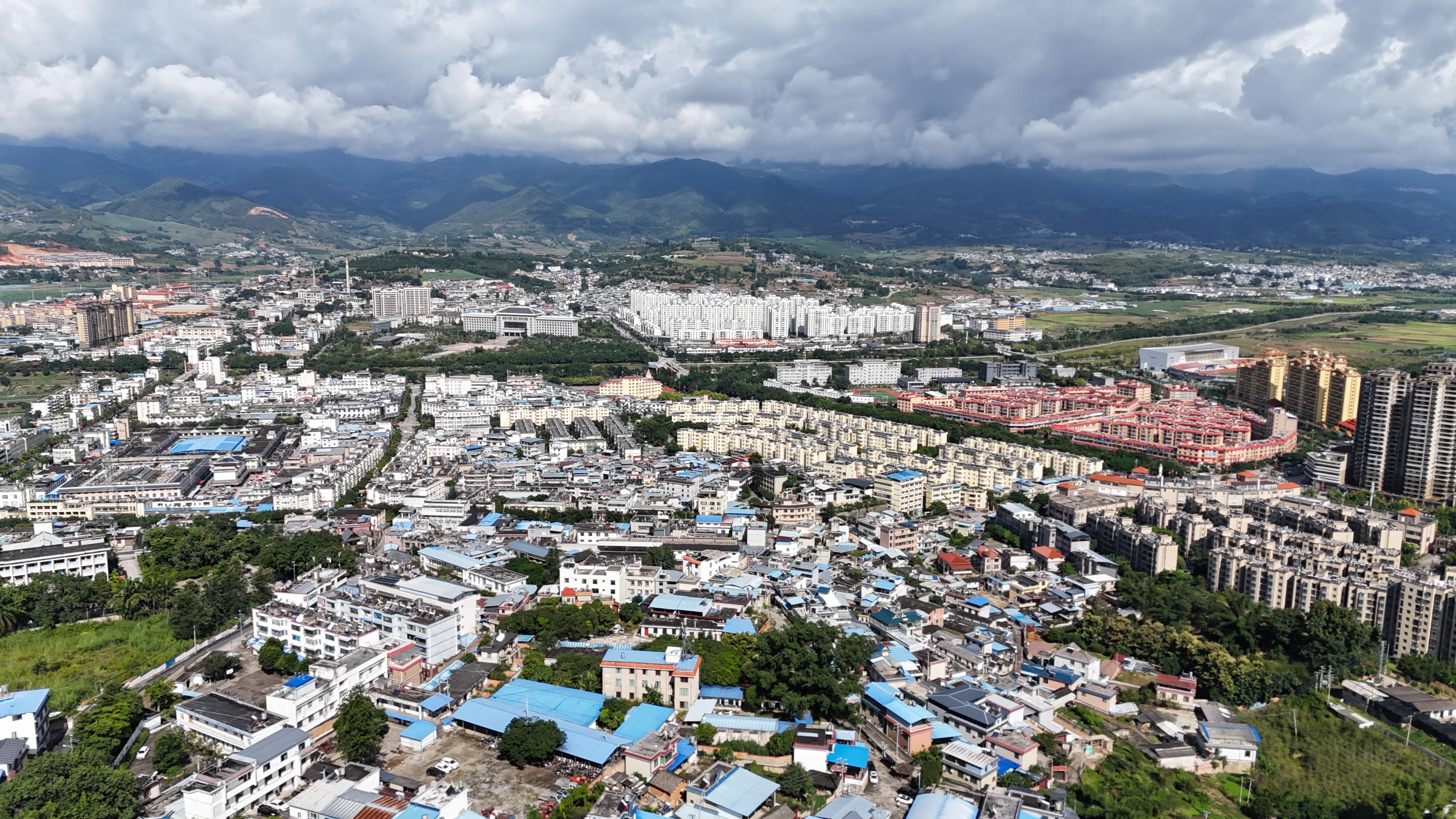
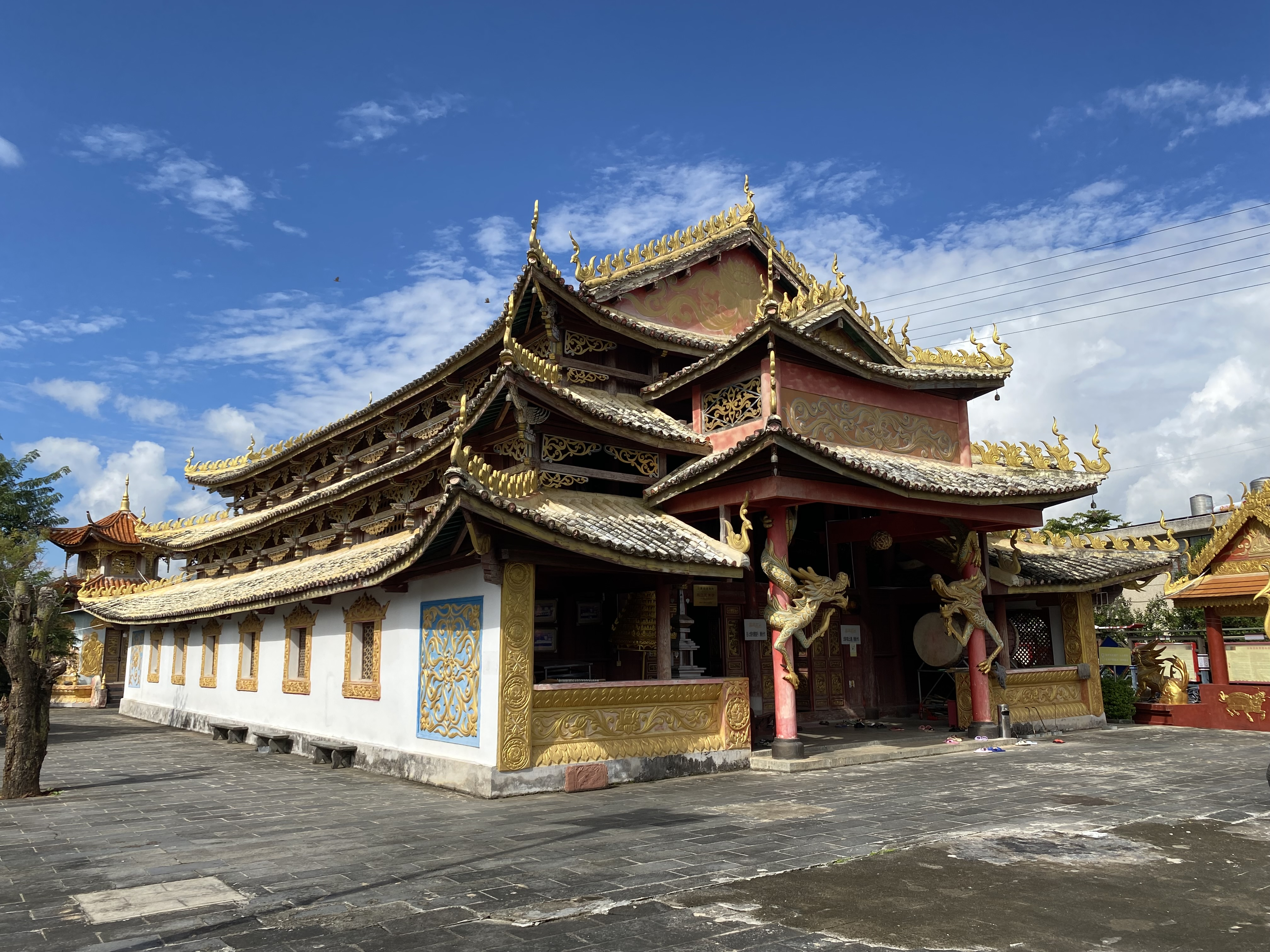
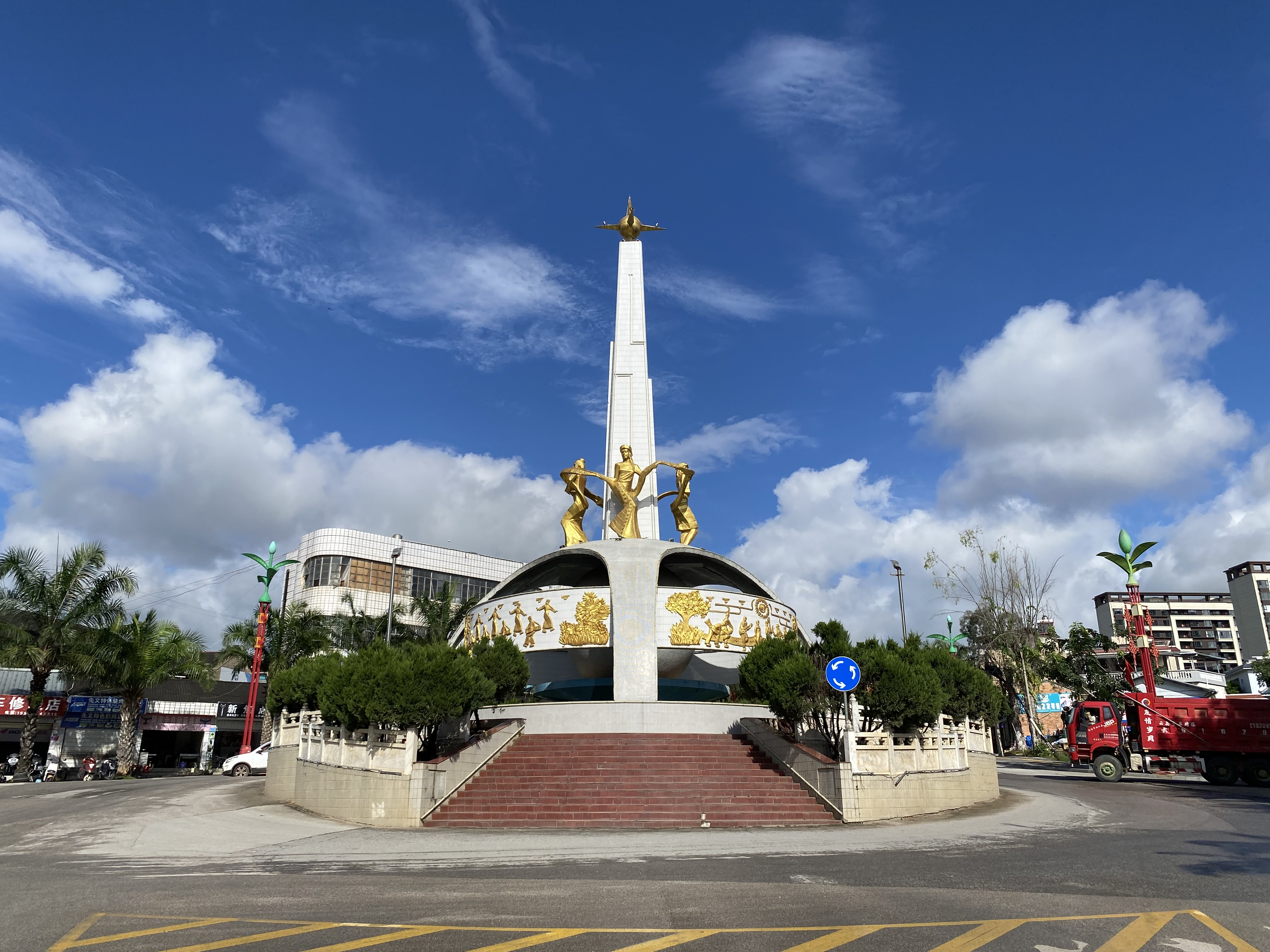
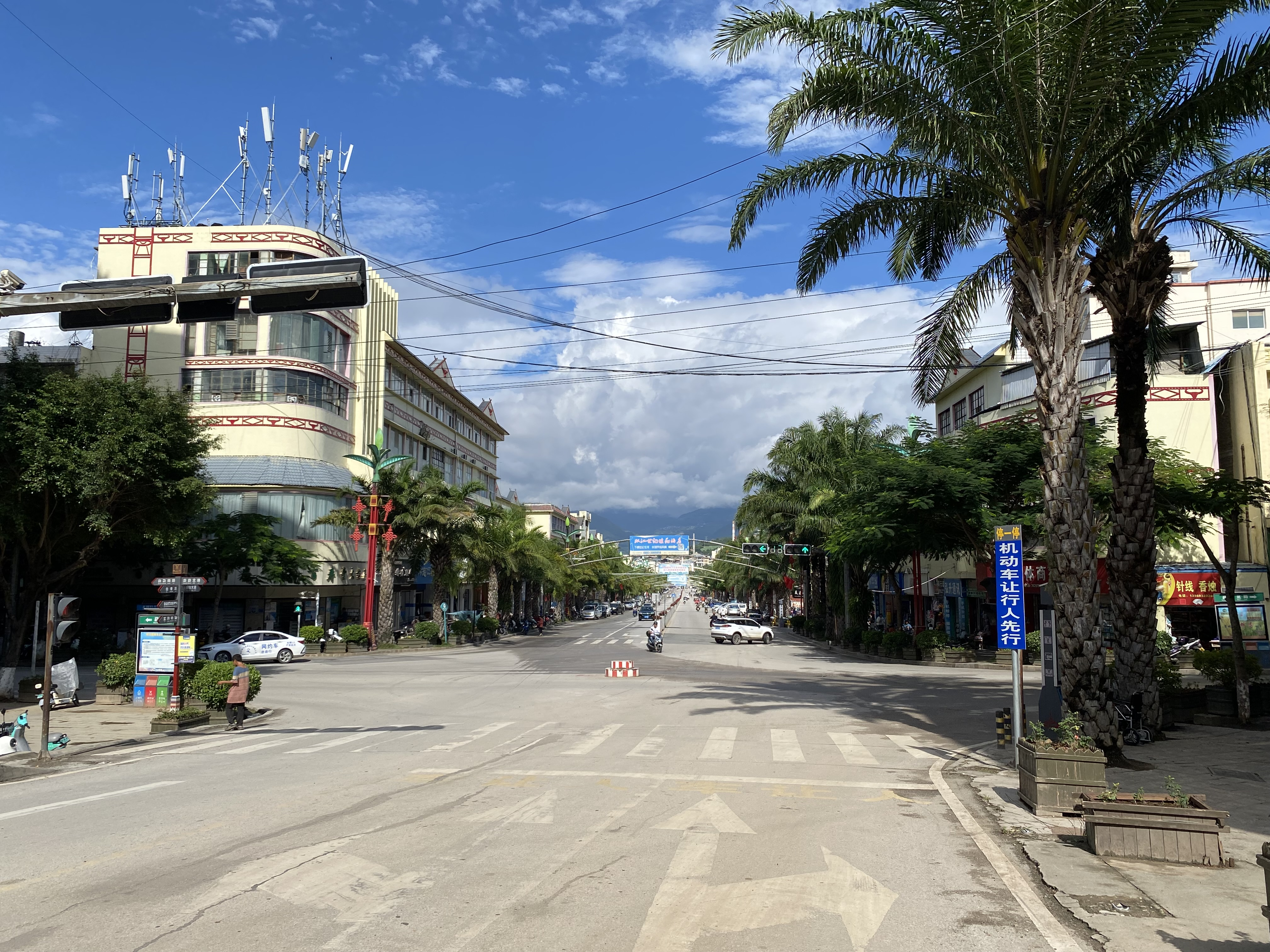
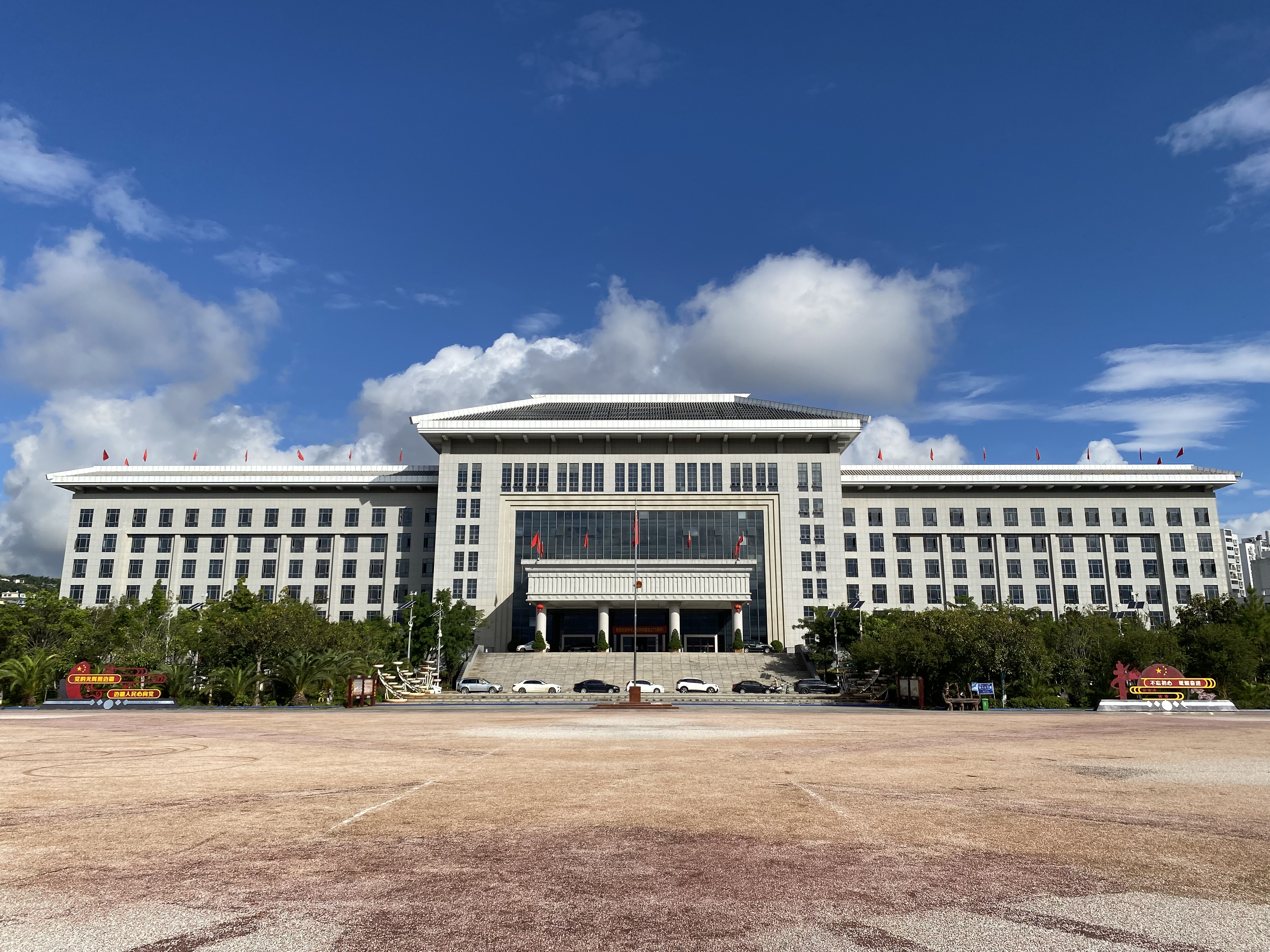
- Cityscape of county town Shuangjiang Central Temple County Landmark Sculpture Tropic of Cancer Avenue County hall

- Location of Shuangjiang County (red) and Lincang City (pink) within Yunnan

- Location within China
- Coordinates: 23°29′00″N 99°50′25″E
- Country: China
- Province: Yunnan
- Prefecture-level city: Lincang
- County seat: Mengmeng

Area
  - Total: 2,292 km^{2} (885 sq mi)

Population (2020 census)
  - Total: 164,756
  - Density: 71.88/km^{2} (186.2/sq mi)
- Time zone: UTC+8 (CST)
- Postal code: 677300
- Area code: 0883
- Website: www.shuangjiang.gov.cn

Shuangjiang Lahu, Va, Blang and Dai Autonomous County
- Simplified Chinese: 双江拉祜族佤族布朗族傣族自治县
- Traditional Chinese: 雙江拉祜族佤族布朗族傣族自治縣
Transcriptions
Standard Mandarin
- Hanyu Pinyin: Shuāngjiāng lāhùzú wǎzú bùlǎngzú dǎizú Zìzhìxiàn

Shuangjiang Lahu, Va, Blang and Dai Autonomous County (Chinese: 双江拉祜族佤族布朗族傣族自治县; pinyin: Shuāngjiāng Lāhùzú Wǎzú Bùlǎngzú Dǎizú Zìzhìxiàn; Awa: si nblāeng) is a county in the southwest of Yunnan province, China. It is under the administration of the prefecture-level city of Lincang.

== Administrative divisions ==
Shuangjiang Lahu, Va, Bulang and Dai Autonomous County has 2 towns and 4 townships.

2 towns

- Mengmeng (勐勐镇)
- Mengku (勐库镇)

4 townships

- Shahe (沙河乡)
- Dawen (大文乡)
- Mangnuo (忙糯乡)
- Bangbing (邦丙乡)

== Ethnic groups ==
Ethnic Wa (population: 11,613) are concentrated in the west and south of Shuangjiang County, especially in the following two villages (Shuangjiang County Gazetteer).

- Man'e 勐峨, Shahe Township 沙河乡
- Nanxie 南协, Bangbing Township 邦丙乡

== Transportation ==
- China National Highway 214

== Climate ==
Climate data for Shuangjiang, elevation 1,044 m (3,425 ft), (1991–2020 normals, extremes 1981–present)
Month	Jan	Feb	Mar	Apr	May	Jun	Jul	Aug	Sep	Oct	Nov	Dec	Year
Record high °C (°F)	29.9 (85.8)	31.8 (89.2)	33.6 (92.5)	35.4 (95.7)	36.8 (98.2)	37.0 (98.6)	34.4 (93.9)	35.1 (95.2)	33.3 (91.9)	33.3 (91.9)	32.4 (90.3)	28.4 (83.1)	37.0 (98.6)
Mean daily maximum °C (°F)	23.7 (74.7)	26.0 (78.8)	28.9 (84.0)	30.6 (87.1)	30.8 (87.4)	30.3 (86.5)	29.0 (84.2)	29.5 (85.1)	29.4 (84.9)	27.9 (82.2)	25.7 (78.3)	23.4 (74.1)	27.9 (82.3)
Daily mean °C (°F)	13.3 (55.9)	15.7 (60.3)	19.2 (66.6)	21.8 (71.2)	23.7 (74.7)	24.7 (76.5)	24.1 (75.4)	24.0 (75.2)	23.2 (73.8)	21.1 (70.0)	17.1 (62.8)	13.8 (56.8)	20.1 (68.3)
Mean daily minimum °C (°F)	6.1 (43.0)	7.5 (45.5)	11.2 (52.2)	14.9 (58.8)	18.4 (65.1)	21.1 (70.0)	21.2 (70.2)	20.9 (69.6)	19.8 (67.6)	17.3 (63.1)	12.0 (53.6)	7.9 (46.2)	14.9 (58.7)
Record low °C (°F)	0.9 (33.6)	1.8 (35.2)	3.5 (38.3)	8.9 (48.0)	12.4 (54.3)	15.6 (60.1)	15.9 (60.6)	16.3 (61.3)	11.5 (52.7)	8.4 (47.1)	5.0 (41.0)	−0.8 (30.6)	−0.8 (30.6)
Average precipitation mm (inches)	26.5 (1.04)	13.4 (0.53)	19.0 (0.75)	48.6 (1.91)	90.2 (3.55)	125.9 (4.96)	199.9 (7.87)	167.1 (6.58)	130.7 (5.15)	97.3 (3.83)	35.1 (1.38)	13.4 (0.53)	967.1 (38.08)
Average precipitation days (≥ 0.1 mm)	3.2	3.2	4.5	9.7	13.9	19.2	23.6	21.8	17.5	13.4	5.8	3.2	139
Average relative humidity (%)	71	62	58	62	68	76	82	82	82	81	79	77	73
Mean monthly sunshine hours	240.6	242.0	248.5	228.8	213.8	147.7	117.7	148.7	161.2	176.2	198.2	212.1	2,335.5
Percentage possible sunshine	71	75	66	60	52	36	28	37	44	50	61	64	54
Source: China Meteorological Administrationall-time October highall-time November high
