= Ximeng Va Autonomous County =

Ximeng County 西盟县 · Si Mēng Sin
- Autonomous county
- 西盟佤族自治县; Si Mēng Vax Qux Zi Zi Sin; Ximeng Va Autonomous County
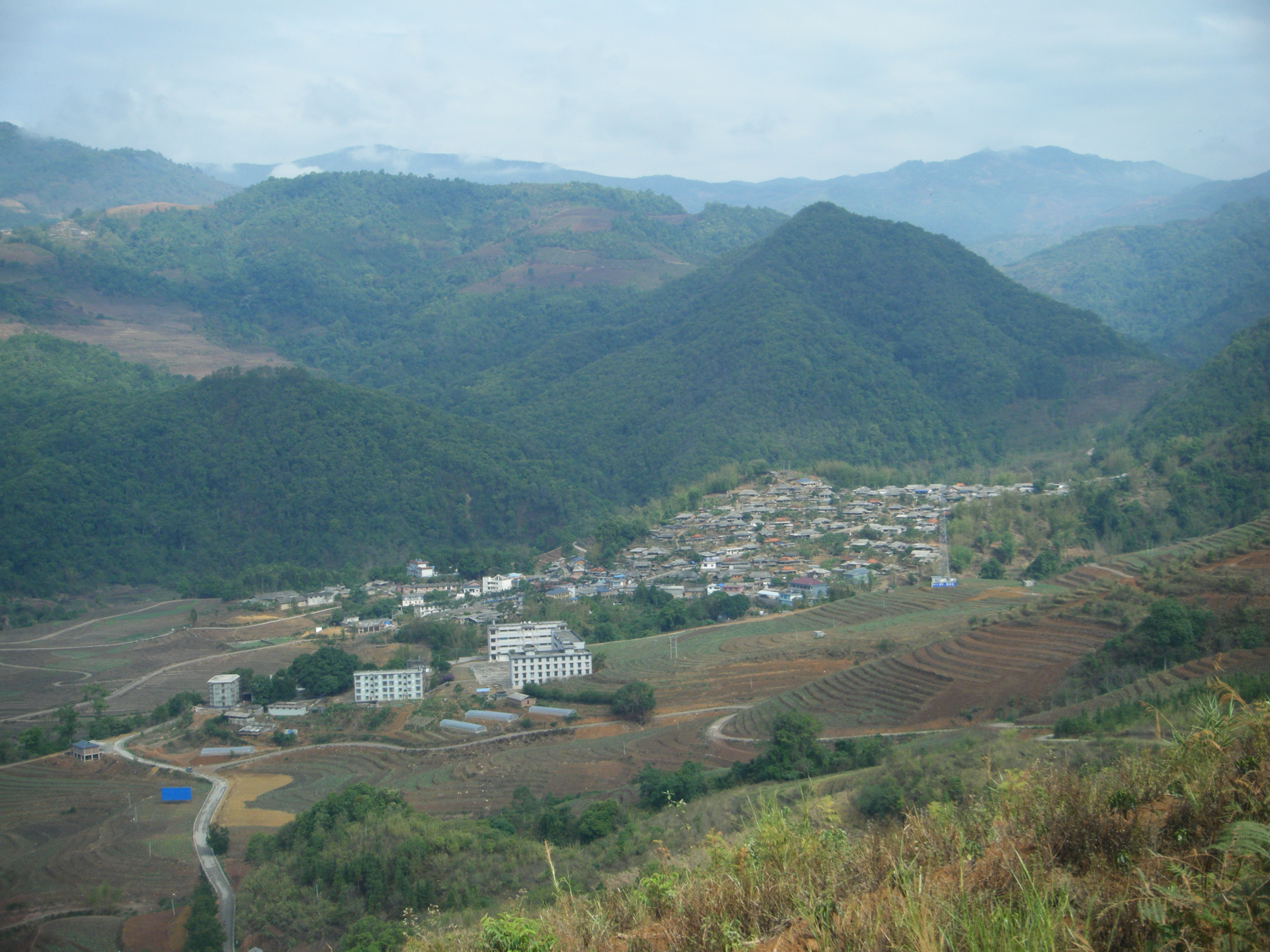

- Location of Ximeng County (red) and Pu'er City (pink) within Yunnan

- Location of the seat in Yunnan
- Coordinates: 22°38′40″N 99°35′24″E
- Country: China
- Province: Yunnan
- Prefecture-level city: Pu'er
- GB/T 2260 CODE: 530829
- County seat: Mengsuo

Area
  - Total: 1,391 km^{2} (537 sq mi)
- Elevation: 1,214 m (3,983 ft)

Population (2020 census)
  - Total: 87,291
  - Density: 62.75/km^{2} (162.5/sq mi)
- Time zone: UTC+8 (China Standard Time)
- Postal code: 665700
- Area code: 0879
- Website: www.ximeng.gov.cn
- ^{1}Yunnan Statistics Bureau^{2}Puer Gov.^{3}Yunnan Portal

Ximeng Va Autonomous County (Chinese: 西盟佤族自治县; pinyin: Xīméng Wǎzú Zìzhìxiàn; Awa: Si Mēng Vax Qux Zi Zi Sin or Si Mōung Vax Qux Zi Zi Sin) is an autonomous county under the jurisdiction of Pu'er City, in the southwest of Yunnan Province, China, bordering Myanmar's Shan State to the west. Wa/Va people, who speak the Wa language, are the main inhabitants in Ximeng County.

== Administrative divisions ==
In the present, Ximeng Va Autonomous County has 5 towns 1 township and 1 ethnic township.

5 towns

- Mengsuo (勐梭镇)
- Mengka (勐卡镇)
- Wenggake (翁嘎科镇)
- Zhongke (中课镇)
- Xinchang (新厂镇)

1 township

- Yuesong (岳宋乡)

1 ethnic township

- Lisuo Lahu Ethnic Township (力所拉祜族乡)

== Climate ==
Climate data for Ximeng, elevation 1,155 m (3,789 ft), (1991–2020 normals, extremes 1981–present)
Month	Jan	Feb	Mar	Apr	May	Jun	Jul	Aug	Sep	Oct	Nov	Dec	Year
Record high °C (°F)	27.4 (81.3)	28.6 (83.5)	31.6 (88.9)	33.4 (92.1)	33.5 (92.3)	33.2 (91.8)	31.4 (88.5)	31.8 (89.2)	32.2 (90.0)	30.4 (86.7)	29.0 (84.2)	25.8 (78.4)	33.5 (92.3)
Mean daily maximum °C (°F)	22.2 (72.0)	24.7 (76.5)	27.4 (81.3)	29.2 (84.6)	28.7 (83.7)	27.6 (81.7)	26.6 (79.9)	27.4 (81.3)	27.7 (81.9)	26.5 (79.7)	24.3 (75.7)	22.0 (71.6)	26.2 (79.2)
Daily mean °C (°F)	14.2 (57.6)	16.0 (60.8)	19.0 (66.2)	21.2 (70.2)	22.4 (72.3)	22.9 (73.2)	22.4 (72.3)	22.6 (72.7)	22.2 (72.0)	20.6 (69.1)	17.4 (63.3)	14.7 (58.5)	19.6 (67.4)
Mean daily minimum °C (°F)	9.4 (48.9)	10.2 (50.4)	13.0 (55.4)	15.8 (60.4)	18.2 (64.8)	20.2 (68.4)	20.2 (68.4)	20.1 (68.2)	19.3 (66.7)	17.4 (63.3)	13.6 (56.5)	10.6 (51.1)	15.7 (60.2)
Record low °C (°F)	5.1 (41.2)	6.3 (43.3)	8.7 (47.7)	10.4 (50.7)	12.4 (54.3)	17.6 (63.7)	18.1 (64.6)	16.4 (61.5)	10.9 (51.6)	11.1 (52.0)	7.9 (46.2)	6.1 (43.0)	5.1 (41.2)
Average precipitation mm (inches)	35.3 (1.39)	13.9 (0.55)	21.8 (0.86)	74.0 (2.91)	148.8 (5.86)	277.5 (10.93)	443.0 (17.44)	374.9 (14.76)	217.6 (8.57)	152.7 (6.01)	44.4 (1.75)	18.5 (0.73)	1,822.4 (71.76)
Average precipitation days (≥ 0.1 mm)	3.4	2.4	4.6	11.1	17.6	25.1	28.6	27.1	21.3	14.9	5.9	3.8	165.8
Average relative humidity (%)	75	65	61	65	75	85	88	87	85	83	80	80	77
Mean monthly sunshine hours	234.8	238.2	236.7	219.7	186.6	106.0	76.9	108.2	134.9	163.6	202.4	208.7	2,116.7
Percentage possible sunshine	69	74	63	58	46	26	19	27	37	46	61	63	49
Source: China Meteorological Administration all-time November high
