= Chen Fujin =

Chinese politician

- 陈福今

Chairperson of the Committee on Culture, Historical Data and Studies
- In office March 2008 – March 2013
- Preceded by: Wang Meng
- Succeeded by: Wang Taihua

Communist Party Secretary of the Chinese Academy of Governance
- In office December 1999 – June 2006
- Preceded by: Gui Shiyong
- Succeeded by: Jiang Yikang

Personal details
- Born: May 1941 (age 85) Shiping County, Yunnan, China
- Party: Chinese Communist Party
- Education: Peking University; Central Party School of the Chinese Communist Party

Chinese name
- Simplified Chinese: 陈福今
- Traditional Chinese: 陳福今
Transcriptions
Standard Mandarin
- Hanyu Pinyin: Chén Fújīn

Chen Fujin (Chinese: 陈福今; born May 1941) is a Chinese politician who served as Chinese Communist Party Committee Secretary of the Chinese Academy of Governance from 1999 to 2006. He was a member of the 15th CCP Central Commission for Discipline Inspection, a member of the Standing Committee of the 11th Chinese People's Political Consultative Conference, and a member of the 16th Central Committee of the Chinese Communist Party.

== Early life and education ==
Chen was born in Shiping County, Yunnan, in May 1941. In 1960, he was admitted to Peking University, majoring in philosophy. He joined the Chinese Communist Party (CCP) in July 1965. Two months later, he was assigned to the Political Department of the Ministry of Culture as an official. He worked at May Seventh Cadre School in Xianning, Hubei between 1969 and 1971. In March 1971, he was recalled to Beijing and was dispatched to Beijing Chemical Research Institute, an institute affiliated to China Petrochemical Corporation.

== Ministry of Coal Industry ==
Beginning in May 1975, he served in several posts in the Ministry of Coal Industry, including secretary of the minister, deputy director of the General Office, and vice president of the Information Institute. He was editor-in-chief of China Coal News in December 1982, and held that office until March 1986.

== General Office of the Chinese Communist Party ==
In March 1986, he was dispatched to the General Office of the Chinese Communist Party, where he was eventually promoted to deputy director in May 1993.

== Chinese Academy of Governance ==
He was appointed Chinese Communist Party Committee Secretary of the Chinese Academy of Governance in December 1999, concurrently holding the executive vice president position.

== Chinese People's Political Consultative Conference ==
In March 2008, he became chairperson of the Committee on Culture, Historical Data and Studies, a post he kept until his retirement in March 2013.

Party political offices
Preceded by Gui Shiyong	Communist Party Secretary of the Chinese Academy of Governance; 1999–2006	Succeeded by Jiang Yikang
Assembly seats
Preceded by Wang Meng	Chairperson of the Committee on Culture, Historical Data and Studies; 2008–2013	Succeeded by Wang Taihua
