= Tiao-kuai =

Quasi-federal administration in China

The tiao-kuai system (Chinese: 条块; pinyin: tiáo-kuài; lit. 'branch and lump'), also known as tiaotiao-kuaikuai (Chinese: 条条块块; pinyin: tiáotiáo-kuàikuài), forms the matrix of vertical (tiao) and horizontal (kuai) authority in the People's Republic of China. It is Chinese Communist Party's primary operational mechanism through which its principle of democratic centralism functions within PRC's unified state apparatus.

According to political scientist Kenneth Lieberthal, the "former coordinates according to function ([for] example, environment); the latter coordinates according to the needs of the locality that it governs." Thus, a local environmental protection bureau may have reporting responsibilities to both the central government's State Environmental Protection Administration and to the mayor of the city in which it is located. This systemic dynamic differs from dual leadership, a formalised institutional rule that mandates explicit vertical and horizontal accountability for specific organs, such as the Supreme People's Procuratorate and within the Central Commission for Discipline Inspection.

Constitutionally, organizations in both the functional and territorial systems of governance are assigned to a system of ranks. Central ministries are at the same rank as provincial governments. Lieberthal writes: "One key rule of the Chinese system is that units of the same rank cannot issue binding orders to each other. Operationally, this means that no ministry can issue a binding order to a province." Therefore, a province may challenge, overrule, or ignore decisions made by a ministry. This two-dimensional arrangement sometimes creates undesirable conflicts, and there have been calls for tiao-kuai integration (Chinese: 条块结合; pinyin: tiáo-kuài jiéhé), although this is unlikely to occur due to resistance from the provinces.

== Under Maoist rule ==
In 1949, the Chinese Communist Revolution established the People's Republic of China, a constitutionally communist state. While China experimented with centralization and decentralization policies for a few years, the Anti-Rightist Movement in 1957 solidified the principle of ideological unity among all local governments. During the Cultural Revolution, and especially the 1971-1975 "unified income and unified expenditure" (统收统支) period, bureaucrats across China implemented similar agricultural and industrial policies modeled in Beijing.

== In the reform era ==
With the death of Mao Zedong and the beginning of the reform and opening up, China adopted a policy of "emancipation of mind" (思想解放) as the government sought practical solutions to economic problems that reflected local conditions. Provinces were given substantial economic and political authority, such as to authorize investment projects and raise their own taxes. The State Planning Commission's mandate shifted from giving annual targets to planning for the medium and long term. The central government further established special economic zones within the coastal provinces, which the relevant subnational governments have operated and expanded upon, even establishing sister city relations internationally.

Decentralization posed a problem for the central government in that the central government had no independent means of enforcing its authority to prevent local protectionism or enforce standards. Hence in the 1990s, the PRC government began creating parallel central organizations to those of the provinces. Most of these organizations deal with economic regulations. Devolution of political power to provincial People's Congresses have also occasionally caused vertical conflict, such as when Beijing appointed Ge Hongsheng as the Governor of Zhejiang, who was not reelected by the Zhejiang legislature in 1993. The central government now consults with provincial representatives before making sensitive personnel appointments.

On the other hand, the rapid rise in the number of prefecture-level cities as a result of urbanization has checked the power of the provinces. The Central Military Commission's control over the People's Liberation Army (PLA) also precludes the possibility of local separatists colluding with the military against the central government.

== Comparisons to other countries ==
An analogous situation can be seen in federal systems such as the United States where the federal and state governments operate in parallel, but neither has the authority to command the other in relation to reserve powers or federal powers expressly delegated to the national government, although the power relationships are similar the actual powers exercised can be quite different. For example, there are parallel institutions for police and financial securities regulation in the United States, but not in the PRC.

== See also ==
- Administrative divisions of China
- Federalism in China
