= Dual subordination =

Democratic centralist principle of communist states

Dual subordination, also referred to as double subordination or dual leadership, is a term to describe the vertical and horizontal accountability mechanisms in democratic centralism, and is a governance principle in communist states.

== Origins ==
Dual subordination has its origins in the conflict between the supreme executive and administrative organ of the Russian Soviet Federative Socialist Republic (Russian SFSR) and the permanent organs of provincial state organs of power. These permanent organs argued that the executive and administrative organ at their corresponding level were horizontally accountable to them, while the supreme executive and administrative organ stressed that they were vertically accountable to them. The conflict was solved by instituting dual subordination: introducing the principle of vertical and horizontal accountability. Theoretically, this conflict arose as a result of Vladimir Lenin's conflicting aims: both seeking maximum state centralization and ensuring that the state was of the people.

In the October Revolution's aftermath, the Bolsheviks sought to establish a system of state organs of power with a supreme state organ of power at its apex, the All-Russian Congress of Soviets. Later, on 9 November 1917, the Council of People's Commissars was established as the supreme administrative and executive organ of this new state. This institution reestablished the ministerial structure in the form of people's commissariats, and sought to establish centralised control throughout the Russian SFSR. However, having also launched the revolution on the slogan of "All Power to the Soviets", these state organs of power took over the state apparatus at their corresponding level. Formal decisions from this period also testify to this, granting these organs within their jurisdiction unlimited power. For example, the People's Commissariat for Internal Affairs issued a document that stated it worked to "unifying the activities of all the organs of local administration, which the Soviets have now become", and invited the lower-level state organs of power to hold them accountable for work they did within their jurisdiction. However, at the same time, it was clarified that lower-level state organs of power had to implement the decisions of higher-level organs, not only those of higher state organs of power but also those of the Council of People's Commissars.

The first communist state constitution of 1918 stipulated that lower-level organs of power had supreme and unlimited power within their jurisdictions, but were subordinate to higher-level state organs, both higher-level state organs of power or inferior state organs at a higher level. This meant that higher-level state organs of power and their inferior state organs within the unified state apparatus had to go through lower-level state organs of power and their permanent organs to have their policies implemented. In July 1918, the central government convened a conference of provincial-level people's commissariats of justice around the country, which went on to criticise the high-handedness of All-Russian Extraordinary Commission for Combating Counter-Revolution and Sabotage, also known as the Cheka. The conference reported that the Cheka, in many cases, refused to respect the authority of provincial state organs of power and their permanent organ, and in some cases, issued orders to them.

This debate continued into the 8th Congress of the Russian Communist Party (Bolsheviks), held in 1919, when officials from provincial state organs of power again decried the lack of respect for their institutional authority. Now it was reported that in several cases, the central commissariats had attempted to remove permanent organs in the provinces that tried to hold them accountable. However, the most normal method of bypassing the provincial state organs of power was, firstly, by the people's commissariats opening offices in the provinces that did not report to the local state organ of power and its permanent organ in whose jurisdiction it operated. Secondly, the people's commissariats sought to bring the provincial-level apparatus that operated under the local state organ of power under its own control, isolating the state organs of power from their own apparat. Those opposing these measures legitimised their criticism through the slogan of "All power to the Soviets". In contrast, defenders of the people's commissariat legitimized their position by invoking the necessity of centralism.

The Seventh All-Russian Congress of Soviets of Workers’, Peasants’, Cossacks’ and Red Army Deputies, convened on 5–9 December 1919, instituted a compromise in the form of dual subordination. The permanent organs of the provincial state organs of power failed in their bid to enforce the central state apparatus to go through them when implementing their decisions. Instead, the administrative offices of the state organs of power were fixed across the land, and the central people's commissariats had to act through these offices. The resolution stated, "The offices of a [permanent organ] shall be subordinated to that [permanent organ] and shall be bound to carry out all the orders and instructions of the [permanent organ] as well as those of the corresponding offices of every higher [permanent organ] and of the corresponding People's Commissariats." The heads of the local apparat were to be appointed by a joint decision of the relevant state organ of power and the relevant people's commissariat. Institutionally, the lower-level state organs of power were transformed into supervisors that held the local apparat accountable.

== China ==
In China, dual subordination manifests in two distinct ways. First, there is a formally prescribed institutional rule known as dual leadership, which applies to specific organs in which the appointment of leading personnel requires joint horizontal approval from an organ at the corresponding level and vertical approval from a superior organ, with the latter holding primary authority, as seen in the appointment of chief procurators within the Supreme People's Procuratorate (SPP) and leading cadres within the Central Commission for Discipline Inspection (CCDI). Second, as the overarching, fluid dynamic of negotiation known as tiao-kuai, which characterizes vertical (central) and horizontal (local) relations across the unified state apparatus, beyond those organs under dual leadership.

The SPP was placed under dual leadership on 3 September 1951, when the Central People's Government Council adopted regulations governing the SPP's work and that of lower-level procuratorates. The "General Regulations Governing the Organisation of Offices of People's Procurators of Various Levels" stipulated dual leadership in the form of lower-level procuratorates being accountable to the government council at the corresponding level and to the procuratorate's office above. This replaced the old system of vertical accountability, in which lower-level procuratorates were only accountable to the level above. The change was legitimised by the fact that the old vertical structure had been difficult to enforce. However, with the adoption of the "Organic Law of the People's Procuratorates" on 21 September 1954, vertical leadership was reintroduced due to the perceived low quality level of cadres at lower levels. When the organic law was amended again in 1979, dual leadership was reinstituted. This entails that the procuratorates, instead of being independent of politics, are political organs responsible to the state organs of power at the corresponding level and the procuratorate above. Despite being accountable to both, the SPP leads a unified system of procuratorial organs in a unified manner in line with democratic centralism, and this process is known as procuratorial integration. This means that the SPP can issue directives and mandates to procuratorates at all levels of governance.

This dual leadership framework extends beyond judicial and disciplinary organs to key administrative departments. In China, entities such as the public security organs and departments, audit organs, and statistical organs operate under a dual leadership system, with professional and operational guidance led by the superior organ. While lower-level organs retain primary authority over general cadre management, the appointment of their principal leaders requires consultation or consent from the superior department, institutionalizing a vertical check within the personnel system.

== Soviet Union ==
In the economic sphere, centralisation in the form of dual subordination was a key feature of the Soviet state. For example, a financial department of a city state organ of power in the Soviet Union was horizontally accountable to the city state organ of power and vertically accountable to the provincial finance department. However, in the case of the state budget process, the finance department was, in reality, more beholden vertically than horizontally. However, other departments could be more beholden horizontally than vertically: it depended on how important the central state authorities deemed the process to be. Thus, lower-level finance departments did not campaign for local self-interests within the Ministry of Finance. Soviet scholar Grant Ayvazyan. a specialist on the Soviet state budget process, noted, "‘Dual subordination with regard to local financial organs has a greater degree of vertical subordination compared to other departments and administrations of the [permanent organs]."
