= Kang Yi =

Kang Yi, may refer to:

- Kang Yi (politician, born 1940), Chinese politician, deputy director of the State Non-Ferrous Metal Industry Bureau
- Kang Yi (politician, born 1966), Chinese politician, director of the National Bureau of Statistics

== See also ==
- Yi Kang
