= Ma Jiantang =

Chinese economist and politician

- 马建堂
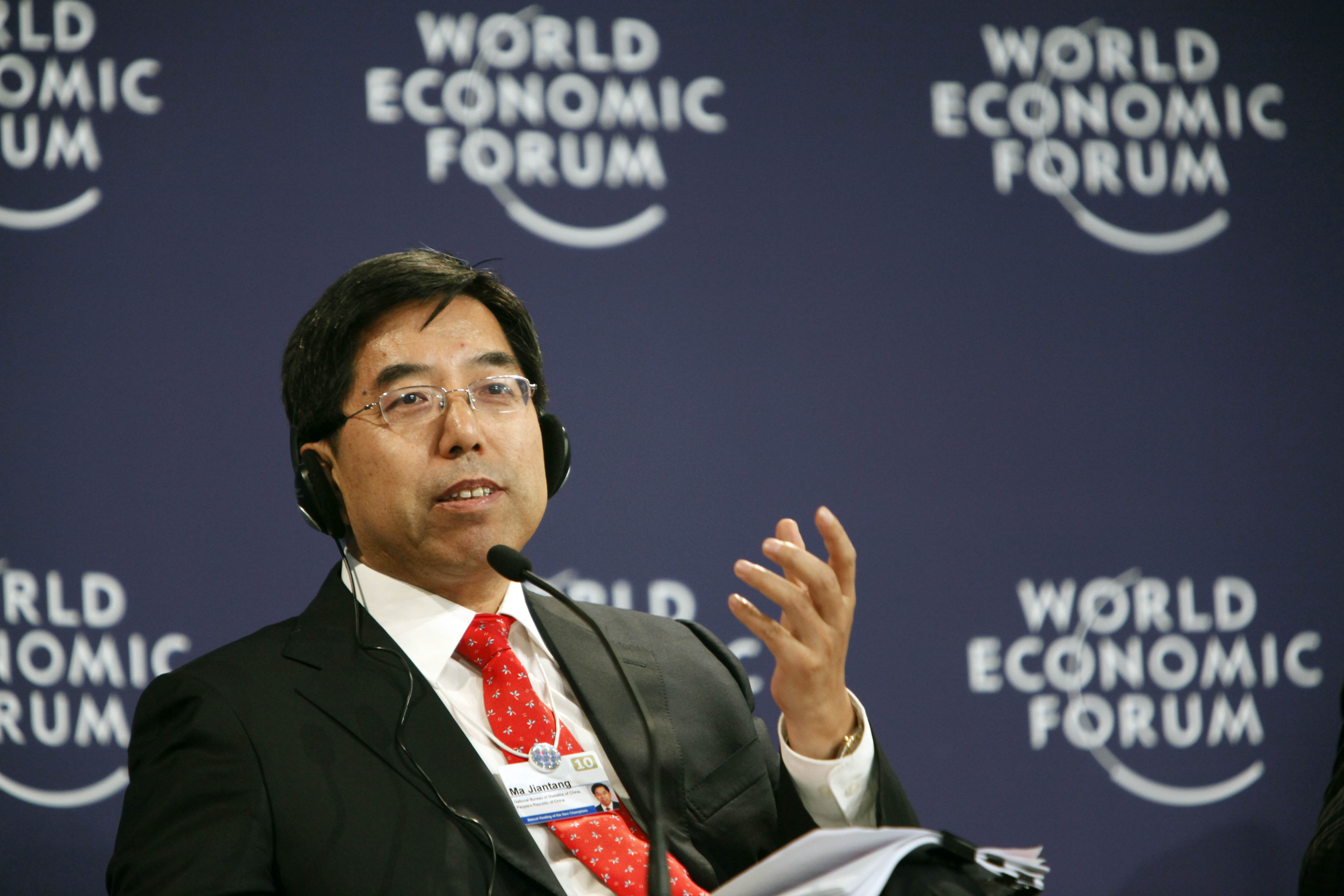
- Ma Jiantang in 2010

Party Branch Secretary of Development Research Center of the State Council
- In office March 2018 – June 2022
- Premier: Li Keqiang
- Preceded by: Wang Anshun
- Succeeded by: Lu Hao

Director of the National Bureau of Statistics
- In office September 2008 – April 2015
- Premier: Wen Jiabao; Li Keqiang
- Preceded by: Xie Fuzhan
- Succeeded by: Wang Bao'an

Personal details
- Born: April 1958 (age 68) Binzhou, Shandong, China
- Party: Chinese Communist Party
- Education: Shandong University

Chinese name
- Simplified Chinese: 马建堂
- Traditional Chinese: 馬建堂
Transcriptions
Standard Mandarin
- Hanyu Pinyin: Mǎ Jiàntáng

Ma Jiantang (Chinese: 马建堂; born April 29, 1958) is a Chinese economist and politician. He was director of the National Bureau of Statistics from 2008 to 2015, executive vice-president of Academy of Governance (minister-level rank) from 2015 to 2018, and party branch secretary of Development Research Center of the State Council from 2018 to 2022.

== Life and career ==
Born in Binzhou, Shandong, Ma graduated from the Department of Economics of Shandong University in 1982, and earned a master's degree at Nankai University in 1985. He received his doctorate from the Chinese Academy of Social Sciences in 1988. Ma won the Sun Yefang Economics Prize in 1994 while serving on the Development Research Center of the State Council, he received the Chinese Economic Theory Innovation award In 2012.

He served as the Director of General Department, SETC from 1996 to 2003, and was Deputy Secretary of SASAC from 2003 to 2008. From 2004 to 2007, he was vice governor of Qinghai, a province located in northwest China. He served as the Director of China NBS from 2008 to 2014.

Ma was elected to the 18th Central Committee of the Chinese Communist Party as an alternate member in November 2012. Ma was ranked first out of 168 alternate members in a list ordered by the number of votes received at the party congress. Ma was made a full member of the committee at the 3rd Plenum of the 18th Central committee in 2014 to replace a vacant seat.

Government offices
Preceded by Xie Fuzhan	Director of the National Bureau of Statistics; 2008–2015	Succeeded by Wang Bao'an
Preceded by He Jiacheng	Executive Vice President of the Chinese Academy of Governance; 2015–2018	Succeeded by He Yiting
Preceded by Wang Anshun	Party Branch Secretary of Development Research Center of the State Council; 2018–2022	Succeeded by Lu Hao
