= Zhao Shihong =

Chinese politician

- 赵世洪

Communist Party Secretary of Langfang
- In office January 2008 – October 2013
- Preceded by: Wang Zengli
- Succeeded by: Wang Xiaodong

Personal details
- Born: May 1962 (age 64) Changchun, Jilin, China
- Party: Chinese Communist Party
- Education: Peking University

Chinese name
- Simplified Chinese: 赵世洪
- Traditional Chinese: 趙世洪
Transcriptions
Standard Mandarin
- Hanyu Pinyin: Zhào Shìhóng

Zhao Shihong (Chinese: 赵世洪; born May 1962) is a former Chinese politician of Manchu who served as party secretary of Langfang from 2008 to 2013. He was investigated by China's top anti-graft agency in March 2023.

== Early life and education ==
Zhao was born in Changchun, Jilin, in May 1962. In 1980, he was accepted to Peking University, where he majored in national economic management. He joined the Chinese Communist Party (CCP) in January 1984, upon graduation.

== Career ==
After graduating in 1984, Zhao was assigned to the State Planning Commission (now National Development and Reform Commission). He was eventually promoted to director of the Comprehensive Department of the Policy Research Office in February 1997. In December 1998, he was transferred to the Comprehensive Research Department of the State Council Research Office, where he was promoted to deputy director in December 1999 and to director in December 2001.

He was assistant governor of Hebei in December 2004, in addition to serving as director and party secretary of the State-owned Assets Supervision and Administration Commission of the Hebei Provincial Government. In January 2008, he was made party secretary of Langfang, it would be his first job as "first-in-charge" of a prefecture-level city.

In October 2013, he was appointed secretary of the Secretariat of the All-China Federation of Trade Unions, concurrently serving as director of Network Work Department since July 2016.

In October 2018, he was chosen as party secretary of China Professionals-Workers Int'l Travelservice Head Office.

== Downfall ==
On 14 March 2023, Zhao was put under investigation for alleged "serious violations of discipline and laws" by the Central Commission for Discipline Inspection (CCDI), the party's internal disciplinary body, and the National Supervisory Commission, the highest anti-corruption agency of China.

Government offices
Preceded by Wang Zengli	Communist Party Secretary of the State-owned Assets Supervision and Administration Commission of the Hebei Provincial Government; 2005–2008	Succeeded by Zhou Jie
Party political offices
Preceded by Wang Zengli	Communist Party Secretary of Langfang; 2008–2013	Succeeded by Wang Xiaodong
