= List of Chinese provincial-level divisions by natural growth rate =

This is a list of the first-level administrative divisions of the People's Republic of China (P.R.C.), including all provinces, autonomous regions, special administrative regions and municipalities, in order of their natural growth rate in 2014. Here, natural growth rate refers to the birth rate minus the death rate, i.e. the effects of migration are not considered. The unit is per thousand.

The figures are from the China Statistical Yearbook 2015 published by the Bureau of Statistics of the PRC.

Color	Regions of China
	North China
	East China
	Southwestern China
	Northwestern China
	South Central China
	Northeast China

Rank	Name	Region	Growth rate (‰)
1	Xinjiang	Northwestern China	11.47
2	Tibet	Southwestern China	10.55
3	Hainan	South Central China	8.61
4	Ningxia	Northwestern China	8.57
5	Qinghai	Northwestern China	8.49
6	Guangxi	South Central China	7.86
7	Fujian	East China	7.50
8	Shandong	East China	7.39
9	Jiangxi	East China	6.98
10	Anhui	East China	6.97
11	Hebei	North China	6.95
12	Hunan	South Central China	6.63
13	Yunnan	Southwestern China	6.20
14	Guangdong	South Central China	6.10
15	Gansu	Northwestern China	6.10
16	Guizhou	Southwestern China	5.80
17	Henan	South Central China	5.78
18	Zhejiang	East China	5.00
19	Shanxi	North China	4.99
20	Hubei	South Central China	4.90
21	Beijing	North China	4.83
22	Shaanxi	Northwestern China	3.87
23	Chongqing	Southwestern China	3.62
24	Inner Mongolia	North China	3.56
25	Sichuan	Southwestern China	3.20
26	Shanghai	East China	3.14
27	Jiangsu	East China	2.43
28	Tianjin	North China	2.14
29	Heilongjiang	Northeast China	0.91
30	Jilin	Northeast China	0.40
31	Liaoning	Northeast China	0.26
32	Hong Kong		
33	Macau		
National Total			5.21
