= Committee on Culture, Historical Data and Studies =

Special Committee of the CPPCC National Committee

- 中国人民政治协商会议全国委员会 文化文史和学习委员会
- Formation: March 16, 2018
- Type: Special committee of the CPPCC
- Location: Beijing
- Chairperson: Vacant
- Parent organization: National Committee of the Chinese People's Political Consultative Conference

Chinese name
- Simplified Chinese: 中国人民政治协商会议全国委员会文化文史和学习委员会
- Traditional Chinese: 中國人民政治協商會議全國委員會文化文史和學習委員會
Transcriptions
Standard Mandarin
- Hanyu Pinyin: Zhōngguó Rénmín Zhèngzhì Xiéshāng Huìyì Quánguó Wěiyuánhuì Wénhuà Wénshǐ Hé Xuéxí Wěiyuánhuì

Shortest form
- Simplified Chinese: 全国政协文化文史和学习委员会
- Traditional Chinese: 全國政協文化文史和學習委員會
Transcriptions
Standard Mandarin
- Hanyu Pinyin: Quánguó Zhèngxié Wénhuà Wénshǐ Hé Xuéxí Wěiyuánhuì

The Committee on Culture, Historical Data and Studies is one of ten special committees of the National Committee of the Chinese People's Political Consultative Conference, China's top political advisory body and a central part of the Chinese Communist Party's united front system.

== History ==
The History and Study Committee was renamed to the Culture, History and Study Committee in March 2018 during the 13th National Committee of the Chinese People's Political Consultative Conference as part of the deepening the reform of the Party and state institutions.

== List of chairpersons ==
No.	Chairpersons	Took office	Left office	Notes
7th	Hu Sheng	June 1988	May 1993	
7th	Sun Xiaocun	June 1988	21 May 1993	
8th	Xu Weicheng	21 May 1993	15 March 1998	
8th	Yang Zhengmin	15 May 1993	16 March 1998	
9th	Zhu Zuolin	16 March 1998	15 March 2003	
10th	Gui Shiyong	15 March 2003	28 February 2005	
10th	Wang Meng	28 February 2005	15 March 2008	
11th	Chen Fujin	15 March 2008	13 March 2013	
12th	Wang Taihua	13 March 2013	16 March 2018	
13th	Song Dahan	16 March 2018	13 March 2023	
14th	Wu Yingjie	13 March 2023	24 July 2024	

== See also ==
- Committee of Education, Science, Health and Sports
- Education, Science, Culture and Public Health Committee of the NPC
