= State apparatus =

State apparatus may refer to:

- Unified state apparatus, the state structure of communist states
- State (polity), the state as a polity
