= Draft Constitution of the People's Republic of Japan =

1946 proposal for a socialist Japan

The Draft Constitution of People's Republic of Japan (日本人民共和国憲法草案, Nihon Jinmin Kyōwakoku Kenpō Sōan) was a draft constitution released by the Japanese Communist Party on 28 June 1946. This draft was published during debates on the new Japanese Constitution following the end of World War II.

The characteristics of the draft are the abolition of the Japanese Imperial system, the adoption of republicanism and democratic centralism, and the introduction of socialist policies.
