= Ning Jizhe =

Chinese politician

- 宁吉喆
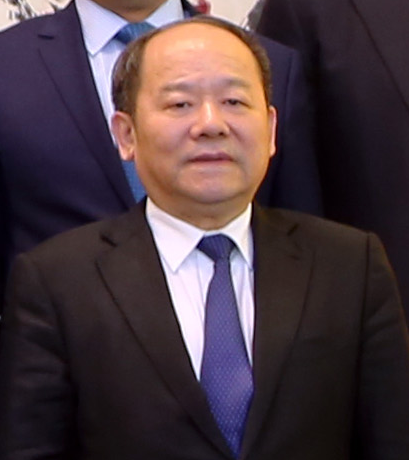
- Ning Jizhe in 2018

Director of the National Bureau of Statistics
- In office March 2016 – March 2022
- Premier: Li Keqiang
- Preceded by: Wang Bao'an
- Succeeded by: Kang Yi

Director of the State Council Research Office
- In office June 2013 – August 2015
- Premier: Li Keqiang
- Preceded by: Xie Fuzhan
- Succeeded by: Huang Shouhong

Personal details
- Born: December 1956 (age 69) Hefei, Anhui, China
- Party: Chinese Communist Party
- Education: Hefei University of Technology (BE); Renmin University (PhD)

Ning Jizhe (Chinese: 宁吉喆; pinyin: Níng Jízhé; born December 1956) is a Chinese economist and former the director of the National Bureau of Statistics of China and Vice Chairman of the National Development and Reform Commission (minister-level rank). Ning is a Non-Executive Director of the Board of Directors of China Investment Corporation.

== Education ==
Ning Jizhe received a Bachelor of Engineering with a major in electric machinery from the Hefei University of Technology in 1982 and a Doctor of Philosophy in Economics from the Renmin University of China in 1988.

== Biography ==
Ning was born in Hefei, Anhui province, and traces his ancestry to Xia County, Shanxi province. During the late stages of the Cultural Revolution, Ning worked as a production team leader at a local commune. After economics reforms began in 1978, Ning went back to school, studying engineering at the Hefei University of Technology. After spending a year working as a technician, he began pursuing graduate degrees at Renmin University.

Ning joined the Chinese Communist Party in June 1985. He earned his doctorate in economics in 1988, after which he joined the National Planning Commission, a central economic planning agency. In November 1998, he joined the planning department of the National Development and Reform Commission. Beginning in 2001, Ning began specializing in the development strategy of China's far western regions. In April 2007, he joined the State Council Research Office, rising to become its director in August 2013. In August 2015, Ning was transferred laterally back to the NDRC, heading up work in economic planning and the use of foreign capital. In March 2016, he also took over the role of the director of the National Bureau of Statistics, whose previous director, Wang Bao'an, had been sacked for corruption. In March 2022, he was appointed vice chairman of the Committee for Economic Affairs of the Chinese People's Political Consultative Conference.

Government offices
| Preceded by Xie Fuzhan | Director of the State Council Research Office; 2013–2015 | Succeeded by Huang Shouhong |
| Preceded by Wang Bao'an | Director of the National Bureau of Statistics; 2016–2022 | Succeeded by Kang Yi |
Civic offices
| Preceded by Ma Jiantang | President of the Commerce Statistical Society of China; 2017–present | Incumbent |
