= Sun Yefang =

Chinese economist (1908–1983)

- 孙冶方
- Born: 24 October 1908; Wuxi County, Jiangsu, Qing China
- Died: 22 February 1983 (aged 74); Beijing, China
- Other names: Xue Eguo, Sun Mianzhi, Song Liang
- Occupation: Economist
- Years active: 1950s–1980s
- Spouse: Feng Keping

Academic background
- Education: Moscow Sun Yat-sen University

Academic work
- Discipline: Economics
- Sub-discipline: Marxist economics Socialist market economy
- Institutions: Institute of Economics, Chinese Academy of Social Sciences; National Bureau of Statistics of China; State Planning Commission
- Notable students: Gui Shiyong
- Notable works: Selected Works of Sun Yefang

Chinese name
- Traditional Chinese: 孫冶方
- Simplified Chinese: 孙冶方
Transcriptions
Standard Mandarin
- Hanyu Pinyin: Sūn Yěfāng

Xue Eguo
- Chinese: 薛萼果
Transcriptions
Standard Mandarin
- Hanyu Pinyin: Xuē Èguǒ

Sun Mianzhi
- Traditional Chinese: 孫勉之
- Simplified Chinese: 孙勉之
Transcriptions
Standard Mandarin
- Hanyu Pinyin: Sūn Miǎnzhī

Song Liang
- Chinese: 宋亮
Transcriptions
Standard Mandarin
- Hanyu Pinyin: Sòng Liàng

Sun Yefang (Chinese: 孙冶方; 24 October 1908 – 22 February 1983) was a pioneering Chinese economist.

== Biography ==
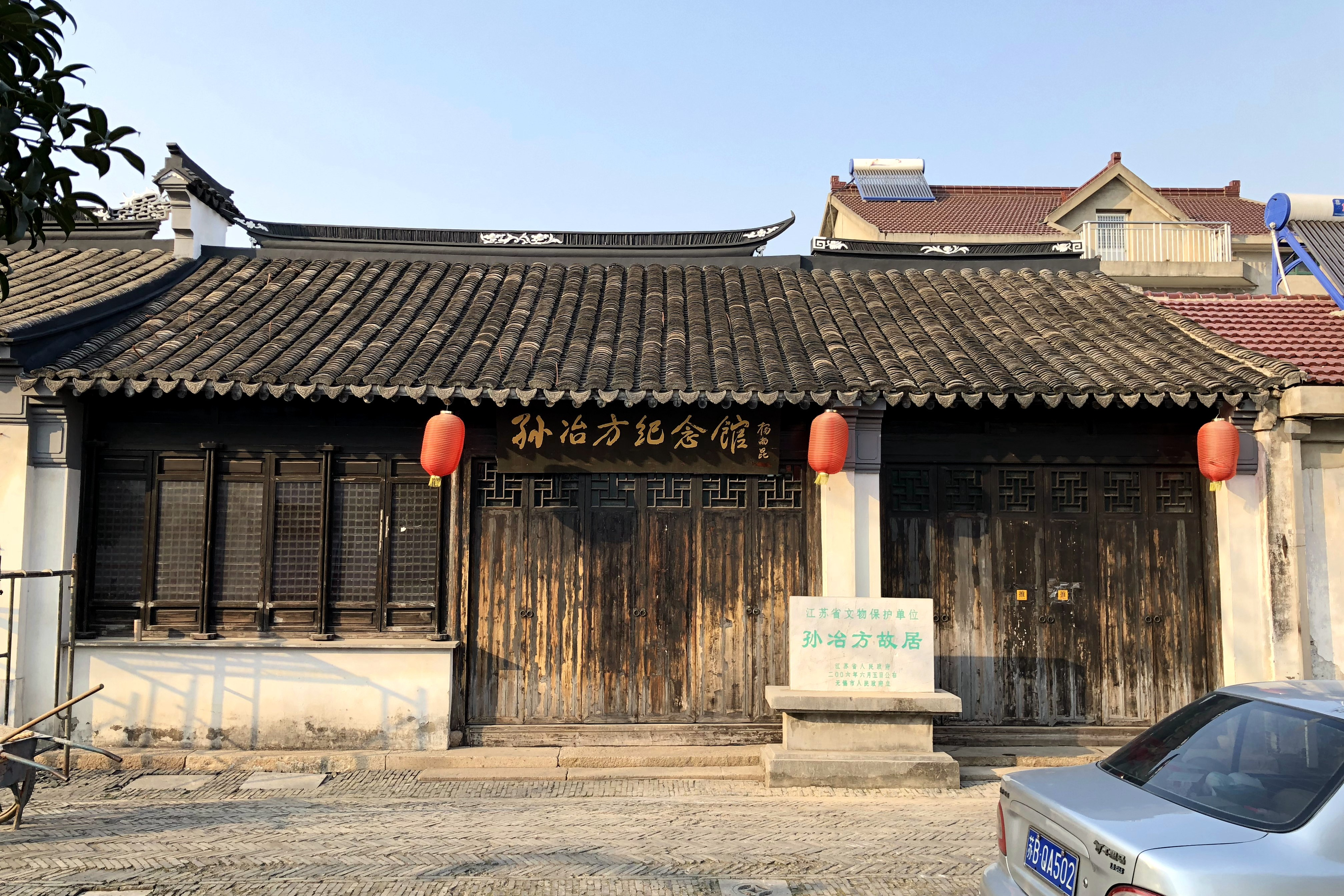
Former Residence of Sun Yefang

Sun was born in Wuxi County (now Wuxi), Jiangsu, on 24 October 1908. His elder brother Xue Mingjian (1895–1980) was a politician in the government of the Republic of China. His cousin Xue Muqiao was an economist and politician.

He studied at Sun Yat-sen University and after graduation, he taught political economy and translation at Sun Yat-sen University and at Moscow East Worker University.

In 1930, he returned to China to take part in organizing the China Rural Economy Research Association. He also edited the journal Zhongguo Nongcun (中国农村, Rural China).

After the Chinese Civil War, he held positions as head of the Department of Heavy Industry, Shanghai municipal Military Control Commission; Assistant Commissioner, State Statistical Bureau; Director, Economics Institute at the Chinese Academy of Sciences; Commissioner, Fifth Session of Chinese People's Political Consultative Conference; Delegate, 12th National Party Congress; member, Advisory Commission of the Central Committee of the CCP; member, State Council Academic Appraisal Committee.

Sun advocated market-oriented reforms and was denounced by Maoists as "China's Liberman" (referring to the Khrushchev-era economist Evsei Liberman) as a result of a damaging association with Liu Shaoqi, who was known as "China's Khrushchev".

He was associated with the career of pioneer post-Marxist Chinese liberal economist Gu Zhun, acting as the latter's protector during anti-Rightist purges to which he himself was eventually to succumb.

== Personal life ==
Sun married Feng Keping (洪克平), and had an adopted daughter named Li Zhao (李昭).
