= Gui Shiyong =

Chinese politician

- 桂世镛

Director of the State Council Research Office
- In office March 1998 – February 2001
- Premier: Zhu Rongji
- Preceded by: Wang Mengkui
- Succeeded by: Wei Liqun

Personal details
- Born: February 1935 Hangzhou, Zhejiang, China
- Died: 28 November 2003 (aged 68) Beijing, China
- Party: Chinese Communist Party
- Education: Renmin University of China

Chinese name
- Simplified Chinese: 桂世镛
- Traditional Chinese: 桂世鏞
Transcriptions
Standard Mandarin
- Hanyu Pinyin: Guì Shìyōng

Gui Shiyong (Chinese: 桂世镛; February 1935 – 28 November 2003) was a Chinese economist and politician who served as director of the State Council Research Office from 1998 to 2001.

He was a member of the Standing Committee of the 9th and 10th Chinese People's Political Consultative Conference. He was a representative of the 14th and 15th National Congress of the Chinese Communist Party. He was an alternate member of the 13th and 14th Central Committee of the Chinese Communist Party, and a member of the 15th Central Committee of the Chinese Communist Party.

== Biography ==
Gui was born in Hangzhou, Zhejiang, in February 1935. In 1950, he entered the Renmin University of China, majoring in industrial planning. He joined the Chinese Communist Party (CCP) in July 1956. He became an assistant research fellow of the Chinese Academy of Sciences in September 1956, and served until November 1969, when he was sent to the May Seventh Cadre Schools to do farm works in Qianjiang, Hubei. During his term in office, he studied economics under eminent economist Sun Yefang. During the Cultural Revolution, Gui, alongside Sun Shangqing, Liu Guoguang, Dong Fureng and other four economists were labeled as "Eight Heavenly Guardians" (八大金刚) of the "Anti-Party Alliance" (反党联盟) of Zhang Wentian and Sun Yefang, and was also denounced as the "Revisionist Seedling" (修正主义苗子) cultivated by Sun Yefang. HisSeventy Articles of Industry (工业七十条) and its propaganda materials were criticized as "Big Poisonous Weeds" (大毒草) by the Red Guards.

Starting in March 1973, he successively served as research fellow, deputy director, and director of the State Planning Commission (now National Development and Reform Commission). He was eventually promoted to secretary-general in June 1988. From March 1987 to June 1988, he also served a short term as deputy editor-in-chief of the People's Daily, the mouthpiece of the Chinese Communist Party. In September 1988, he became deputy director of the State Council Research Office, rising to director in March 1998. He concurrently served as vice president of the Chinese Academy of Governance between July 1994 and November 1999.

On 28 November 2003, he died from an illness in Beijing, at the age of 68.

== Publications ==
- 桂世镛集 [Selected Works of Gui Shiyong] (in Chinese). Beijing: China Social Sciences Press. 2019. ISBN 9787520335553.
- 改革开放发展的理论与实践 [Theory and Practice of Reform and Opening Up] (in Chinese). Beijing: China Yanshi Publishing House. 2018. ISBN 9787517125518.
- 桂世镛文集 [Collected Works of Gui Shiyong] (in Chinese). Beijing: China Yanshi Publishing House. 2007. ISBN 9787801289179.
- WTO与政府工作手册 [WTO and Government Work Manuals] (in Chinese). Beijing: Xinhua Press. 2003. ISBN 9787501156818.
- 世纪之交的中国经济 [Chinese Economy at the turn of the Century] (in Chinese). Guangzhou, Guangdong: Guangdong Economic Publishing House. 2001. ISBN 9787806770481.
- 中华人民共和国国民经济和社会发展计划大事辑要 [Highlights of the National Economic and Social Development Plan of the People's Republic of China] (in Chinese). Beijing: Red Flag Press. 1987. ISBN 9787505100084.
- 论中国宏观经济管理 [On China's Macroeconomic Management] (in Chinese). Beijing: China Economic Publishing House. 1987. ISBN 9787501700288.

Government offices
Preceded by Wang Mengkui	Director of the State Council Research Office; 1998–2001	Succeeded by Wei Liqun
