= Regulations on Work of the Central Committee of the Chinese Communist Party =

Rules of the Chinese Communist Party

- Simplified Chinese: 中国共产党中央委员会工作条例
- Traditional Chinese: 中國共產黨中央委員會工作條例
Transcriptions
Standard Mandarin
- Hanyu Pinyin: Zhōngguó Gòngchǎndǎng Zhōngyāng Wěiyuánhuì Gōngzuò Tiáolì

The Regulations on Work of the Central Committee of the Chinese Communist Party are working regulations formulated and promulgated by Politburo of the Chinese Communist Party to provide basic guidelines for strengthening the work of the Central Committee of the Chinese Communist Party.

== History ==
On 28 September 2020, the Politburo of the Chinese Communist Party held a meeting to review the Regulations on Work of the Central Committee of the Chinese Communist Party. Xi Jinping, general secretary of the CCP Central Committee, presided over the meeting. On 30 September 2020, the Central Committee of the Chinese Communist Party issued the regulations.

== Content ==
The Regulations name the CCP's National Congress and the Central Committee that it creates as the CCP's "highest leadership body". It states that when the National Congress is not in session, the Central Committee leads the CCP's work and represents it externally. It establishes a quorum, formalises agenda-setting, determines who chairs the Politburo and the Secretariat, and sets out other aspects.

The Regulations codify Xi Jinping's status as the "core leader" of the CCP Central Committee. Xinhua News Agency reported that Xi's status was "an inevitable requirement for strongly safeguarding the authority and centralized leadership of the Central Committee" and represented a "great and far-reaching significance in advancing socialism with Chinese characteristics in the new era". According to the Regulations, all members of the Politburo and Central Committee would report annually on their efforts to "earnestly implement democratic centralist principles and procedures".

== See also ==
- General secretaryship of Xi Jinping
- Xi Jinping Thought
