= Wei Liqun =

Chinese politician

Wei Liqun (simplified Chinese: 魏礼群; traditional Chinese: 魏禮群; pinyin: Wèi Lǐqún) is a Chinese politician. He is the former director of the State Council Research Office and a former deputy director of the China National School of Administration. He has also been a member of the 16th and 17th Central Committee of the Chinese Communist Party.
