= Wang Bao'an =

Chinese politician

- 王保安

Director of the National Bureau of Statistics
- In office April 2015 – January 26, 2016
- Preceded by: Ma Jiantang
- Succeeded by: Ning Jizhe

Personal details
- Born: December 1963 (age 62) Lushan County, Henan, China
- Party: Chinese Communist Party (expelled)
- Education: Zhongnan University of Economics and Law

Wang Bao'an (Chinese: 王保安; pinyin: Wáng Bǎo'ān; born December 1963) is a former Chinese politician who served as director of the National Bureau of Statistics since April 2015. On January 26, 2016, Wang was placed under investigation by the Central Commission for Discipline Inspection.

== Career ==
Wang Bao'an was born in Lushan County, Henan in December 1963. He became the secretary of the General Office of the Ministry of Finance in 1991 and the secretary of the General Office of the State Administration of Taxation (SAT) in 1994. In 1997, Wang became the vice-director of the General Office of the SAT and became the vice-director of the General Office of the Ministry of Finance in 1998.

In February 2012, he held the post of the vice-Minister of the Ministry of Finance and became the director of the National Bureau of Statistics (NBS) in April 2015.

On January 26, 2016, Wang was placed under investigation by the Central Commission for Discipline Inspection for "serious violations of regulations". He was expelled from the Chinese Communist Party on August 26, 2016. In his disciplinary dossier, the CCDI cited that Wang "did not have an ounce of true political convictions, engaged in superstitious activities for lengthy periods [...], voiced opinions contrary to the spirit of the party center on major issues, resisted investigation; frequented high-end entertainment venues, engaged in money-for-sex and power-for-sex transactions, used his power and influence to extract illicit gains for his relatives [...] and accepted bribes and gifts." Wang was sentenced to life in prison for taking bribes worth 153 million yuan on May 31, 2017.
