= Chen Xian (politician) =

Chinese politician (1919–2018)

Chen Xian (Chinese: 陈先; December 1919 – 1 September 2018) was a Chinese politician who served as Director of the National Bureau of Statistics of China and Deputy Director of the State Planning Commission.

== Biography ==
Chen was born in Ningbo, Zhejiang, China in December 1919. During the Second Sino-Japanese War, he enlisted in the New Fourth Army in 1939, and joined the Chinese Communist Party in September 1940. In 1947 he served as director of the Bureau of Industry and Commerce in Yantai, Shandong Province.

After the founding of the People's Republic of China in 1949, Chen served as vice-president of the Fujian provincial branch of the People's Bank of China and deputy director of the Comprehensive Planning Bureau of the State Planning Commission. He was persecuted at the beginning of the Cultural Revolution, but was rehabilitated and became director of the Comprehensive Planning Bureau in December 1968. He also served as director of the National Bureau of Statistics of China from 1974 to 1981. In 1982 he became deputy director of the State Planning Commission.

Chen was a member of the 12th National Congress of the Chinese Communist Party, and was a member of the Standing Committee of the 7th National People's Congress. He also taught as a part-time professor at Renmin University of China.

Chen retired in August 1995. He died on 1 September 2018 in Beijing, aged 98.
