= Huang Shouhong =

Chinese politician

- 黄守宏
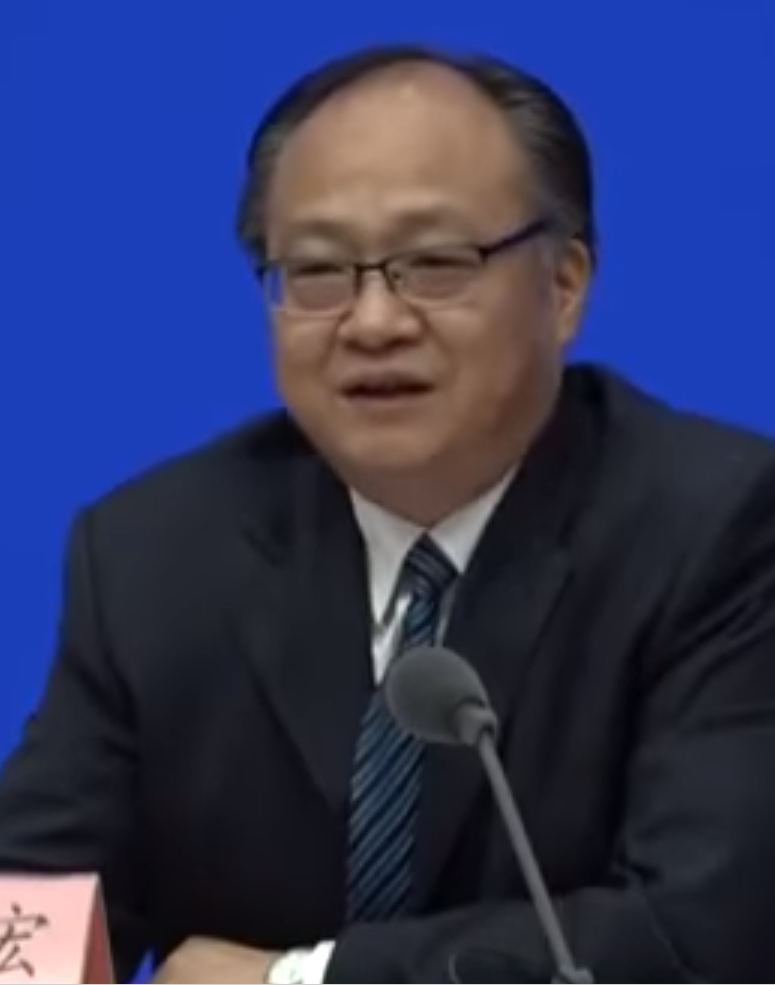
- Huang in May 2020

Director of the State Council Research Office
- In office 6 July 2016 – 27 September 2024
- Premier: Li Keqiang; Li Qiang
- Preceded by: Ning Jizhe
- Succeeded by: Shen Danyang

Personal details
- Born: June 1964 (age 62) Fan County, Henan, China
- Party: Chinese Communist Party
- Education: China Agricultural University; Graduate School of Chinese Academy of Agricultural Sciences

Chinese name
- Simplified Chinese: 黄守宏
- Traditional Chinese: 黃守宏
Transcriptions
Standard Mandarin
- Hanyu Pinyin: Huáng Shǒuhóng

Huang Shouhong (Chinese: 黄守宏; born June 1964) is a Chinese politician who is currently the Chinese Communist Party Committee Secretary and first vice president of the Central Institute of Socialism.

He is a representative of the 19th National Congress of the Chinese Communist Party and a member of the 19th Central Committee of the Chinese Communist Party. He previously was the director of the State Council Research Office, from July 2016 to September 2024.

== Biography ==
Huang was born in Fan County, Henan, in June 1964. He graduated from Beijing Agricultural University (now China Agricultural University) and the Graduate School of Chinese Academy of Agricultural Sciences.

He was appointed as an official in the State Council Research Office in 1993 and over a period of 23 years worked his way up to the position of director in 2016. On 27 September 2024, he was succeeded by Shen Danyang. Huang became the Chinese Communist Party Committee Secretary and first vice president of the Central Institute of Socialism.

Government offices
Preceded by Ning Jizhe	Director of the State Council Research Office; 2016–2024	Succeeded by Shen Danyang
