= Democratic centralism =

Overarching political power principle of communist states

Democratic centralism is a Leninist principle which combines open, internal debate on policies with strict and uniform adherence once debated and adopted. It is adopted by communist states and their governing communist parties. It has also been adopted as the organizational principle of other communist parties, "transmission belt" organizations, and other units operating within communist state systems, as well as by some non-communist organizations.

As a system, democratic centralism is associated with a unified, pyramid-like structure of organs, with a supreme organ at the apex and lower-level organs beneath it. Democratic centralism practices both vertical and horizontal accountability, and calls this dual subordination. Vertically, organs are accountable to their electors and are expected to report to and be supervised by higher-level organs. Decisions adopted at higher levels are binding on subordinate organs and members. Horizontal accountability entails that organs are accountable to the leading organ at their corresponding level. Democratic centralist systems typically rely on collective leadership, institutionalized cadre systems, and regulated consultation to formulate policy, while regulatory enforcement mechanisms, such as party-control organs, are tasked with safeguarding rules, party discipline, organizational unity, compliance with adopted decisions, and combatting corruption.

Democratic centralism is applied across multiple domains of governance, including party organization, state administration, mass organizations, and economic management. In communist states, the enactment of the leading role of the party principle confers on the communist party leadership in coordinating the unified state apparatus through cadre appointments, political guidance, and discipline, while formally locating unified state power in the system of state organs of power headed by the supreme state organ of power. It is also employed in economic planning, where central decisions, such as five-year plans and priority objectives, are formulated by higher organs and implemented downward through administrative and enterprise hierarchies, with lower levels contributing information and proposals within controlled channels. The balance between participation and command, democracy and centralism, has varied across parties, states, and historical periods, and has been a persistent subject of both official interpretation and scholarly critique.

== Foundation ==
=== Historical origins ===
The concept of democratic centralism was conceived by Bolshevik leader Vladimir Lenin. Lenin argued that democratic centralism entailed the "dialectical unity" of democracy (freedom) and centralism (authority). Democratic centralism postulates that decisions must be made through free and open debate (democracy). Once the debate has reached a decision, it is binding on all participants, and everyone, even those opposing it, must implement it uniformly (centralism). It was first adopted as the organizational principle of the Russian Social Democratic Labour Party at the Tampere conference of 1905. The resolution defined the term as follows: "Recognising that the principle of democratic centralism is beyond dispute, the conference regards it as essential to establish a broad electoral principle whilst allowing the elected central organs full power in ideological and practical leadership, together with their revocability and with the widest publicity and strictest accountability of their actions." However, the concept was never considered to be exclusive to the party alone. In 1913, Lenin called for implementing it in the state as well, "democratic centralism not only does not exclude local self-government, with autonomy of regions which are distinct in terms of special economic conditions and way of life, of a particular national make-up of the population, and so on, on the contrary, it insistently demands both the one and the other." The 10th Congress of the Russian Communist Party (Bolsheviks), held on 8–16 March 1921, reaffirmed democratic centralism by banning all factions within the Party. While the ban on faction was adopted as a temporary measure, it became a formal rule that, in some cases, outlawed the very notion of an opposition within party ranks.

The 2nd World Congress of the Communist International (Comintern), an organization tasked with leading the international communist movement, in 1920, adopted the document, "Conditions of Admission to the Communist International". It stated that parties had to adopt democratic centralism as their organizational principle to be admitted into the Comintern: "Parties belonging to the Communist International must be structured according to the principle of democratic centralism. In the present epoch of sharpened civil war, a communist party can carry out its duty only if it is organised in the most centralised way, if iron discipline bordering on military discipline reigns in it, and if its party centre is a powerful, authoritative organ with the widest competences, and enjoys the general trust of the party." The emphasis was on the centralism in democratic centralism, with the Comintern stating it meant "iron discipline, bordering on military discipline". However, the same congress also defined "the main principle of democratic centralism" as "the higher cell being elected by the lower cell, the absolute binding force of all directions of a higher cell for a cell subordinate to it, and the existence of a commanding party centre undisputed for all leaders in party life."

=== Theoretical conception ===
The terms democracy and centralism in democratic centralism have a dialectical relationship in Marxist−Leninist thinking. Lenin originally conceived democratic centralism as the "universal and full freedom to criticise, so long as this does not disturb the unity of a definite action; it rules out all criticism which disrupts or makes difficult the unity of an action decided on by the Party." He also believed democratic centralism established guarantees for the rights of all minorities and loyal opposition factions within the Party. He argued that democratic centralism granted autonomy to every lower-level organ from higher organs. It also codified that all positions within the party were electable, accountable to the Party membership, and subject to recall. Such a system, proponents believe, will safeguard against party splits and ideological conflict while ensuring that intra-party conflicts can be resolved consistently with strict organizational unity.

Soviet scholars Nikolay Moiseenko and Mikhail Popov defined democracy, in its application to enterprise management, as "the all-round development of the initiative of the workers, their involvement in the administration of the state". However, they stressed that this democracy could only function within the institutional bounds of socialist property and a planned economy. Viktor Afanasyev, a long-standing member of the Central Committee of the Communist Party of the Soviet Union and an editor-in-chief of Pravda, noted that the relationship between democracy and centralism changed in accordance with the situation and institution it was practiced in. For example, centralism is far greater than democracy in the Soviet armed forces, but in the administration of economic enterprises, more democracy is necessary. Western scholars and commentators commonly contend, according to historian Michael Waller, that centralism had predominated over democracy in the application of democratic centralism in communist states and in their ruling communist parties.

Democracy and freedom, according to Mao Zedong, are relative, rather than absolute, concepts, whose existence and development are fundamentally conditioned by specific historical circumstances. Democracy operates as a correlate to centralism, and freedom is correlative with discipline. These pairings represent dialectical opposites within a singular entity; they are simultaneously contradictory and united. Mao thus argued that neither element should be unilaterally emphasized to the exclusion of its counterpart. From a communist perspective, both freedom and discipline, as well as democracy and centralism, are considered essential for successful governance. The cohesive unity of these pairs—democracy with centralism, and freedom with discipline—constitutes the principle of democratic centralism.

Chinese political scientist Wang Guixiu contends that centralism in democratic centralism refers to the state apparatus, and that democracy in this sense serves to define and legitimize the state in question. This means that centralism represents a correct amount of centralization of state power; it must be qualified by democracy to be genuinely democratic centralism. Without democracy, Wang argues, centralization is nothing more than dictatorship. The essence of democratic centralism, from this perspective, is the fundamental focus on creating a centralized system based on democracy. Scholar Yang Guangbin summarizes this to mean that "democratic centralism is centralism in democracy, not centralism outside democracy. That is to say, the vitality of democratic centralism comes from democracy."

== Systemic features ==
=== Unified system of organs ===
Democratic centralism entails establishing a pyramid-like structure with a single supreme organ at the top and lower-level organs beneath it. This structure must be organized on unified (unitary) lines for democratic centralism to be practiced properly, and this applies to all entities, whether the communist party, the communist state, transmission belt organizations, or any other unit that practices democratic centralism. The unified power structure informs on the actual structure of the given entity, and the relationship between the organs. Democratic centralism turns the highest organs into superior organs and creates a system in which policies adopted by higher-level organs must be implemented downward by lower-level units. Popular sovereignty in democratic centralism means that the powers of the leaders of the state, party, and other entities come from the people or the members of the organization in question. The unified structure is the tool to translate this sovereignty undiluted vertically from bottom to top. Democratic centralism also informs on the power relationship in this structure, and the superiority of decisions made by superior organs.

The pyramid structure ensures a unified vertical chain of command from the bottom to the top, and from the top to the bottom. Horizontal contact between organs of the unified pyramid structure can occur, but is rare. While initiatives, feedback, and proposals can move from bottom to top, this seldom occurs in these structures. Instead, the centralization of power in a central organ is often legitimized at the expense of lower-level organs. However, to ensure sound central decision-making, these structures try to move information vertically. Each level of the pyramid is headed by a collective leadership headed by a single leader.

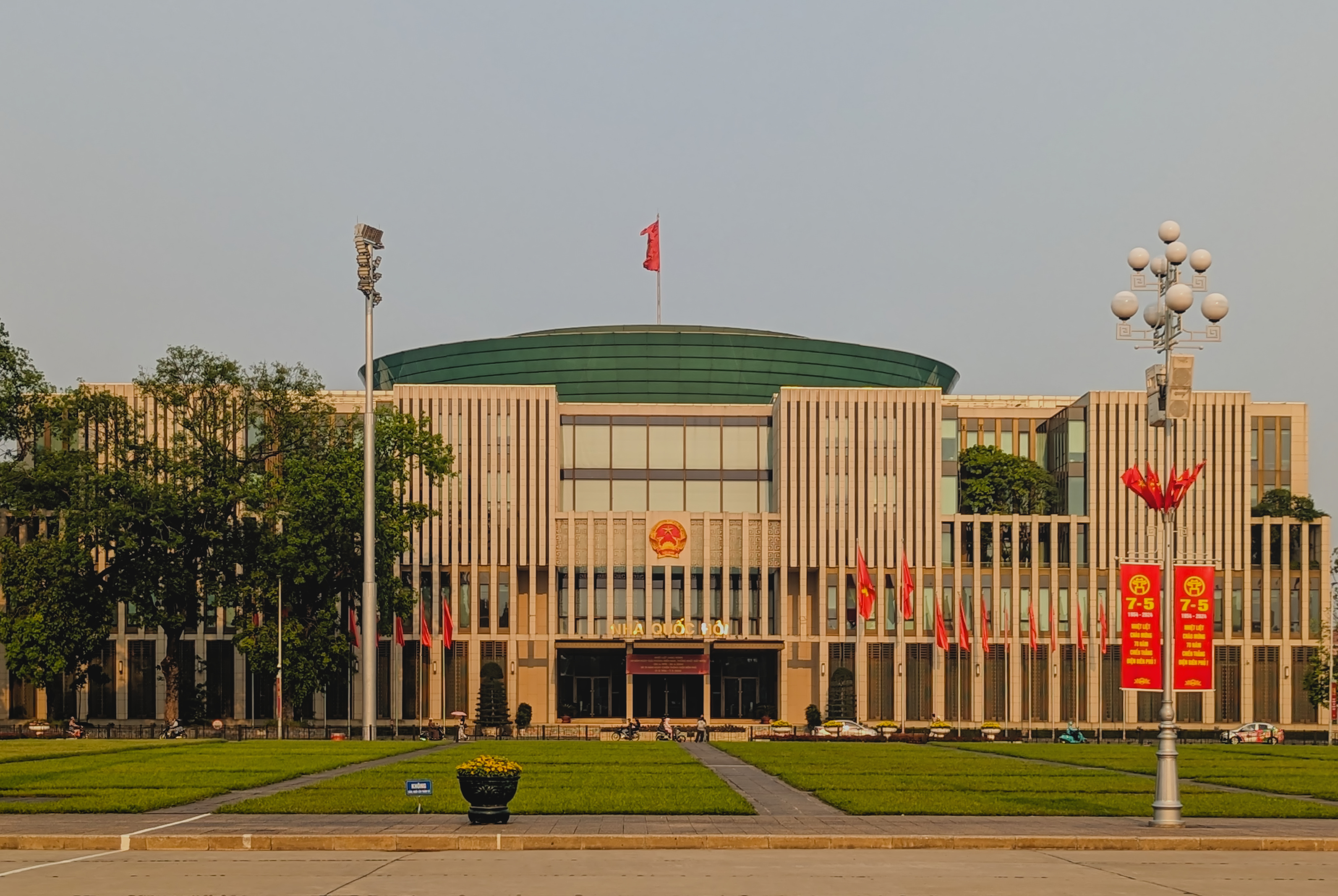
In the state, the unified system of state organs is headed by the supreme state organ of power. Depicted in this picture is the National Assembly Building of Vietnam, which is the seat of Vietnam's supreme state organ of power, the National Assembly of Vietnam.

In the state, democratic centralism relies on the unified power of the supreme state organ of power (SSOP), which heads the unified state apparatus. The SSOP establishes inferior state organs and decides the division of labour between them, which is formalised in the communist state constitution. This system has its origins in the October Revolution, which established the world's first SSOP and, by extension, the world's first communist state, in the form of the All-Russian Congress of Soviets of the Russian Soviet Federative Socialist Republic (Russian SFSR). One of the first decrees instituted by the new communist state, titled "All Power to the Soviets", on 8 November 1917, conferred all state powers on the SSOP. Furthermore, since the SSOP held the unified powers of the state, it could only delegate its state powers to other state organs. Meaning that the powers held by the supreme executive and administrative organ or lower-level state organs of power are bequeathed to them by the SSOP.

The Soviet system was transmitted to the rest of the communist world. For example, when China adopted its 1954 constitution, Vice Chairman Liu Shaoqi told the 1st Session of the 1st National People's Congress, "We have centralized [state power] and unified the People's Congress thus demonstrating our democratic centralism." This system, he argued, would empower the Chinese people since it both allowed for popular participation in the state structure, while also creating an institutional structure capable of establishing a unity of political will. The 1954 Chinese constitution also proclaimed in its second article that the SSOP, lower-level state organs of power, and state organs subordinate to the state organs of power must implement democratic centralism. This article stressed vertical accountability, requiring lower-level state organs of power to report to and be supervised by higher ones.

By having superior and inferior organs, the communist state system of unified power actively constitutes a distinct model of political organization, contrasting with the liberal democratic principles of separation of powers of presidential systems and the fusion of power of parliamentary systems. It institutes a system of vertical and horizontal accountability called dual subordination, meaning that organs are accountable to their electors and to the organ next in line in the hierarchy above. It also entails that inferior organs are accountable to the leading organ at the corresponding level of governance. According to the state constitution, all organs that are created and accountable to the state organs of power, such as the executive and administrative organ, the judicial organ, and the procuratorial organ, are deemed inferior. The present-day constitution of China further clarifies democratic centralism by stipulating that the unified power of the SSOP and the lower-level state organs of power, and how inferior state organs of power are created, supervised, and accountable to them. It also clarified that local executive organs are accountable to higher ones, but has also codified a level of inbuilt autonomy: "of giving full play to local initiatives and enthusiasm under the unified leadership" of central organs. These stipulations are not uncommon in communist state law, and some states went further. The 1977 Soviet constitution defined state democratic centralism as follows:

1. All state officials can be recalled;
2. All lower-level state organs of power are subordinate to and must report to higher state organs of power;
3. All inferior organs are subordinate to the relevant state organ of power;
4. All decisions made by higher state organs of power were binding on the lower ones;
5. All decisions of the SSOP as the apex state organ of power, meaning it is the highest organ of the state, are binding on the state as a whole.

Marxism–Leninism was originally opposed to federalism in any form. Lenin argued that federalism and decentralisation hindered the development of capitalism since it required the utmost centralisation of the state as humanly possible. Since he believed it was in the self-interest of the proletariat to abolish capitalism, he also believed they actively sought to strengthen centralisation within the state. As such, Lenin considered centralisation a milestone in historical progress that moved society from the state formation conceived in the Middle Ages and accelerated the route to a socialist future. And the only way to reach socialism, Lenin believed, was through a centralised state structure. Critically, democratic centralism needed to ensure the maximisation of centralism. However, if federalism were ever to be adopted, Lenin reasoned that it could only be a means for the full realisation of democratic centralism. Despite Lenin's objection, the Russian SFSR and later the Soviet Union were established as federal states. The federal communist states were federations in which the federal organs could make binding decisions on their federalised subjects, and had extensive control over their territories. For example, the 1977 Soviet constitution stated that the Soviet Union was a socialist federal republic with a unified system of state organs of power that formulated and adopted policies grounded in the unity of the Soviet people.

The Yugoslav reconceptualisation of democratic centralism in their 1974 Yugoslav constitution reduced the scope of democratic centralism at the federal level to specific areas: the overall strategy for developing socialism, the development of the system of social relations, the protection of the communist state system, and national security. However, this democratic centralism, unlike in other communist states, would not be based on majority decision-making. Instead, the republics and the autonomous provinces were treated as equal subjects, and to practice the Yugoslav policy of equality between nations and nationalities, one had to gain consensus through negotiations. In other areas, the state replaced democratic centralism with the socialist self-management principles of self-management agreements, the principle of social negotiations in a society that defends the pluralism of self-managing interests, and the principle of income. Self-management agreements were considered free agreements between equal subjects. These agreements were reached through negotiations among different interests among working people and self-managing interests that directly confronted one another. The principle of income delineated the right to the results of labour and its distribution.

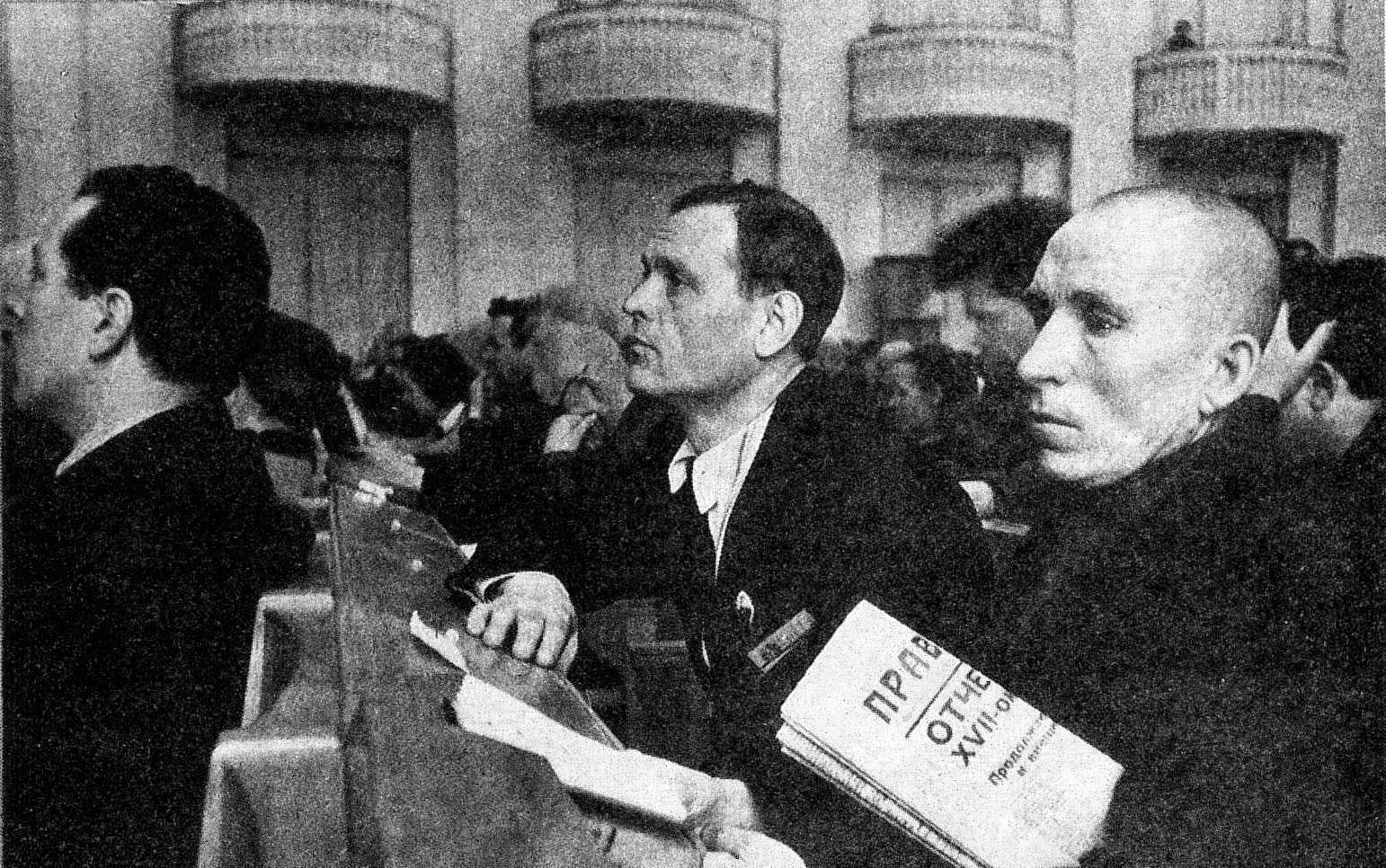
In the party, the unified system of state organs is headed by the party congress. Depicted in this picture are delegates to the 17th Congress of the All-Union Communist Party (Bolsheviks), held in 1934.

The communist party is structured similarly, and its leading organs are the party congress and the central committee it elects. Depending on statutory design, the congress is also empowered to elect a control commission, as in the case of Chinese Communist Party, an auditing commission, as was the case in the Communist Party of the Soviet Union, a statutory organ, as was the case in the League of Communists of Yugoslavia, and the party leader, as is presently the case in the Workers' Party of Korea. The congress commonly convenes only once every fifth year, and the Central Committee leads the party when it's not in session. The Central Committee is organised into two lines: the political line, represented by the plenary session of the Central Committee, and the executive line is represented by the apparatus (the internal bureaucracy) and is responsible for implementing the decisions of the party congress, the Central Committee's political line, and the central leading organs. Since the Central Committee's political line convenes infrequently for plenary sessions; in China, it typically meets no more than once a year. Therefore, at its first plenary session of a new electoral term, the Central Committee elects its central leading organs (for example, the Politburo and Secretariat but also other organs if deemed necessary) and the general secretary, the party leader. This system is mirrored at lower levels. The relationship between these organs is regulated by how democratic centralism is defined in the party statute. Most definitions of democratic centralism have been heavily influenced by the definition adopted by the 17th Congress of the All-Union Communist Party (Bolsheviks) in 1934. The Soviet party definition, which remained unchanged for most of its existence, stated:

1. All organs, from the lowest to the highest level, are electable;
2. All organs report and are accountable by their respective party organisation;
3. All members are required to work under party discipline and abide by majority decisions;
4. All decisions made by the highest organs are binding on lower-level organs and members.

The party creates primary party organisations and party member groups within existing organisations, such as factories, schools, military units, and transmission belt organisations. In these cases, the activities of the party organisation only relate to the institution in which it is organised. Its members are drawn from that institution and only relate to that party organisation. The party organisation engages in intra-organisational communication, but it communicates only with party organisations at higher levels. It does not communicate horizontally with other party organisations at the same level, as that would breach democratic centralism. In larger primary party organisations, it will be divided into sub-units. These sub-units are also not commonly allowed to communicate horizontally with other units of the same organisation. These units elect delegates to delegate meetings that, in turn, elect a committee that runs the organisation.

Transmission belt mass organisations are also organised on the basis of democratic centralism. These organisations are tied directly to the party and state, but also create a unified pyramid structure on democratic centralist lines. For example, the charter of the Lao Federation of Trade Unions states, "lower levels must follow the higher levels. Every level of the LFTU must follow and execute according to the rules and regulations of the Central Committee level [...] each level must report to and be responsible to its own level, towards higher levels and its constituents".

=== Cadre system ===
Democratic centralism relies on a hierarchical cadre system, in which officials are selected, appointed, and rotated through organizational posts across the party, state, transmission-belt organizations, enterprises, and other units. This system has been referred to as the nomenklatura system, literally Russian for "list of names system". Meaning that the CPSU Central Committee, through its Secretariat, oversaw personnel planning, elections, dismissals, appointments, and transfers. Party committees at each level of governance were expected to maintain a list of key offices directly supervised by them. While formally the plenary session of the Central Committee decided on all personnel matters in regard to leading party and state offices, it was the Secretariat that drew up a list of names and the Politburo that approved it. It was then sent to the Central Committee plenary for ratification.

The scope and intensity of party control over cadres, cadre rotation, evaluation, and supervision varied significantly across communist states and historical periods. In China, however, the Chinese Communist Party (CCP) Central Committee is formally responsible for managing cadres. The primary institutional instrument for cadre management is the Organization Department, a bureaucratic organ headed by a member of the Central Committee and supervised by the Secretariat. Each level of party governance maintains its own organization department. With regard to the unified state apparatus, the CCP is empowered to recommend the election, appointment, dismissal, and removal of officials to the National People's Congress, to inferior state organs, and to the relevant transmission belt organizations, in accordance with party rules and state law.

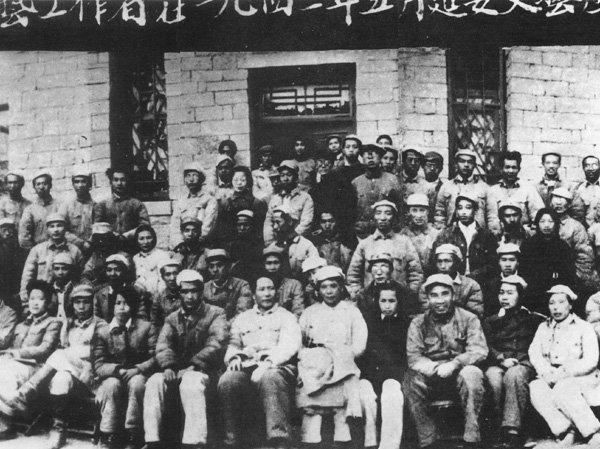
Mao taking a group photo with party cadres in 1942

Within the CCP, the democratic centralist cadre process involves careful observation and evaluation of potential appointees by the Organisation Department, which then submits its findings to the Party committee for discussion and decision-making. Decisions are made collectively, with a focus on broad participation, usually requiring at least two-thirds of the committee to be present. Once the Party committee approves the appointment, it is further reviewed by higher-level committees, which may seek additional opinions, before the final appointment is formally made in compliance with legal procedures. Since the early 2000s, the CCP has reformed its cadre system by formalising collective decision-making, evaluation, and consultation procedures while reaffirming the Party's centralized control over personnel. Party congress reports frame these reforms as expanding socialist democracy through merit-based selection, supervision, and participation under unified Party leadership.

In line with these developments, the CCP has progressively restructured its cadre system. Key milestones included the adoption of comprehensive party regulations, the Civil Servant Law, and sector-specific rules governing appointment, discipline, rotation, and evaluation across party and state institutions. These reforms have sought to expand merit-based selection, collective deliberation, public consultation, and oversight mechanisms while reinforcing party control through discipline and political responsibility. The system has been extended to state-owned enterprises and public institutions, integrating competition, performance assessment, and professionalisation into cadre management. Together, these measures aimed to legalise, standardise, and institutionalise cadre governance while preserving the Party's leading role in personnel management.

Generalised across all communist states, the cadre system has instituted democratic centralist procedures for the appointment and removal from office of both elective and non-elective offices, based on the unified vertical chain of command. That means that each party committee's cadre decision at the corresponding level must be approved by the committee next in the vertical line. That committee is called the superior committee. Non-elective offices encompass all non-electable party posts, as well as elective positions in the state, transmission belt organisations, and other units that are subject to party nomination and approval. Regarding non-elective offices, the superior party committee is empowered to approve or veto any appointment, promotion, post rotation, or removal from office made by the committee vertically underneath it. The most common procedure is for the superior party committee to receive a written proposal from the inferior party committee regarding a specific cadre change. It sets out the ramifications of the proposal and explains why it is sought. To make the process more objective, the written proposal is handed in alongside material on the candidate. These materials can be biographic information or, for example, include gathered evidence of public opinion on the cadre in question. The superior party committee can amend the proposal as it sees fit, adopt it as is, or reject it entirely. The superior party committee follows the same process if it regards personnel change in state organs. However, the same process is mimicked within the state organs and takes effect only when the superior state organs have adopted the changes. Regarding the state, the party can initiate cadre changes, but cannot formally change state personnel without approval from the relevant state organs.

The democratic centralist procedure regarding elective party posts shares many similarities with the non-elective one. Before election day, the party organ in question formulates a list of candidates and submits it to the superior party committee, along with a written proposal. The superior party committee then instigates a political investigation of the proposed candidates before putting them up for election. The candidates that are approved are then proposed in a unified list, and the election result is reported back to the superior party committee, which then formally ends the process by approving them. However, cadre tenure is governed by party rules rather than fixed constitutional terms, allowing superior committees to remove or reassign officials between elections. The superior committees are empowered to rotate cadres between offices, and such decisions are transmitted downward for implementation often without much controversy. While the inferior party committee cannot bypass its superior committee, the superior party committee cannot bypass the inferior either, since its organization department usually holds the personnel files needed to make a cadre decision legitimately.

=== Collective leadership and individual responsibility ===
Collective leadership is a core democratic centralist principle. It is commonly codified in the statute of the communist party and the communist state constitution, as is the case in China at present. It entails that collective organs, such as the Central Committee or the Politburo, have to make decisions in a democratic manner. It expressly forbids any leader of a collective to make arbitrary decisions "or place himself or herself above his or her Party organisation", meaning the other members of the collective. That is, collective leadership is commonly defined as a productive balance between collective decision-making and individual responsibility. For example, Ho Chi Minh, the founder of the Communist Party of Vietnam (CPV), defined it as a democratic system where "individual responsibility is centralised. Collective leadership and individual responsibility, combined, make up democratic centralism." Meaning that if collective leadership, that is, democracy, is absent, the decision-making process would be monopolized in one person's hand, producing autocracy. In the opposite case, where no one takes individual responsibility, the decision-making process would devolve into chaos, destroying functioning governance, according to Ho.

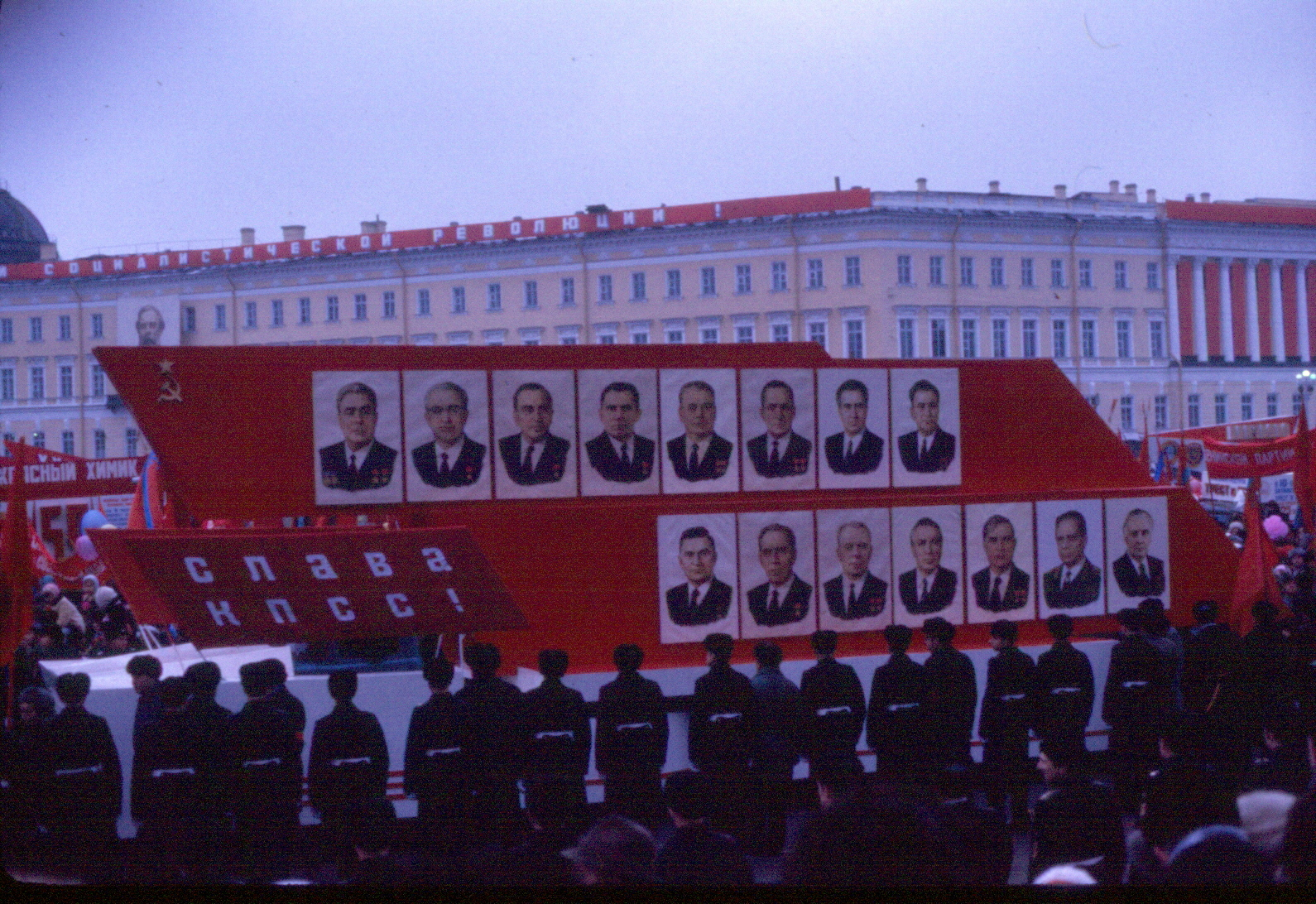
Democratic centralist organizations are headed by collective organs. A picture taken from the 1976 anniversary of the October Revolution, and shows the members and candidates of the Politburo of the 25th CPSU Congress.

The degree of institutionalization of collective decision-making in communist states has varied, but generally been low. For example, the Soviet party did not institutionalize who would chair the CPSU Politburo and the CPSU Secretariat until the 28th Congress of CPSU, held in 1990. The office of second-in-command, informally called second secretary, was also not formalized until 1990. The CPSU Politburo never adopted a rules of procedure except for four rules Vladimir Lenin dictated by phone in December 1922. These rules had no stipulation on meeting minutes, quorum, meeting agenda, the rights of members of collective organs, attendance by non-members, establishment of internal commissions, or how decisions were to be made. In the CPSU, the majority of Politburo decisions were made outside meetings. In contrast, the League of Communists of Yugoslavia (LCY) institutionalized the work of its politburo, the LCY Presidency, from 1969 onwards. The LCY rules made clear that all decisions of the LCY Presidency had to be adopted by meetings, instituted a quorum, clear rules on meeting agenda and minutes, and expressly codified the rights of members. The Chinese Communist Party has also sought to institutionalize the leading party collectives, having adopted the "Regulations on Work of the Central Committee of the Chinese Communist Party" in 2020. It establishes a quorum, formalises agenda-setting, determines who chairs the Politburo and the Secretariat, and sets out other aspects.

Since collective leadership is often treated, as Ho outlined, as synonymous with democracy, or at the very least, as a necessary component of democracy, it should be highlighted that several communist state leaders have noted how democracy has been reduced to a mere formality by the overt centralization of power in one individual. This criticism was shared by Deng Xiaoping, China's paramount leader, in 1980. He defined the over-concentration of power in the party committees as an indiscriminate and illegitimate centralization of power, legitimized by strengthening CCP leadership. Deng also believed that the centralization of power within the committee structure often led to the leader monopolizing power, particularly the first secretaries of party committees, who then unilaterally directed and decided on all matters. In this manner, the intended centralized leadership of the party is corrupted and transformed into leadership by individuals.

In 2004, Tô Huy Rứa, who would go on to become a member of the Politburo of the Communist Party of Vietnam (CPV) two years later, echoed Deng's criticism. He argued that the integrity of collective leadership rested upon the intellectual capacity and moral bravery of officials. He believed that the failure to implement democracy was driven by impure motives of personal gain, which often reduced it to a formality. By negating democracy, these officials also transformed centralism into a one-man dictatorship. To create a proper balance between the two, Tô Huy Rứa contended that democratic centralism required regulatory enforcement, instituting high ethical standards for officials to protect democracy from the excesses of centralism and institute proper collective leadership. Both Deng's and Tô Huy Rứa's criticism highlight the importance of cadres, and the leader specifically, in safeguarding collective leadership and democratic centralist norms. Tô Huy Rứa believed the best solution to this problem was educating the collective's leader in necessary democratic and cultural attitudes to foster an atmosphere conducive to collective leadership.

Nhị Lê, a one-time deputy editor-in-chief of the CPV's theoretical magazine Communist, in a draft proposal to the 14th Party Congress, argued that the control of power was paramount to collective leadership and needed to be the existential focus of the party and the state. To control power, he believed, a constant effort was needed to maintain a dynamic equilibrium between democracy and centralism. He noted two common failures in the implementation of democratic centralism. Firstly, the abuse of centralization by establishing "false unity" and sycophantic "collective consensus", leading to non-genuine compliance. Secondly, the distortion of democracy occurs when a democracy is practiced that prevents genuine political critique. The solution is not to discard democratic centralism, Nhị Lê maintains, but to create good procedures that clearly delegate power and define responsibility for both the individual members of the collective and the collective as a whole. In his mind, the ultimate objective is to create a system that maximizes the expansion of democracy and internal critique while achieving the highest possible centralization in decision-making collectives.

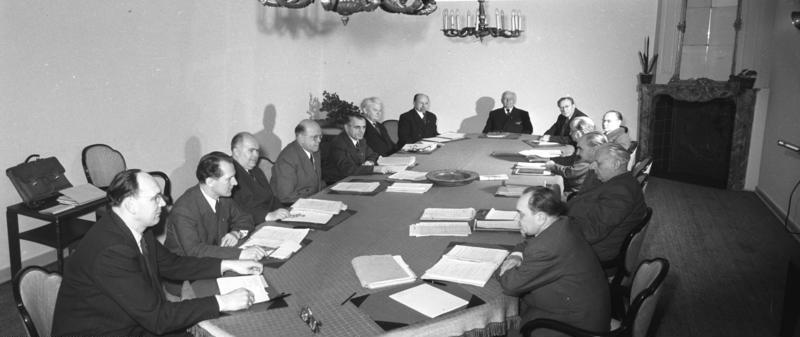
The politburo of the Socialist Unity Party of Germany, the ruling party of East Germany, is an example of a collective organ that practiced collective leadership.

In line with these criticisms, communist parties have sought to create systems that enforce collective leadership. For example, the CPV has established rules and procedures to enforce democratic centralism. Party committees at all levels of governance are required to implement a collective leadership system that promotes the initiative, creativity, and responsibility of individuals, particularly the leader's, thereby satisfying individual responsibility. This has involved creating a system and culture that ensures every committee member is fully involved in discussions and decision-making to support collective leadership, while clearly defining the specific tasks, powers, and responsibilities of each person. However, the party stresses that the development and expansion of democracy must always be balanced with the strengthening of the party's unified centralized leadership and strict maintenance of party discipline. This dual emphasis helps to ensure that phenomena such as localism, indiscipline, and freedomism, as well as bureaucratic centralization, proceduralism, patriarchy, arbitrariness, contempt for the collective, and disdain for subordinates are consistently opposed.

The focus on democracy has also shifted attention towards accountability. For example, the Vietnamese communist party has undertaken significant reforms since the 9th National Congress, held in 2001, to strengthen accountability and transparency. This has been achieved by expanding and formalizing the practice of interpellation across the entire governance system. Mandatory mechanisms now require key officials, including those in the Politburo and Secretariat, to report on their activities and submit to questioning by Central Committee members. This institutionalized scrutiny is intended to enhance the responsibility and leadership capacity of decision-making organs while serving as a proactive mechanism to prevent disciplinary violations and safeguard the ethical conduct of cadres.

The CPV procedurally reinforces these accountability measures by issuing model working regulations for all provincial and city-level party committees. These regulations delineate the powers and responsibilities of the collective committees versus those of the individual leader, namely, the party secretary. The aim is to ensure a proper balance between collective leadership and individual responsibility, making it harder for officials to shirk accountability by hiding behind collective decisions or, conversely, for leaders to abuse power outside of defined procedural limits unilaterally. Despite these accomplishments, from January 2016 to August 2020, violations of democratic centralism accounted for 60.5% of all disciplinary violations in the party, according to the CPV's Central Inspection Commission. This indicates that breaches to collective leadership remain the single largest category of violations in the CPV. The CPV does not share this problem alone, and since 1996, the CCP has repeatedly stressed and punished breaches to democratic centralism in the form of failures in collective leadership.

=== Enforcement mechanisms ===
Regulatory enforcement is a democratic centralist principle across all organizations, whether the state, the party, or transmission belts. Democratic centralist enforcement mechanisms operate primarily in a vertical and downward direction. No organ exercises supervisory power over a supreme decision-making organ, such as the supreme state organ of power or, in the party, the party congress and Central Committee, which are treated as embodiments of the collective will and therefore not subject to political restraint other than through rules adopted by themselves. Enforcement organs may investigate and discipline individual officials within all organs, but they do not supervise the collective organs themselves, such as the SSOP or the Central Committee. Constitutional and regulatory compliance is instead ensured through inferior organs established by and accountable to the supreme organs of the entity in question, reflecting the Marxist–Leninist rejection of judicial review and the conception of regulatory enforcement as an inherently political function exercised by political organs.

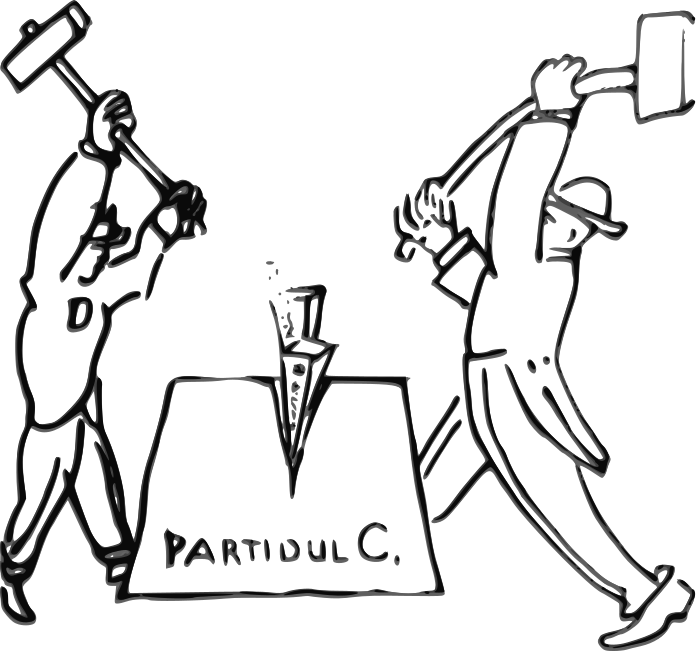
Anti-factionalist cartoon by the exiled section of the Romanian Communist Party, December 1931

Within the party, the enforcement of the party rules, communist morality, auditing and anti-corruption is commonly the responsibility of the control organ, but certain ruling parties have also established auditing organs and the LCY created a statutory organ. This organ is either elected by the party congress or immediately after it by a plenary session of the Central Committee. Afterwards, at their own session, the control organ elects its leadership, most commonly by secret ballot. In cases where it is elected by congress, it is one of two party organs, the other being the Central Committee, that reports its work to it. Its report often details how many members have faced disciplinary punishments since the last congress, while also informing the party as a whole about the number of party complaints and the issues it is facing in its work. Similar reports can also be published mid-term, usually in relation to one of their sessions. Sometimes officials from the control commission publish articles on their work. For example, Janos Brutyo, the head of the Central Control Commission of the Hungarian Socialist Workers' Party, wrote an article in 1978 that reported breaches of collective leadership. He highlighted the problem the party had with "leaders who overrate [...] their authority and jurisdiction ...] leaders who pay little or no heed to party resolutions and government decrees [...] leaders who abuse authority by punishing those who criticise, and so forth."

These organs are responsible for enforcing party discipline, cases of factionalism, safeguarding the party's regulatory framework, monitoring the implementation of the resolutions of the congress and central committee, investigating disciplinary matters involving party members, evaluating party members' qualifications, hearing appeals against decisions by lower-level organs, auditing economic and financial activities, and safeguarding ideological and organizational unity. In Marxist–Leninist theory and practice, party discipline extends beyond violations of state law or policy decisions to encompass behavior deemed incompatible with the ethical, political, and organizational standards expected of a communist. This includes misrepresentation of personal or political biography, conduct that undermines the party's authority and credibility, and breaches of communist morality and lifestyle, and organizational norms. Party discipline also serves to create and maintain unity of ideological and organizational will by combating factionalism, ideological laxity, and other tendencies perceived as weakening party cohesion. Disciplinary measures may therefore be imposed both for breaches of state law and party regulations, as well as for conduct judged to violate communist moral standards and the obligations of party membership.

In the communist state apparatus, enforcement has traditionally been delegated to two organs. The judicial organs headed by the supreme judicial organ of communist states are, more correctly, adjudicatory organs that resolve disputes presented to them. The procuratorial organs headed by the supreme procuratorial organ were in charge of supervising all breaches of legality and wrongdoings in the state apparatus. In the existing communist states, this has been divided into three organs. In China, the judicial system is headed by the Supreme People's Court, the procuratorial system by the Supreme People's Procuratorate, and the supervisory system of the National Supervisory Commission, while in Cuba this system troika is headed by the Supreme People's Court, the Attorney General and the Comptroller General.

In the traditional model, mostly practiced in communist Europe, the procuracy leads enforcement work and is institutionally more powerful than the courts. The procuracy's institutional remit in the traditional model was largely identical across all communist states, though there were minor differences in emphasis. Their main responsibility could be summarized as supervising the work of government ministries, other inferior state organs, transmission belt mass organizations, state officials, and citizens to protect citizens' lawful rights and the communist state order. These organs are political in intent. As Jaroslav Krupauer, the Procurator General of the Czechoslovak Socialist Republic, surmised: "We [the procuratorate] are conducting a struggle against everything that hampers a more successful progress toward an advanced socialist society." Lucjan Czubiński, the Procurator General of the Polish People's Republic, concurred, stating the procuratorate was conducting its work in accordance with the wishes of the communist state, communist party, and the general wishes of society. He also emphasised that the procuratorate's remit was boundless: "There is no sector in which the prosecutor general would not have to be active."

=== Corrective mechanisms ===
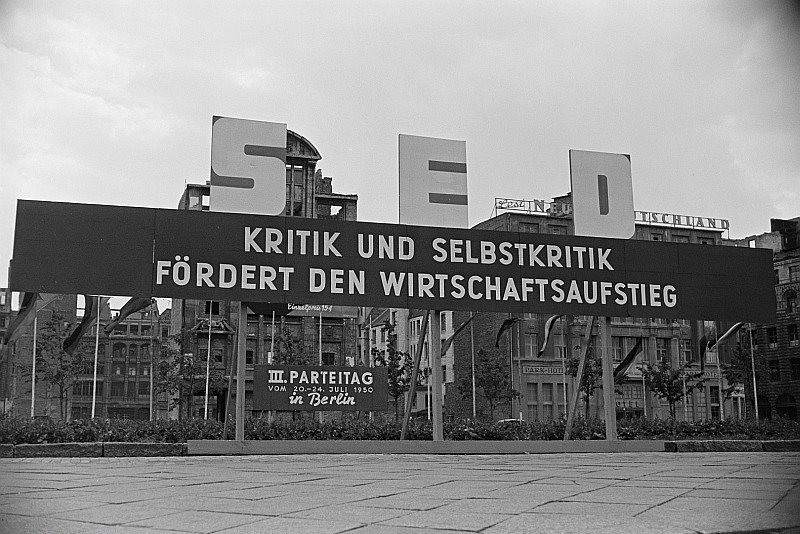
An East German party banner promoting criticism and self-criticism. The banner reads, "Criticism and self-criticism demand economic progress.

Criticism and self-criticism is a core democratic centralist principle, often formalised in party rules or state law, and functions as a corrective mechanism that seeks to ensure political accountability, discipline, and organisational supervision within communist parties and states. It originated from the socialist movement and was promoted by German socialist Rosa Luxemburg and, most prominently, by Vladimir Lenin. It was championed after the October Revolution by Lenin and his supporters as a useful tool to battle-harden communist forces, enabling them to implement communism successfully. Joseph Stalin stressed this principle even further, stating that it was an indispensable tool for constructing communism and that "self-criticism is as necessary to us as air or water".

Gaston Monmousseau, a prominent figure within the French Communist movement, posited that the practice of conscious criticism and self-criticism of individual behavior and political activities constitutes a vital instrument for the transformation of a bourgeois consciousness into a revolutionary consciousness. Mao Zedong reasoned that good communists had to actively criticize all erroneous ideas rather than allow them to spread unchecked. Criticism and self-criticism were therefore presented as essential Marxist–Leninist tools for correcting mistakes, eliminating harmful practices, and preserving what was considered politically and organizationally sound.

This principle was implemented in both ruling and non-ruling communist parties. For example, Elizabeth Bentley recalled that upon joining the Communist Party USA (CPUSA), she was immediately inducted into the criticism and self-criticism process. She recollects that "I was told that each Communist should indulge in Bolshevik self-criticism—that is, he should be able to view his own actions impersonally and decide whether he had behaved rightly or wrongly, and he should be able to admit his mistakes without rationalizing. Moreover, his fellow comrades also sat in judgment on him. If, in their opinion, he had erred, he was publicly criticized at his unit meeting." This reflected the CPUSA's belief that criticism and self-criticism was a useful tool in creating the "new man" who stood above egotistic individualism and prioritized the collective.

Several communist campaigns have had criticism and self-criticism at their center. For example, the Chinese Communist Party's Yan'an Rectification Movement of 1942–45 used this principle to discipline cadres, enforce ideological conformity, and consolidate organizational unity. Several tools were used, such as dividing 20,000 individuals into smaller monitored groups to study Marxist texts, debate, and engage in criticism and self-criticism. The campaign started carefully, with real debate, criticism, and self-criticism, but increasingly became more oppressive with time. Participants could be accused of working for the enemy or acting in bad faith. This movement eventually produced the institution of the democratic life meeting, the name given to a party session devoted to criticism and self-criticism. The democratic life meetings have been institutionalized in formal party regulations, especially under Xi Jinping's general secretaryship. Accepting the criticism of the person's peers can lead to loss of political office, as demonstrated by the resignation of General Secretary Hu Yaobang in January 1987 (often attributed to his failure to handle student protests that was purportedly uncovered by a subsequent criticism and self-criticism session within the leadership).

The Chinese Politburo convenes democratic life meetings annually under the general secretary's leadership. In Chinese media, these meetings are presented as both collegial discussions among peers and processes led by the general secretary. For example, at the Politburo's 2019 democratic life meeting, members were reported as engaging in criticism and self-criticism on the need to "study and understand [...] the important instructive spirit of General Secretary Xi Jinping's latest important speech", and it ended with the members unanimously endorsing the importance of "upholding General Secretary Xi Jinping as the core of the Central Committee and the core position of the entire party". Meaning that Xi was exempted from criticism and from undergoing self-criticism, with the remaining members criticizing themselves and others.

Criticism and self-criticism in China are also used to uncover wrongdoings by officials, that is, as the first step in instigating a formal investigation against an individual or group by the party-control organ. However, party officials stress that this only counts for a minority of cases. According to Wang Qishan, the former secretary of the Central Commission for Discipline Inspection (the control organ of the Chinese party), "The supervision within the Party must take discipline as the first resort, often carry out criticism and self-criticism during democratic life meetings, and often interview problematic individual officials. We must ensure that practices of officials [being] 'red face[d] and sweating' become the norm." In this sense, democratic life meetings became forums in which most cadres can redeem themselves and gain redemption. However, the party has clearly delineated between light disciplinary punishment, heavy disciplinary punishment, and legal punishment. Party members who have been accused of engaging in factionalism against the Central Committee or of vying for political power are generally believed to be non-redeemable. The 2017 party rule, the Regulations on Conducting Democratic Life Meetings for Party Committees above Country Level state, clarifies that democratic life meetings are an important institutional tool to strengthen the processes of "self-purification, self-perfection, self-innovation, and for improving the ability of self-realization, [...] and maintaining the unity and centrality of the Party." In the majority of cases in China, the aim of criticism and self-criticism is "curing the sickness to save the patient", that is, admit your faults and improve yourself.

Other communist states have actively tried to institutionalize criticism and self-criticism in daily life, as North Korea has done since the 1960s. Beginning in the 1970s, criticism and self-criticism sessions were organized weekly in work units of enterprises. These sessions are either organized by the party or one of the transmission belts. Every North Korean is at least a member of one organization. For example, even an unemployed housewife is a member of the Socialist Women's Union of Korea. Individuals are expected to come prepared to the session and inform the gathering of the bad behavior they have engaged in since the last session. For example, a soldier might state that he did not clean his weapon properly. He must also propose a measure of correction. A cell of a unit usually consists of 7–10 people, and these criticism and self-criticism sessions typically last 90 minutes. Over this period, each member is expected to engage in at least 10 minutes of criticism and self-criticism.

Criticism and self-criticism have been institutionalized in several countries, including Vietnam. In the Vietnamese communist party, criticism and self-criticism are mandatory, cyclical (occurring annually and at the end of an electoral term), and centralized. Party regulations on criticism and self-criticism in Vietnam ensure vertical accountability by making decisions and conduct subject to assessment by both subordinate organs, which gather a bottom-up perspective and address grievances, and superior organs, which enforce top-down discipline and correct political direction. The aim is to ensure high political integrity, and the review of an individual cadre's performance focuses heavily on adherence to democratic centralism, ideological integrity, and exemplary ethical standards. It also seeks to hold collective decision-making organs accountable by reviewing their compliance with higher Party directives and the internal integrity of their members, particularly those of their leading organ. In Vietnam, non-Party mass organizations, such as the Vietnamese Fatherland Front, and representatives from the relevant state organ of power also participate in criticism and self-criticism by providing feedback and information to the central party leadership regarding the conduct and performance of local party officials to the party leadership at the corresponding level.

=== Consultation and popular participation ===
Both ruling communist parties and communist states seek to govern through forms of political consultation and popular participation, but within institutionally controlled democratic centralist channels. The guiding idea is that the communist state can only govern effectively if its decisions, to borrow Chinese terminology, serve the people. Democratic centralism also entails that popular inputs must ultimately be centralized within higher decision-making organs, either of the party or of the state, so that these bodies can formulate decisions on the people's behalf, ensuring they align with the party's ideological line. This commitment shapes how communist states interpret and manage public debate. Certain states have codified popular participation in democratic centralist processes into law, as communist Czechoslovakia did: "Central leadership of the society and state according to the principle of democratic centralism is combined with a broad competence and responsibility in the lower organs, with the active participation of the working people and the utilization of their creative initiative."

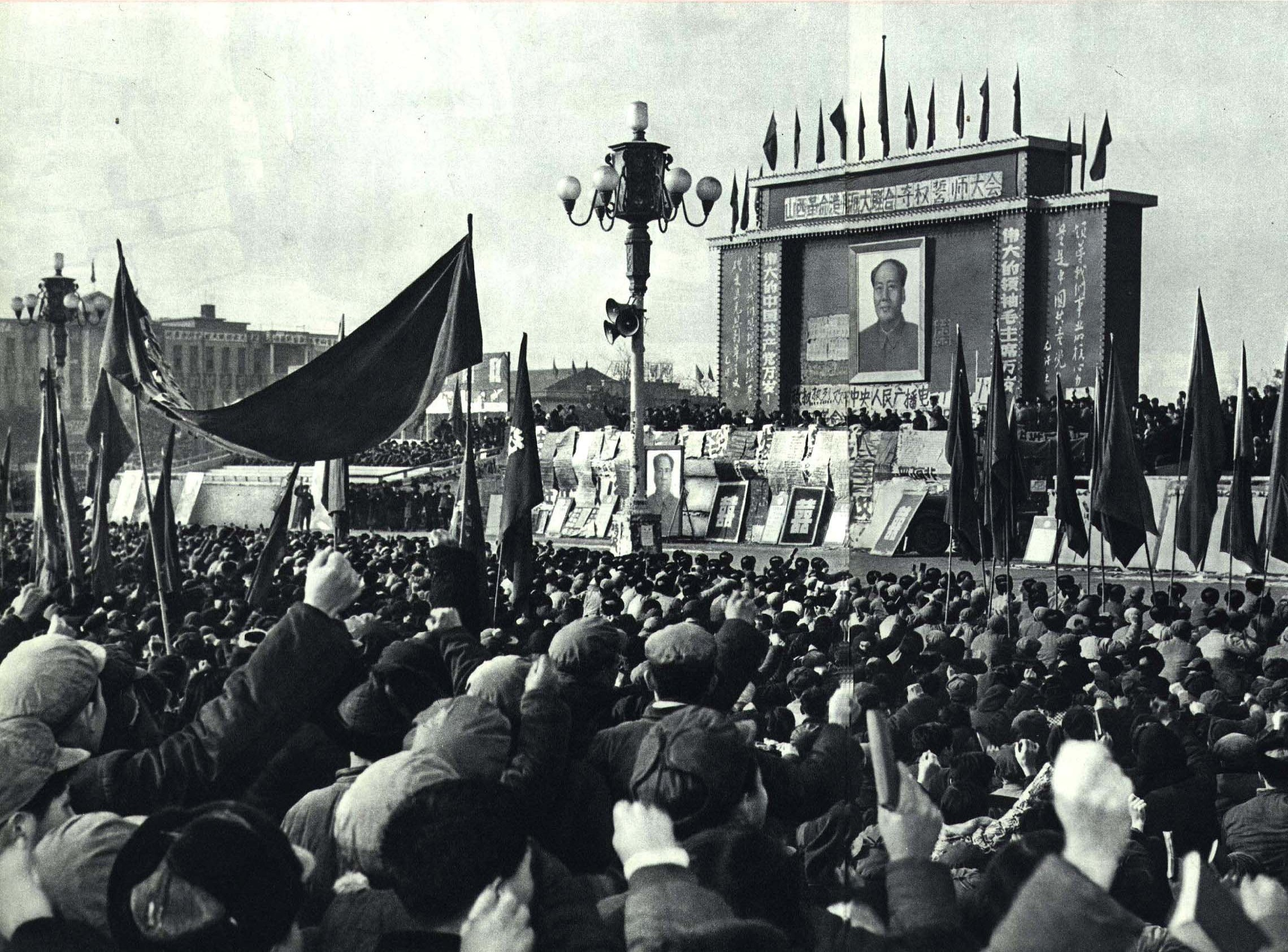
Communist states legitimizes public participation in state affairs as long as its done through democratic centralist channels and conducive to communism.

In contemporary China, for example, the state not only tolerates certain forms of public discussion but at times actively encourages them. This is reflected in practices such as state organs operating official Weibo accounts that promote discussion and solicit citizen reports about local problems. Yet, consistent with democratic centralism, the state also censors or suppresses criticism that exceeds authorized boundaries or occurs outside channels it controls. At the same time, there are documented cases in which the Chinese party–state has refrained from repressing demonstrations and has instead attempted to address public grievances through conciliatory actions or policy adjustments.

Participation is commonly codified in law, as illustrated by the 1977 Soviet constitution, which declared the goal of more extensive participation of citizens in the administration of the affairs of the society and the state, improvement of the state apparatus, increasing the activeness of social organizations, intensifying people's control, strengthening the legal basis of state and social life, expanding publicity, and constantly taking account of public opinion. As such, the Soviet Union adopted laws to handle citizen complaints and recommendations, thereby granting citizens a legal means to influence the state apparatus. During elections of deputies to the soviets, Soviet electors commonly adopted recommendations that the elected deputy was expected to pursue. The system also created organs of people's control, which, at the lower levels, were composed entirely of ordinary citizens and could supervise the state apparatus. However, at the higher levels, these organs were composed of professional cadres rather than ordinary citizens.

Popular participation is often legitimized in Marxist–Leninist thought. Chinese communism conceived the mass line as a core democratic centralist principle that propagates the notion that everything comes from the masses, and is adopted for the sake of the masses. The idea was that the party and/or state would collect ideas emanating from the people and transform them into policy that was in line with the political programme of communism. This was key, Mao reasoned, since states needed to rest on the principle of popular sovereignty, the idea that the state represents the will of the people, and the communist party needed to rule in conformity with this. However, to ensure this became reality, one had to accept the relationship that made a democratic state possible: no centralization meant no democracy, and centralization could not survive without democracy, since an effective state apparatus centralized power to collect information from across the country and to successfully implement policies. Mao believed that policies adopted in a democratic process would get the consent of the people. Centralism is the process of executing the policies reached through a democratic process, and if this process produces policies that are in accordance with the people's wishes, Mao believed policy implementation would go smoothly. Democracy then becomes synonymous with bottom-to-top information flow of popular demand, and centralism with the top-to-down implementation of policies.

In practice, this entails creating a democratic centralist system that can disseminate the "correct opinions", those in line with communism, emanating from the masses to central level organs, so that the highest organs can adopt a unified policy that can be implemented nationwide. Without democracy, Mao noted, the highest organ's input would be incomplete, preventing the formulation of sound policies, which would fundamentally reduce the organ's role to mere administration, what he called "a processing plant." The two components were thus considered by Mao to be functionally integrated: democracy provides the correct substance, while centralism provides the unified form.

=== Economic planning ===
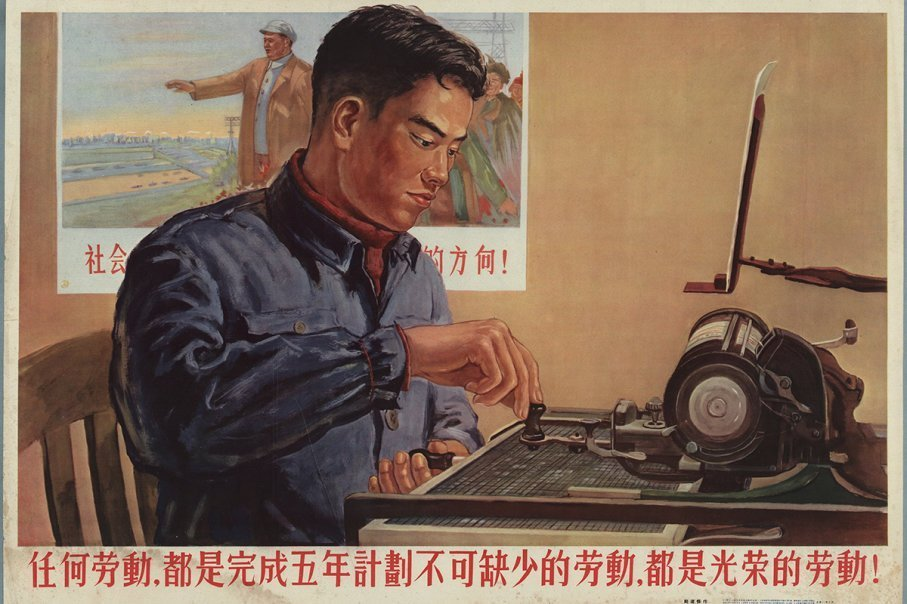
Five-year plans are example of democratic centralism in economic decision-making. This poster promotes one of China's five-year plans.

In his draft of the 1918 article, "The Immediate Tasks of the Soviet Government", Vladimir Lenin argued that the main task of the new Soviet state was to apply democratic centralism to the management of the national economy. He envisioned achieving this through a planned economy designed to ensure the harmonious and coordinated operation of economic enterprises such as railways, postal services, telegraphs, and other forms of transportation. Lenin emphasized that such centralism had to be rooted in a democratic system that encouraged the full and unrestricted development of local characteristics and initiatives. This would allow lower-level organs to experiment with different methods and strategies in pursuit of goals established by the center.

Lenin's writings on economic management strongly influenced later decision-makers in the Soviet Union and the wider communist world. The 27–29 December 1956 plenary session of the Central Committee of the Romanian Communist Party defined democratic centralism in the economic realm as "the combination of firm guidance by higher organs with the obligatory fulfillment of central directives and, at the same time, the autonomous resolution of local problems." A similar position appeared in the 1963 Hungarian Marxist–Leninist book, Textbook of Political Economy, which stated, "The planned direction of the economy is based on the Leninist principle of democratic centralism. This principle involves a combination of the planned, central direction of economic activities with the greatest development of the creative activity of the working masses".

Romanian economist Maria Dvoracek argued that the socialist mode of production necessarily requires centralized organization due to the scale of production and the class character of socialist property relations. Centralization without popular participation, she contended, would fail to produce an effective system of economic management. Accordingly, the socialist economy must combine coordinated, centralized leadership with popular participation, thereby transforming democratic centralism from a theoretical principle into an operational mechanism for directing the economy. The same logic applied to non-state socialist property forms. For example, Rezső Nyers, a Central Committee Secretary for Economic Policy of the Hungarian Socialist Workers' Party, argued in 1956, "Democratic centralism is the principle of the direction of the socialist economy, whichever precise [property] type of the planned economy is involved [...] In the case of the cooperatives, democratic centralism is valid even when these are self-governing. What is more, the principle is valid even as regards the relationship of the cooperatives and the central organs of cooperatives."

At the economic level, democratic centralism is institutionalized by concentrating the unified powers of the state in a supreme state organ of power (SSOP), which then delegates specific powers to lower-level state organs of power. From a Marxist–Leninist standpoint, this centralization is required to channel popular participation, particularly that of workers, into the construction of socialism. As the holder of unified power, the SSOP is authorized to adopt a unified state budget and a national economic plan, usually a five-year plan, that sets the economy's overall direction. Financially, this arrangement means that the central state apparatus, through the SSOP, establishes financial constraints for lower-level organs (and their subordinate institutions), while granting them independence within the framework of the plan unless otherwise specified.

Democratic centralism, as codified in the 1959 Law on Budget Rights of the Soviet Union, served as the mechanism for fiscal administration, postulating a dialectical synthesis between the bottom-up articulation of local budgetary needs (democracy) and the top-down ratification of a unified national financial policy (centralism). While this framework was theoretically designed to preserve the sovereign rights of union republics through a collaborative drafting process, its practical application frequently favored centralist command over democratic initiative. The "top-down ratification sequence and the centralized control of federal tax allocations effectively subordinated local jurisdictions," according to scholar Cameron Ross.

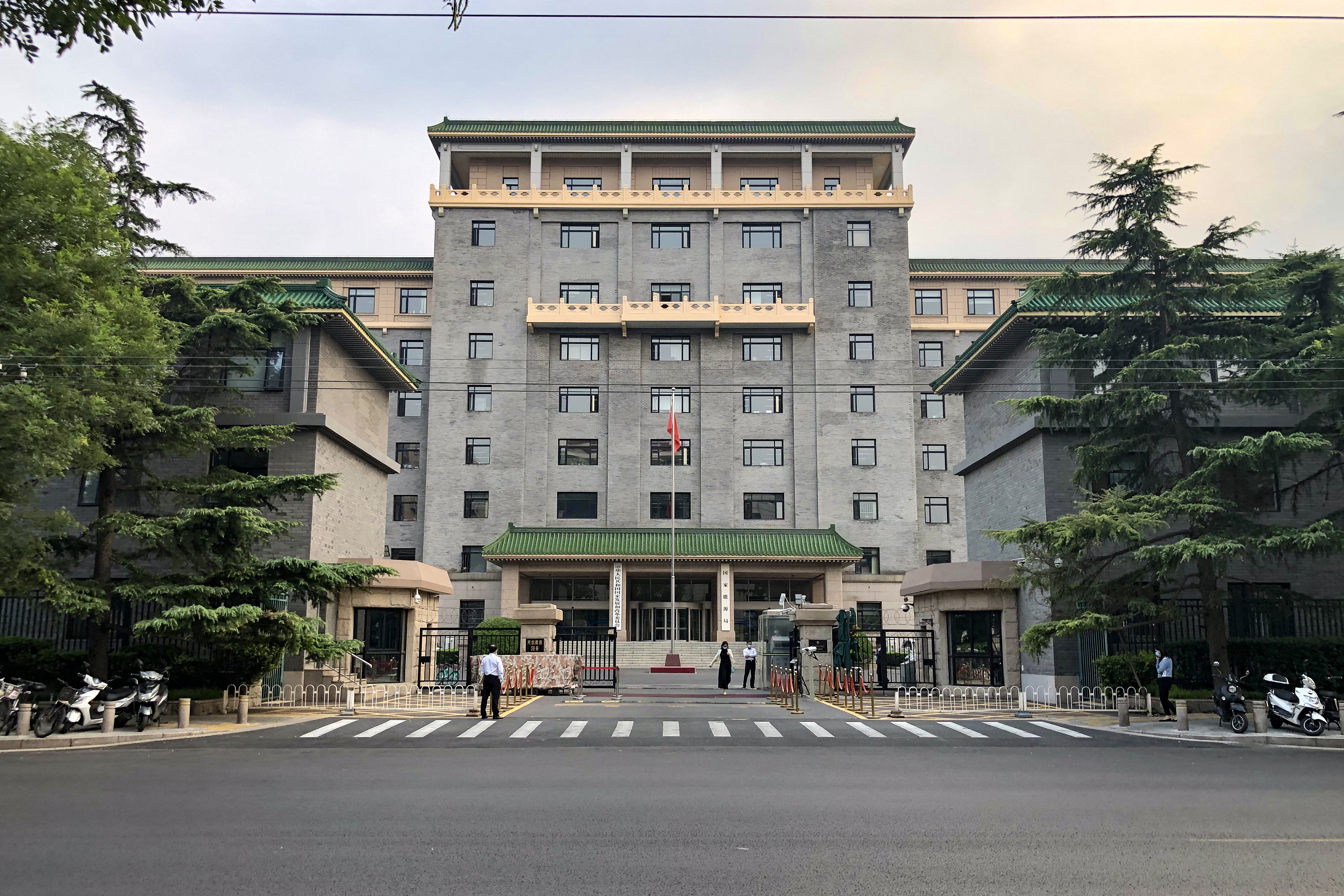
The headquarters of the National Development and Reform Commission, China's state planning organ

As with the state budget, democratic centralism is considered the underlying system that enables economic planning in communist states. It seeks, as was the case in the Soviet Union, to combine the planned guidance of central organs and the independence and initiatives of lower-level state organs, amalgamations, enterprises, and work units. It was believed that a plan could only be successful if it was formulated with the participation of the people, the implementers of the plan, under the supervision of the central state organs. In the Soviet Union, this meant that each segment of the proposed five-year plans was discussed and adopted at the republican party congresses and republican state organs of power before being finally adopted by the All-Union party congress and All-Union SSOP. It also sought feedback from transmission belt mass organisations, especially the trade unions.

A central tenet was that the national growth rate, the growth of specific industries, for example, could only be set by the central state planning organ. However, these rates can only be set realistically if the planning organ in question receives correct information about the economic situation through popular participation. It is also considered general wisdom that lower-level units, such as an enterprise, know its own situation better than the central planning organ. Therefore, it was important for the state plan that lower-level units could formulate counter-plans, which were proposals on how to improve productivity and increase the quality of goods within their specific unit.

The structural hallmark of communist planning systems, especially those practiced by the Soviet Union, was a high degree of institutional centralization. It was mediated through the operational principle of dual subordination. Within this framework, economic planning was carried out through a bifurcated network comprising specialized planning organs and sectoral managerial organs. These institutions included ministries, departments, and committees responsible for diverse economic functions such as finance, logistics, standardization, and statistical accounting. The institutional hierarchy of these planning organs was structured as a nested system of dual subordination.

In the Soviet Union, the State Planning Committee (Gosplan) functioned under the auspices of the USSR Council of Ministers, the supreme executive and administrative organ, which was the supreme authority for national economic coordination. Next in line were the Union-Republican Gosplans that operated at the republican level. These organs were characterized by being dually accountable, horizontally to the Council of Ministers of their respective Union Republic and vertically subordinate to the central Gosplan. Below them, one had the Gosplans of the autonomous republics, which were also organised on dual subordination, but they were horizontally subordinate to the Council of Ministers of the autonomous republic and vertically to the superior Union-Republican Gosplan. Local Gosplans at the municipal or area level were integrated into the unified state apparatus through subordination to the permanent organs of the local state organs of power, while simultaneously reporting vertically to the respective republican-level Gosplan. By enforcing dual subordination, the Soviet state established a unified, democratic centralist line of authority across the state apparatus.

== The leading role of the party in state and society ==
The leading role of the party is a core principle of communist states that gives the ruling communist party a monopoly on state power. This principle has been enacted differently across the communist world, but it has, in cases, meant that the party controls the state in some form. This position is legitimized due to the party's self-designated position as the vanguard of the working class. For example, the 1986 CPSU rulebook stated it was formed by "tried and tested militant vanguard of the Soviet people, which unites, on a voluntary basis, the more advanced, politically more conscious section of the working class, collective farm peasantry and intelligentsia of the USSR". This control of the state is formalized transparently by having a majority in the supreme state organ of power, whose members must adopt the policies of the central party leadership inline with democratic centralism. The party is also empowered to guide the activities of state organ of power and inferior state organs at all levels of governance.

=== The party's prime and guiding ideological-political role in Yugoslavia ===
After the Tito–Stalin split of 1948, the League of Communists of Yugoslavia (LCY) initiated a reform process that would discard much of the Soviet model. Between the 8th and 9th Congresses of the LCY (1964–69), extensive discussions took place on the nature of democracy within democratic centralism, which brought two important changes to the principle. First, unlike the traditional Soviet interpretation, the LCY increasingly emphasized the ordinary party member as the primary vehicle for policy formulation and implementation. Second, whereas the Soviet model stressed the party's leading role over state and society, LCY theorists now argued that the LCY was the leading ideological–political force within the socialist self-management system, rather than an entity standing above state and society monopolizing power.

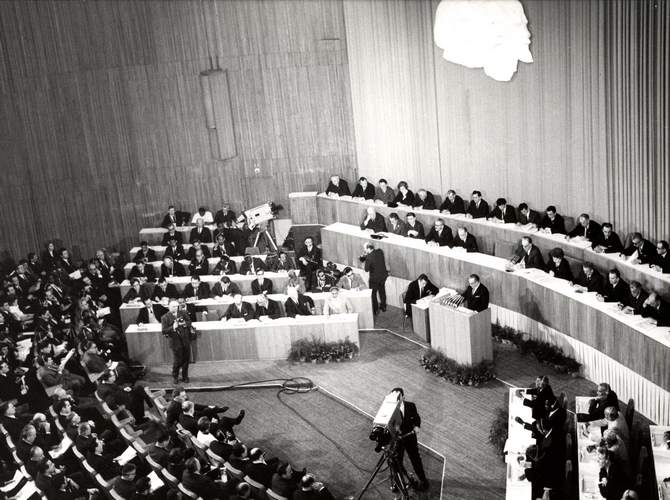
The LCY began reconceptualising its leading role in the 1960s. The picture depicts proceedings from the 9th LCY Congress, held in 1969.

While accepting the traditional tenet that within the LCY the majority ruled, leading LCY ideologue Edvard Kardelj argued that the party had to do away with the culture in which an LCY member had to change their opinion if they disagreed with the party's adopted policy. He reasoned that this was unproductive: a member who opposed a certain decision in the first place, and was forced to change his or her opinion, would not faithfully implement the decision in a productive way either. He also argued that this conviction that everyone had to align themselves with the decisions of the LCY Central Committee to establish "the illusion of monolithic unity" had produced the unforeseen consequence that every disagreement between members and collective decisions was treated "as a great problem" to party life.

Kardelj also championed the reconceptualization of the LCY Central Committee's role in society. In the traditional Soviet model, the Central Committee was perceived as the chief originator and creator of policy. Kardelj disagreed, instead reconceptualizing the LCY Central Committee as "a representative of the membership, of the working class, of working people in general." Due to that position, it could adopt and make decisions in the interests of the working class and other progressive social forces at given historical moments. However, that did not mean that the LCY Central Committee could monopolize the role of chief originator and creator of policy since, according to Kardelj, "the creators of policy in our society are many, even outside the LCY." This meant that the LCY reconceptualized the LCY Central Committee as having creative power only to the extent that it was capable of concentrating, so to speak, within itself the entire creative power of the socialist society and of acting as the institution where that power is realized.

Thus, the LCY moved to more thoroughly regulate members' rights, especially by protecting their rights to engage in debate, question leaders and collective organs, participate in policy decisions, and overall ability to take part in decision-making processes. To safeguard this, the LCY statute also sought to more clearly define the roles of its decision-making organs and their interrelationships. It was made expressly clear that organs could only function within the competences laid down in the statute, and could not trespass beyond them. It also explicitly stated that the LCY Central Committee worked to strengthen the unity of the LCY, but that it had to accept the autonomy of lower-level organizations. Unity was defined as "essential political positions, a unified ideology and a political-programmatic foundation for realizing long-term and immediate goals of socialist self-managing development and on unified principles of organization of Communists throughout the country".

Since most decision-making processes in Yugoslav society were no longer based on democratic centralism, party cadres in non-party positions had to engage in decision-making within self-management institutions and transmission-belt organizations by upholding socialist self-management principles and ensuring that their activities were in line with the LCY's democratic centralism. Despite this reconceptualization and the ensuing political reforms, longtime Yugoslav state and party leader Josip Broz Tito told the 11th LCY Congress, held in 1978, that democratic centralism "will remain in the future, as it has been until now, the fundamental principle of internal relations, of organisation, and of the entire activity of the LCY. This principle ensures the broadest democracy in shaping policy and in adopting decisions, and the firmest unity in their implementation." He also reiterated that while party members were free to retain dissenting opinions, majority decisions were binding, and failure to carry them out would undermine party unity and foster factionalism.

== See also ==
- Organic centralism
- Democratic centralism (Kuomintang)
