= Kang Yi (politician, born 1966) =

Chinese banker and politician

- 康义

Director of the National Bureau of Statistics
- Incumbent
- Assumed office 3 March 2022
- Premier: Li Keqiang; Li Qiang
- Preceded by: Ning Jizhe

Personal details
- Born: August 1966 (age 60) Shuangfeng County, Hunan, China
- Party: Chinese Communist Party
- Education: Shanghai University of Finance and Economics

Chinese name
- Simplified Chinese: 康义
- Traditional Chinese: 康義
Transcriptions
Standard Mandarin
- Hanyu Pinyin: Kāng Yì

Kang Yi (Chinese: 康义; born August 1966) is a Chinese banker and politician and the current director of the National Bureau of Statistics, in office since March 2022.

== Biography ==
Kang was born in Shuangfeng County, Hunan, in August 1966 and graduated from Shanghai University of Finance and Economics. He joined the Chinese Communist Party (CCP) in July 1986.

Beginning in 1988, he served in several posts in China Construction Bank, including vice president of Hubei Branch, president of Gansu Branch, and president of Fujian Branch. In November 2016, he was promoted to become vice president of the Agricultural Bank of China, a position he held until 2018.

In January 2018, he was appointed vice mayor of Tianjin, he remained in that position until March 2022, when he was transferred to Beijing and appointed director of the National Bureau of Statistics.

Government offices
Preceded by Ning Jizhe	Director of the National Bureau of Statistics; 2022–present	Incumbent
