= State Council Research Office =

State Council of the People's Republic of China

State Council Research Office 国务院研究室
- Abbreviation: Guoyanshi (国研室)
- Formation: 1995; 31 years ago
- Type: Office of the State Council
- Headquarters: Beijing
- Director: Shen Danyang
- Deputy Directors: Kang Xuping, Xiao Yanshun, Chen Changsheng
- Parent organization: State Council of the People's Republic of China

State Council Research Office
- Simplified Chinese: 国务院研究室
- Traditional Chinese: 國務院研究室
Transcriptions
Standard Mandarin
- Hanyu Pinyin: Guówùyuàn Yánjiūshì

Abbreviation
- Simplified Chinese: 國研室
- Traditional Chinese: 国研室
Transcriptions
Standard Mandarin
- Hanyu Pinyin: Guóyánshì

The State Council Research Office (SCRO) is the administrative office within the State Council of China in charge of formulating policy, conducting research, policy recommendations and consultation on strategic, organizational, services related to the State Council. It aims to improve the functions and governance of the State Council.

== History ==
The office was established in 1995. Its current director is Shen Danyang.

== Functions ==
The SCRO is in charge of formulating policy, conducting research, policy recommendations and consultation on strategic, organizational, services related to the State Council. It aims to improve the functions and governance of the State Council. It also takes a leading role in the drafting of the annual government work report.

== Structure ==
The State Council Research Office is organized in the following departments:

- Secretariat (Department of Personnel, Department of Foreign Affairs)
- Comprehensive Research Department I (Development Strategy Research Department)
- Comprehensive Research Department II
- Macroeconomic Research Department
- International Research Department
- Industry, Commerce and Trade Research Department
- Rural Economic Research Department
- Social Development Research Department
- Department of Research, Science, Culture and Health
- Information Research Department
- Communist Party Committee Office

== Leadership ==
=== Directors ===
Name	Chinese name	Took office	Left office	Ref.
Yuan Mu	袁木	1988	1995	
Wang Mengkui	王梦奎	1995	1998	
Gui Shiyong	桂世镛	March 1998	February 2001	
Wei Liqun	魏礼群	2001	2008	
Xie Fuzhan	谢伏瞻	June 2008	March 2013	
Ning Jizhe	宁吉喆	August 2013	August 2015	
Huang Shouhong	黄守宏	6 July 2016	27 September 2024	
Shen Danyang	沈丹阳	27 September 2024	Incumbent	
