= China Statistics Press =

Chinese state publishing company

China Statistics Press (Chinese: 中国统计出版社) is a Chinese publishing entity that disseminates statistics, statistical theories, and monographs. It operates under the National Bureau of Statistics and is situated in the Fengtai District of Beijing.

Founded in September 1955, it is based in Beijing and published by the National Bureau of Statistics of China. Its publications include yearbooks, textbooks, translated books, reference works, and statistical books. Many statistical publications from the Soviet Union were translated and published by the press.
