= China Statistical Yearbook =

- Language: Chinese and English
- Subject: Statistical yearbook
- Publisher: China Statistics Press
- Publication date: 1982–present
- ISBN: 978-7-5037-5124-0

The China Statistical Yearbook (Chinese: 中国统计年鉴), also translated into English as China Statistical Annual, is a large-scale yearbook of statistical information comprehensively reflecting the economic and social development of the People's Republic of China. It covers the statistics of China and all provinces, autonomous regions and municipalities directly under the Central Government for the previous year, and selects the main indicators for several years and recent years. it has been published annually since 1982 by China Statistics Press.

The China Statistical Yearbook is the most complete and systematic data yearbook published for the first time since the founding of PRC. The Yearbook is published in both Chinese and English for distribution in China and abroad. Its first issue was published in August 1982 by China Statistics Press.
