= Socialist property =

Socialist property is a term used in the Soviet Union and other socialist countries to refer to state, public and cooperative property.

It was proclaimed that under socialism, public socialist property exists in two forms: 1) in the form of state property and 2) in the form of cooperative–collective economic property. It was pointed out that state property is the common property of the people, and cooperative–collective economic property is group property, the property of individual collectives or associations of workers.

In the Soviet Union it was proclaimed that state (common people's) property is the common property of the entire Soviet people. The land, its subsoil, waters, and forests were the exclusive property of the state in the Soviet Union. Also, state property included the main means of production in industry, construction and agriculture, means of transport and communications, banks, property of state–organized trade, utilities and other enterprises, and the main urban housing stock.

Collective economic–cooperative property included the property of collective farms, as well as commercial cooperatives, consumer societies, and housing construction cooperatives.

== Protection of socialist property ==
A researcher of the criminal world of Russia and the Soviet Union, Soviet dissident Valery Chalidze noted that even in tsarist times, Russians were characterized by "neglect of the property rights of the treasury", and this tradition "remained significant in Soviet times. This tradition has become unusually widespread... also due to the fact that now almost everything around is the property of the treasury or state property".

The Soviet state has been concerned with the problem of protecting socialist property from selfish attacks since the mid-1920s: the Criminal Code of the Russian Socialist Federative Soviet Republic of 1926 included articles on property, official, and economic crimes.

Article 109 provided for punishment for abuse of official position for personal gain, 116th – for embezzlement, 129th – for concluding deals that are obviously unfavorable for the state, 162nd (points "d", "e") – for theft of state property, 169th, Part 2 – for fraud. Even then, punishment for crimes against state property was harsher than for claims against personal property.

For example, for the theft of personal property committed for the first time and without collusion with third parties, imprisonment or forced labor of up to three months, and a maximum of a year of imprisonment, were imposed. For ordinary theft of state property, up to 2 years of imprisonment or a year of forced labor were imposed, for qualified theft – up to five years. Fraud against a private individual could be punished by imprisonment for up to two years, and against the state – up to five. The maximum term of imprisonment under articles of the Criminal Code of the Russian Socialist Federative Soviet Republic 109, 116 and 129 reached 10 years.

After collectivization and the onset of famine in some regions of the Soviet Union, punishments for the theft of socialist property were tightened at the suggestion of Joseph Stalin: in especially serious cases they were even punishable by execution. Motivating the need for such brutal measures, Stalin wrote to the People's Commissar of Agriculture Lazar Kaganovich and the head of the government Vyacheslav Molotov:

Capitalism could not have broken feudalism, it would not have developed and strengthened if it had not declared the principle of private property to be the basis of capitalist society, if it had not made private property sacred property, violation of the interests of which is strictly punished and for the protection of which it created its own state. Socialism will not be able to finish off and bury the capitalist elements and individually greedy habits, skills, traditions (which serve as the basis for theft), which are shaking the foundations of the new society, if it does not declare public property (cooperative, collective economic, state) sacred and inviolable. It cannot strengthen and develop the new system and socialist construction if it does not protect the property of collective farms, cooperatives, and the state with all its might, if it does not discourage antisocial, kulak–capitalist elements from plundering public property.

On June 4, 1947, a decree "On Criminal Liability for Theft of State and Public Property" was issued, after which the resolution of the Central Executive Committee and the Council of People's Commissars of the Soviet Union dated August 7, 1932 (hence the "Law Seven–Eight") "On the Protection of State Property Enterprises, Collective Farms and Cooperation and Strengthening Public (Socialist) Property" has lost force. At the same time, a decree "On Strengthening the Protection of Citizens' Personal Property" was adopted. Thus, a gradation of property was established: state, public, personal. For encroachment on state and public property, the punishment was higher.

According to the decree of 1947, theft of socialist property was punishable by imprisonment for a term of 7 to 10 years with or without confiscation of property.

The same approach was reflected in the Criminal Code of the Russian Soviet Federative Socialist Republic of 1960, which declared the task of this act to be the protection of the social system of the Soviet Union, socialist property, personal rights and freedoms of citizens, as well as the socialist legal order from criminal attacks.

Article 93, Part 1, which supplemented the Criminal Code with the Law of July 25, 1962, allowed the application of the death penalty to those guilty of theft on an especially large scale (amounting to more than 10 thousand rubles and taking into account the significance of the stolen property for the national economy). The use of the death penalty for such crimes was abolished by the law of the Russian Soviet Federative Socialist Republic on December 5, 1991, when Russia had already begun a widespread rejection of socialism in favor of capitalism.

== Liquidation of socialist property ==
On June 25, 1990, the Council of Ministers of the Soviet Union adopted a resolution, according to which, on the basis of the Kama Automobile Plants, one of the first joint–stock companies of the Russian Soviet Federative Socialist Republic and the Soviet Union was created – the Kama Automobile Plant Joint–Stock Company, in which 51% of the shares should be were to remain in common union ownership, the rest were supposed to be sold. On September 5, 1991, the sale of shares to the workforce began. On September 10, a competition for legal entities was held, as a result of which 230 enterprises and organizations became shareholders of the Kama Automobile Plant.

On July 3, 1991, the Law of the Russian Soviet Federative Socialist Republic "On the Privatization of State and Municipal Enterprises in the Russian Soviet Federative Socialist Republic" was adopted, which entrusted the State Committee of the Russian Federation for State Property Management with the privatization of common public property. In November 1991, Anatoly Chubais became its chairman.

Until mid–1992, the Supreme Council of the Russian Federation adopted a number of laws and resolutions regulating the processes of privatization and bankruptcy of economic entities, including the Laws of the Russian Federation "On Registered Privatization Accounts and Deposits in the Russian Soviet Federative Socialist Republic" and the Law "On Property in the Russian Soviet Federative Socialist Republic".

In November 1991, the stage of forced privatization began. It was based on Decree No. 341 of the President of the Russian Federation dated December 29, 1991, which approved the "Basic Provisions of the Program for the Privatization of State and Municipal Enterprises for 1992". Decree No. 66 of January 29, 1992 "On Accelerating the Privatization of State and Municipal Enterprises" determined the practical mechanism of privatization.

As a result of privatization, a significant part of Russian enterprises, which were the common property of the people, became private property for almost nothing, creating the basis for the emergence of oligarchs and a huge economic stratification of the Russian population.
