= National Bureau of Statistics of China =

China's principal government institution in charge of statistics and census data

- 国家统计局; Guójiā Tǒngjìjú

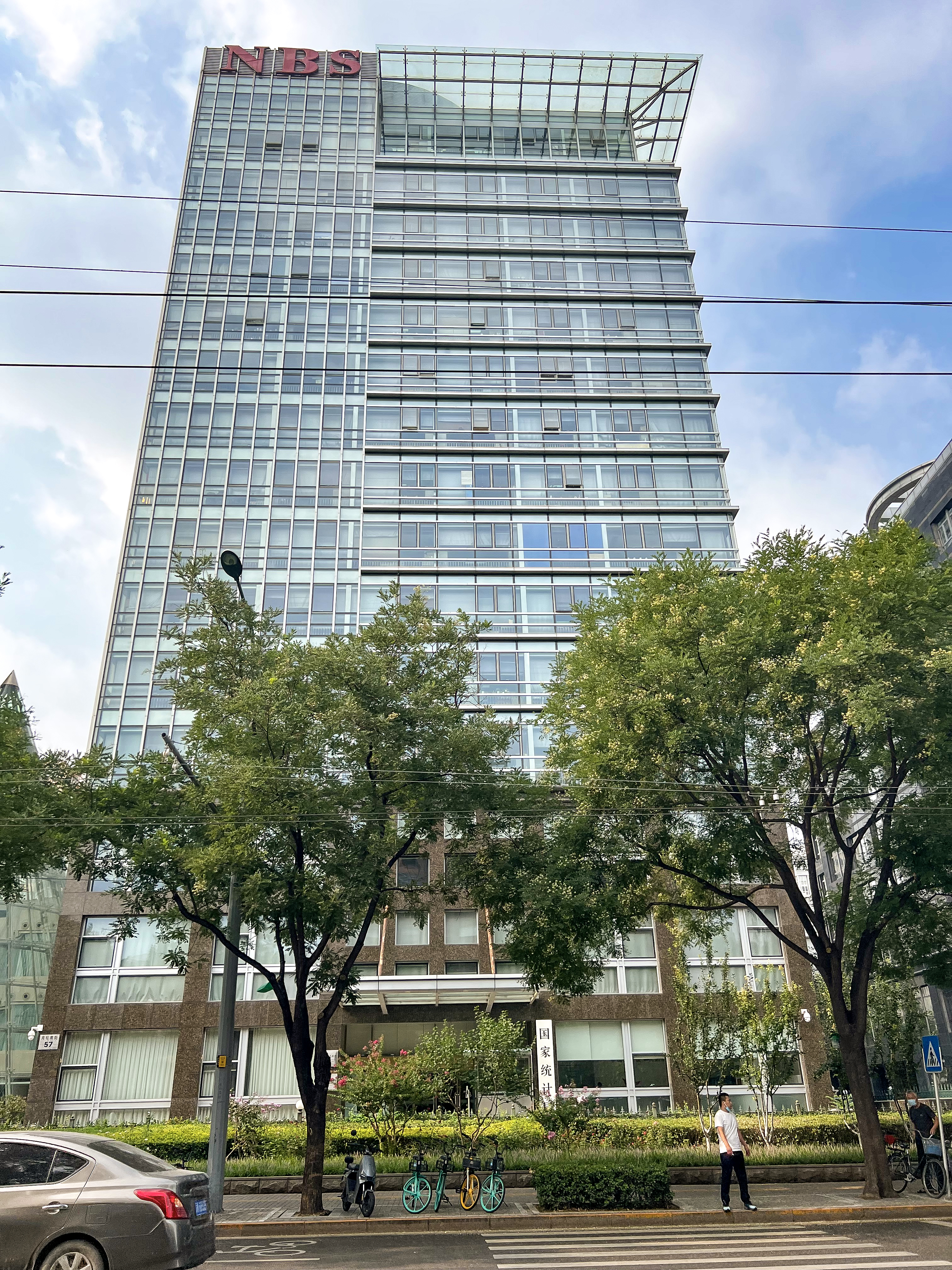
- Headquarters of the Bureau

Agency overview
- Formed: August 7, 1952; 74 years ago
- Headquarters: 57 Yuetan South Street, Xicheng, Beijing, China
- Agency executive: Kang Yi, Director
- Parent agency: State Council
- Website: www.stats.gov.cn

National Bureau of Statistics
- Simplified Chinese: 国家统计局
- Traditional Chinese: 國家統計局
Transcriptions
Standard Mandarin
- Hanyu Pinyin: Guójiā Tǒngjìjú

The National Bureau of Statistics of China (Chinese: 国家统计局) is a deputy-ministerial level agency directly under the State Council of China. Established in August 1952, the bureau is responsible for collection, investigation, research and publication of statistics concerning the nation's economy, population and other aspects of the society.

Kang Yi has served as the commissioner of the bureau since 3 March 2022.

== Responsibilities ==
The bureau's authority and responsibilities are defined in Statistics Law of the People's Republic of China. It is responsible for the research of the nation's overall statistics and oversees the operations of its local counterparts.

== Organizations ==
The bureau is overseen by a commissioner, several deputy commissioners (currently four), a chief methodologist, a chief economist, and a chief information officer. It is composed of 18 departments, oversees 12 affiliated institutions, and manages 32 survey organizations stationed in respective provinces. It also operates China Statistics Press, which was founded in 1955.

The national bureau has 535 employees as authorized by the State Council.

=== Commissioner ===
- Xue Muqiao (August 1952 – November 1958)
- Jia Qiyun (November 1958 – June 1961)
- Wang Sihua (June 1961 – December 1969)
- Chen Xian (September 1974 – October 1981)
- Li Chengrui (October 1981 – May 1984)
- Zhang Sai (May 1984 – February 1997)
- Liu Hong (February 1997 – June 2000)
- Zhu Zhixin (June 2000 – March 2003)
- Li Deshui (March 2003 – March 2006)
- Qiu Xiaohua (March 2006 – October 2006)
- Xie Fuzhan (October 2006 – September 2008)
- Ma Jiantang (September 2008 – April 2015)
- Wang Bao'an (April 2015 – January 2016)
- Ning Jizhe (February 2016 – March 2022)
- Kang Yi (March 2022 – present)

== Access ==
Its Statistical Communiqué on the National Economic and Social Development and the China Statistical Yearbook are the bureau's most notable publications. It also runs and publishes the national census of economy, population and agriculture.

=== Internet ===
National Data (National Statistical Data Repository) is operated by the bureau, which has both Chinese and English interfaces. All publishable statistical results are released by the bureau on this website, including data on monthly, quarterly, and annual price indices and industrial statistics, etc.

In December 2018, the agency began to release detailed datasets to authorized researchers and universities using an application-based system for researchers residing in China. This includes datasets from the 3rd economic census, 6th population census, 3rd agricultural census, sampled 1% population survey of 2015, residents income survey, and financials survey on industrial enterprises above a designated size.

=== Archive ===
The bureau also operates an archive filled with almanacs ever published by the bureau since 1982, some of the files are not digitalized, hence only accessible through the archive. Citizens can access the archive with their national identification card.

== See also ==
- Census in China
- China microcensus
- Economic statistics
