= Unified state apparatus =

Communist state institution

The unified state apparatus is the institutional structure of communist states, characterized by its organization into a single, unitary line of state power. In this system, the Marxist–Leninist principle of unified power dictates that all state power emanates from the people. This power is channeled through a pyramid-structured system of state organs of power. This hierarchy is headed at its apex by the supreme state organ of power (SSOP). The SSOP serves as the sole holder of unified power and delegates specific functions to other organs—such as the lower-level state organs of power, executive, judiciary, and procuracy—as it deems necessary.

This unified structure serves as the essential framework for the practice of democratic centralism, facilitating a vertical chain of command where decisions are made centrally and implemented uniformly across all levels of the state hierarchy. By rejecting the separation of powers in favor of a unified vertical line, the apparatus ensures that lower-level organs remain administrative extensions of the center rather than autonomous polities.

== Concept ==
The concept of a unified state apparatus has been given different names in different communist states. In former East Germany, it was referred to as the "unitary socialist state power", while the present-day communist state of Vietnam simply refers to it as the state apparatus of a unified character. All state organs of communist states are organs of the unified state apparatus. In East Germany, regarding the Supreme Court, the official understanding was that "the courts of [East Germany] are an inseparable component of the unitary socialist state power."

The supreme state organ of power heads the unified state apparatus. This is why, for example, the 1936 Constitution of the Soviet Union designated the Supreme Soviet as the supreme state organ of power: it held the supreme powers of the state.

All other state organs are subordinate to the supreme state organ of power, and it acts as the chief lawmaker and the pinnacle of the constitutional system. This also means, as was the case in the Soviet Union, that the supreme state organ of power controlled the lower-level soviets. From a Marxist−Leninist perspective, the supreme state organ of power personifies the people's will. According to Andrey Vyshinsky, a leading Soviet legal theorist who served as the Procurator General of the Soviet Union, power is "personified in the [supreme state organ of power], the will of the people—of the masses of millions of workers, peasants and intellectuals—finds expression."

In communist states, all state organs are elected by the supreme state organ of power, which is either directly elected through controlled elections, as they were in the Soviet Union, or indirectly elected, as in the People's Republic of China.

== See also ==
- Unified power
- Separation of powers
- Fusion of powers
