= National Academy of Governance =

Chinese civil servant training institution

- 国家行政学院
- Type: Public
- Active: 1994–2018
- President: Cai Qi
- Location: Haidian, Beijing, China; 39°57′33.67″N 116°18′6.35″E
- Campus: Urban
- Website: www.ccps.gov.cn

Chinese name
- Simplified Chinese: 国家行政学院
- Traditional Chinese: 國家行政學院
Transcriptions
Standard Mandarin
- Hanyu Pinyin: Guójiā Xíngzhèng Xuéyuàn

The National Academy of Governance (国家行政学院) is an external name of the Central Party School of the Chinese Communist Party. It was a public administration academy for high- and middle-level national civil servants in China, affiliated with the State Council. It opened in September 1994 and was located in Haidian, Beijing. The school was merged into the Central Party School in 2018 by Xi Jinping's reform of state and party institutions.

The academy was previously also known as China National School of Administration and the Chinese Academy of Governance.

== History ==
The National Academy of Governance was established by a decision of the 7th National People's Congress in March 1988 and officially opened on 21 September 1994. It was an institution responsible for training high- and middle-level national civil servants, high-level managers and policy research personnel, providing government management policy advice, and conducting theoretical research in the fields of public administration.

The academy was merged into the Central Party School in March 2018 as part of the deepening the reform of the Party and state institutions. The name "National Academy of Governance" is retained by the Central Party School as a secondary name under a one institution with two names arrangement.
