= Zhengxing, Jinggu County =

Zhengxing Town 正兴镇
- Town
- Location in Yunnan.
- Coordinates: 23°19′56″N 100°57′49″E
- Country: People's Republic of China
- Province: Yunnan
- Prefecture-level city: Pu'er City
- Autonomous county: Jinggu Dai and Yi Autonomous County

Area
  - Total: 883 km^{2} (341 sq mi)
- Elevation: 1,905 m (6,250 ft)

Population (2020)
  - Total: 20,476
  - Density: 23.2/km^{2} (60.1/sq mi)
- Time zone: UTC+08:00 (China Standard)
- Postal code: 666407
- Area code: 0879

Zhengxing (simplified Chinese: 正兴镇; traditional Chinese: 正興鎮; pinyin: Zhèngxīng Zhèn) is a town in Jinggu Dai and Yi Autonomous County, Yunnan, China. As of the 2020 census it had a population of 20,476 and an area of 883-square-kilometre (341 sq mi).

== Administrative division ==
As of 2016, the town is divided into eleven villages:

- Jingnan (景南村)
- Boyun (波云村)
- Xinzhai (新寨村)
- Shuiping (水平村)
- Menglie (勐烈村)
- Tiechang (铁厂村)
- Zhengxing (正兴村)
- Tongda (通达村)
- Mengnai (勐乃村)
- Weng'an (翁安村)
- Huangcaoba (黄草坝村)

== Geography ==
The town is situated at eastern Jinggu Dai and Yi Autonomous County. The town is bordered to the north by Weiyuan Town and Fengshan, to the east and south by Ning'er Hani and Yi Autonomous County, and to the west by Yizhi Township.

The Xiaohei River (小黑江) flows through the town.

== Economy ==
The local economy is primarily based upon agriculture. Commercial crops include tobacco, natural rubber, and vegetable. The region also has an abundance of limestone, copper, lead, and zinc.

== Demographics ==
Population census
Year	Pop.	±%
2004	19,880	—
2017	17,680	−11.1%
2020	20,476	+15.8%

As of 2020, the National Bureau of Statistics of China estimates the town's population now to be 20,476.

== Tourist attractions ==
The Mengnai Immortal Cave (勐乃仙人洞) is a famous scenic spot in the town, famous for its karst cave.

== Transportation ==
The China National Highway 323 passes across western Zhengxing.
