= Bi'an Township =

Bi'an Township 碧安乡
- Township
- Location in Yunnan.
- Coordinates: 23°04′24″N 100°26′27″E
- Country: People's Republic of China
- Province: Yunnan
- Prefecture-level city: Pu'er City
- Autonomous county: Jinggu Dai and Yi Autonomous County

Area
  - Total: 972.8 km^{2} (375.6 sq mi)
- Elevation: 1,291.5 m (4,237 ft)

Population (2020)
  - Total: 23,279
  - Density: 23.93/km^{2} (61.98/sq mi)
- Time zone: UTC+08:00 (China Standard)
- Postal code: 666405
- Area code: 0879

Bi'an Township (simplified Chinese: 碧安乡; traditional Chinese: 碧安鄉; pinyin: Bì'ān Xiāng) is a township in Jinggu Dai and Yi Autonomous County, Yunnan, China. As of the 2020 census it had a population of 23,279 and an area of 972.8-square-kilometre (375.6 sq mi).

== Administrative division ==
As of 2016, the town is divided into sixteen villages:

- Mengzhu (勐主村)
- Qiande (迁德村)
- Guangming (光明村)
- Dazhai (大寨村)
- Mangjing (芒景村)
- Guoda (过达村)
- Xiben (昔本村)
- Manhe (漫河村)
- Bianjiang (边江村)
- Pingzhang (平掌村)
- Wenming (文明村)
- Hetou (河头村)
- Shangzhai (上寨村)
- Yaofang (窑房村)
- Yunzhong (云中村)
- Huangcaoling (黄草岭村)

== History ==
The township formerly known as "Biling Township" (碧岭乡). After the establishment of the Communist State, in 1950, Anle Township (安乐乡) was merged into and it was renamed "Bi'an Township" (碧安乡).

== Geography ==
The township is situated at southwestern Jinggu Dai and Yi Autonomous County. It is surrounded by Yongping Town on the north, Mengban Township and Lancang Lahu Autonomous County on the west, Yizhi Township on the east, and Simao District on the south.

There are three rivers in the township, namely the Weiyuan River (威远江), Xiaohei River (小黑江), and Lancang River.

== Economy ==
The township's economy is based on nearby mineral resources and agricultural resources. Tobacco, tea, and walnut are the economic plants of this region. The region abounds with iron and copper.

== Demographics ==
Population census
Year	Pop.	±%
2004	23,376	—
2020	23,279	−0.4%

As of 2020, the National Bureau of Statistics of China estimates the township's population now to be 23,279.
