= Yizhi Township =

Yizhi Township 益智乡
- Township
- Location in Yunnan.
- Coordinates: 23°12′02″N 100°35′29″E
- Country: People's Republic of China
- Province: Yunnan
- Prefecture-level city: Pu'er City
- Autonomous county: Jinggu Dai and Yi Autonomous County

Area
  - Total: 789 km^{2} (305 sq mi)

Population (2020)
  - Total: 14,182
  - Density: 18.0/km^{2} (46.6/sq mi)
- Time zone: UTC+08:00 (China Standard)
- Postal code: 666406
- Area code: 0879

Yizhi Township (simplified Chinese: 益智乡; traditional Chinese: 益智鄉; pinyin: Yìzhì Xiāng) is a township in Jinggu Dai and Yi Autonomous County, Yunnan, China. As of the 2017 census it had a population of 14,182 and an area of 789-square-kilometre (305 sq mi).

== Administrative division ==
As of 2016, the town is divided into nine villages:

- Zhonghe (中和村)
- Yixiang (益香村)
- Datian (大田村)
- Gonghe (共和村)
- Zhexing (者行村)
- Tangfang (塘房村)
- Heping (和平村)
- Shizhai (石寨村)
- Mangqian (芒迁村)

== Geography ==
It lies at the southern of Jinggu Dai and Yi Autonomous County, bordering Bi'an Township and Yongping Town to the west, Simao District and Ning'er Hani and Yi Autonomous County to the south, Weiyuan Town to the north, and Zhengxing to the east.

The Weiyuan River (威远江) and Xiaohei River (小黑河) flow through the township.

== Economy ==
The local economy is primarily based upon agriculture. The main crops of the region are rice, followed by corn and potato.

== Demographics ==
Population census
| Year | Pop. | ±% |
|---|---|---|
| 2004 | 14,447 | — |
| 2020 | 14,182 | −1.8% |

As of 2020, the National Bureau of Statistics of China estimates the township's population now to be 14,182.

== Tourist attractions ==
The Fairy Cave (仙人洞), Shrimp Cave (虾子洞) and Bat Cave (蝙蝠洞) are main attractions in the township.
