= Weiyuan =

Weiyuan may refer to following in China:

- Weiyuan County, Gansu (渭源县), of Dingxi, Gansu
- Weiyuan County, Sichuan (威远县), of Neijiang, Sichuan

Towns (威远镇)

- Weiyuan, Changshun County, in Changshun County, Guizhou
- Weiyuan, Huzhu County, in Huzhu Tu Autonomous County, Qinghai
- Weiyuan, Youyu County, in Youyu County, Shanxi
- Weiyuan, Jinggu County, in Jinggu Dai and Yi Autonomous County, Yunnan

Weapons

- the Weiyuan General Cannon, a mortar used during the Qing dynasty
