= Fengshan =

Fengshan may refer to:

- Feng Shan, Chinese religious ritual

== Geographic names ==
=== People's Republic of China ===
- Fengshan County, Guangxi (凤山县)

Subdistricts (凤山街道)

- Fengshan Subdistrict, Shanwei, in Cheng District, Shanwei, Guangdong
- Fengshan Subdistrict, Fengcheng, Liaoning
- Fengshan Subdistrict, Lüliang, in Lishi District, Lüliang, Shanxi
- Fengshan Subdistrict, Yuyao, Zhejiang

Towns

Written as "丰山镇":

- Fengshan, Hua'an County, Fujian
- Fengshan, Xiaochang County, Hubei

Written as "凤山镇":

- Fengshan, Luoyuan County, Fujian
- Fengshan, Bobai County, Guangxi
- Fengshan, Liucheng County, Guangxi
- Fengshan, Guizhou, in Fuquan
- Fengshan, Fengning County, Hebei
- Fengshan, Shijiazhuang, in Jingxing Mining District, Shijiazhuang, Hebei
- Fengshan, Tonghe County, Heilongjiang
- Fengshan, Luotian County, Hubei
- Fengshan, Jinggu County, Jinggu Dai and Yi Autonomous County, Yunnan
- Fengshan, Fengqing County, Fengqing County, Yunnan

Townships

Written as "丰山乡":

- Fengshan Township, Heilongjiang, in Hailun
- Fengshan Township, Shicheng County, Jiangxi

Written as "凤山乡":

- Fengshan Township, Anyuan County, Jiangxi
- Fengshan Township, Sichuan, in Shunqing District, Nanchong

Villages (凤山村)

- Fengshan, Dongfeng, in Dongsheng, Shishou, Jingzhou, Hubei

=== Singapore ===
- Fengshan Single Member Constituency

=== Taiwan ===
- Fongshan District (鳳山區), district of Kaohsiung
- Fengshan Old City (鳳山縣舊城）, or Old City of Zuoying, walled city in Tsoying, Kaohsiung
- Fengshan River (鳳山溪), in the north of the island
- Fengshan railway station

== People ==
- Fengshan (1860–1911), a Manchu general
- Ho Feng-Shan (1901–1997), Chinese diplomat
