= Banpo Township, Jinggu County =

Banpo Township 半坡乡
- Township
- Location in Yunnan.
- Coordinates: 23°13′06″N 100°11′24″E
- Country: People's Republic of China
- Province: Yunnan
- Prefecture-level city: Pu'er City
- Autonomous county: Jinggu Dai and Yi Autonomous County

Area
  - Total: 355.1 km^{2} (137.1 sq mi)

Population (2020)
  - Total: 11,213
  - Density: 31.58/km^{2} (81.78/sq mi)
- Time zone: UTC+08:00 (China Standard)
- Postal code: 666403
- Area code: 0879

Banpo Township (simplified Chinese: 半坡乡; traditional Chinese: 半坡鄉; pinyin: Bànpō Xiāng) is a township in Jinggu Dai and Yi Autonomous County, Yunnan, China. As of the 2020 census it had a population of 11,213 and an area of 355.1-square-kilometre (137.1 sq mi).

== Administrative division ==
As of 2016, the town is divided into nine villages:

- Banpo (半坡村)
- Mansan (曼伞村)
- Anhai (安海村)
- Bandu (班独村)
- Banka (班卡村)
- Jiangjia (蒋家村)
- Mangdai (芒傣村)
- Mangwen (芒温村)
- Bansai (班赛村)

== Geography ==
It lies at the southwestern of Jinggu Dai and Yi Autonomous County, bordering Lancang Lahu Autonomous County and Shuangjiang Lahu, Va, Blang and Dai Autonomous County to the west, Yongping to the northeast, and Mengban Township to the south.

The Waili Stream (崴里河) flows through the northern Banpo Township.

The Lancang River is the western border between Banpo Township and Lancang Lahu Autonomous County and Shuangjiang Lahu, Va, Blang and Dai Autonomous County.

== Economy ==
The region's economy is based on agriculture, animal husbandry, and mineral resources. Tobacco, tea, natural rubber, and walnut are the economic plants of this region. The region has an abundance of copper, iron, lead and zinc.

== Demographics ==
Population census
Year	Pop.	±%
2004	14,222	—
2017	10,048	−29.3%
2020	11,213	+11.6%

As of 2020, the National Bureau of Statistics of China estimates the township's population now to be 11,213.
