= Minle, Jinggu County =

Minle Town 民乐镇
- Town
- Location in Yunnan.
- Coordinates: 23°41′32″N 100°29′24″E
- Country: People's Republic of China
- Province: Yunnan
- Prefecture-level city: Pu'er City
- Autonomous county: Jinggu Dai and Yi Autonomous County

Area
  - Total: 724.6 km^{2} (279.8 sq mi)

Population (2020)
  - Total: 26,423
  - Density: 36.47/km^{2} (94.45/sq mi)
- Time zone: UTC+08:00 (China Standard)
- Postal code: 666409
- Area code: 0879

Minle (simplified Chinese: 民乐镇; traditional Chinese: 民樂鎮; pinyin: Mínlè Zhèn) is a town in Jinggu Dai and Yi Autonomous County, Yunnan, China. As of the 2020 census it had a population of 26,423 and an area of 724.6-square-kilometre (279.8 sq mi). The town is known for Baijiu, white tea and Bletilla striata.

== Administrative division ==
As of 2016, the town is divided into nine villages:

- Baixiang (白象村)
- Minle (民乐村)
- Mangzhuan (芒专村)
- Wengkong (翁孔村)
- Dacun (大村村)
- Dahebian (大河边村)
- Gahu (嘎胡村)
- Taozishu (桃子树村)
- Xingmin (兴民村)

== Geography ==
The town is situated at northwestern Jinggu Dai and Yi Autonomous County. The town shares a border with Yongping Town and Lincang to the southwest, Jinggu Town and Weiyuan Town to the southeast, and Zhenyuan Yi, Hani and Lahu Autonomous County to the north, and Town to the south.

The highest point is Niujian Mountain (牛尖山), elevation 2,200 metres (7,200 ft). The lowest point is Xiyaozi (细腰子), which, at 880 metres (2,890 ft) above sea level.

The Minle River (民乐河) flows through the town.

== Economy ==
The town's economy is based on nearby mineral resources and agricultural resources. The region mainly produce corn, rice, and potato. The region abounds with copper. Economic crops are mainly sugarcane, Bletilla striata, tobacco, white tea, coffee, and natural rubber. Baijiu production is also valuable to the local economy.

== Demographics ==
Population census
Year	Pop.	±%
2004	22,950	—
2017	24,159	+5.3%
2020	26,423	+9.4%

As of 2020, the National Bureau of Statistics of China estimates the town's population now to be 26,423.

== Transportation ==
The County Road J32 winds through the town.
