= Jinggu =

Jinggu, may refer to:

- Jinggu Dai and Yi Autonomous County, an autonomous county in Yunnan, China
- Jinggu Town, a town in Jinggu Dai and Yi Autonomous County, Yunnan, China
