= Mengban Township =

Mengban Township 勐班乡
- Township
- Location in Yunnan.
- Coordinates: 23°06′33″N 100°21′23″E
- Country: People's Republic of China
- Province: Yunnan
- Prefecture-level city: Pu'er City
- Autonomous county: Jinggu Dai and Yi Autonomous County

Area
  - Total: 490.36 km^{2} (189.33 sq mi)
- Elevation: 1,150 m (3,770 ft)

Population (2020)
  - Total: 24,400
  - Density: 49.8/km^{2} (129/sq mi)
- Time zone: UTC+08:00 (China Standard)
- Postal code: 666404
- Area code: 0879

Mengban Township (simplified Chinese: 勐班乡; traditional Chinese: 勐班鄉; pinyin: Mèngbān Xiāng) is a township in Jinggu Dai and Yi Autonomous County, Yunnan, China. As of the 2020 census, it had a population of 24,400 and an area of 490.36-square-kilometre (189.33 sq mi).

== Administrative division ==
As of 2016, the town is divided into eight villages:

- Mengban (勐班村)
- Taiping (太平村)
- Anle (安乐村)
- Baluo (八落村)
- Qiangang (迁岗村)
- Manghai (芒海村)
- Jinli (金力村)
- Yanjiao (岩脚村)

== Geography ==
The township is situated at southwestern Jinggu Dai and Yi Autonomous County. The township shares a border with Banpo Township and Qianliu Yi Ethnic Township to the west, Yongping Town to the north, and Bi'an Township to the east and south.

The township is in the subtropical monsoon climate zone, with an average annual temperature of 20 °C (68 °F), total annual rainfall of 1,302-millimetre (51.3 in), a frost-free period of 350 days and annual average sunshine hours in 2065 hours.

The Lama Stream (腊马河) and Mogan Stream (磨杆河), both are tributaries of Lancang River, flow through the township.

== Economy ==
The main industries in and around the township are forestry and farming. Economic crops are mainly tea, sugarcane, and flax. The region also has an abundance of copper and zinc.

== Demographics ==
Population census
Year	Pop.	±%
2004	22,935	—
2020	24,400	+6.4%

As of 2020, the National Bureau of Statistics of China estimates the township's population now to be 24,400.
