= Yongping, Jinggu County =

Yongping Town 永平镇
- Town
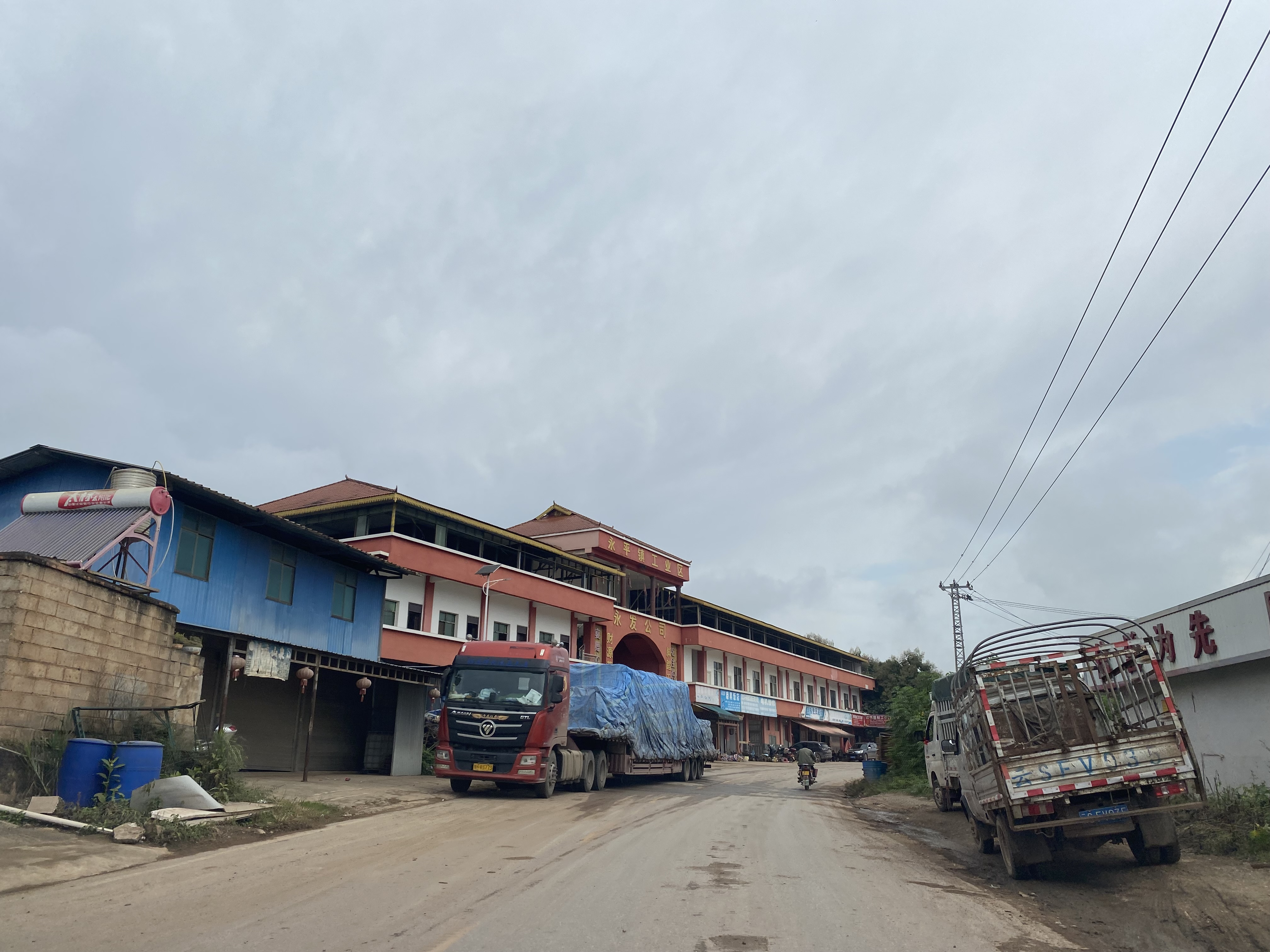

- Location in Yunnan.
- Coordinates: 23°24′53″N 100°23′32″E
- Country: People's Republic of China
- Province: Yunnan
- Prefecture-level city: Pu'er City
- Autonomous county: Jinggu Dai and Yi Autonomous County

Area
  - Total: 1,465.66 km^{2} (565.89 sq mi)
- Elevation: 1,110 m (3,640 ft)

Population (2020)
  - Total: 73,280
  - Density: 50.00/km^{2} (129.5/sq mi)
- Time zone: UTC+08:00 (China Standard)
- Postal code: 666401
- Area code: 0879

Yongping (simplified Chinese: 永平镇; traditional Chinese: 永平鎮; pinyin: Yǒngpíng Zhèn) is a town in Jinggu Dai and Yi Autonomous County, Yunnan, China. As of the 2020 census it had a population of 73,280 and an area of 1,465.66-square-kilometre (565.89 sq mi).

== Administrative division ==
As of 2016, the town is divided into one community and thirty villages:

- Tianyuan Community (田园社区)
- Mengga (勐嘎村)
- Tuanjie (团结村)
- Qianying (迁营村)
- Geilong (费竜村)
- Mangfei (芒费村)
- Mangla (芒腊村)
- Mangdong (芒东村)
- Qianmao (迁毛村)
- Qiannuo (迁糯村)
- Nangu (南谷村)
- Maomi (茂密村)
- Xi'e (昔俄村)
- Shuanglong (双龙村)
- Xintang (新塘村)
- Xincun (新村村)
- Zhongshan (钟山村)
- Xinghua (兴华村)
- Luolian (倮练村)
- Menglong (勐龙村)
- Jingmenkou (箐门口)
- Chahe (岔河村)
- Minghe (明河村)
- Pingjiang (平江村)
- Fulong (富龙村)
- Mangpa (芒帕村)
- Liu'an (柳安村)
- Waili (崴里村)
- Jinmu (金木村)
- Yongxing (永兴村)
- Yonghe (永和村)

== Geography ==
It lies at the southwestern of Jinggu Dai and Yi Autonomous County, bordering Shuangjiang Lahu, Va, Blang and Dai Autonomous County to the west, Mengban Township, Bi'an Township and Banpo Township to the south, Linxiang District to the north, and Minle Town, Yizhi Township and Weiyuan Town to the east.

The Mengga River (勐戛河), a tributary of Lancang River, flows through the town south to north.

The Ximuhe Reservoir (昔木河水库) is a vast reservoir in the town, which provides drinking water and water for irrigation. It has also become a place for recreation for nearby residents.

The town experiences a subtropical monsoon climate, with an average annual temperature of 18.77 °C (65.79 °F), total annual rainfall of 1,450-millimetre (57 in), and a frost-free period of 350 days.

== Economy ==
The region's economy is based on agriculture, forestry, animal husbandry, and tourism.

== Demographics ==
Population census
Year	Pop.	±%
2004	50,276	—
2017	71,679	+42.6%
2020	73,280	+2.2%

As of 2020, the National Bureau of Statistics of China estimates the town's population now to be 73,280.

== Tourist attractions ==
The town boasts many Buddhist temples, including Qiannuo Temple (迁糯佛寺), Leiguang Foji Temple (雷光佛迹寺), Hongwu Temple (洪武佛寺), and Mangdao Temple (芒岛佛寺).

The Panying Wenbi Pagoda (盘营文笔塔) is a popular attraction.

== Transportation ==
The County Road J35 passes across the town.

The China National Highway 323 passes across northern Yongping.
