= Yongping =

Yongping ("Yung-ping" in Wade–Giles romanization) may refer to:

== Locations ==
- Yongping County, a county in Yunnan, China
- Yongping Prefecture, a former prefecture of Beizhili in imperial China, now known as Lulong, Hebei
- Yongping Township (永坪乡), a township in Li County, Gansu, China
- Yongping, Jinggu County, a town in Jinggu Dai and Yi Autonomous County, Yunnan, China

== Historical eras ==
- Yongping (58–75), era name used by Emperor Ming of Han
- Yongping (291), era name used by Emperor Hui of Jin
- Yongping (508–512), era name used by Emperor Xuanwu of Northern Wei
- Yongping (617–618), era name used by Li Mi (Sui dynasty)
