= Weiyuan, Jinggu County =

Weiyuan Town 威远镇
- Town
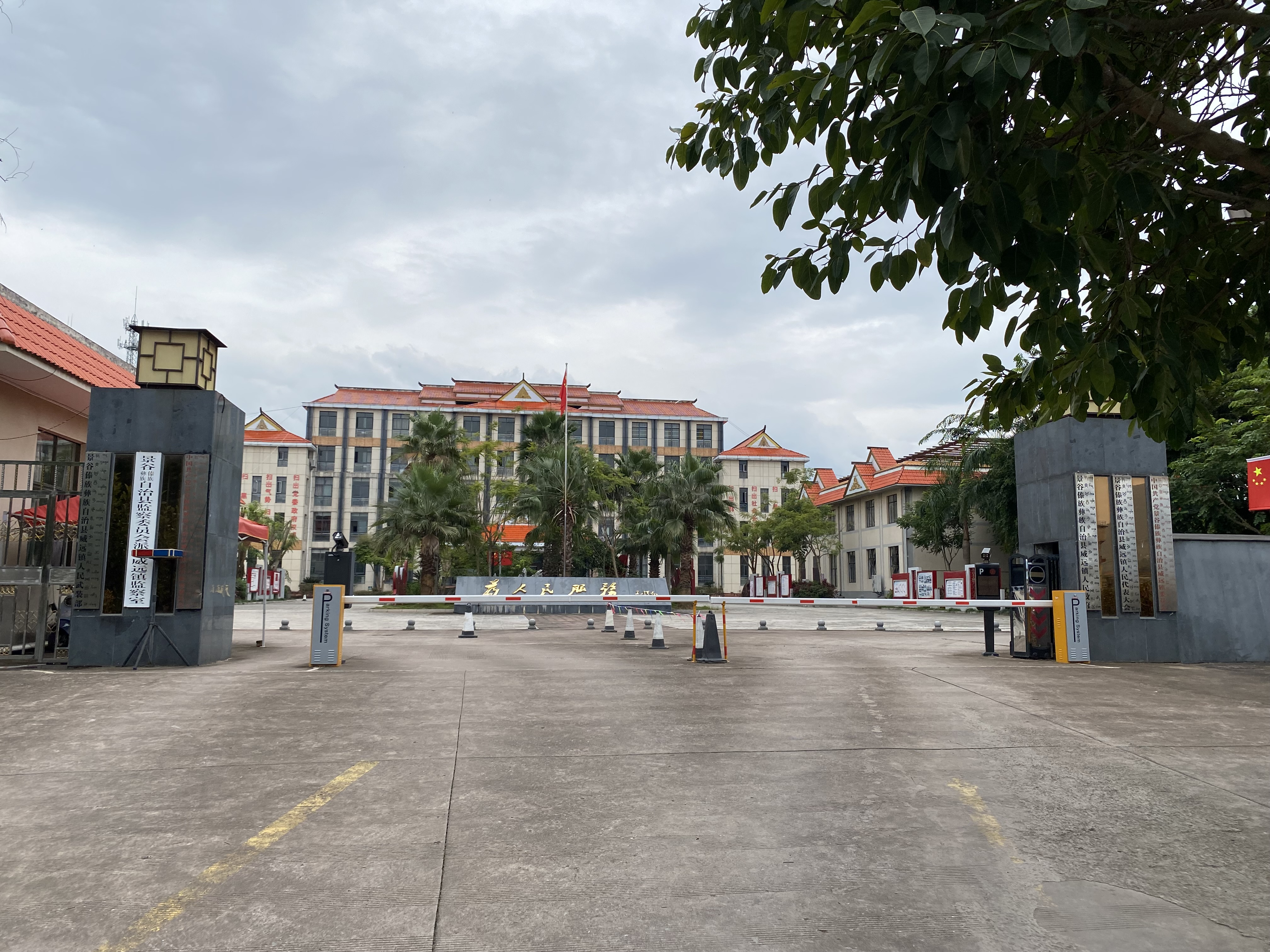
- Weiyuan Town Hall

- Location in Yunnan.
- Coordinates: 23°30′09″N 100°42′27″E
- Country: People's Republic of China
- Province: Yunnan
- Prefecture-level city: Pu'er City
- Autonomous county: Jinggu Dai and Yi Autonomous County

Area
  - Total: 1,127 km^{2} (435 sq mi)
- Elevation: 1,320 m (4,330 ft)

Population (2020)
  - Total: 82,289
  - Density: 73.02/km^{2} (189.1/sq mi)
- Time zone: UTC+08:00 (China Standard)
- Postal code: 666400
- Area code: 0879

Weiyuan (simplified Chinese: 威远镇; traditional Chinese: 威遠鎮; pinyin: Wēiyuǎn Zhèn) is a town in and the county seat of Jinggu Dai and Yi Autonomous County, Yunnan, China. As of the 2020 census it had a population of 82,289 and an area of 1,127-square-kilometre (435 sq mi). It is the political, economic, cultural and traffic center of Jinggu Dai and Yi Autonomous County. It is known as "Hometown of Mango".

== Administrative division ==
As of 2016, the town is divided into four communities and twenty-two villages:

- Weiyuan Community (威远社区)
- Mangxiang Community (杧乡社区)
- Bailong Community (白龙社区)
- Fenggang Community (凤岗社区)
- Mangmao (芒冒村)
- Weiyuanjie (威远街村)
- Xinmin (新民村)
- Minli (民利村)
- Jiangdong (江东村)
- Nanjing (南景村)
- Gonglang (公榔村)
- Hedong (河东村)
- Longtang (龙塘村)
- Lianhe (联合村)
- Yunhai (云海村)
- Wenlang (文朗村)
- Xiangyan (香盐村)
- Yong'an (永安村)
- Naka (那卡村)
- Lianqi (联齐村)
- Xinping (新平村)
- Keli (课里村)
- Nuanli (暖里村)
- Xungang (训岗村)
- Wenhui (文会村)
- Qianjia (钱家村)

== History ==
In February 2006, former Zhongshan Township (钟山乡) was merged into Weiyuan.

== Geography ==
It lies at the eastern part of Jinggu Dai and Yi Autonomous County, bordering Yongping Town to the west, Yizhi Township and Zhengxing Town to the south, Fengshan Town and Jinggu Town to the north, and Zhengxing Town to the east.

There are two rivers in the town, the Jinggu River (景谷河) and Weiyuan River (威远江).

== Economy ==
The region's economy is based on agriculture, animal husbandry, aquaculture, and commerce. The region mainly produce rice. Sugarcane, tobacco, tea, coffee, fruit, vegetable are the economic plants of this region.

== Demographics ==
Population census
Year	Pop.	±%
2004	25,565	—
2017	100,096	+291.5%
2020	82,289	−17.8%

As of 2020, the National Bureau of Statistics of China estimates the town's population now to be 82,289.

== Tourist attractions ==
The Dazhai Temple (大寨总佛寺) and Dongna Temple (东那佛寺) are Buddhist temples in the town.

== Transportation ==
The town is connected to two highways: the China National Highway 323 and Provincial Highway S222. The China National Highway G323 runs east–west just central of the town. The Provincial Highway S222 starts from the town and goes north.
