= Fengshan, Jinggu County =

Fengshan Town 凤山镇
- Town
- Location in Yunnan.
- Coordinates: 23°40′44″N 100°47′40″E
- Country: People's Republic of China
- Province: Yunnan
- Prefecture-level city: Pu'er City
- Autonomous county: Jinggu Dai and Yi Autonomous County
- Incorporated (township): 1988

Area
  - Total: 520.6 km^{2} (201.0 sq mi)

Population (2020)
  - Total: 21,752
  - Density: 41.78/km^{2} (108.2/sq mi)
- Time zone: UTC+08:00 (China Standard)
- Postal code: 666401
- Area code: 0879

Fengshan (simplified Chinese: 凤山镇; traditional Chinese: 鳳山鎮; pinyin: Fèngshān Zhèn) is a town in Jinggu Dai and Yi Autonomous County, Yunnan, China. As of the 2017 census it had a population of 21,752 and an area of 520.6-square-kilometre (201.0 sq mi).

== Administrative division ==
As of 2016, the town is divided into twelve villages:

- Manglong (芒竜村)
- Pingzhai (平寨村)
- Bailin (柏林村)
- Wenzhu (文竹村)
- Wenshao (文绍村)
- Baomu (抱母村)
- Wenhai (文海村)
- Wenzhe (文折村)
- Shunnan (顺南村)
- Banban (南板村)
- Pingtian (平田村)
- Haiqing (海庆村)

== History ==
In 1725, in the ruling of Yongzheng Emperor the Qing dynasty (1644–1911), it came under the jurisdiction of Xuanhua Tusi (宣化土司). In 1774, in the reign of Qianlong Emperor, the Weiyuan Department (威远厅) was set up.

After the founding of the Republic of China (1912-1949), in 1913, it belonged to the Xuanhua Township (宣化乡) of Weiyuan County (威远县). On September 30, 1940, its name was changed to "Fengshan District" (凤山区) and then renamed "Fengshan Township" (凤山乡) in the following year.

On August 1, 1949, the Provisional People's Government of Fengshan District (凤山区临时人民政府) was established. In 1952, it was renamed "Fengshan Township". During the Great Leap Forward, it was renamed "Fengshan People's Commune" (凤山人民公社) in October 1958. It was incorporated as a township in January 1988.

== Geography ==
The town is located in northeastern Jinggu Dai and Yi Autonomous County. It is surrounded by Zhenyuan Yi, Hani and Lahu Autonomous County on the northwest, Jinggu Town on the west, Pu'er City on the east, and the towns of Zhengxing and Weiyuan on the south.

The highest point is Dajian Mountain (大尖山), elevation 2,527 metres (8,291 ft). The lowest point is Mangka in the village of Pingzhai (平寨村芒卡), which, at 950 metres (3,120 ft) above sea level.

The Weiyuan River (威远江) flows through the town.

The town enjoys a subtropical monsoon climate, with an average annual temperature of 16.1 to 18.5 °C (61.0 to 65.3 °F), total annual rainfall of 850-to-1,250-millimetre (33 to 49 in), a frost-free period of 300 days and annual average sunshine hours in 2028 hours.

== Economy ==
The region's economy is based on agriculture and animal husbandry. Significant crops include rice, wheat, corn, and bean. Economic crops are mainly sugarcane, tobacco, tea, coffee, fruit, vegetable, natural rubber, and Juglans sigillata. The region also has an abundance of copper and iron.

== Demographics ==
Population census
Year	Pop.	±%
2004	21,288	—
2020	21,752	+2.2%

As of 2020, the National Bureau of Statistics of China estimates the town's population now to be 21,752.

== Tourist attractions ==
Fengshan is a favourite tourist destination, especially renowned for its hot spring.

== Transportation ==
The Provincial Highway S222 is a north–south highway in the town.
