= Weiyuan General Cannon =

Historical Chinese weapon

- Chinese: 威远将军炮
- Founded: 1690
- Founder: Dai Zi
- National origin: Qing Dynasty
- Named by: Kangxi Emperor

Weiyuan General Cannon (simplified Chinese: 威远将军炮; traditional Chinese: 威遠將軍炮), also known as "Weiyuan General Gun" or "Divine Invincible Great General Cannon," was a large-caliber, short-barreled front-mounted mortar manufactured in the 29th year of Kangxi's reign during the Qing Dynasty (1690).

Weiyuan General Cannon was first developed by Ferdinand Verbiest, but eventually failed, and was later developed successfully by Dai Zi (戴梓), a firearms maker in the early Qing Dynasty.

== Specifications ==
Weiyuan General Cannon, made of bronze, had a caliber of 212 mm, a length of 69 cm, and weighed 280 kg.

== History ==
At the beginning of the Qing Dynasty, the Dzungar nobles, supported by Tsarist Russia, launched a large-scale rebellion. In order to quell this rebellion, the Kangxi Emperor ordered the manufacture of firearms. Verbiest accepted the task of making cannons, he spent a year but failed to build it. Then, Dai Zi built the cannon in eight days (another way of saying eight months). Kangxi was so happy about this that he led all ministers to try it out themselves, and then named the cannon "Weiyuan General Cannon".

== Usages ==
Weiyuan General Cannon played an important role in the Dzungar–Qing Wars, and the Qing army's several battles against enemies.

== See also ==
- Hongyipao
- Divine Invincible Great General Cannon
