= China National Highway 323 =

Road in China

National Highway 323
- 323国道

Route information
- Length: 8,915 km (5,540 mi)

Major junctions
- From: Ruijin, Jiangxi
- To: Lincang, Yunnan

Location
- Country: China

Highway system
- National Trunk Highway System; Primary; Auxiliary
← G322	→ G324

China National Highway 323 (G323), also named the "Ruijin - Qingshuihe Highway" (Ruiqing Line in short), is a national highway in China. It runs southwest from Ruijin, Jiangxi, passing Guangdong Province, Guangxi Province, and eventually ending in Lincang, Yunnan, on China-Myanmar border. It measures 2,915 kilometers in length.

Kokudou G323 (China)

China Highway G323

== History ==
The highway roughly follows the same path as the Red Army had during the Long March of 1934~1935. In fact, the western end of the highway was set in Ruijin just to commemorate this event.

== Route and distance ==
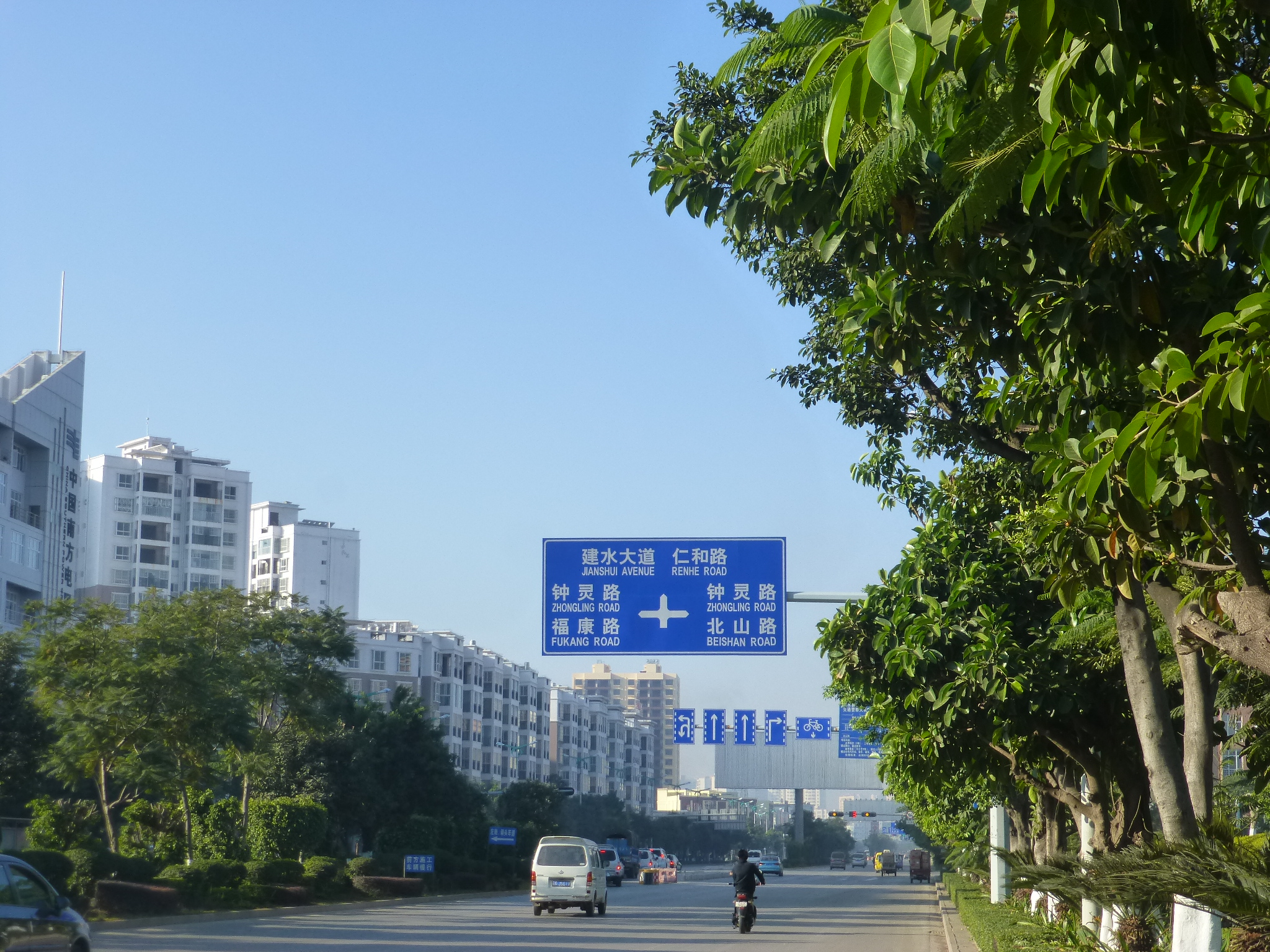
G323 crossing Lin'an Town, the county seat of Jianshui County, as one of its main streets (Jianshui Ave)

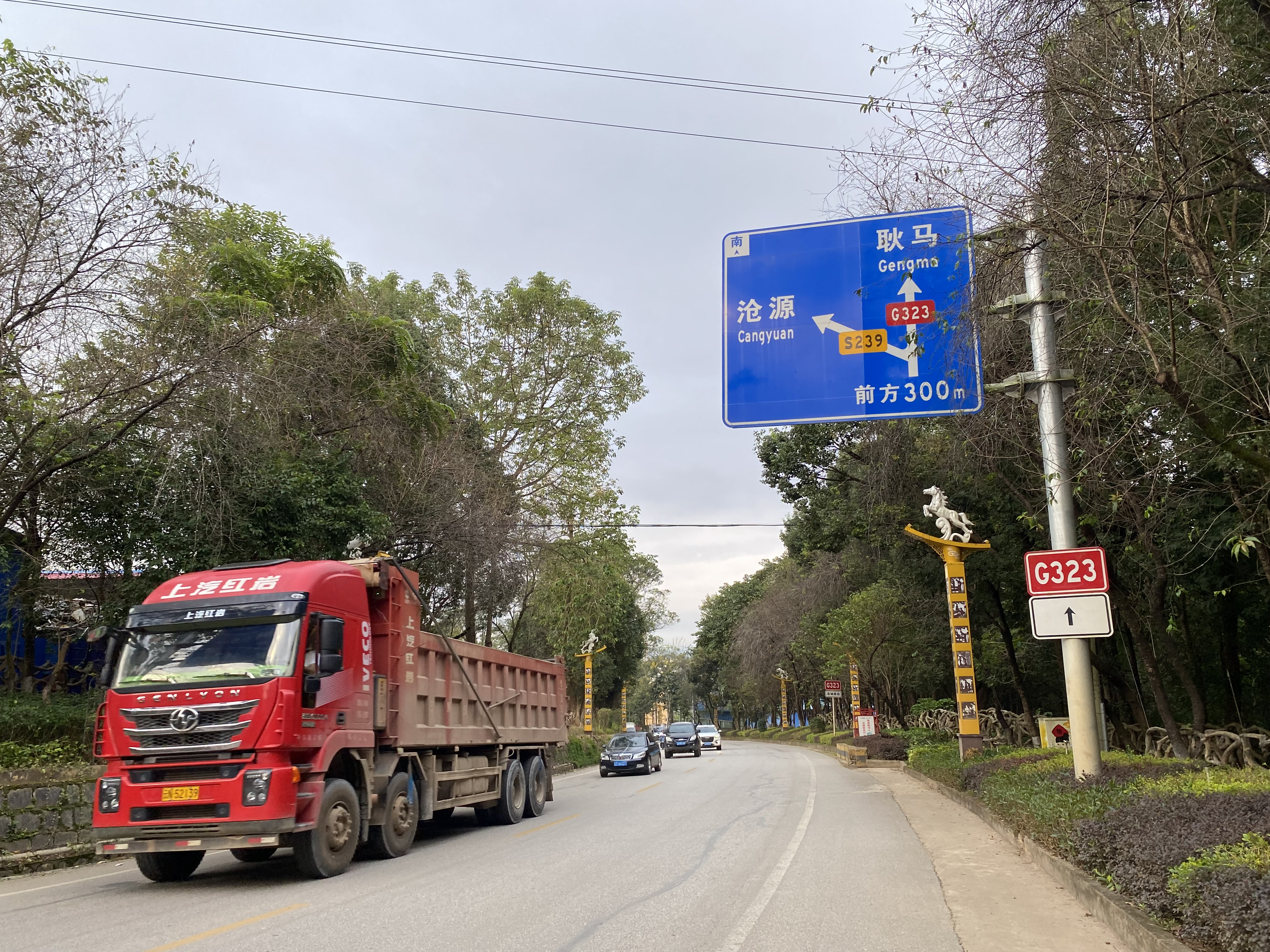
G323 crossing Gengma Dai and Va Autonomous County

Route and distance

City	Distance (km)
Ruijin, Jiangxi	0
Yudu County, Jiangxi	81
Gan County, Jiangxi	137
Ganzhou, Jiangxi	146
Nankang, Jiangxi	177
Dayu County, Jiangxi	230
Nanxiong, Guangdong	271
Shixing County, Guangdong	309
Shaoguan, Guangdong	372
Ruyuan Yao Autonomous County, Guangdong	410
Lianzhou, Guangdong	574
Liannan, Guangdong	587
Lianshan, Guangdong	625
Hezhou, Guangxi	722
Zhongshan County, Guangxi	761
Pingle, Guangxi	847
Lipu County, Guangxi	882
Luzhai, Guangxi	979
Liuzhou, Guangxi	1023
Liujiang, Guangxi	1034
Datang, Guangxi	1082
Yizhou, Guangxi	1145
Hechi, Guangxi	1219
Donglan, Guangxi	1356
Bama County, Guangxi	1438
Tianyang, Guangxi	1521
Baise, Guangxi	1560
Funing County, Yunnan	1735
Yanshan, Yunnan	1934
Kaiyuan, Yunnan	2094
Jianshui, Yunnan	2181
Shiping, Yunnan	2239
Yuanjiang, Yunnan	2382
Mojiang, Yunnan	2457
Pu'er, Yunnan	2618
Jinggu, Yunnan	2731
Lincang, Yunnan	2915

== See also ==
- China National Highways
