= Jinggu Town =

Jinggu Town 景谷镇
- Town
- Location in Yunnan.
- Coordinates: 23°44′23″N 100°37′21″E
- Country: People's Republic of China
- Province: Yunnan
- Prefecture-level city: Pu'er City
- Autonomous county: Jinggu Dai and Yi Autonomous County

Area
  - Total: 263.5 km^{2} (101.7 sq mi)

Population (2004)
  - Total: 16,991
  - Density: 64.48/km^{2} (167.0/sq mi)
- Time zone: UTC+08:00 (China Standard)
- Postal code: 666411
- Area code: 0879

Jinggu (simplified Chinese: 景谷镇; traditional Chinese: 景谷鎮; pinyin: Jǐnggǔ Zhèn) is a town in Jinggu Dai and Yi Autonomous County, Yunnan, China. As of the 2004 census it had a population of 16,991 and an area of 263.5-square-kilometre (101.7 sq mi). It is known as "Home of Tea" (茶叶之乡).

== Administrative division ==
As of 2016, the town is divided into nine villages:

- Jinggu (景谷村)
- Yunpan (云盘村)
- Wenxing (文杏村)
- Wendong (文东村)
- Tuanshan (团山村)
- Wenlian (文联村)
- Wenzhao (文召村)
- Wenshan (文山村)
- Xiangshui (响水村)

== History ==
It was incorporated as a township in 1988. In June 2013 it was upgraded to a town. In August 2013, it was listed among the second batch of "List of Chinese Traditional Villages" by the State Council of China.

== Geography ==
The town is situated at northern Jinggu Dai and Yi Autonomous County. The town is bordered to the north by Zhenyuan Yi, Hani and Lahu Autonomous County, to the east by Fengshan Town, to the south by Weiyuan Town, and to the west by Minle Town.

The Jinggu River (景谷河) flows through the town south to north.

The Jinggu Reservoir (景谷水库) is a vast reservoir in the town, which provides drinking water and water for irrigation.

== Economy ==
The economy of the province is strongly based on agriculture, including farming and pig-breeding. The main crops are rice, wheat, corn, potato and vegetable. Commercial crops include tea and tobacco.

== Demographics ==
Population census
Year	Pop.	±%
2004	16,991	—

As of 2004, the National Bureau of Statistics of China estimates the town's population now to be 16,991.

== Tourist attractions ==
The town enjoys rich tourist resources, the popular natural scenic spot is the Jinggu Reservoir. The Tea-horse Ancient Road is a popular attraction.

Dashi Temple (大石寺) is a Taoist temple in the town. It was originally built in 1856, in the Xianfeng era of the late Qing dynasty (1644–1911). New it is a provincial cultural relic preservation organ.

== Transportation ==
The town is crossed by Provincial Highway S222.
