= Divine Invincible Great General Cannon =

- Chinese: 神威无敌大将军炮
- National origin: Qing dynasty
- Introduction: 1676
- Founder: Nan Huairen
- Named by: Kangxi Emperor
- Used by: Qing army
- Wars: Sino-Russian border conflicts
- Status: Decommissioned

Divine Invincible Great General Cannon, also known as "Weiyuan General Cannon" (simplified Chinese: 神威无敌大将军炮; traditional Chinese: 神威無敵大將軍炮), was a type of long-barreled heavy artillery in the Qing Dynasty, built by Ferdinand Verbiest, a Flemish Jesuit missionary in China, in the 15th year of Kangxi (1676).

Divine Invincible Great General Cannon was named by the Kangxi Emperor. The Divine Invincible Great General Cannon was made of bronze, there were 52 cannons in total.

== Specifications ==
Divine Invincible Great General Cannon weighed from 2,000 catty to 3,000 catty, and is from 7 Chinese feet 3 Chinese inches to 8 Chinese feet long.

== Usage ==
In 1685, the Qing army used eight Divine Invincible Great General Cannons against the invading Russian army, and these cannons played an important role in the Battle of Yaksa (雅克萨战役). The Qing Empire won the battle and signed the Treaty of Nerchinsk with the Tsardom of Russia.

== Discovery ==
In May 1975, the workers of Qiqihar Jianhua Machinery Factory (齐齐哈尔建华机械厂) found a Divine Invincible Great General Cannon used by the Qing army in the Battle of Yaksa.
