= Ning'er Hani and Yi Autonomous County =

Ning'er County 宁洱县
- Autonomous county
- 宁洱哈尼族彝族自治县; Ning'er Hani and Yi Autonomous County
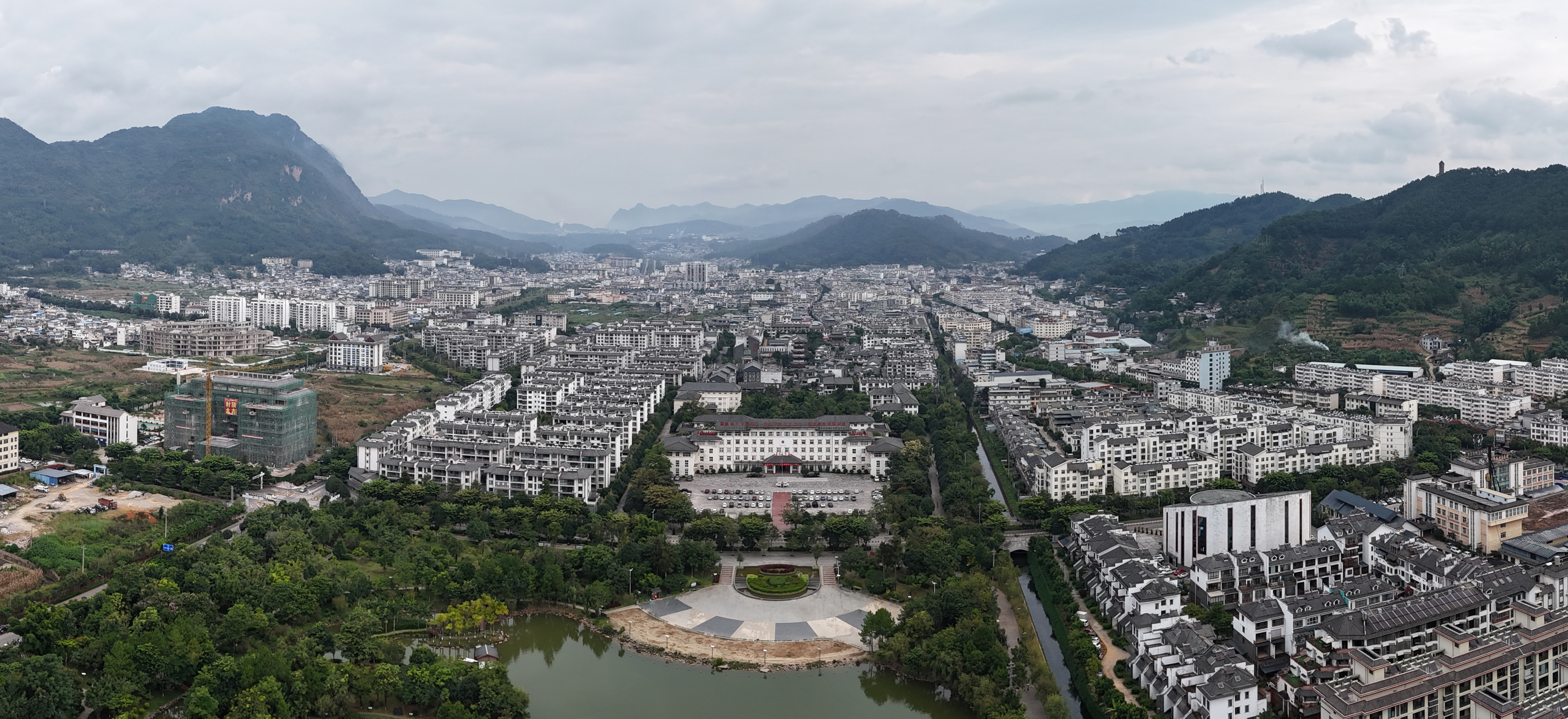
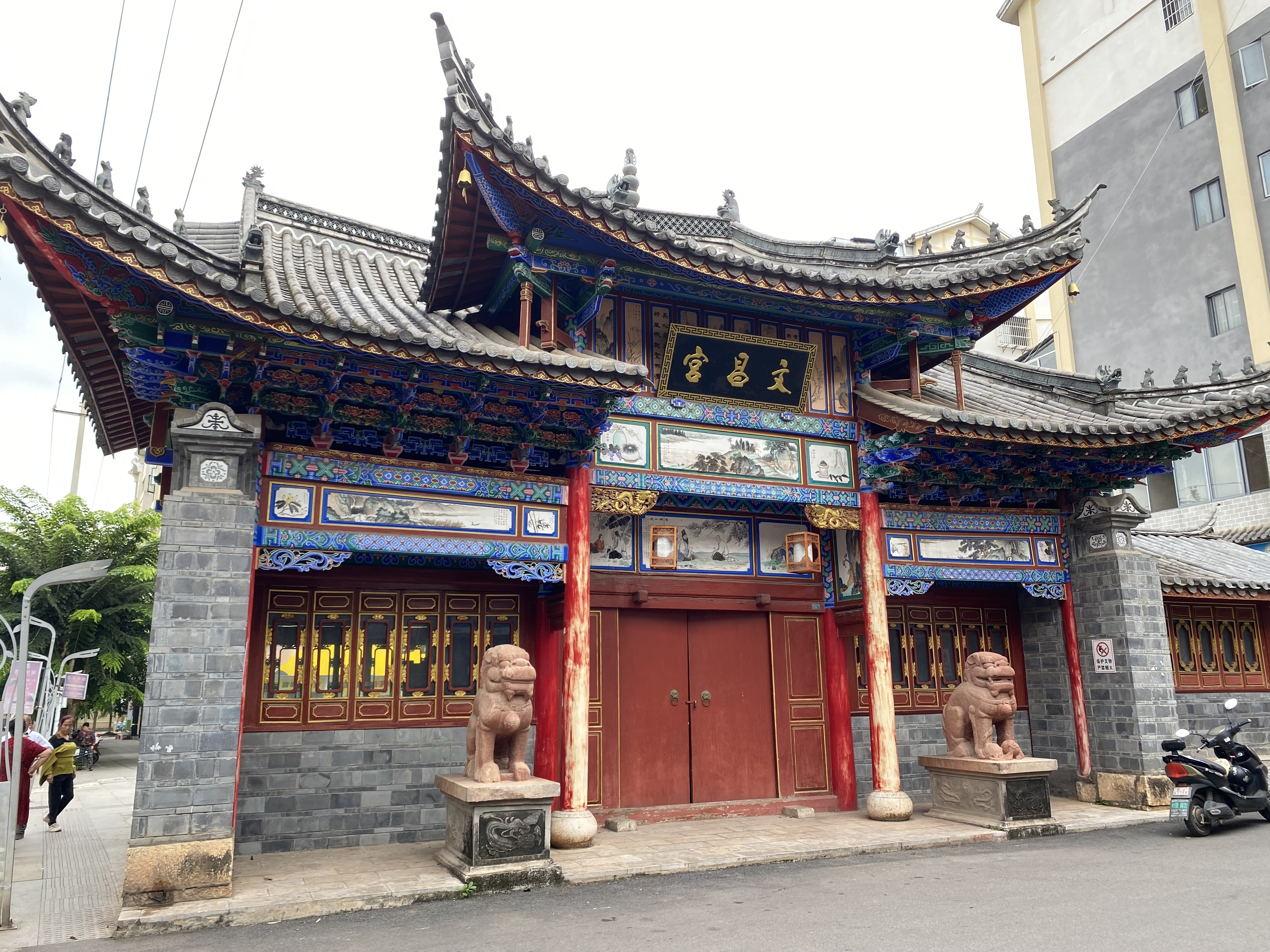
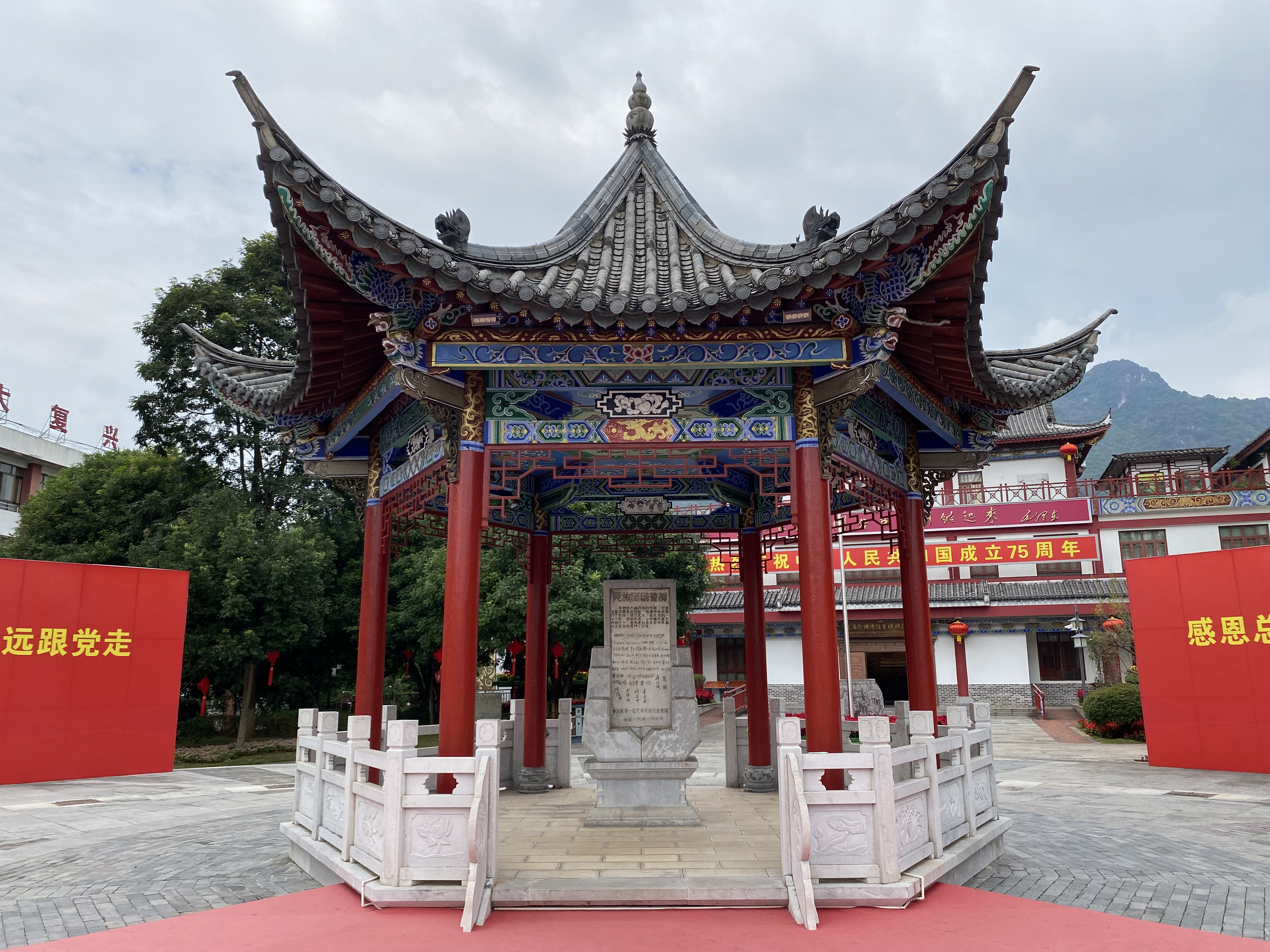
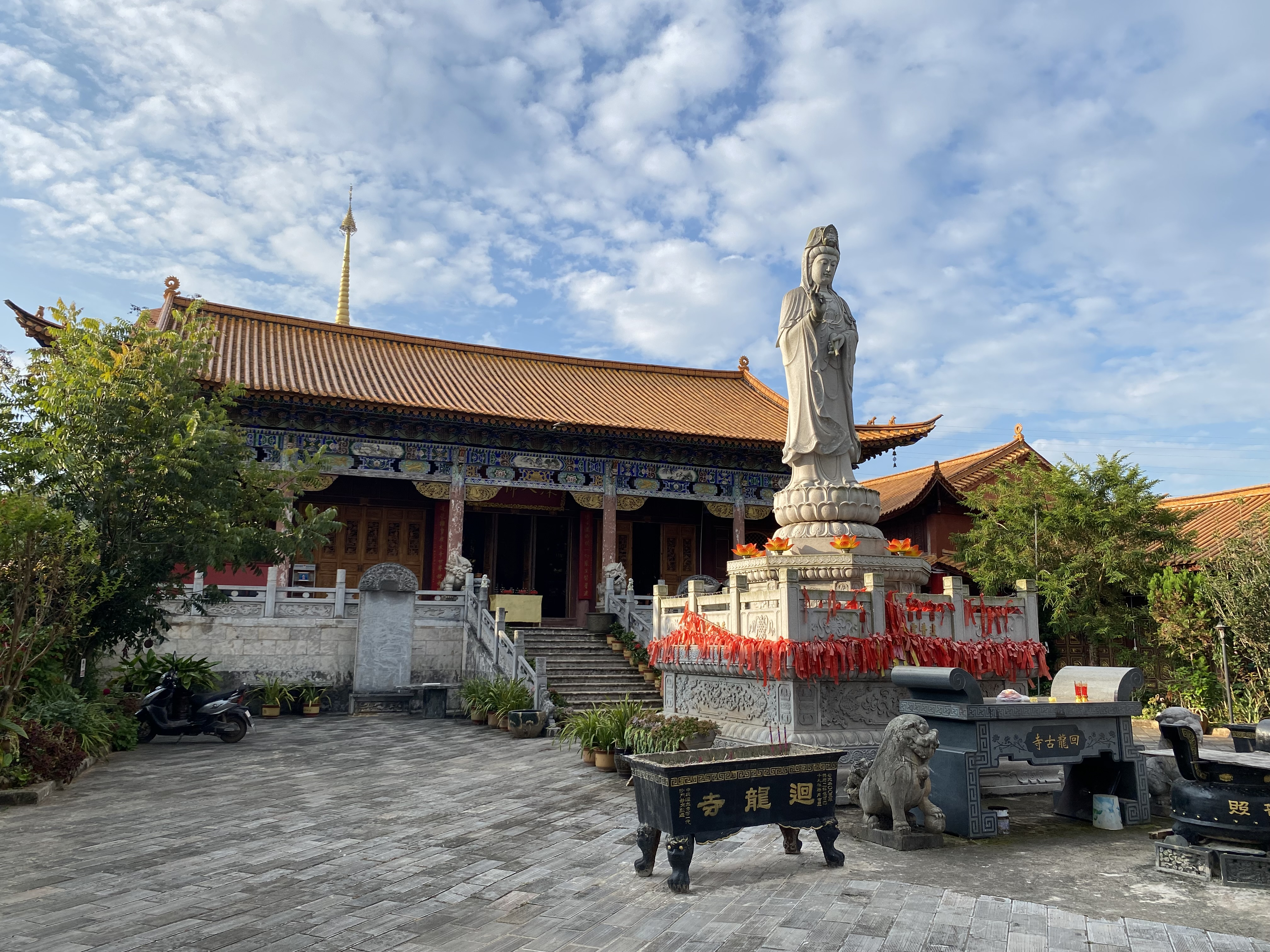
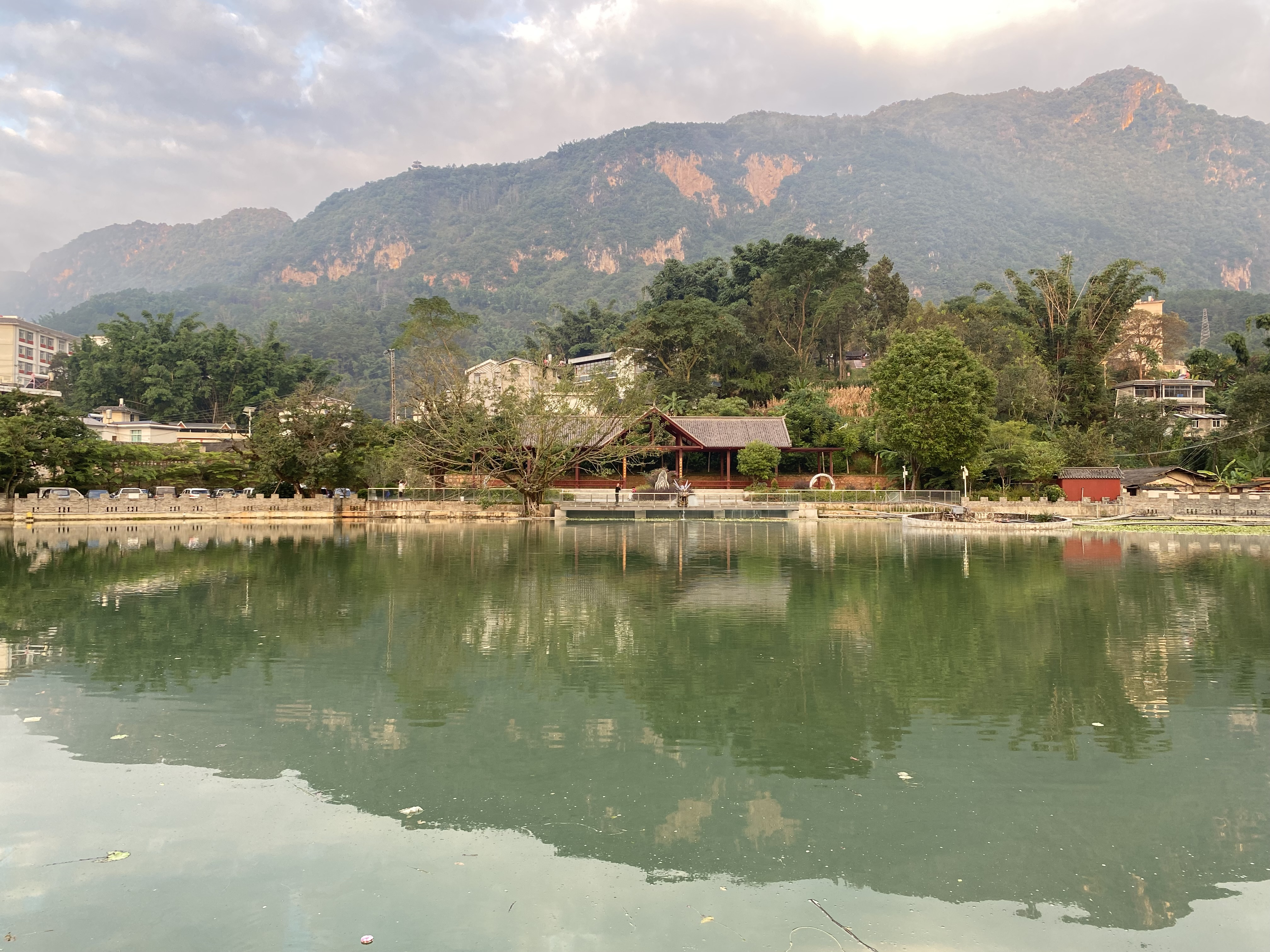
- Cityscape of county town Wenchang Palace Monument to the National Unity Oath Huilong Temple Longtan Park

- Location of Ning'er County (red) and Pu'er City (pink) within Yunnan

- Location of the seat in Yunnan
- Coordinates: 23°02′53″N 101°02′46″E
- Country: China
- Province: Yunnan
- Prefecture-level city: Pu'er
- GB/T 2260 CODE: 530821
- County seat: Ning'er

Area
  - Total: 3,670 km^{2} (1,420 sq mi)

Population (2020 census)
  - Total: 162,711
  - Density: 44.3/km^{2} (115/sq mi)
- Time zone: UTC+8 (China Standard Time)
- Postal code: 665100
- Area code: 0879
- Website: www.ne.gov.cn
- ^{1}Yunnan Statistics Bureau^{2}Puer Gov.^{3}Yunnan Portal

Ning'er Hani and Yi Autonomous County
- Traditional Chinese: 寧洱哈尼族彝族自治縣
- Simplified Chinese: 宁洱哈尼族彝族自治县
Transcriptions
Standard Mandarin
- Hanyu Pinyin: Níng'ěr Hānízú Yízú Zìzhìxiàn

The Ning'er Hani and Yi Autonomous County is an autonomous county under the jurisdiction of Pu'er City in the south of Yunnan Province, China. It is in the center of Pu'er City and borders Mojiang County across the Babian River to the east and northeast, Simao District and Jiangcheng County to the south, Jinggu County across the Xiaohei River to the west, and Zhenyuan County to the north.

== Name ==
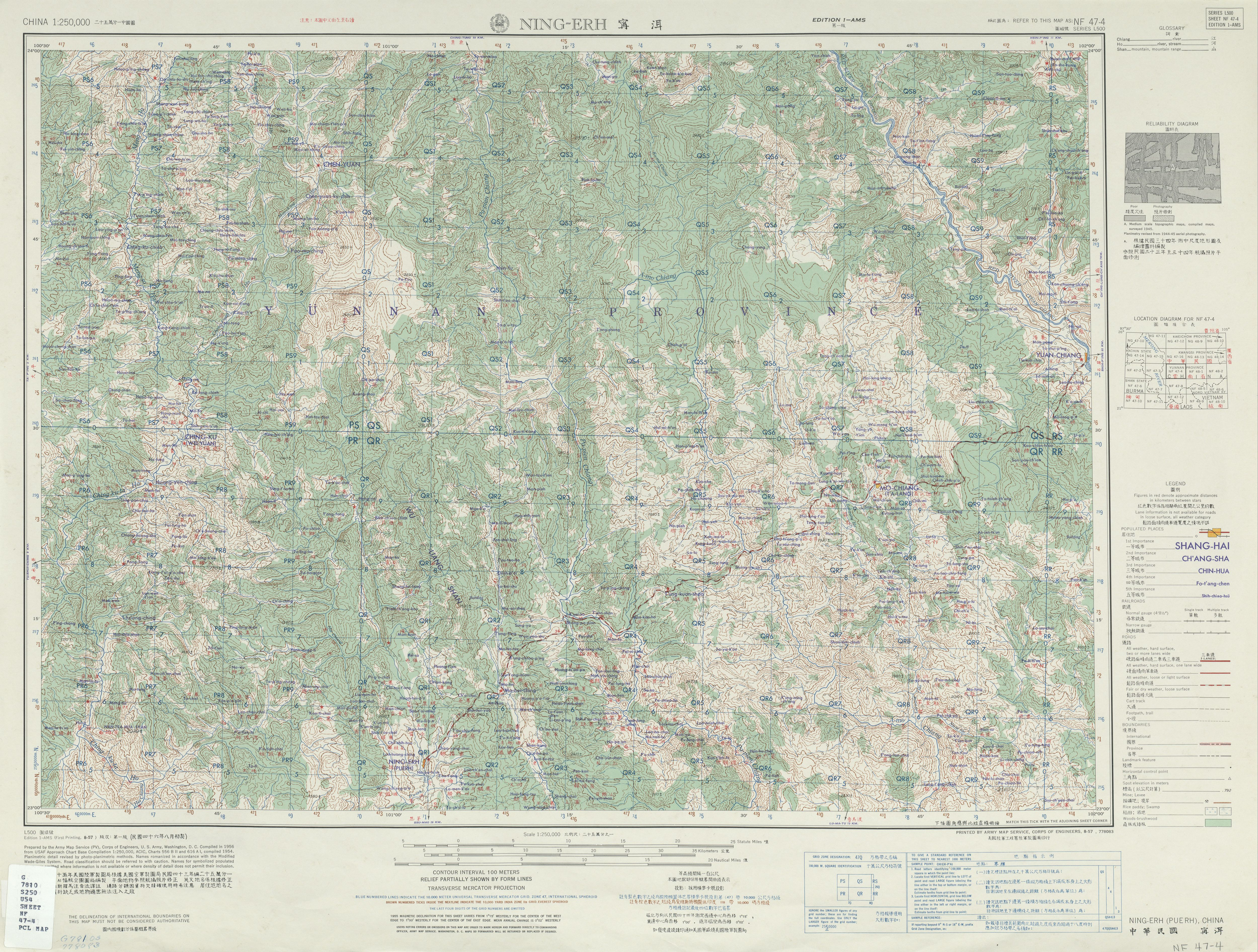
Ning'er (labelled as NING-ERH (PUERH) 甯洱) (1956)

The county was formerly named Pu'er. When Simao changed its name to Pu'er in 2007, the county's name was changed to Ning'er for clarity.

== Administrative divisions ==
In the present, Ning'er Hani and Yi Autonomous County has 6 towns and 3 townships.

6 towns

- Ning'er (宁洱镇)
- Mohei (磨黑镇)
- Dehua (德化镇)
- Tongxin (同心镇)
- Mengxian (勐先镇)
- Meizi (梅子镇)

3 townships

- De'an (德安乡)
- Puyi (普义乡)
- Liming (黎明乡)

== Demography ==
The population of the county has a large proportion of native Hani and Yi people in a predominantly Han Chinese population. As of 2003 the county records a population of approximately 190,000 people.

Ethnic Bai (population: 5,139) are found in Kesa 克洒, Heping village 和平村, Mengxian township 勐先乡 (Pu'er County Gazetteer 1993:120).

The Datou 达头 people number 254 persons and are found in Ning'er County and Simao City. They consider themselves to be ethnic Yi, and also speak a Yi language (You 2013:133).

== Climate ==
Climate data for Ning'er, elevation 1,337 m (4,386 ft), (1991–2020 normals, extremes 1991–present)
Month	Jan	Feb	Mar	Apr	May	Jun	Jul	Aug	Sep	Oct	Nov	Dec	Year
Record high °C (°F)	27.6 (81.7)	29.3 (84.7)	32.7 (90.9)	32.2 (90.0)	35.5 (95.9)	33.5 (92.3)	32.6 (90.7)	32.2 (90.0)	32.5 (90.5)	30.1 (86.2)	28.6 (83.5)	27.1 (80.8)	35.5 (95.9)
Mean daily maximum °C (°F)	21.0 (69.8)	23.3 (73.9)	26.3 (79.3)	28.1 (82.6)	28.3 (82.9)	27.9 (82.2)	27.1 (80.8)	27.4 (81.3)	26.9 (80.4)	25.1 (77.2)	23.0 (73.4)	20.6 (69.1)	25.4 (77.7)
Daily mean °C (°F)	12.7 (54.9)	14.4 (57.9)	17.6 (63.7)	20.1 (68.2)	21.8 (71.2)	22.7 (72.9)	22.3 (72.1)	22.2 (72.0)	21.3 (70.3)	19.3 (66.7)	16.0 (60.8)	13.1 (55.6)	18.6 (65.5)
Mean daily minimum °C (°F)	7.3 (45.1)	7.8 (46.0)	10.8 (51.4)	14.0 (57.2)	17.1 (62.8)	19.5 (67.1)	19.7 (67.5)	19.5 (67.1)	18.5 (65.3)	16.3 (61.3)	12.1 (53.8)	8.9 (48.0)	14.3 (57.7)
Record low °C (°F)	1.1 (34.0)	1.8 (35.2)	4.7 (40.5)	8.1 (46.6)	10.7 (51.3)	11.7 (53.1)	17.0 (62.6)	15.2 (59.4)	8.8 (47.8)	9.5 (49.1)	1.9 (35.4)	−1.4 (29.5)	−1.4 (29.5)
Average precipitation mm (inches)	28.1 (1.11)	17.0 (0.67)	29.4 (1.16)	54.7 (2.15)	145.5 (5.73)	215.7 (8.49)	292.1 (11.50)	283.7 (11.17)	173.2 (6.82)	133.2 (5.24)	51.4 (2.02)	21.5 (0.85)	1,445.5 (56.91)
Average precipitation days (≥ 0.1 mm)	4.9	3.3	5.1	9.7	15.3	21.6	25.8	24.3	19.6	15.2	6.5	4.9	156.2
Average relative humidity (%)	77	69	63	66	74	82	86	85	84	84	82	81	78
Mean monthly sunshine hours	214.7	230.4	250.2	247.6	217.5	151.6	114.9	135.8	137.4	143.9	172.5	176.0	2,192.5
Percentage possible sunshine	64	71	67	65	53	38	28	34	38	40	53	53	50
Source: China Meteorological Administration All-time Nov Record low

== Transport ==
- China National Highway 213
