= Simao, Pu'er =

Simao 思茅区
- District
- Location of Simao District (red) and Pu'er Prefecture (pink) within Yunnan province of China

- Location in Yunnan Simao (China)
- Coordinates: 22°46′51″N 100°58′30″E
- Country: China
- Province: Yunnan
- Prefecture-level city: Pu'er
- GB/T 2260 CODE: 530802
- Township divisions: 7
- District seat: Simao Subdistrict

Area
  - Total: 3,928 km^{2} (1,517 sq mi)
- Elevation: 1,370.9 m (4,498 ft)

Population (2020 census)
  - Total: 416,188
  - Density: 106.0/km^{2} (274.4/sq mi)
- Time zone: UTC+8 (China Standard Time)
- Postal code: 665000
- Area code: 0879
- Website: www.smqzf.gov.cn
- ^{1}Yunnan Statistics Bureau^{2}Puer Gov.^{3}Yunnan Portal

Simao, Pu'er

Simao
- Chinese: 思茅
- Postal: Szumao
Transcriptions
Standard Mandarin
- Hanyu Pinyin: Sīmáo
- Wade–Giles: Szu^{1}-mao^{2}

Simao District (Chinese: 思茅区; pinyin: Sīmáo Qū; formerly known as Cuiyun District) is a district under the jurisdiction of Pu'er City, Yunnan Province, China. It is the seat of Pu'er Prefecture. Formerly both Simao and the surrounding region of Pu'er prefecture played a major role in the historic Tea Horse Road trade between Yunnan, Tibet and India, with Simao acting as the southern terminus or starting point for the transport of tea by mule caravan north to Dali, Lijiang and Lhasa. Tea remains a central crop and product of the region.

== Geography ==
Simao District is located in the south-central part of Pu'er City in southern Yunnan and borders Jiangcheng County to the east, Lancang County and Jinggu County to the west, Jinghong and Menghai County to the south and Ning'er County to the north.

== Administrative divisions ==
Simao District has 1 subdistrict, 4 towns and 2 ethnic townships.

1 subdistrict

- Simao Subdistrict (思茅街道)

4 towns

- Nanping (南屏镇)
- Yixiang (倚象镇)
- Simaogang (思茅港镇)
- Liushun (六顺镇)

2 ethnic townships

- Longtan Yi and Dai Ethnic Township (龙潭彝族傣族乡)
- Yunxian Yi Ethnic Township (云仙彝族乡)

== Ethnic groups ==
Simao District is ethnically diverse, with Han, Yi, Dai, Hani, Bulang, Wa, Lahu, and other ethnic groups.

Han Chinese live mostly in Simaoba 思茅坝, Yixiangba 倚象坝, and Laojuntian 老君田 (Simao Prefecture Almanac 1993:477). They numbered 105,133 people as of 1990, making more up than 75% of the population.

The Yi people of Gaojiazhai 髙家寨 and Manxieba 曼歇坝 in Simaoba 思茅坝 speak the Southern Yi dialect (南部方言), while the Yi of other areas speak the Western Yi dialect of Weishan County (滇西巍山彝族西部方言) (Simao Prefecture Almanac 1993:478). They numbered 17,459 people as of 1990. Ethnic Yi townships in Simao district are Longtan 龙潭彝族傣族乡 and Yunxian 云仙彝族乡 townships. Some of the Yi in Simao are also known as Xiangtang 香堂.

The Dai people live in various villages on both sides of the Dazhong 大中河, Jiufang 酒房河, and Xiaohejiang 小黑江 rivers, namely Mangdie 芒垒, Mangyao 芒腰, Mangpan 芒畔, Qianluo 迁洛, Jiufang 酒房, Longtan 龙潭彝族傣族乡, Zhengwan 整碗, Mamu 骂木, Bangnong 蚌弄, Boluo 菠萝, and other villages (Simao Prefecture Almanac 1993:478). They numbered 4,142 people as of 1990.

The Hani people live in (Simao Prefecture Almanac 1993:478). They numbered 3,722 people as of 1990. Some migrated from Tongxin 同心 and Mengxian 勐先 of Pu'er County 普洱县 (now renamed as Ning'er Hani and Yi Autonomous County) during the Republic of China era, while others migrated in 1971 from Lianhe 联合, Xin'an 新安, Xinfu 新抚, and Baliu 坝溜 townships of Mojiang County 墨江县. Subgroups include Biyue 碧约, Budu 布都, Kaduo 卡堕, Ximoluo 西摩洛, and Bukong 布孔.

In Simao District, the Bulang people (population 272 as of 1990) live near the junction of the Xiaohei River 小黑江 and Lancang River 澜沧江, in the villages of Guanzhai 官寨, Tuanliangzi 团梁子, Mangbang 芒蚌, Mangba 芒坝, etc., in a total of six villages (Simao Prefecture Almanac 1993:480).

The Wa people live alongside Bulang people and Dai people in Mangba 芒坝 and Tuanliangzi 团梁子 (Simao Prefecture Almanac 1993:482). They numbered 1,627 people as of 1990.

The Lahu people live in Nanping Township (南屏乡) and Yixiang Township (倚象乡) (in Nalitian 那栗田, Yongqing Village (永庆村)) (Simao Prefecture Almanac 1993:482). They numbered 1,265 people as of 1990.

== Transport ==
Simao Airport (IATA: SYM, ICAO: ZPSM).

== Herbariums ==
- Simao District National Medical and Pharmaceutical Institute Herbarium, (founded 1970) of the Simao District Public Health Bureau
- Simao Forestry Bureau Herbarium (founded 1991)
