= Jinggu Dai and Yi Autonomous County =

Jinggu County 景谷县 · ᥛᥫᥒᥰ ᥝᥨᥝᥰ
- Autonomous county
- 景谷傣族彝族自治县; Jinggu Dai and Yi Autonomous County
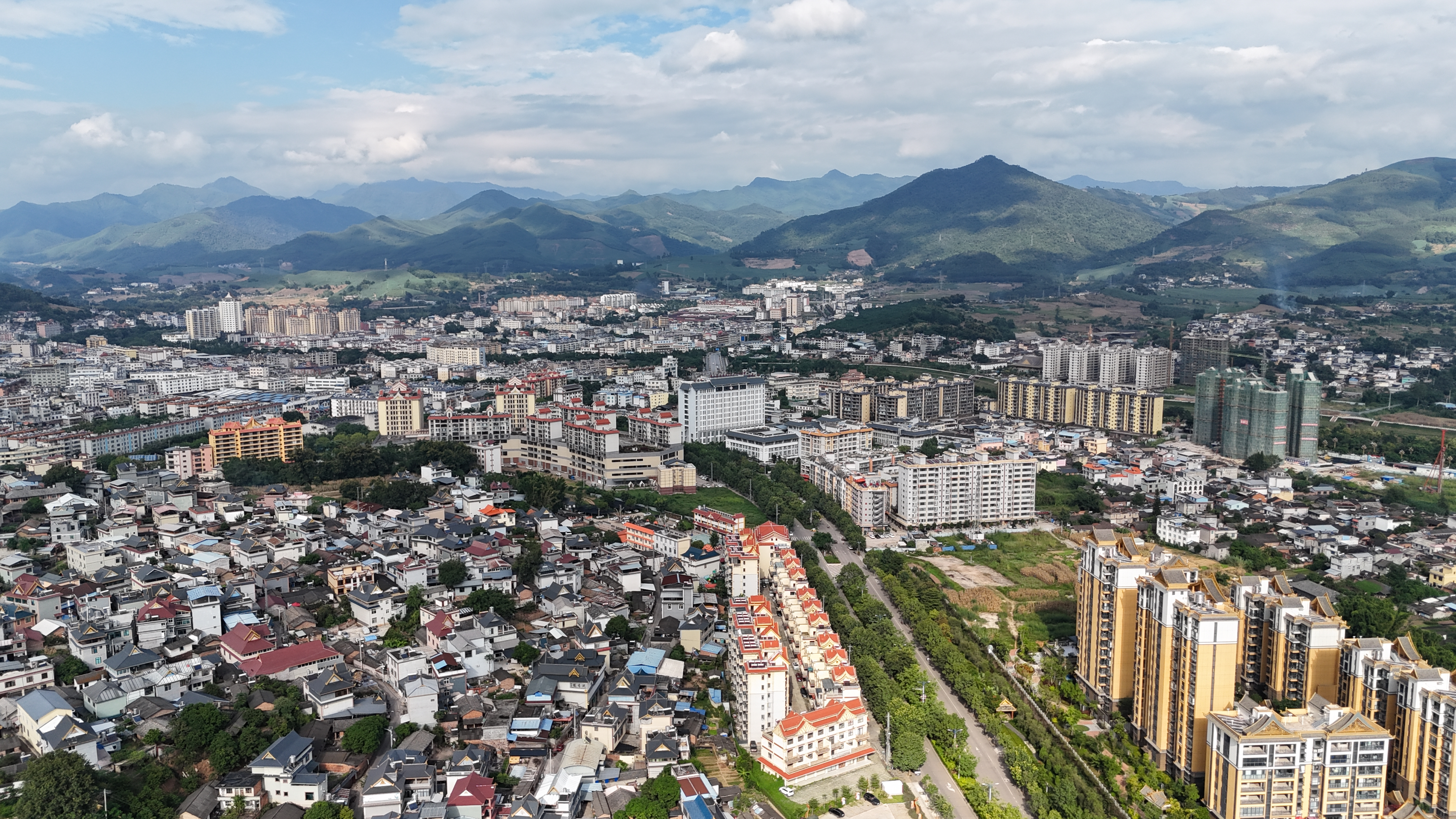
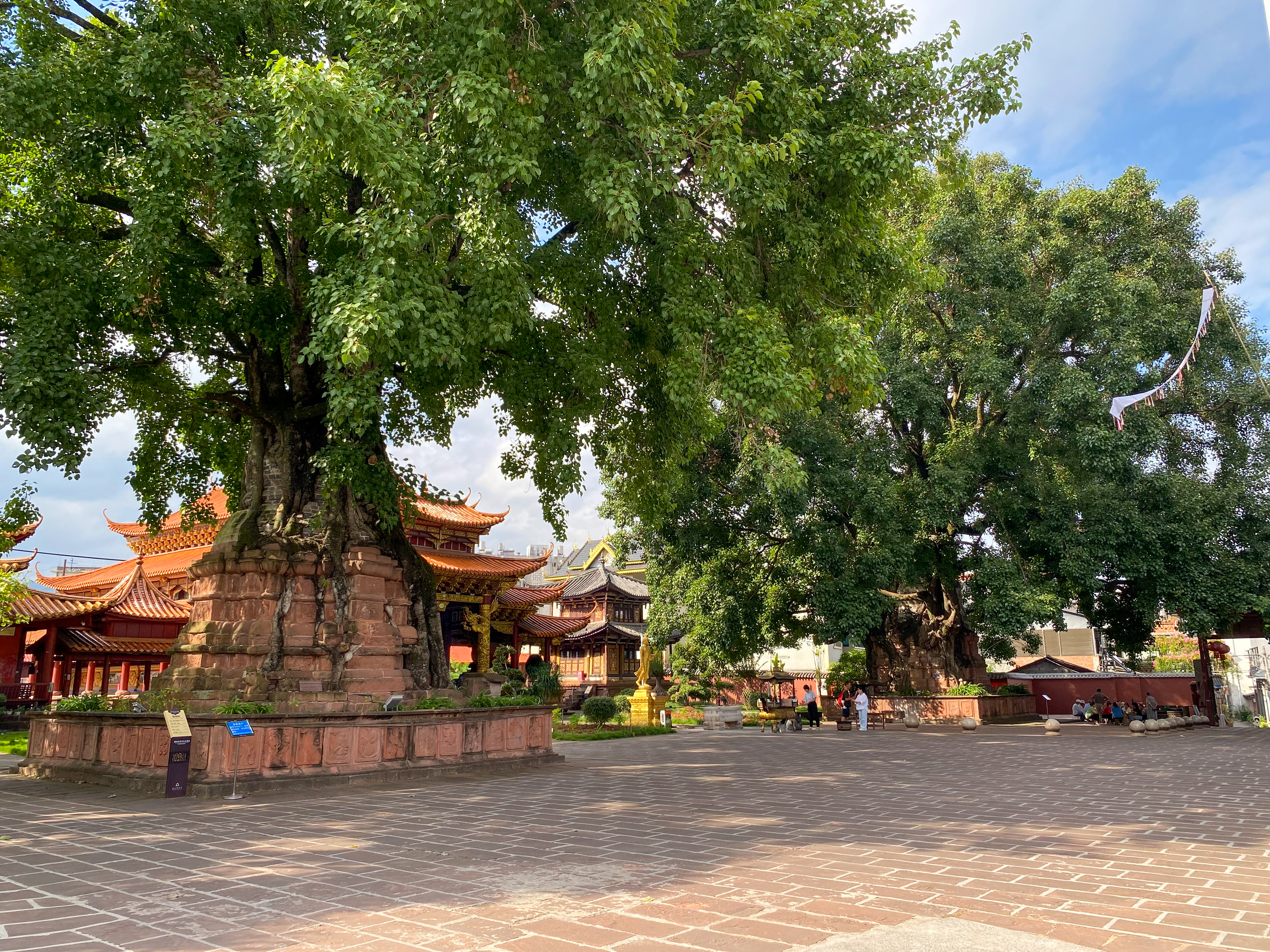
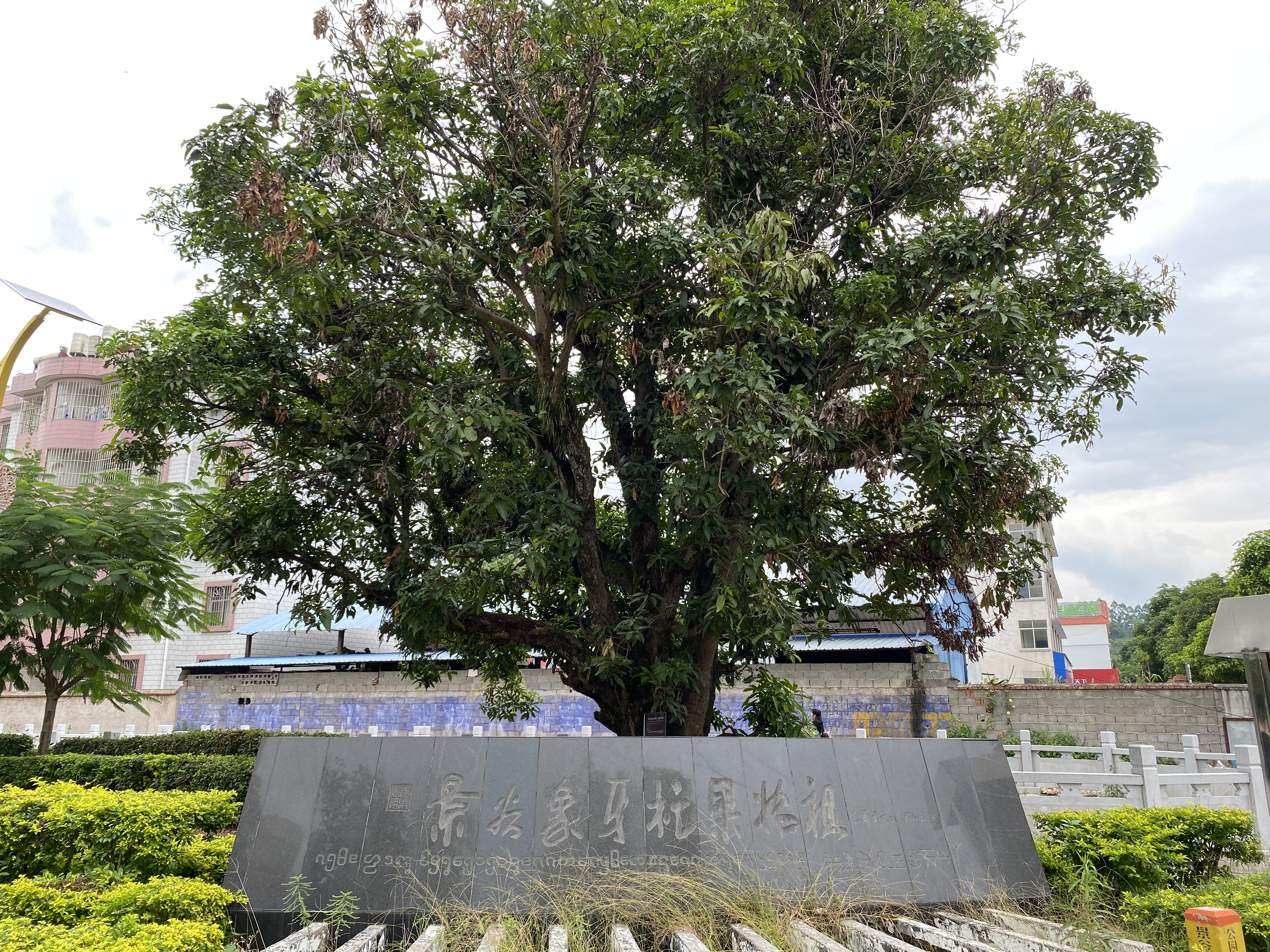
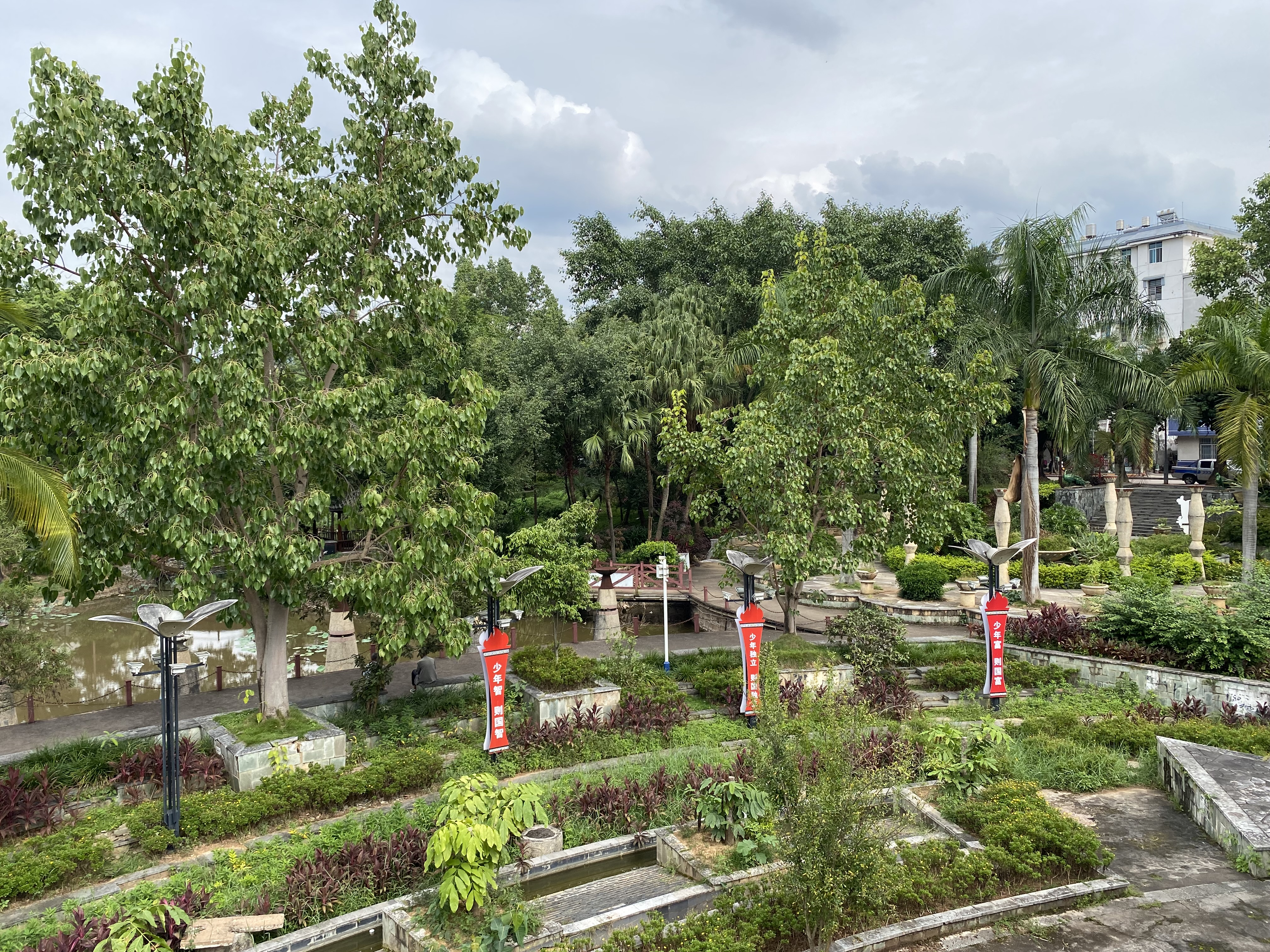
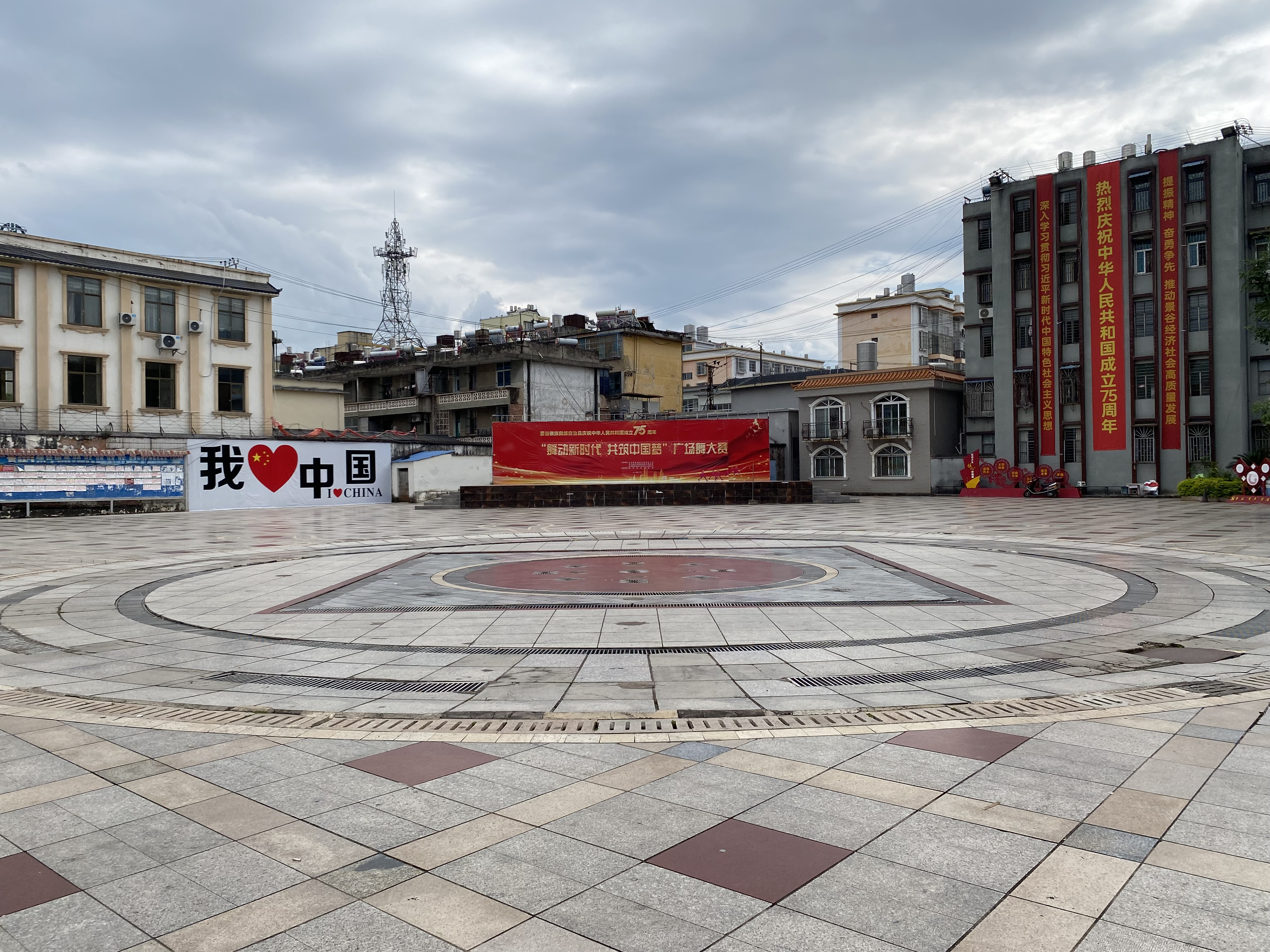
- Cityscape of county town Twin Stupas of Mengwo Central Temple Jinggu Ivory Mango Ancestor White Dragon Park Peacock Square

- Location of Jinggu County (red) and Pu'er Prefecture (pink) within Yunnan province

- Location of the seat in Yunnan
- Coordinates: 23°29′49″N 100°42′11″E
- Country: China
- Province: Yunnan
- Prefecture-level city: Pu'er
- County seat: Weiyuan

Area
  - Total: 7,550 km^{2} (2,920 sq mi)
- Elevation: 946 m (3,104 ft)

Population (2020 census)
  - Total: 277,417
  - Density: 36.7/km^{2} (95.2/sq mi)
- Time zone: UTC+8 (China Standard Time)
- Postal code: 666400
- Area code: 0879
- GB/T 2260 CODE: 530824
- Website: www.jinggu.gov.cn
- ^{1}Yunnan Statistics Bureau^{2}Puer Gov.^{3}Yunnan Portal

Jinggu Dai and Yi Autonomous County (Chinese: 景谷傣族彝族自治县; pinyin: Jǐnggǔ Dǎizú Yízú Zìzhìxiàn; Tai Nüa: ᥛᥫᥒᥰ ᥝᥨᥝᥰ (Note: Also known as ᥛᥫᥒᥰ ᥐᥣᥲ, because Jinggu historically belonged to 2 Mueangs in the history. ᥛᥫᥒᥰ ᥝᥨᥝᥰ is the common name nowadays, and ᥛᥫᥒᥰ ᥐᥣᥲ is rarely used.)) is an autonomous county under the jurisdiction of Pu'er City, Yunnan Province, China. It borders Ning'er County to the east, Simao District and Ning'er County across Weiyuan and Xiaohei Rivers to the south and southeast, Lancang County, Linxiang District and Shuangjiang County across the Lancang River to the west, and Zhenyuan County to the north.

== Administrative divisions ==
In the present, Jinggu Dai and Yi Autonomous County has 6 towns and 4 townships.

6 towns

- Weiyuan (威远镇)
- Yongping (永平镇)
- Zhengxing (正兴镇)
- Minyue (民乐镇)
- Fengshan (凤山镇)
- Jinggu (景谷镇)

4 townships

- Bi'an (碧安乡)
- Yizhi (益智乡)
- Banpo (半坡乡)
- Mengban (勐班乡)

== Ethnic groups ==
The Jinggu County Gazetteer (1993:682) lists the following ethnic groups and their locations.

- Hani (pop. 2,440)
  - Fengshan Township 凤山乡: Wenzhe 文折村 and Wenshao 文绍村 villages (total pop. 1,562)
  - Bi'an Township 碧安乡
- Hui (pop. 1,711)
  - Weiyuan 威远, Yongping 永平, Bi'an 碧安 townships
- Bulang (pop. 1,532)
  - Manghai Village 芒海村, Mengban Township 勐班乡
  - Guangmin Village 光明村, Bi'an Township 碧安乡
  - Zhongshan 钟山, Lemin 民乐, Bianjiang 边江, Banpo 半坡 townships
- Bai (pop. 1,153)
  - Bi'an 碧安, Zhengxing 正兴, Bianjiang 边江 townships

Yi subgroups in Jinggu are:

- Lalu 腊鲁 (Xiangtang 香堂)
- Lami 腊米 (Mili 米俐)
- Gaisu 改苏 (Luoluo 倮倮)
- Laluo 腊罗 (Menghua 蒙化)
- Sani 撒尼
- Awu 阿武

== 2014 earthquake ==
On October 7, 2014 a magnitude 6.6 earthquake struck the Jinggu county at 9:49 p.m. local time. The earthquake was felt in many parts of Yunnan including the provincial capital, Kunming, nearly 300 miles away.

== Climate ==
Climate data for Jinggu, elevation 979 m (3,212 ft), (1991–2020 normals, extremes 1981–2010)
Month	Jan	Feb	Mar	Apr	May	Jun	Jul	Aug	Sep	Oct	Nov	Dec	Year
Record high °C (°F)	30.4 (86.7)	32.9 (91.2)	35.3 (95.5)	37.1 (98.8)	39.5 (103.1)	38.2 (100.8)	35.3 (95.5)	35.5 (95.9)	34.7 (94.5)	33.3 (91.9)	31.1 (88.0)	28.6 (83.5)	39.5 (103.1)
Mean daily maximum °C (°F)	23.9 (75.0)	26.7 (80.1)	29.9 (85.8)	31.7 (89.1)	32.0 (89.6)	31.3 (88.3)	30.2 (86.4)	30.5 (86.9)	30.1 (86.2)	28.1 (82.6)	25.7 (78.3)	23.2 (73.8)	28.6 (83.5)
Daily mean °C (°F)	13.8 (56.8)	16.2 (61.2)	19.6 (67.3)	22.5 (72.5)	24.5 (76.1)	25.4 (77.7)	24.8 (76.6)	24.6 (76.3)	23.8 (74.8)	21.8 (71.2)	17.8 (64.0)	14.5 (58.1)	20.8 (69.4)
Mean daily minimum °C (°F)	8.3 (46.9)	8.9 (48.0)	12.0 (53.6)	15.7 (60.3)	19.2 (66.6)	21.8 (71.2)	21.9 (71.4)	21.6 (70.9)	20.7 (69.3)	18.6 (65.5)	14.0 (57.2)	10.5 (50.9)	16.1 (61.0)
Record low °C (°F)	2.5 (36.5)	2.3 (36.1)	2.6 (36.7)	9.6 (49.3)	12.4 (54.3)	15.7 (60.3)	17.8 (64.0)	16.8 (62.2)	13.2 (55.8)	8.7 (47.7)	5.5 (41.9)	0.9 (33.6)	0.9 (33.6)
Average precipitation mm (inches)	26.5 (1.04)	14.6 (0.57)	21.1 (0.83)	46.2 (1.82)	105.2 (4.14)	171.1 (6.74)	296.7 (11.68)	247.5 (9.74)	159.7 (6.29)	122.9 (4.84)	45.8 (1.80)	16.6 (0.65)	1,273.9 (50.14)
Average precipitation days (≥ 0.1 mm)	4.6	3.3	5.3	8.7	13.8	19.8	24.9	23.0	17.0	15.0	6.2	4.4	146
Average relative humidity (%)	78	67	60	62	68	77	83	83	82	82	82	82	76
Mean monthly sunshine hours	198.7	221.2	231.9	225.3	204.4	149.8	128.9	152.3	152.4	150.3	163.5	165.8	2,144.5
Percentage possible sunshine	59	69	62	59	50	37	31	38	42	42	50	50	49
Source: China Meteorological Administration
