= Pu'er City =

Pu'er 普洱市
- Prefecture-level city
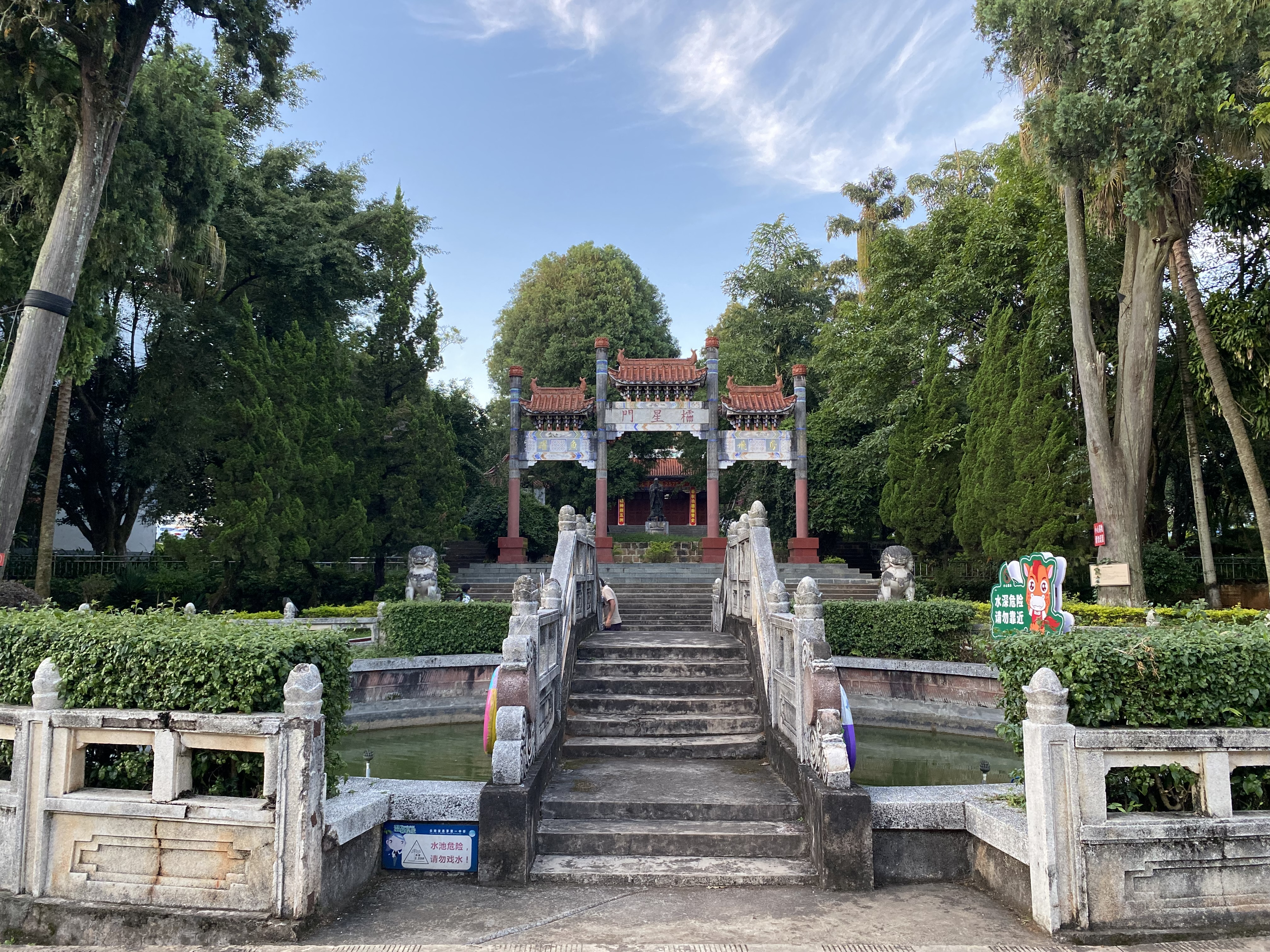
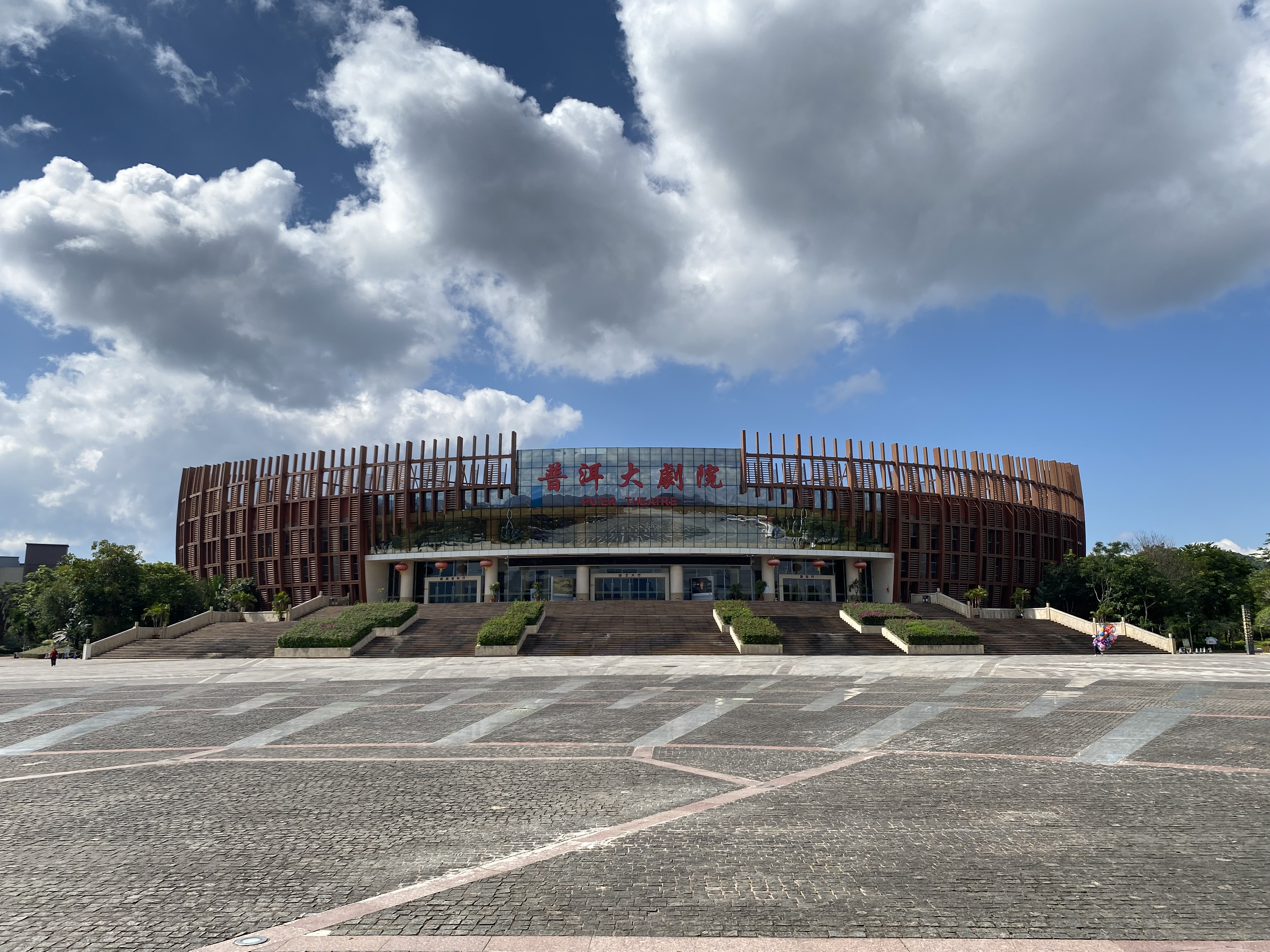
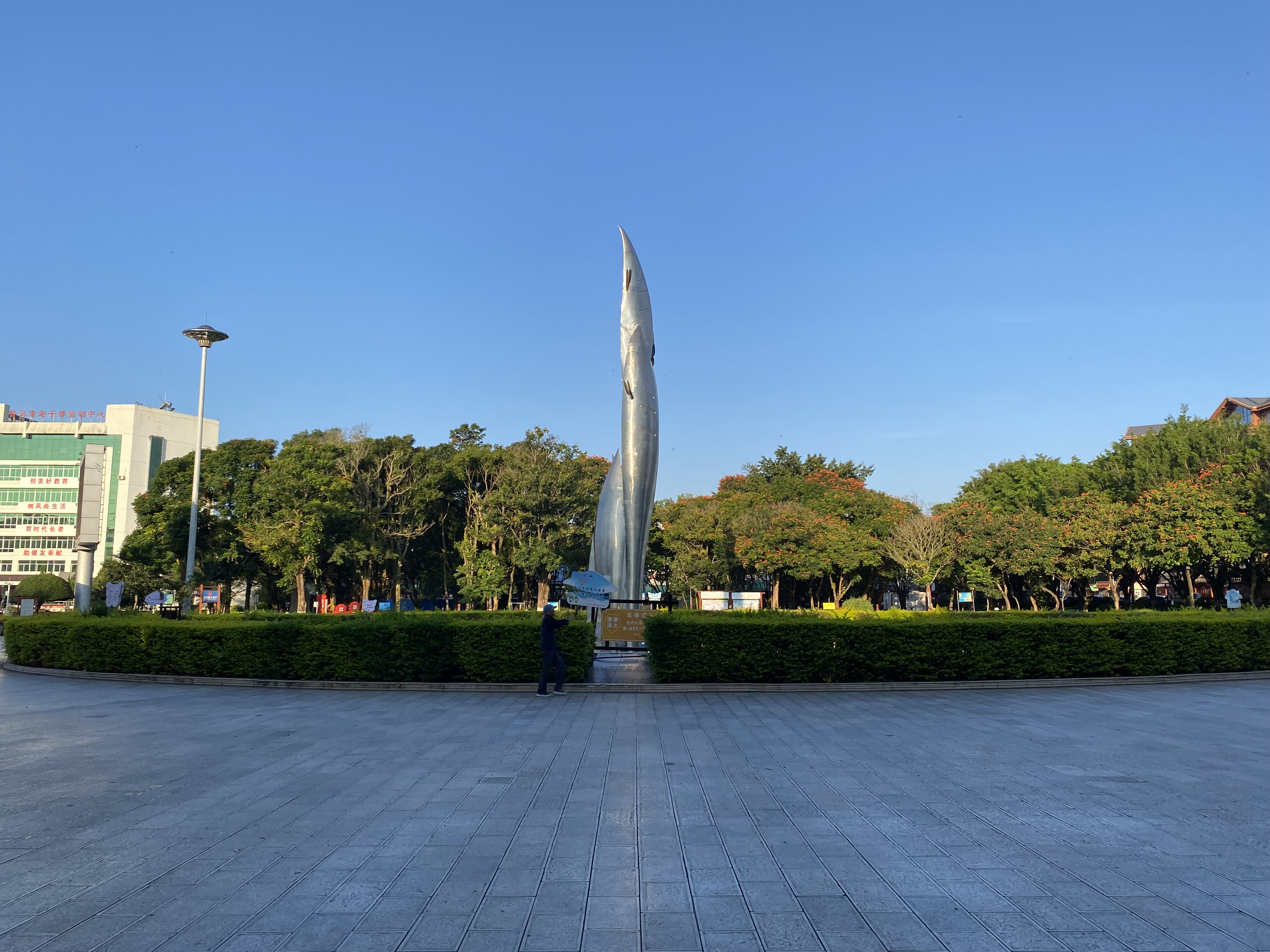
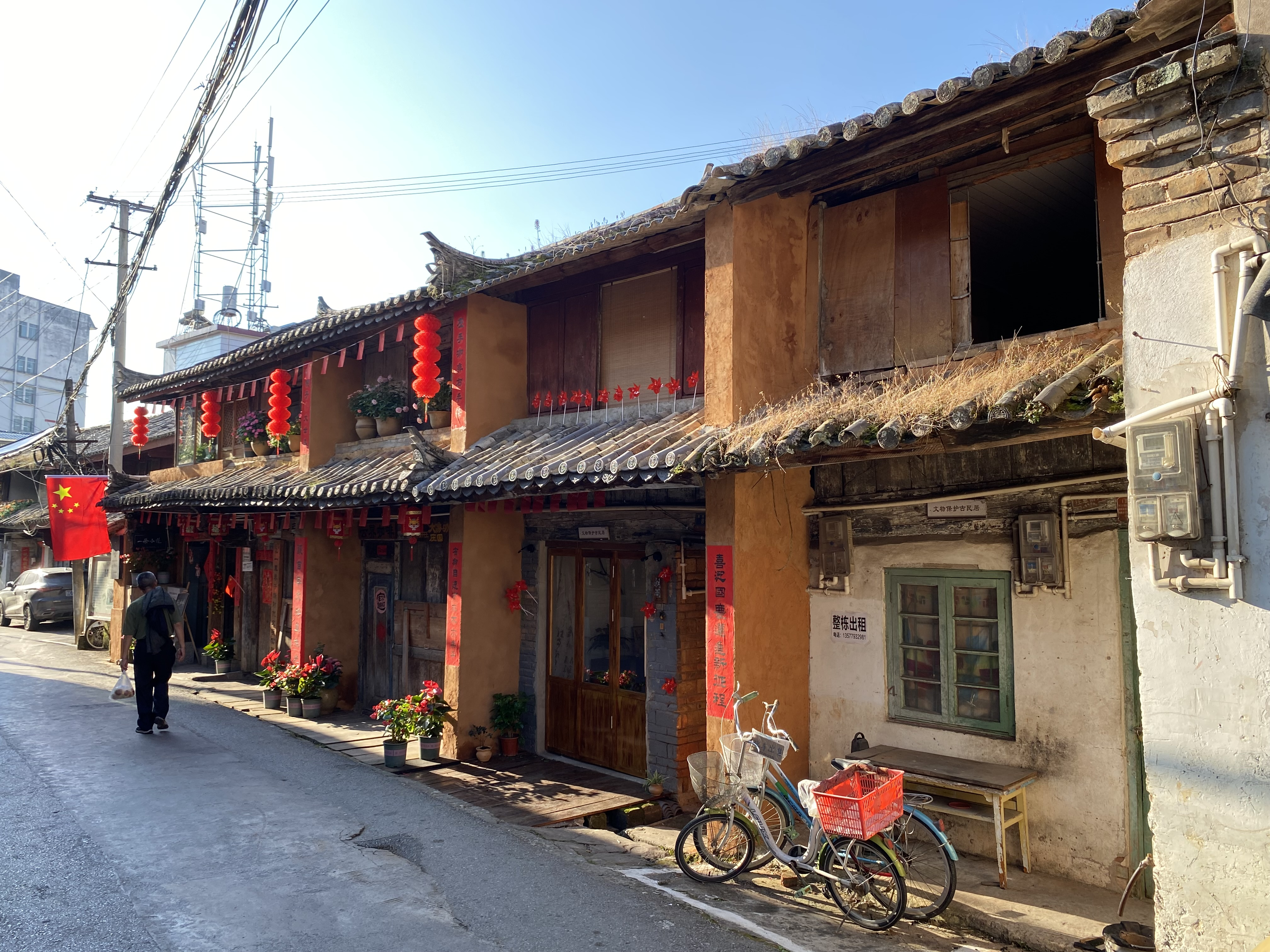
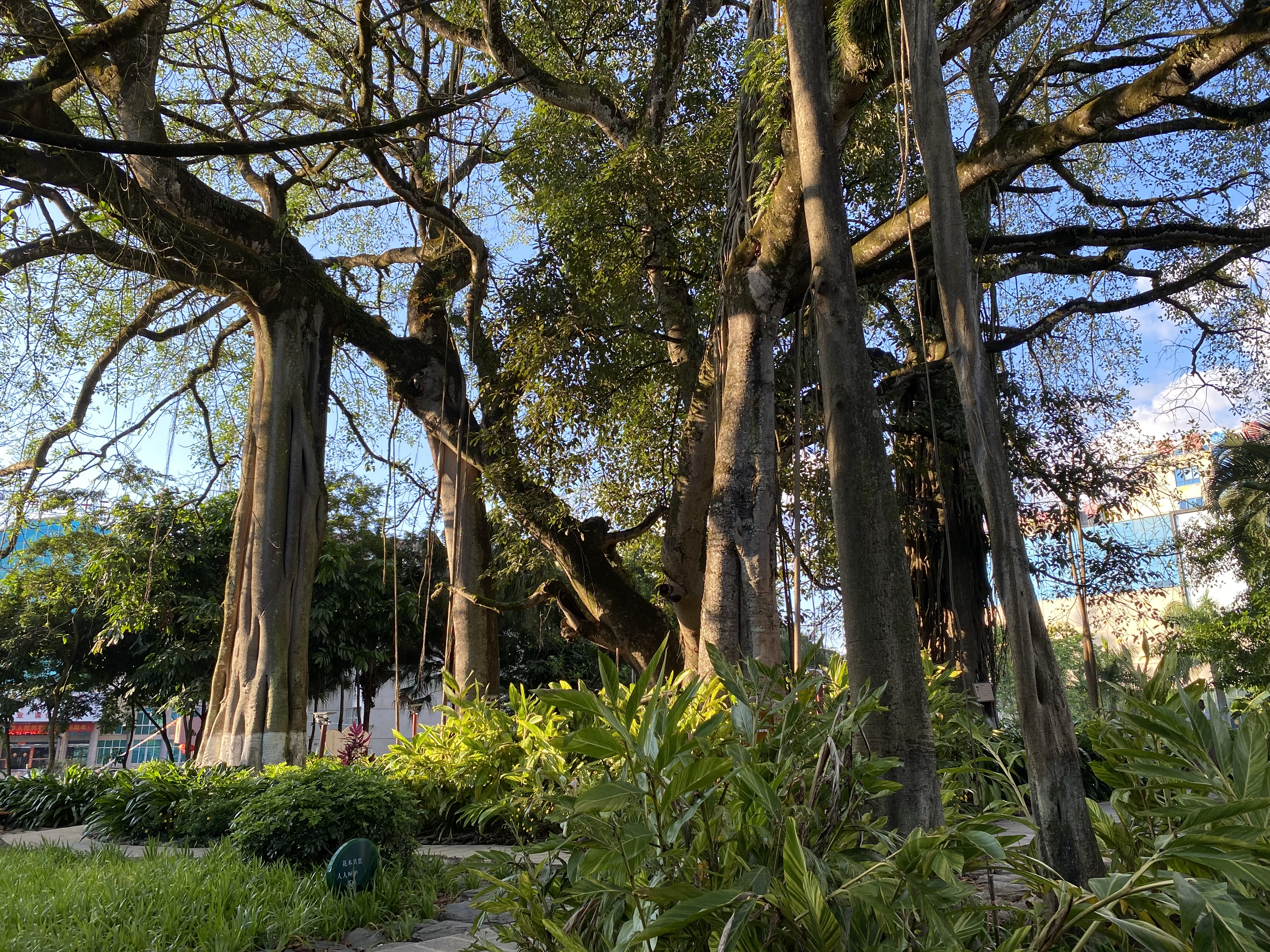
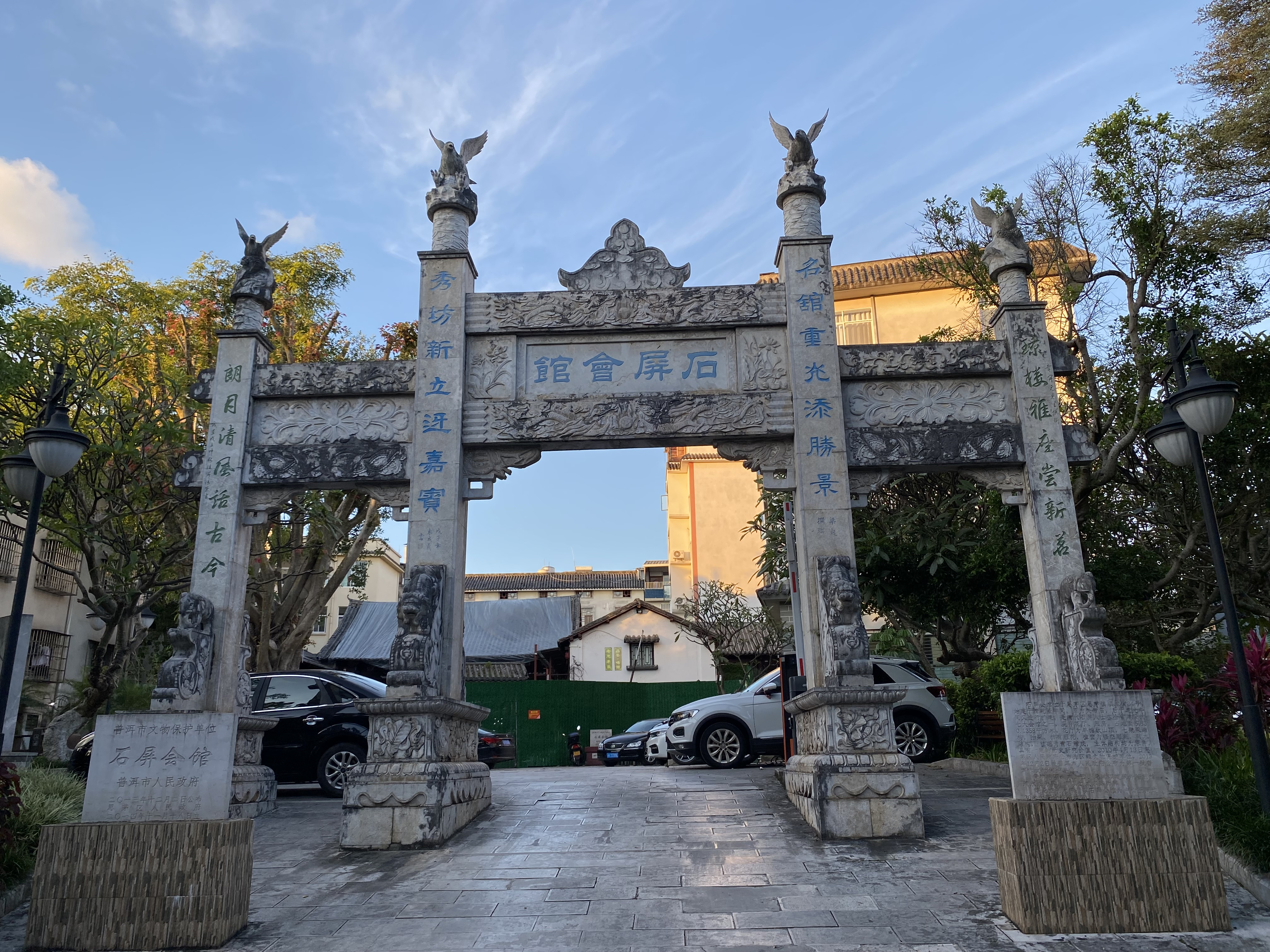
- Simao Confucian Temple Pu'er Grand Theatre Red Flag Square Daijia Alley Inverted Roots Park Shiping Guildhall

- Location of Pu'er City jurisdiction in Yunnan

- Location of the city centre in Yunnan
- Coordinates (Simao District government): 22°47′12″N 100°58′38″E
- Country: People's Republic of China
- Province: Yunnan
- GB/T 2260 CODE: 530800
- Admin HQ: Simao District
- Admin units: List: Simao; Ning'er; Mojiang; Jingdong; Jinggu; Zhenyuan; Jiangcheng; Menglian; Lancang; Ximeng

Area
  - Total: 44,264.79 km^{2} (17,090.73 sq mi)
- Elevation: 1,306 m (4,285 ft)
- Highest elevation: 3,306 m (10,846 ft)
- Lowest elevation: 376 m (1,234 ft)

Population (2010)
  - Total: 2,542,898
  - Density: 57.44742/km^{2} (148.7881/sq mi)

GDP
  - Total: CN¥ 107.3 billion US$ 15.8 billion
  - Per capita: CN¥ 45,168; US$ 6,662
- Time zone: UTC+8 (China Standard Time)
- Postal code: 665000
- Area code: 0879
- ISO 3166 code: CN-YN-08
- Licence plate prefixes: 云J
- Website: www.puershi.gov.cn (in Chinese)
- Yunnan Statistics Bureau Yunnan Portal

Pu'er City
- Chinese: 普洱
- Postal: Puerh
Transcriptions
Standard Mandarin
- Hanyu Pinyin: Pǔ'ěr
- Wade–Giles: P‘u-erh

Simao
- Chinese: 思茅
- Postal: Szumao
Transcriptions
Standard Mandarin
- Hanyu Pinyin: Sīmáo
- Wade–Giles: Szu-mao

Pu'er is a prefecture-level city in southern Yunnan Province, China. Pu'er City governs 9 counties, 1 district, 103 townships (towns), and a total population of 2.65 million. The urban administrative center of Pu'er is Simao District, which is also the former name of the prefecture-level city itself. A major downturn in the price of tea in 2007 caused severe economic distress in the area. Tea prices have since recovered, and Pu'er tea, a type of dark tea, still contributes much to the income of the area. By the end of 2024, the resident population of the city will be 2.337 million. It is the only prefecture in Yunnan to border Vietnam, Laos, and Burma. Ethnic minorities account for the majority of its population.

== Etymology ==
Nanzhao set a division called Bu'ri Jian (步日瞼) (Note: Jian (瞼) is the proper name of the administrative division of Nanzhao.) in 839 AD; this was the first time the region was integrated into the administrative system of a Chinese dynasty. In the Yuan dynasty, the central government changed the name to Pu'ri (普日) in 1278. Finally in Ming dynasty, the name was changed to "Pu'er" (普耳) in 1384. The character of "er" (耳) was changed to 洱 in Wanli Emperor period. The name "普洱" (Pu'er) has continued to be used to this day. Wa scholar Ni-ga states that the original name "Bu'ri" is the exonym of Blang people in Baraoke language, a dialect of Wa language, which means "my brother".

Pu'er tea has the name "Pu'er" because Pu'er was the distribution centre of the tea produced in the south-west of Yunnan during the Ming and Qing dynasty. Pu'er tea became world-famous, and the city Pu'er also became famous as a result of the tea. The Yinsheng Festival was first established in the Nanzhao Kingdom of the Tang Dynasty. There were records of "Pu Tea" in the Ming Dynasty.

== History ==
Its name was changed to Simao in 1950 following the Communist victory in the Chinese Civil War, while its surrounding county was known as Pu'er. In 2007, the town's name was changed back to Pu'er; the surrounding area became known as Ning'er County; and the name Simao was taken by a town and district within the city. The change had an effect on the size of the official Pu'er tea production area, a major regional product.

The primary production area of traditional Pu'er tea, the forests surrounding Jingmai Mountain (普洱景迈山古茶林) in Lancang County, has been inscribed as a UNESCO World Heritage site.

== Geography and climate ==
Pu'er is located in southern Yunnan, on the lower reaches of the Mekong (known in Chinese as the Lancang), with the bordering prefectures being Yuxi and Honghe to the east, Xishuangbanna to the south, Lincang to the west, and Dali and Chuxiong to the north. It also shares borders with Vietnam (Điện Biên Province and Lai Châu Province) and Laos (Phongsaly Province) to the south, and Burma (Shan State) to the southwest, being the only prefecture in Yunnan to border all three countries. As with much of the province, mountainous terrain dominates its administrative area, covering 98.3%. Elevations range from 376 to 3,306 metres (1,234 to 10,846 ft).

Located at an altitude of above 1,300 m (4,300 ft) and within a degree south of the Tropic of Cancer, Pu'er, as with much of southern Yunnan, has a warm humid subtropical climate (Köppen Cwa), with muddled distinction between the seasons and daytime temperatures remaining warm year-round. Highs peak in April and May before the core of the rainy season and reach a minimum in December; however, the warmest and coolest months are June and January, respectively at 23.0 °C (73.4 °F) and 13.7 °C (56.7 °F); the annual mean is 19.3 °C (66.7 °F). June through September accounts for nearly 70% of the annual rainfall of 1,442 mm (56.8 in) and during this time, some rainfall occurs on most days, pushing relative humidity above 80% and there is a marked reduction in sunshine. With monthly percent possible sunshine ranging from 27% in July to 69% in February, the city receives 2,206 hours of bright sunshine annually.

Climate data for Pu'er (Simao District), elevation 1,302 m (4,272 ft), (1991–2020 normals, extremes 1971–present)
Month	Jan	Feb	Mar	Apr	May	Jun	Jul	Aug	Sep	Oct	Nov	Dec	Year
Record high °C (°F)	27.6 (81.7)	29.8 (85.6)	34.7 (94.5)	34.2 (93.6)	36.2 (97.2)	34.2 (93.6)	31.8 (89.2)	33.1 (91.6)	31.0 (87.8)	30.1 (86.2)	28.9 (84.0)	26.3 (79.3)	36.2 (97.2)
Mean daily maximum °C (°F)	21.1 (70.0)	23.6 (74.5)	26.7 (80.1)	28.6 (83.5)	28.6 (83.5)	27.9 (82.2)	26.9 (80.4)	27.2 (81.0)	26.8 (80.2)	25.0 (77.0)	22.9 (73.2)	20.5 (68.9)	25.5 (77.9)
Daily mean °C (°F)	13.7 (56.7)	15.4 (59.7)	18.6 (65.5)	21.1 (70.0)	22.4 (72.3)	23.0 (73.4)	22.5 (72.5)	22.4 (72.3)	21.7 (71.1)	20.0 (68.0)	16.8 (62.2)	14.0 (57.2)	19.3 (66.7)
Mean daily minimum °C (°F)	8.7 (47.7)	9.4 (48.9)	12.2 (54.0)	15.3 (59.5)	18.1 (64.6)	20.1 (68.2)	20.1 (68.2)	19.8 (67.6)	18.9 (66.0)	17.0 (62.6)	13.1 (55.6)	9.9 (49.8)	15.2 (59.4)
Record low °C (°F)	−2.5 (27.5)	2.4 (36.3)	0.8 (33.4)	7.1 (44.8)	10.8 (51.4)	14.3 (57.7)	15.0 (59.0)	14.8 (58.6)	11.3 (52.3)	4.9 (40.8)	2.0 (35.6)	−0.9 (30.4)	−2.5 (27.5)
Average precipitation mm (inches)	27.3 (1.07)	15.3 (0.60)	27.7 (1.09)	54.9 (2.16)	138.7 (5.46)	200.5 (7.89)	322.4 (12.69)	286.1 (11.26)	175.9 (6.93)	119.7 (4.71)	49.5 (1.95)	24.2 (0.95)	1,442.2 (56.76)
Average precipitation days (≥ 0.1 mm)	4.0	3.3	4.5	9.0	15.7	21.5	25.3	24.2	19.3	14.1	6.2	4.2	151.3
Average relative humidity (%)	75	66	60	63	71	80	84	84	82	81	80	80	76
Mean monthly sunshine hours	228.4	224.0	235.9	239.1	210.1	148.1	111.7	128.3	146.1	152.1	187.6	194.5	2,205.9
Percentage possible sunshine	68	69	63	63	51	37	27	32	40	43	57	59	51
Source 1: China Meteorological Administrationall-time November high
Source 2: Weather China

The "Pu'er Jingmai Mountain Ancient Tea Plantation" is a protected cultural landscape on China's tentative list for UNESCO World Heritage. This initiative focuses on preserving a unique agro-forestry system where tea plants have been cultivated under the canopy of natural forests for centuries by the Blang and Dai ethnic groups.

== Administrative divisions ==
Map
Name	Hanzi	Hanyu Pinyin	Population (2010)	Area (km^{2})	Density (/km^{2})
Simao District	思茅区	Sīmáo Qū	296,500	4,093	72
Ning'er Hani and Yi Autonomous County	宁洱哈尼族彝族自治县	Níng'ěr Hānízú Yízú Zìzhìxiàn	185,700	3,670	51
Mojiang Hani Autonomous County	墨江哈尼族自治县	Mòjiāng Hānízú Zìzhìxiàn	360,500	5,459	66
Jingdong Yi Autonomous County	景东彝族自治县	Jǐngdōng Yízú Zìzhìxiàn	359,500	4,532	79
Jinggu Dai and Yi Autonomous County	景谷傣族彝族自治县	Jǐnggǔ Dǎizú Yízú Zìzhìxiàn	291,700	7,777	38
Zhenyuan Yi, Hani and Lahu Autonomous County	镇沅彝族哈尼族拉祜族自治县	Zhènyuán Yízú Hānízú Lāhùzú Zìzhìxiàn	208,600	4,223	49
Jiangcheng Hani and Yi Autonomous County	江城哈尼族彝族自治县	Jiāngchéng Hānízú Yízú Zìzhìxiàn	121,500	3,476	35
Menglian Dai, Lahu and Va Autonomous County	孟连傣族拉祜族佤族自治县	Mènglián Dǎizú Lāhùzú Wǎzú Zìzhìxiàn	135,500	1,957	69
Lancang Lahu Autonomous County	澜沧拉祜族自治县	Láncāng Lāhùzú Zìzhìxiàn	491,900	8,807	56
Ximeng Va Autonomous County	西盟佤族自治县	Xīméng Wǎzú Zìzhìxiàn	91,300	1,391	66

== Demographics ==
According to the Seventh National Census in 2020, the city's Permanent Population (hukou) was 2,404,954. Compared with the Sixth National Census, the ten-year decrease was 137,944, a decrease of 5.42%. The average annual decrease of 13,794 people, the average annual growth rate of -0.55%. Among them, there are 1,264,767 males, accounting for 52.59% of the total population; 1,140,187 females, accounting for 47.41% of the total population. The sex ratio of the total population (female is 100) is 110.93. The population aged 0–14 is 451,650, accounting for 18.78%; the population aged 15–59 is 1,574,042, accounting for 65.45%; the population aged 60 and over is 379,502, accounting for 15.78%. The population living in cities and towns was 974,728, accounting for 40.53% of the total population; the population living in rural areas was 1,430,226, accounting for 59.47% of the total population.

At the end of 2023 and the beginning of 2024, the permanent population will be 2.34 million.

=== Nationality ===
Among the resident population, the Han population is 991,585, accounting for 38.99% of the total population; the ethnic minorities population is 1,551,313, accounting for 61.01% of the total population. There are 26 ethnic groups, 14 permanent ethnic groups, 5 main ethnic minorities, and 5 "direct ethnic groups".

Ethnic Composition of Pu'er City (November 2020)
National name	Han	Hani	Yi	Lahu	Wa	Dai	Bulang	Hui	Bai	Hmong	Others
Population	933369	407504	402687	285329	144516	146682	15668	12909	14337	14845	28108
Proportion of total population (%)	38.81	16.95	16.74	11.87	6.01	6.10	0.65	0.54	0.60	0.62	1.11
Proportion of minority population (%)	---	27.69	27.36	19.41	9.82	9.96	1.06	0.88	0.98	1.01	1.83

== Transport ==
- Asian Highway Network AH3 It is a highway in the Asian Highway system, 7,331 kilometers (4,555 miles) long.
- China National Highway 213 This national highway is a national highway in northwest and southwest China. It starts from Xigu District, Lanzhou City and ends at Mengla County, Xishuangbanna Autonomous Prefecture. It has a total length of 2,827 kilometers and passes through the four provinces of Gansu, Sichuan, Guizhou and Yunnan.
- Kunming–Bangkok Expressway The total length is 1,880 kilometers, starting from the Kunming Toll Station at the entrance of Kunming Yuxi Expressway in the east and ending in Bangkok, Thailand. The entire line consists of a section in China, a section in Laos and a section in Thailand. It was officially opened to traffic in December 2008.
- Pu'er Simao Airport Pu'er Simao Airport is located at the southeastern foothills of Wuliang Mountain in southwest Yunnan and east of the Lancang River. The airport covers an area of 1,487 acres. The flight area is graded 4C. The runway is 2,500 meters long, 45 meters wide, and has 3 parking spaces.
- Pu'er Railway Station opened on December 3, 2021, can be reached by high-speed rail to Kunming, capital of Yunnan province, and other cities.
