= Awu language =

Loloish language of Yunnan, China

Awu
- Luyu
- Pronunciation: [lu33 ju33 za33]
- Native to: China
- Region: Yunnan
- Language family: Sino-Tibetan: (Tibeto-Burman); Lolo–Burmese; Loloish; Central Loloish?; Lawoish; Awu

Language codes
- ISO 639-3: yiu
- Glottolog: sout2719

Awu (Chinese: 阿邬) (autonym: lu33 ju33 za33), is an unclassified Loloish language of Yunnan, China. It is spoken in Yuanyang County, Yunnan, China, including in the village of Xiaopingzi 小坪子, Daping Township 大坪乡 (Lu & Lu 2011).

== Classification ==
Andrew Hsiu (2017) suggests that Awu is related to Lawu of Xinping County, Yunnan, and that the two form a Lawu or Lawoish language branch. The linguistic evidence suggests that the ancestors of the Awu had migrated down the Red River valley from further up northwest, and arrived at their present location after migrating downstream. Lewu, an extinct language, may have been related.

== Identity and names ==
The Awu consider themselves to be a separate ethnic group from the Hani people, including the Nuobi. However, the Awu are officially classified by the Chinese government as a Hani subgroup. On the other hand, the Nuobi refer to themselves as xa31 ni31. The Awu believe that they are culturally more similar to the Kucong, who speak a language similar to Lahu (Lu & Lu 2011:23).

The Awu call themselves lu33 ju33 za33, and are referred to by the Nuobi people as la31 wu33 za31.

== Distribution ==
Awu is also spoken in Jiangcheng Hani and Yi Autonomous County and Jinping Miao, Yao, and Dai Autonomous County. Pelkey (2011:454) calls the language Lawu Yi, and reports that it spoken in Mengla Township and other nearby areas of Jinping County. The Jinping County Ethnic Gazetteer (2013:101) calls the language Laowu 老乌 (autonym: Laoyong 老涌), which is spoken in Laojizhai 老集寨, Laomeng 老勐, Yingpan 营盘, and Mengla 勐拉 townships (in 29 villages), comprising 2,222 households and 9,342 persons as of 2005.

In southern Yunnan, Awu (a55 ɣu55 pho21) is located in Mengzi County 蒙自, Nansha of Yuanyang County 元阳南沙, Dawuzhai of Yuanyang County 元阳大乌寨, and Tuanjie Xiaozhai of Jinping County 金平团结小寨.

== Bibliography ==
- Hsiu, Andrew (2017). "The Lawu Languages: Footprints Along the Red River Valley Corridor". doi:10.5281/zenodo.1249178.
- Lu Peng 卢鹏; Lu Wei 路伟. 2011. 国际哈尼/阿卡区域文化调查: 中国元阳县大坪哈尼族阿邬人文化实录. Kunming: Yunnan People's Press 云南人民出版社. ISBN 978-7-222-07999-1
- Pelkey, Jamin R. (2011). Dialectology as Dialectic: Interpreting Phula Variation. Walter de Gruyter. ISBN 9783110245844.
