= Jinping Miao, Yao, and Dai Autonomous County =

Jinping County 金平县 · Jinb Pingx Xenf
- Autonomous county
- 金平苗族瑶族傣族自治县; Jinb Pingx Hmongb Jot Yid Zif Zhif Xenf; Jinping Miao, Yao, and Dai; Autonomous County
- Location of Jinping County in Honghe Prefecture within Yunnan province

- Location of the seat in Yunnan
- Coordinates: 22.780°N 103.226°E
- Country: China
- Province: Yunnan
- Autonomous prefecture: Honghe
- County seat: Jinhe

Area
  - Total: 3,677 km^{2} (1,420 sq mi)

Population (2020 census)
  - Total: 331,377
  - Density: 90.12/km^{2} (233.4/sq mi)
- Time zone: UTC+8 (CST)
- Postal code: 661500
- Area code: 0873
- Website: www.hhjp.gov.cn

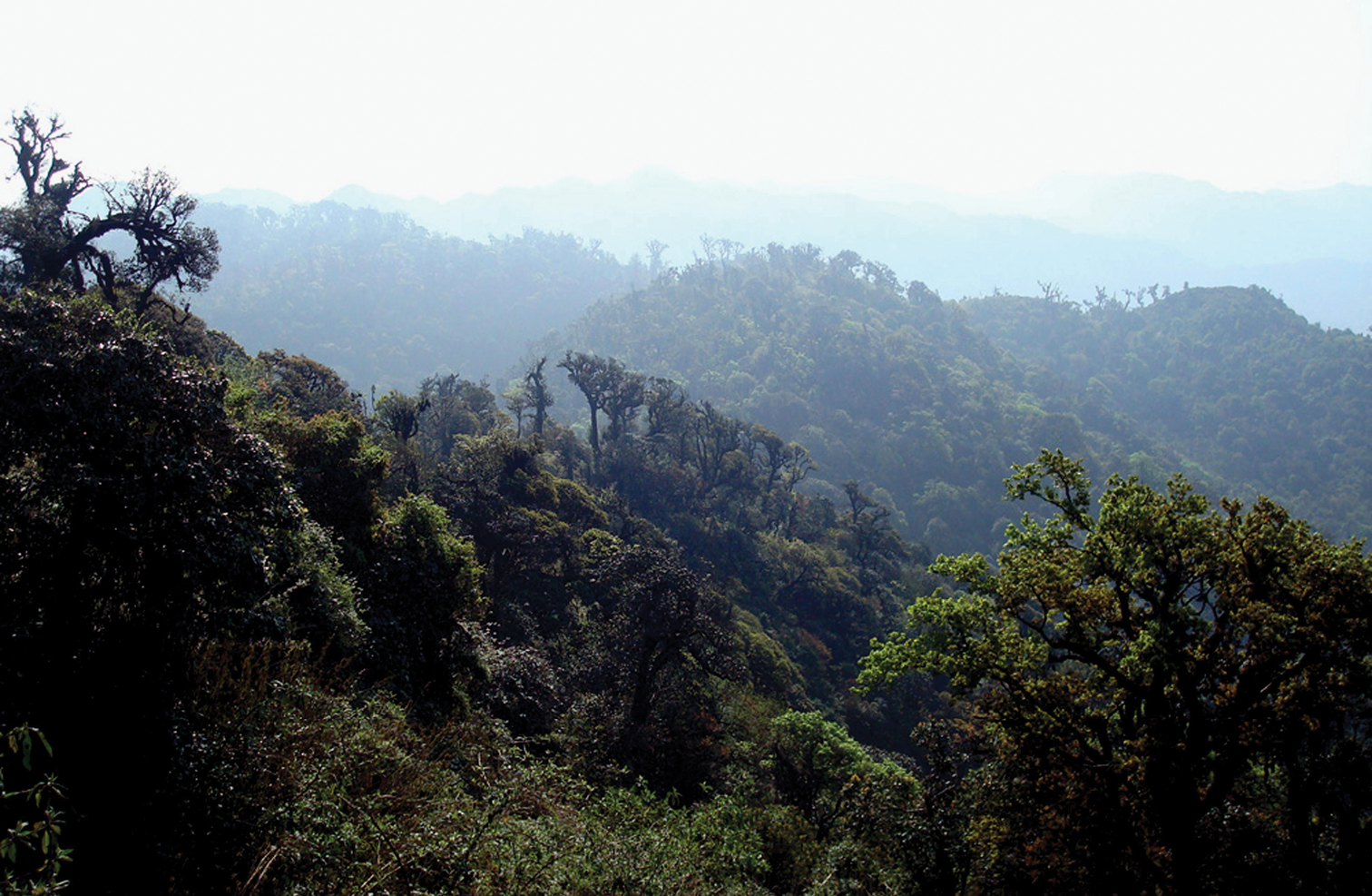
Landscape at Fenshuiling in Jinping County. Altitude ca. 2060 m.

Jinping Miao, Yao, and Dai Autonomous County (simplified Chinese: 金平苗族瑶族傣族自治县; traditional Chinese: 金平苗族瑤族傣族自治縣; pinyin: Jīnpíng Miáozú Yáozú Dǎizú Zìzhìxiàn, Hmong: Jinb Pingx Hmongb Jot Yid Zif Zhif Xenf) is located in Honghe Hani and Yi Autonomous Prefecture, Yunnan province, China, bordering Vietnam's Lai Châu Province to the south and Lào Cai Province to the southeast. Jinping is home to the Red-headed Yao (红头瑶族) minority group who wear a pointed red hat on their heads after they get married.

== Geography ==
Jinping Miao, Yao, and Dai Autonomous County borders Mengzi City, Gejiu and Hekou Yao Autonomous County across the Honghe River to the east, Lüchun County to the west and Yuanyang County, Yunnan to the north. It also borders Vietnam: Lai Châu Province (Note: specifically the Muong Te District, Nậm Nhùn District, Phong Tho District and Sin Ho District) to the south and Lào Cai Province (Bat Xat District) to the southeast. It is located in southern Honghe Prefecture in the southeast of Yunnan.

== Administrative divisions ==
Jinping Miao, Yao, and Dai Autonomous County has 4 towns 8 townships and 1 ethnic township.

4 towns

- Jinhe (金河镇)
- Jinshuihe (金水河镇)
- Mengla (勐拉镇)
- Laomeng (老勐镇)

8 townships

- Tongchang (铜厂乡)
- Laojizhai (老集寨乡)
- Adebo (阿得博乡)
- Shayipo (沙依坡乡)
- Dazhai (大寨乡)
- Ma'andi (马鞍底乡)
- Mengqiao (勐桥乡)
- Yingpan (营盘乡)

1 ethnic township

- Zhemi Lahu Ethnic Township (者米拉祜族乡)

== Ethnic groups ==
The Jinping County Gazetteer (1994:113-132) lists the following ethnic groups.

- Miao
  - Black Miao (黑苗) / Mengba 蒙吧 / Mengshi 蒙施
  - Qingshui Miao (青水苗) / Mengnengcha 蒙能差; exonym: Mengbu 蒙补 / Mengbei 蒙背
  - Flowery Miao (花苗) / Meng Leng 蒙冷
  - Piantou Miao (偏头苗) / Meng Shua 蒙刷; exonym: Chinese Miao 汉苗 (least populous Miao subgroup)
  - White Miao (白苗) / Mengdou 蒙逗
- Yao
  - Yu Mian (育棉): Red-Headed Yao 红头瑶
  - Men 门: Landian Yao 蓝靛瑶, Pingtou Yao 平头瑶, Sha Yao 沙瑶
- Dai
  - Dai Luo (傣罗) (Black Dai 黑傣, Dry Dai 旱傣): located in Kuchuyi 苦初邑, Shidong 石洞, Laomanhao 老蔓耗, Xiaohekou 小河口, Changtan 长滩
  - Dai Le (傣泐) (Pu'er Dai 普耳傣): located in Pu'erzhai 普耳寨 (Upper 上寨, Central 中寨, Lower 下寨 villages), Mengla Township/勐拉乡
  - Ludai Lunan (鲁傣鲁南) (= 水的儿子 child of the water; also called Water Dai/水傣 and White Dai/白傣)

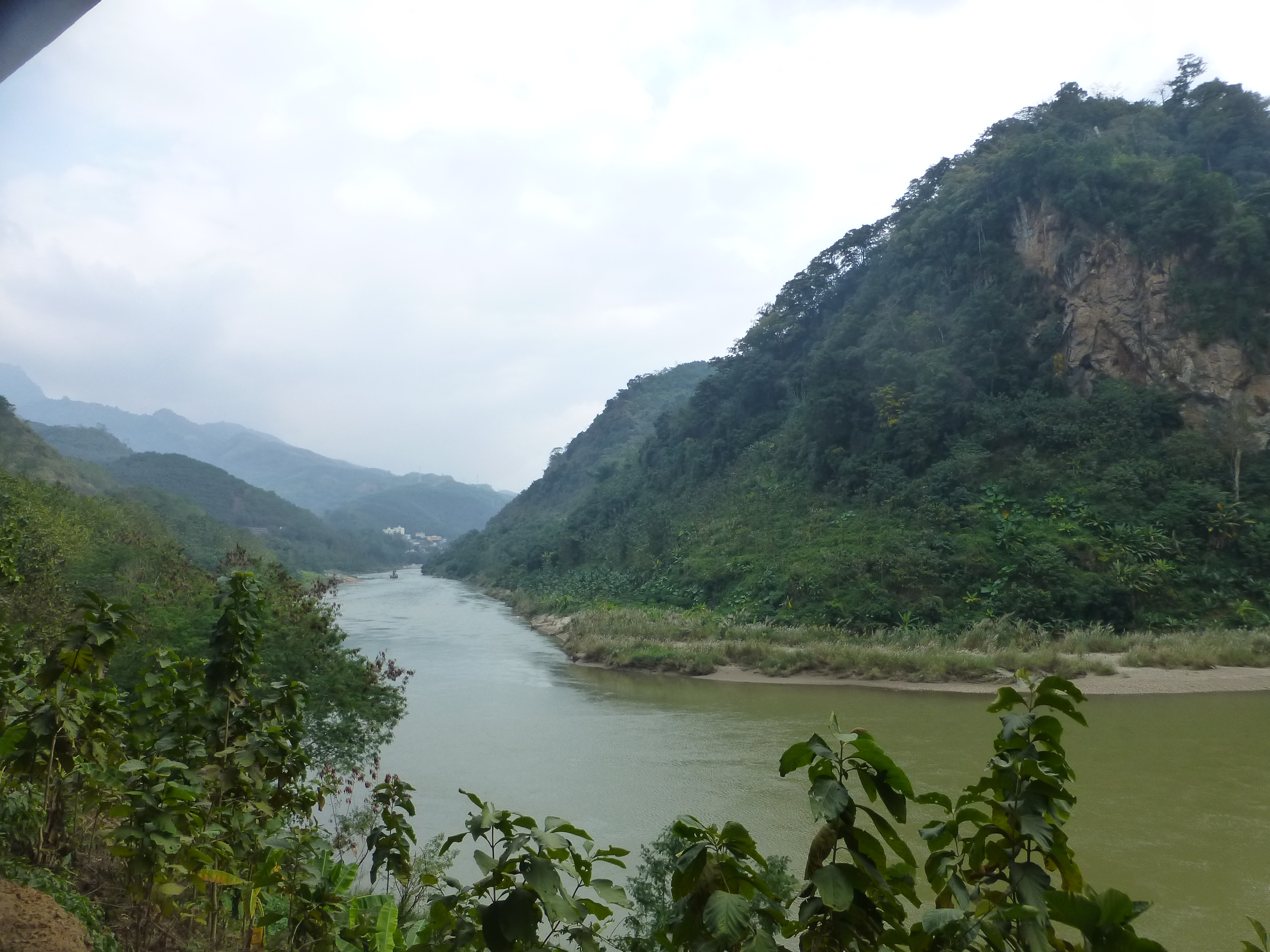
The Red River forms the border between Jinping County (right) and Hekou Yao Autonomous County (left)

- Zhuang
  - White Sha people (白沙人) (autonym: Bure 布惹)
  - Black Sha people (黑沙人) (autonym: Kacha 卡查): Zhemi Township/者米乡 (in the 3 villages of Baha 巴哈村, Bayi 巴义, and Pingzhai 坪寨). 235 households and 965 persons as of 2005.
- Lahu
  - Lahu Na (拉祜纳) (Black Lahu/黑拉祜)
  - Lahu Xi (拉祜西) (Yellow Lahu/黄拉祜)
  - Lahu Pu (拉祜普) (White Lahu/白拉祜)

An alternate list gives the following ethnic minorities and subgroups. Locations are from the Jinping County Ethnic Gazetteer (2013:89, 101).

- Miao
  - Flowery Miao (花苗)
  - White Miao (白苗)
  - Black Miao (黑苗)
  - Chinese Miao (汉苗)
- Yao
  - Red-headed Yao (红头瑶)
  - Landian Yao (蓝靛瑶)
  - Sha Yao (沙瑶)
- Dai
  - Water Dai (水傣)
  - Black Dai (黑傣)
  - Pu'er Dai (普洱傣)
- Hani
  - Nongmen (弄们) (Nuomei/糯美): widely distributed across Jinping County. 10,323 households and 42,325 persons as of 2005. It is also spoken in Hanitian 哈尼田.
  - Nongbi (弄毕) (Nuobi/糯比): in Jinhe Town (金河镇) and Tongchang Township/铜厂乡 (in 23 villages). 2,358 households and 9,902 persons as of 2005. It is also spoken in Hanitian 哈尼田.
  - Duoni (多尼): in Laojizhai Township/老集寨乡 (in the villages of Masasi 马撒斯, Bailezhai 白乐寨, and Dazhupeng 大竹棚). 793 households and 3,329 persons as of 2005.
  - Asuo (阿梭): in Laojizhai Township/老集寨乡 (in the villages of Lilaochong 李老冲, Duosha 多沙, Baimazhai 白马寨, Baigou 白沟, Nanla 南拉, and Shaluo 沙啰). 356 households and 1,425 persons as of 2005.
  - Lami (腊咪): in Laojizhai Township/老集寨乡 and Zhemi Township/者米乡 (in 20 villages). 2,135 households and 9,180 persons as of 2005.
  - Gehe (格合) (Gehe 格河; Gehuo 格活; in Laomeng Township/老勐乡 their exonym is Angluo 昂珞): in Tongchang 铜厂, Yingpan 营盘, and Laomeng 老勐 townships. 2,563 households and 10,510 persons as of 2005. Gehuo 格活 is also spoken in Baima Shangzhai, Yingpan Township, Jinping County 金平县营盘乡白马上寨村. (This is not the same as Guohe 郭合 of Dengqu Village, Majie Township, Yuanjiang County 元阳县马街乡登去村.)
  - Guozuo (国昨) (Guozhuo 郭卓): in Zhemi 者米, Mengla 勐拉, and Jinshuihe 金水河 townships. 1,953 households and 8,398 persons as of 2005.
  - Habei (哈备) (Mani 玛尼): in Habei village 哈备村, Zhemi Township/者米乡. 56 households and 231 persons as of 2005.
- Yi (speaking 4 languages: Nuosu 诺苏, Muji 姆基, Alu 阿鲁, and Laowu 老乌)
  - Nisu (尼苏): in Jinhe 金河镇, Mengqiao 勐桥乡, and Laomeng 老勐乡 townships (in 19 villages). 1,134 households and 5,519 persons as of 2005.
  - Alu (阿鲁): in Yakouzhe Village 丫口遮村, Laojizhai Township/老集寨乡 (in the villages of Luopan 罗盘, Tiantou 田头, Huilongzhai 回龙寨, Laozhai 老寨, Zhongzhai 中寨, Xihadi 西哈底, Heishan 黑山, Amilong 阿咪笼, Kabianzhai 卡边寨, Anlezhai 安乐寨, Nanlu 南鲁, etc.). 1,264 households and 5,307 persons as of 2005.
  - Pula (仆拉)
  - Muji (姆基): widely distributed across Jinping County
  - Laowu (老乌) (autonym: Laoyong/老涌): in Laojizhai 老集寨, Laomeng 老勐, Yingpan 营盘, and Mengla 勐拉 townships (in 29 villages). 2,222 households and 9,342 persons as of 2005.
  - Tulao (土老): in the 2 villages of Yugadi 鱼嘎底, Xinzhai Village 新寨村, Mengqiao Township 勐桥乡; and Laowangzhai 老王寨, Qingjiao Village 箐脚村, Dazhai Township 大寨乡
- Zhuang
  - Sha (沙人)
  - Nong (侬人)
- Lahu
  - Black Lahu (黑拉祜)
  - Yellow Lahu (黄拉祜)
  - White Lahu (白拉祜)
- Bulang (autonym: Mang/莽): in the 4 villages of Leigong Daniu 雷公打牛, Pinghe Zhongzhai 坪河中寨, Pinghe Xiazhai 平河下寨, Nanke Xinzhai 南科新寨 (also known as Longfeng village 龙凤村), all of which are administered by Jinshuihe Town (金水河镇). 110 households and 682 persons as of 2005.

The Lahu of Jinping County reside in the following villages (Jinping County Ethnic Gazetteer 2013:127). Village names are from 1985.

- Zhemi Ethnic Lahu Township/者米拉祜族乡
  - Lower Xinzhai Village 下新寨村委会: in Niudi 牛底, Upper Liangzhu 上良竹, Middle Liangzhu 中良竹 (now part of Lower Liangzhu 下良竹), Lower Liangzhu 下良竹, Upper Namihe 上纳迷河, Lower Namihe 下纳迷河, Jinzhuzhai 金竹寨, Laobaizhai 老白寨, Baixiaocun 白小村, Xincun 新村 (now part of Jinzhuzhai 金竹寨 and Baixiaocun 白小村), Longtang 龙塘, Zhongjianhe 中间河 (now part of Baixiaocun 白小村, Niudicun 牛底村, Jinzhuzhai 金竹寨); also in Kucong Xinzhai 苦聪新寨
  - Baha Village 巴哈村委会: in Sulu 苏鲁, Nanlu 南鲁, Dongshan Xiaozhai 东山小寨
  - Dingqing Village 顶青村委会: in Dipeng 地棚, Gudeng 古灯, Chaye 茶叶村, Laopuzhai 老普寨 (now part of Tuanjiezhai 团结寨), Nanmen 南门村, Liuliu Xinzhai 六六新寨, Liuqi Xinzhai 六七新寨, Tuanjiezhai 团结寨, Kucong Dazhai 苦聪大寨 (now called Dazhai 大寨村), Liangzi village 2 良子二队, Laoyangzhai 老杨寨
  - Hebianzhai Village 河边寨村委会: in Jinzhuzhai 金竹寨 (now known as Yingfang village 营房村), Dongfeng 东风, Laolinjiao village 1 老林脚一队, Laolinjiao village 2 老林脚二队
- Jinshuihe Town (金水河镇)
  - Pujiao Village 普角村委会: in Kucongzhai 苦聪寨 (now known as Lahu village 拉祜村)
  - Nanke Village 南科村委会: in Lianfang 联防村, Mujichong 母鸡冲村, Laobaizhai 老白寨, Xiaoyan 小岩
- Mengla Township/勐拉乡
  - Laowuzhai Village 老乌寨村委会: in Daqi 大其苦聪寨 (now known as Daqi 1st and 2nd Lahu villages 大其拉祜一, 二队)
  - Wengdang Village 翁当村委会: in Kucong Xinzhai 苦聪新寨 (now known as Lahu Xinzhai 拉祜新寨)

The Gezou/格邹, a Hani subgroup, are found in the following villages of Jinping County (note: Hani village name followed by Chinese name).

- District 3 三区: Lijiazha 里加扎 (Wengdang 翁当寨), Naniupuma 那纽普玛 (Daqi 大其寨), Naniuzha 那纽扎 (Xiaoqi 小其寨)
- District 4 四区: Gouqiezha 苟切扎 (Wuleguo 五了果寨), Silouqiuzha 斯楼丘扎 (Duguo 独果寨), Dapuzha 达普扎 (Ping'an 平安寨), Qiemazha 切玛扎 (Hebian 河边寨), Wupuzha 吴普扎 (Xin'an 新安寨)

The Apu/阿普 (autonym: a55 pʰu33; also known as Bokho, po21 kʰo55), an Yi subgroup, are found in Ma'andi Township/马鞍底乡.

The Luoluopo/倮倮颇 (lo33 lo55 pʰo21) or Luopo/倮颇 (lo55 pʰo21) are found in Luopan Shangzhai 罗盘上寨, Jinping County and in Zhongzhai 中寨, Dashuigou 大水沟 Township, Lüchun County. The Luopo of Jinping believe that their ancestors had migrated from Pu'er and Mojiang County, while the Luopo of Lüchun believe that their ancestors had migrated from Dali.

== Gallery ==
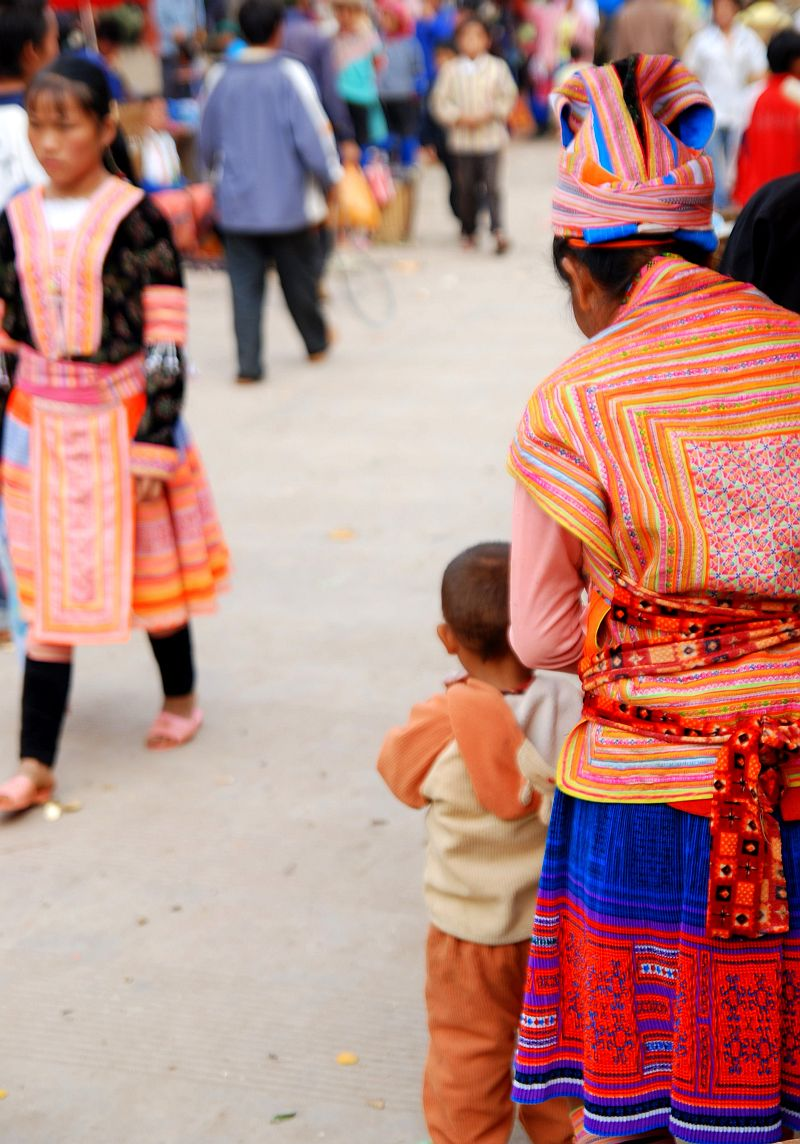
Miao on market day in Laomeng village

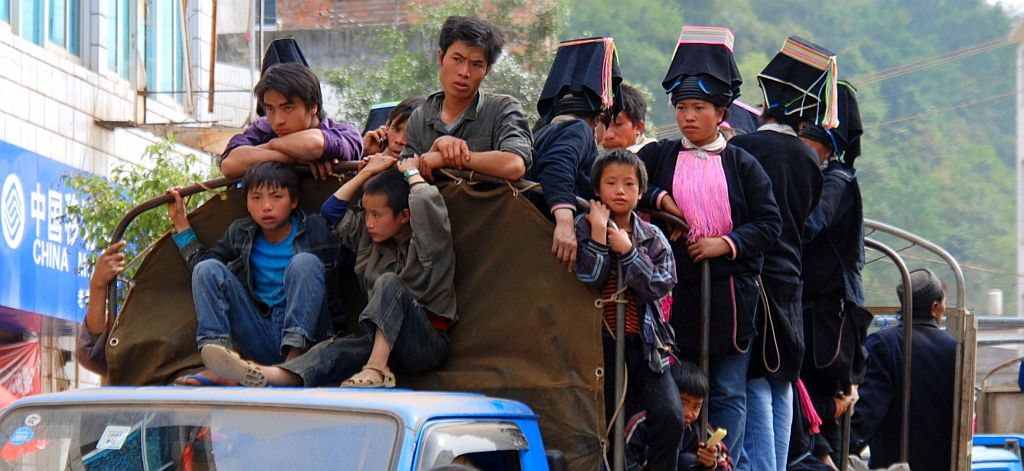
Yao on market day in Laomeng village

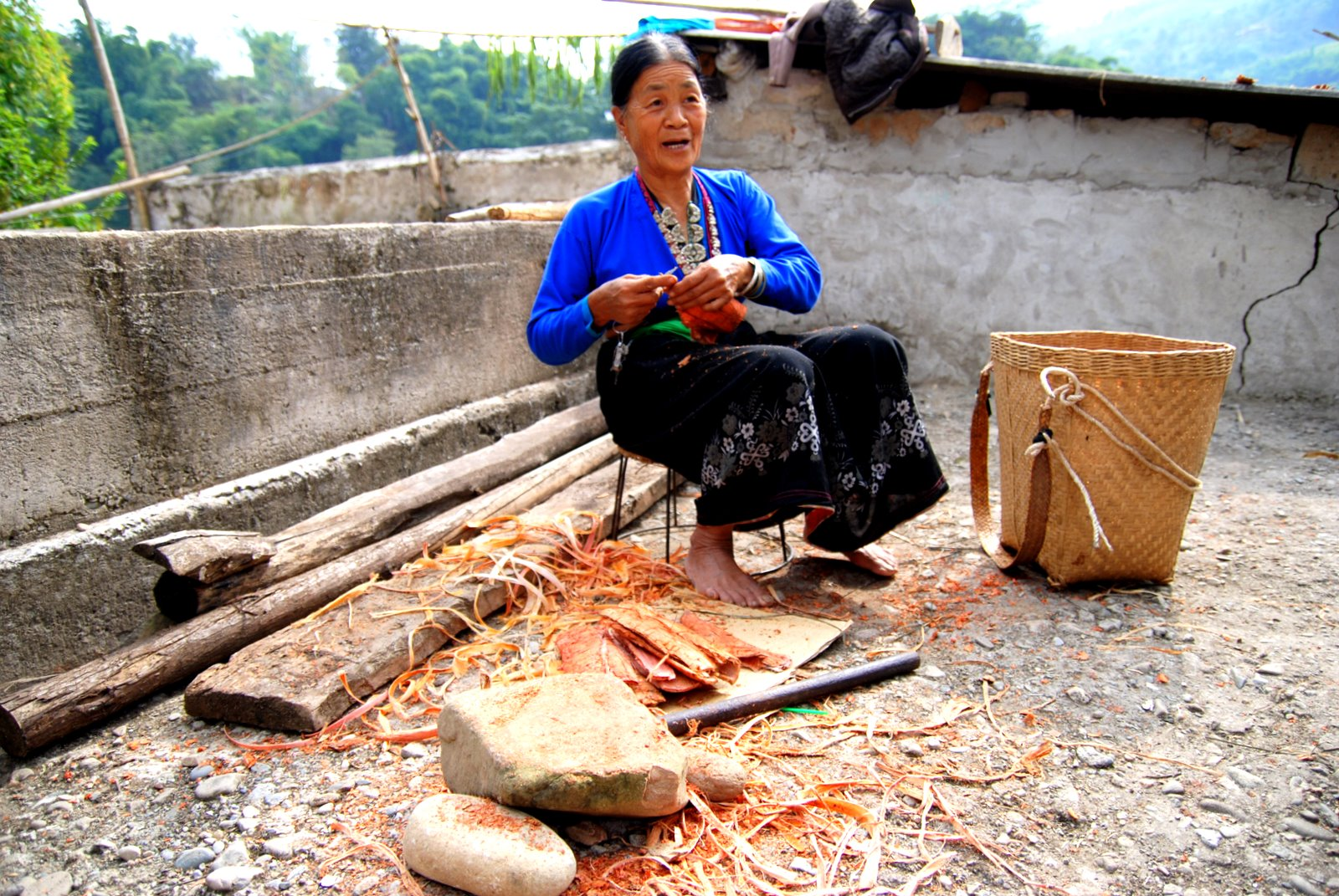
A Tai Dam lady in Laomeng village

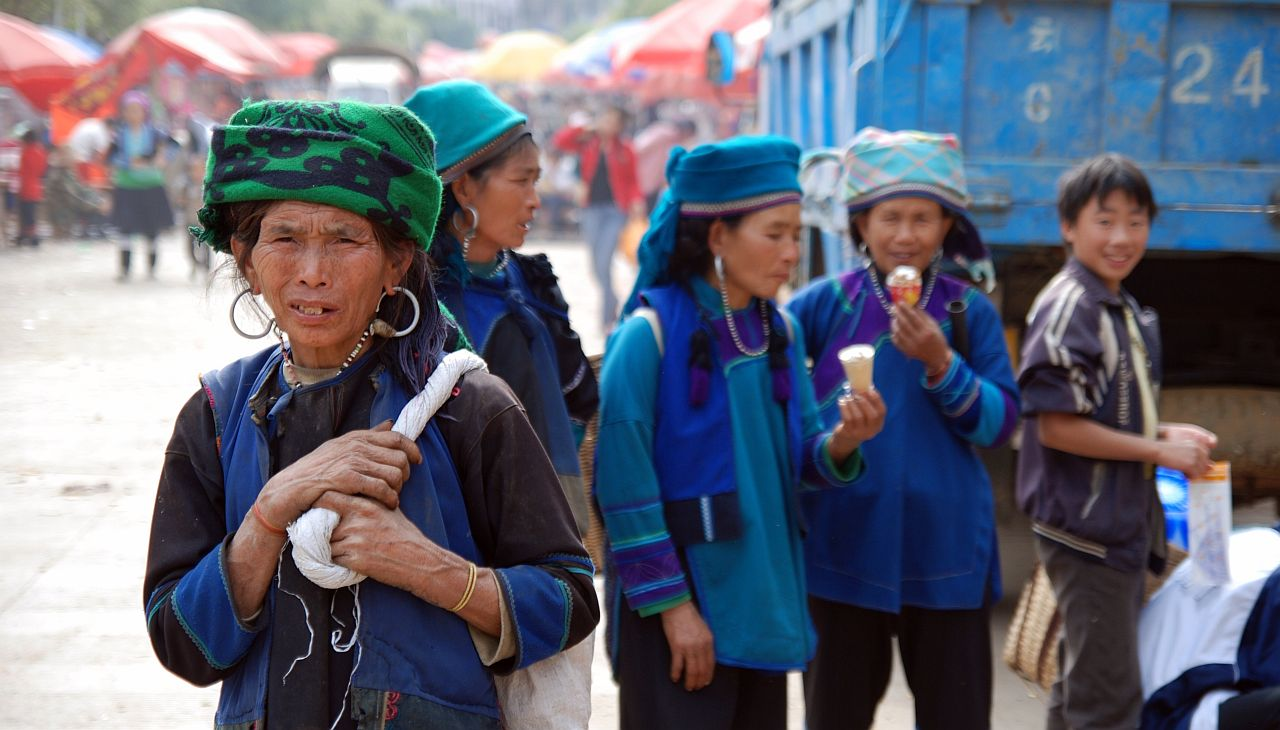
Hani ladies eating ice cream in Laomeng village during market day

== Climate ==
Climate data for Jinping, elevation 1,260 m (4,130 ft), (1991–2020 normals, extremes 1981–2010)
Month	Jan	Feb	Mar	Apr	May	Jun	Jul	Aug	Sep	Oct	Nov	Dec	Year
Record high °C (°F)	24.8 (76.6)	27.6 (81.7)	30.6 (87.1)	31.9 (89.4)	31.2 (88.2)	30.1 (86.2)	30.7 (87.3)	30.3 (86.5)	30.8 (87.4)	28.5 (83.3)	26.4 (79.5)	24.1 (75.4)	31.9 (89.4)
Mean daily maximum °C (°F)	17.0 (62.6)	19.4 (66.9)	22.7 (72.9)	25.0 (77.0)	25.6 (78.1)	25.4 (77.7)	25.3 (77.5)	25.9 (78.6)	25.5 (77.9)	23.2 (73.8)	20.6 (69.1)	17.4 (63.3)	22.8 (73.0)
Daily mean °C (°F)	12.6 (54.7)	14.4 (57.9)	17.5 (63.5)	20.0 (68.0)	21.5 (70.7)	22.0 (71.6)	21.8 (71.2)	21.7 (71.1)	20.8 (69.4)	18.9 (66.0)	15.9 (60.6)	12.9 (55.2)	18.3 (65.0)
Mean daily minimum °C (°F)	9.8 (49.6)	11.0 (51.8)	13.7 (56.7)	16.3 (61.3)	18.4 (65.1)	19.9 (67.8)	19.7 (67.5)	19.3 (66.7)	18.2 (64.8)	16.4 (61.5)	13.1 (55.6)	10.2 (50.4)	15.5 (59.9)
Record low °C (°F)	2.7 (36.9)	2.7 (36.9)	0.6 (33.1)	6.6 (43.9)	10.9 (51.6)	15.0 (59.0)	15.5 (59.9)	14.8 (58.6)	11.8 (53.2)	8.7 (47.7)	3.9 (39.0)	−0.3 (31.5)	−0.3 (31.5)
Average precipitation mm (inches)	50.3 (1.98)	40.2 (1.58)	83.2 (3.28)	140.1 (5.52)	279.7 (11.01)	406.0 (15.98)	505.1 (19.89)	365.3 (14.38)	195.5 (7.70)	150.3 (5.92)	71.2 (2.80)	45.8 (1.80)	2,332.7 (91.84)
Average precipitation days (≥ 0.1 mm)	8.4	7.8	9.3	13.4	19.8	26.2	27.2	25.1	19.6	15.2	8.5	6.7	187.2
Average snowy days	0.1	0	0	0	0	0	0	0	0	0	0	0	0.1
Average relative humidity (%)	84	79	75	77	81	88	89	88	86	85	84	84	83
Mean monthly sunshine hours	137.4	155.7	173.3	189.3	173.8	95.2	95.2	121.4	133.2	127.1	156.7	142.5	1,700.8
Percentage possible sunshine	41	48	46	50	42	24	23	31	36	36	48	43	39
Source: China Meteorological Administration
