= Lahu Christianity =

There are a number of Lahu Christian churches, some in each country where the Lahu live. The Lahu are an ethnic group that originated in Tibet and migrated into the Yunnan province of China, Myanmar, northern Thailand and Laos. Missionaries among the Lahu developed a Romanized phonetic alphabet for the Lahu in the beginning of the 19th century that was reformed by the Chinese government in 1957.

== China ==
Christianity was introduced to the Lahu in China early in the 20th century when they sent delegates to Burma to inquire about the Christian Faith. By 1936 the number of Lahu Christians was reported to be 33,650 with 100 churches. The number of Lahu Christians declined to about 20,000 in Yunnan during Japanese occupation during World War II, and more fled when Communist forces approached the region.

Living close to the border, there has been ready access to opium among the Lahu villagers in China, with opium addiction causing impoverishment and crimes. Because the government noticed that Lahu Christians generally did not smoke opium, beginning in 1992 the Chinese government facilitated the spread of Christianity among the Lahu. By 1993, it was reported that there were about 50,000 Lahu Christians in China and 24 churches. There has also been spread as some villages noticed the positive economic and health effects Christianity has had on other villages where they had relatives. The willingness of the government to facilitate such conversion is in part due to the ideological belief that monotheism is a natural stepping-stone from polytheism to Communism. At least some of these churches may not have fully absorbed core Christian doctrines such as the Trinity, as they use a term for a lesser deity in reference to Jesus.

== Myanmar ==
Lahu Christians from Myanmar (formerly known as Burma) have since World War II been evangelizing Lahu in other countries and the Akha and Wa in their own country. They have also opened their own seminary.

== Thailand ==
The Thailand Lahu Baptist Convention had roughly 8,130 members in 108 congregations as of 1998. There have also been Lahu members of the Church of the Nazarene in Thailand since five Lahu churches merged with the denomination in 1994 following evangelical work by Lahu from Myanmar.

== Other religions among the Lahu ==
Before the late 17th century, the Lahu religion was polytheistic. Buddhism was introduced in the late 17th century and became widespread.
