= Lawoish languages =

Proposed branch of Loloish languages

Lawoish
- Geographic distribution: Yunnan, China
- Linguistic classification: Sino-Tibetan: (Tibeto-Burman); Lolo–Burmese; Loloish; Central Loloish?; Lawoish

Language codes
- Glottolog: lawo1234

The Lawu languages or Lawoish languages are a proposed branch of Loloish languages. Internal classification within Loloish is uncertain. It may form a branch of Central Loloish, or it may be an independent branch of Loloish. The Lawu languages are:

- Lawu
- Awu
- Lewu

Cathryn Yang (2012) suggests that Lawu is most likely a Central Ngwi language, but notes that it does not classify with Lalo, Lahu, or the Lisoid (Lisu, Lipo, Lolopo) languages.
