= Nyi language =

Nyi (Gni), another transcription for Yi (I), may refer to any of several Loloish languages, such as,

- Sichuan Yi language
- Red Lahu language
