= Nậm Nhùn district =

Nậm Nhùn district Huyện Nậm Nhùn
- District
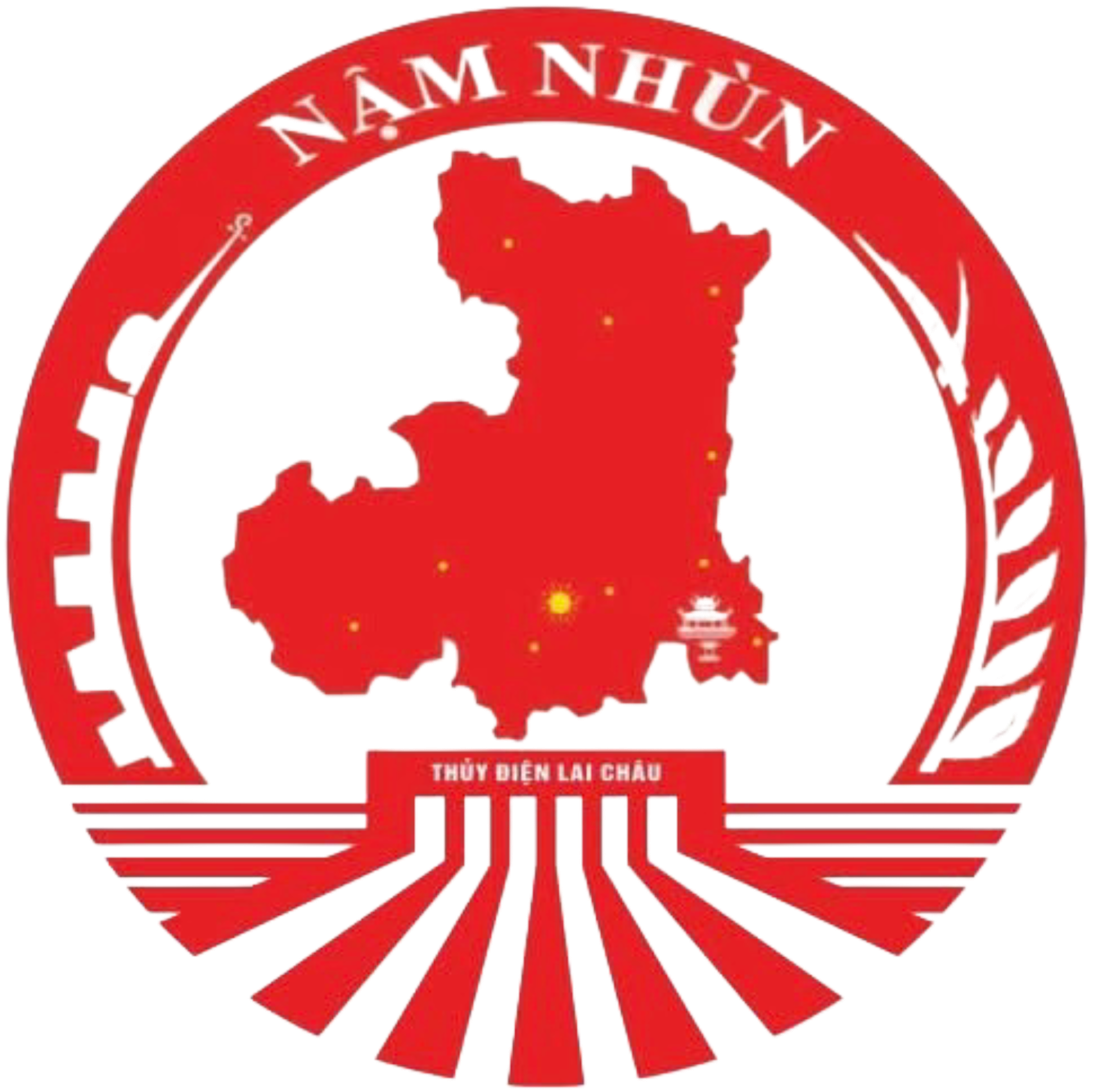
- Seal
- Interactive map of Nậm Nhùn district
- Country: Vietnam
- Region: Northwest
- Province: Lai Châu
- Capital: Nậm Nhùn

Area
  - Total: 535.94 sq mi (1,388.08 km^{2})

Population (2012)
  - Total: 24,165
- Time zone: UTC+7 (Indochina Time)

Nậm Nhùn is a former rural district of Lai Châu province in the Northwest region of Vietnam. As of 2012, the district had a population of 24,165. The district covers an area of 1,388.08 km^{2}. The district capital lies at Nậm Nhùn.

Nậm Nhùn district was formed from portions of Mường Tè district and Sìn Hồ district under Act No.71/NQ-CP/2012 of the Government of Vietnam on November 2, 2012.

The district is subdivided to 11 commune-level subdivisions, including Nậm Nhùn township and the rural communes of: Hua Bum, Mường Mô, Nậm Chà, Nậm Hàng, Nậm Manh, Pú Đao, Lê Lợi, Nậm Pì, Nậm Ban and Trung Chải.

== Geography ==
The district lies in the western part of Lai Châu Province, to the west of Sìn Hồ district and to the east of Mường Tè district. Nậm Nhùn town is the site of the Lai Châu Dam, inaugurated on December 20, 2016.
