= Central Loloish languages =

Sino-Tibetan language branch

Central Loloish
- Central Ngwi
- Geographic distribution: Southern China, Northern Vietnam, Northern Thailand, Laos, Myanmar
- Ethnicity: Yi people
- Linguistic classification: Sino-Tibetan: (Tibeto-Burman); Lolo–Burmese; Loloish; Central Loloish

Language codes
- Glottolog: None

The Central Loloish languages, also known as Central Ngwi, is a branch of Loloish languages in Bradley (1997). It is not used in Lama's (2012) classification. Central Loloish is also not supported in Satterthwaite-Phillips' (2011) computational phylogenetic analysis of the Lolo-Burmese languages.

== Languages ==
Lama (2012) considers Central Loloish to be paraphyletic, and splits up Bradley's (1997) Central Loloish into the following independent branches of Loloish. The Lawu language group has been added from Yang (2012) and Hsiu (2017).

- Lisoish languages: Lisu, Lolopo, Lipo, Lalo, Taloid languages, etc.
- Nusoish languages: Nusu, Zauzou (Rouruo)
- Lahoish languages: Lahu, Kucong
- Lawoish languages: Lawu, Awu, Lewu
- Jinuo

Lisoish is the largest and most diverse group. Jinuo is classified as a Hanoish (Southern Loloish) language in Lama (2012).

== Innovations ==
Pelkey (2011:367) lists the following as Central Ngwi innovations.

- Proto-Ngwi tone categories 1 and 2: tone splitting that is widespread
- Proto-Ngwi tone category 2 splits to *glottal-prefixed initials (higher-pitched reflexes) and *non-glottal-prefixed initials (lower-pitched reflexes; with a subsequent flip-flop in Lahu)
- Proto-Ngwi tone category L prefixed stop initials > high/rising pitch reflexes
- Family group classifiers paradigmatized with disyllabic forms, vowel leveling, and other systemic changes
- Burmic extensive paradigm is moderately grammaticalized; more than Southern Ngwi, but fewer than Northern Ngwi
- Lexical innovations for 'dog' and 'fire'
