= Đông Pao mine =

Rare earths mine in Vietnam

Dong Pao mine
- Interactive map of Dong Pao mine
- Location: Lai Châu Province, Vietnam; 22°16′0″N 103°32′59″E
- Products: Rare earths

The Dong Pao mine is one of the largest rare earths mines in Vietnam. The mine is located in northern Vietnam, in Sìn Hồ District of Lai Châu Province. The mine has reserves amounting to 7 million tonnes of ore grading 5% RE, located in a syenite intrusion.

Until about 2015, the mine had been operated by two Japanese firms, Toyota Tsusho and Sojitz; however operations ceased when the Chinese flooded the rare-earth market lowering prices.

== Dong Pao Revival 2023 ==
In 2023, Australian mining company Black Stone Minerals and Vietnam Rare Earth announced they were preparing to bid for a licence to operate the Dong Pao mine. Two weeks later, however, several key executives at VRE were arrested for tax evasion. This saw the US Geological Survey halve its expected output for Vietnam in 2023 from 1,200 tons of rare earths to just 600 tons.
