= LWU =

LWU or lwu may refer to:

- Literatur in Wissenschaft und Unterricht, a journal of English and German literary / cultural studies, publishing in both languages.
- Lao Women's Union, a women's rights organization established in Laos
- lwu, the ISO 639-3 code for Lawu language, Yunnan, China
