= Nậm Hàng =

Nậm Hàng Xã Nậm Hàng
- Commune
- Nậm Hàng commune
- Location within Vietnam
- Coordinates: 22°08′49″N 103°00′25″E
- Country: Vietnam
- Region: Northwest
- Province: Lai Châu
- Time zone: UTC+7 (UTC + 7)

Nậm Hàng is a commune (xã) of Lai Châu Province, Vietnam.

On 16 June 2025, the Standing Committee of the National Assembly promulgated a Resolution on the rearrangement of commune-level administrative units of Lai Châu Province in 2025. Accordingly, the entire natural area and population of Nậm Nhùn Township, Nậm Manh Commune, and Nậm Hàng Commune are rearranged to form a new commune named Nậm Hàng Commune.
