= Lahu language =

Loloish language spoken in Asia

Lahu
- Ladhof
- Native to: Yunnan, China; Thailand; Laos; Myanmar; Vietnam
- Ethnicity: Lahu
- Native speakers: 600,000 (2007–2012)
- Language family: Sino-Tibetan: (Tibeto-Burman); Lolo–Burmese; Loloish; (Lahoish); Lahu
- Writing system: Latin script

Official status
- Official language in: Lancang Lahu Autonomous County, Yunnan

Language codes
- ISO 639-3: Variously: lhu – Lahu lhi – Lahu Shi lkc – Kucong
- Glottolog: laho1234

Lahu (endonym: Ladhof, pronounced [lɑ˥˧xo˩]) is a Tibeto-Burman language spoken by the Lahu people of China, Thailand, Myanmar, Vietnam and Laos. It is widely used in China, both by Lahu people, and by other ethnic minorities in Yunnan, who use it as a lingua franca. However, the language is not widely used nor taught in any schools in Thailand, where many Lahu are refugees and illegal immigrants, having crossed into Thailand from Myanmar.

== Distribution by dialect ==
Lahu Na (Black Lahu) is the northern and standard Lahu dialect and is spoken in most of Yunnan, China, in the Kengtung District of Shan State, Myanmar, and in Thailand. It should not be confused with Lahu Aga (the Black Lahu of Laos) or Kucong (the Black Lahu of Vietnam).

Lahu Phu (White Lahu) is the southern dialect of the Lahu language. It is spoken in 3 countries: China, Vietnam and Laos, including in Muong Te District of Lai Châu Province.

Lahu Nyi (Red Lahu) is only spoken in Thailand, including in the southern Yala Province.

Lahu Aga (Black Lahu) is spoken in Bokeo Province and Yunnan (Xishuangbanna).

Lahu Shi (Yellow Lahu) is spoken in the following regions:

- China: Menghai County, Lancang County, other areas of Yunnan.
- Myanmar: Kengtung District
- Laos: Luang Namtha Province and Bokeo Province
- Thailand: Chiang Mai Province, Nan Province, Chiang Rai Province, Phayao Province and Tak Province.

In Thailand, Lahu is spoken in the following provinces:

- Chiang Mai Province
- Chiang Rai Province
- Mae Hong Son Province
- Kamphaeng Phat Province
- Yala Province.

In Laos, Lahu is spoken in the following locations:

- Bokeo province: Houayxay, Peung, and Ton pheung districts
- Luang Namtha province: Long district.

== Classification ==
The Lahu language, along with the closely related Kucong language, is classified as a separate branch of Loloish by Ziwo Lama (2012), but as a Central Loloish language by David Bradley (2007). Lahu is classified as a sister branch of the Southern Loloish branch in Satterthwaite-Phillips' (2011) computational phylogenetic analysis of the Lolo-Burmese languages.

== Dialects ==
=== Matisoff (2006) ===
A few dialects are noted, which are each known by a variety of names:

- Lahu Na (Black Lahu, Musser Dam, Northern Lahu, Loheirn)
- Lahu Shi (Yellow Lahu, Kutsung); the divergent la53 xu31 sɯ33 dialect is spoken in Nanduan 南段村 (Lahu: na31 tɔ35) Village, Nuofu Township 糯福乡, Lancang County, China
- Lahu Nyi (Red Lahu, Southern Lahu, Musseh Daeng, Luhishi, Luhushi), Shehleh
- Lahu Shehleh

=== Pham (2013) ===
Phạm Huy (2013:13) lists the following 3 branches.

- La Hủ Phu (White Lahu): only found in Lüchun County, Yunnan, China
- La Hủ Năk (Black Lahu)
- La Hủ Nê Thu

=== Yunnan (1998) ===
Yunnan (1998:280) lists 5 Lahu dialects.

- Lancang (standard) dialect 澜沧标准音区片 (in most of Lancang, Ximeng, Menglian, Cangyuan, and Shuangjiang counties)
- Nanmei dialect 南美土语群片 (in Nanmei Township 南美乡, Lincang County; Gengma County, and other nearby areas)
- Mojiang dialect 墨江土语群片 (in Pu'er, Simao, Mojiang, Xinping counties, etc.; Lahu Shi)
- Menghai dialect 勐海土语群片 (in Menghai, Jinghong, Mengla, Lancang counties (in Jiujing 酒井, Yakou 雅口, Qianliu 谦六 townships, etc.); Lahu Shi)
- Jinping-Lüchun dialect 金绿土语群片 (in Jinping and Lüchun counties)

Traditionally Lahu folk taxonomy splits the Lahu people into the two groups of Black Lahu and Yellow Lahu; Red Lahu and White Lahu are new dialect clusters originating in messianic movements within the past few centuries. Black Lahu is the standard dialect in China, as well as the lingua franca among different groups of Lahu in Thailand. However, it is intelligible to speakers of Yellow Lahu only with some difficulty.

=== Bradley (1979) ===
Based on the numbers of shared lexical items, Bradley (1979) classifies the Lahu dialects as follows:

Common Lahu

- Black Lahu
  - Shehleh
  - (Core)
    - Black Lahu proper
    - Red Lahu
- Yellow Lahu
  - Bakeo
  - Banlan

=== Lama (2012) ===
Lama (2012) gives the following tentative classification for what he calls Lahoid.

Lahoid

- Lahu-Xi (Yellow Lahu)
- (Black Lahu cluster)
  - Lahu-Na (Black Lahu)
  - Lahu-Ni (Red Lahu)
  - Lahu-Pu (White Lahu)
  - Lahu-Shehleh

=== Jin (2007) ===
Jin Youjing (2007) classifies the Lahu dialects as follows.

- Lahu Na 拉祜纳 (Black Lahu 黑拉祜): about 80% of all Lahu
  - Xia'nanxian 下南现 (Nanling Township 南岭乡) dialect
  - Dongkahe 东卡河 (Laba Township 拉巴乡) dialect
- Lahu Xi 拉祜西 (Yellow Lahu 黄拉祜): about 20% of all Lahu
  - Northern dialect: Donghe 东河, Xincheng 新城, Qianliu 谦六, Wendong 文东, Fudong 富东, and Dashan 大山 townships
  - Central dialect: Yakou 雅口, Qianmai 谦迈, and Yingpan 营盘 townships
  - Southern dialect: Southern Nuofu 糯福(南), Northern Nuofu 糯福(北), and Huimin 惠民 townships
- Lahu Alai 拉祜阿莱: located in Alai Dazhai 阿莱大寨, Fubang Township 富邦乡, Lancang County and a few other nearby villages
- Kucong 苦聪: located in Jinping, Lüchun, Zhenyuan, and other counties

Jin Youjing (1992) covers Lahu linguistic geography and dialectology in detail.

=== Heh (2008) ===
Heh (2008) lists Lahu Shi (Yellow Lahu) dialects as:

- Mikeng
- Nakeo
- Lahu Aga (also called Aphubele; spoken in Laos)
- Bakeo
- Balan

Lahu Aga was classified as Lahu Shi by Bradley (1979), but Heh (2008) found that it is actually linguistically closer to Lahu Na (Black Lahu). In Laos, there are about 9,000 Lahu Aga located in Bokeo Province (Tonpheung district, Muang Muang district, Houj Xai district, and the special region of Nam Yut) and Luang Namtha Province (Vieng Phoukha district, Boten district, and Muang Long district) (Heh 2008:161). In Laos, the Lahu Aga are most numerous in Tonpheung district (in Baan Dong Keap, Baan Sam Sip, Baan Khi Lek, Baan Beu Neong, Baan Hoe Ong, and Baan Nan Fa villages) and Vieng Phoukha district (in Baan Na Kat Tai, Baan Na Kat Neua, Baan Pamak, Baan NaNoi, Baan NaVa, Baan NaPhe, and Baan Na Shin villages) (Heh 2008:161-162). The Yellow Lahu are also called Lahu Kui Lung in Laos (Schliesinger (2003:110), with Kui meaning 'people'. There are about 21 Lahu Aga villages in Bokeo and Luang Namtha provinces, including in Ban Don Keao, Bokeo, and Ban Na Kat Neua, who had originally migrated from Yunnan, China. (Heh 2008:8). There are also 11 Lahu Aga families living in Baan Son Pu Nong, Chiang Saen District, Chiang Rai Province, Thailand. Heh (2008) provides comparative Lahu Aga dialectal data for:

- Na Kat Neua village, Vieng Phoukha district, Luang Namtha province
- Don Keao village, Tonpheung district, Bokeo province
- Na Kha village, Muang Muang Township, Bokeo province

== Phonology ==
=== Consonants ===
		Labial	Dental/ Alveolar	Palatal	Velar	Uvular/ Glottal
Plosive	voiceless	p	t	c	k	q
Plosive	aspirated	pʰ	tʰ	cʰ	kʰ	qʰ
Plosive	voiced	b	d	ɟ	ɡ	
Fricative	voiceless	f		ʃ	(x)	h
Fricative	voiced	v			ɣ	
Nasal		m	n		ŋ	
Approximant			l	j		

- Palatal consonant sounds when occurring before a close central vowel /cɨ, cʰɨ, ɟɨ, ʃɨ, jɨ/ are heard as dental affricate sounds [tsɹ̩, tsʰɹ̩, dzɹ̩, sɹ̩, zɹ̩]. Stop sounds may also be heard as palato-alveolar sounds [tʃ, tʃʰ, dʒ] elsewhere, in free variation.
- /h/ may also be heard as a velar fricative [x], in free variation.
- /n/ before /i/, can be articulated as a palatal nasal [ɲ].
- Labial sounds before a close back vowel /pu, pʰu, bu, mu/ have affricated variants, heard as [pfɯ, pfʰɯ, bvɯ, mvɯ].

=== Vowels ===
	Front	Central	Back
Close	i	ɨ	u
Mid	e	ə	o
Open	ɛ	a	ɔ

- When following palatal or labial consonants, /ɨ, u/ have special allophones [ɹ̩, ɯ].

=== Tones ===
Name	Symbol	Pitch
Mid	33	˧
High-rising	35	˦˥
High-falling	53	˥˧
Low-falling	21	˨˩
Very low	11	˩
High-checked	54ʔ	˥˧ʔ
Low-checked	21ʔ	˨˩ʔ

== Sound changes ==
Lama (2012) lists the following sound changes from Proto-Loloish as Lahu innovations.

- *s-l- > x-
- *z- > dz-
- *ŋ- > x-

== Writing system ==
There are three alphabets based on the Latin script for Lahu:

- Protestant alphabet: used in Myanmar, Laos and Thailand.
- Catholic alphabet: in Myanmar.
- Pinyin in China.

=== Protestant alphabet ===
The first Lahu alphabet was created by American Protestant missionaries C. B. Antisdel and H. H. Tilbe in Myanmar. . They began work on creating an alphabet for the Black Lahu in 1906, and published the first book in it in 1908. This alphabet was based on the Latin script and included only the letters of the standard Latin alphabet. In the first version of this alphabet, tones were unmarked, but in 1917, tone marks were introduced. In 1921, this alphabet has also spread to the Lahu of China. Some changes were made to the Protestant alphabet in 1950 and 1962. It is currently the main alphabet for the Lahu of Myanmar and Thailand.

In 1982, Yellow Lahu refugees from Laos living in the United States developed an orthography for writing their language, also based on the Protestant alphabet. It soon found use among the Yellow Lahu of Southeast Asia. At the same time, Black Lahu often feel that Yellow Lahu do not need their own orthography and are better off using the more established and widely used Black Lahu orthography.

- Initials: p, hp, b, m, f, v, pf, hpf, bv, mv, w, t, ht, d, n, ny, l, ts, tc, tz, s, z, c, ch, j, sh, y, k, hk, g, ng, h, g', k', hk'.
- Finals: i, e, eh, a, u, aw, o, ui, uh, ya, yao, yu, ai, ao, wi, aweh.
- Tones are marked with ˉ ˅ ˯ _ ˄ ˰.

=== Catholic alphabet ===
In the 1930s, Catholic missionaries in Burma developed their own version of the Lahu alphabet. This alphabet had many features in common with the Protestant alphabet, but there were significant differences in the representation of the finals. The Catholic alphabet did not gain widespread use, but is still used today among Lahu Catholics in Myanmar.

- Initials: q, qh, k, kh, g, ng, c, tc, ch, ts, j, dz, t, th, d, n, gn, p, pf, ph, phf, b, bv, m, mv, h, gh, sh, s, y, z, f, v, l.
- Finals: a, e, ë, è, i, o, ö, ò, u, ü, ae, ao.
- Tones are marked with _ ⌏ ⌍ ˯ ˄ ˰.

=== Pinyin ===
In 1952, the People's Republic of China closed all foreign Christian missions in the Lahu region. After this, it was decided to reform the existing Protestant alphabet. Work on a new version of the script began in 1953. After the new alphabet was reviewed by Chinese and Soviet scientists, as well as government bodies, it was approved in March 1957. The graphic basis of the new alphabet was the official system of romanization of Chinese writing - pinyin. The most important difference from the Protestant alphabet was the designation of tones not by special signs, but by letters l d q r t f after a syllable. Due to the Cultural Revolution and its aftermath from 1964 to 1980, the Lahu alphabet was not used in China, but was later revived. In 1989, minor changes were made to this alphabet. It is currently the official script for Lahu in China.

- Initials: p, ph, b, m, f, v, w, t, th, d, n, l, z, zh, dz, s, r, c, ch, j, sh, y, k, kh, g, ng, h, x, q, qh.
- Finals: i, e, i.e., a, u, aw, o, eu, eo, ia, iao, iu, ei, ai, ao, ui, uai, ou.
- Tones are marked with letters l, d, q, r, t, f. The final eo and the letter f (as a tone marker) were introduced in 1989.

=== Correspondence chart ===
Initials:

Protestant	Catholic	Pinyin	IPA	Protestant	Catholic	Pinyin	IPA	Protestant	Catholic	Pinyin	IPA
p			[p]	ht	th		[th]	sh			[ɕ, ʃ]
hp	ph		[pʰ]	d			[d]	y			[ʑ, ʒ]
b			[b]	n/ny	n/gn	n	[n, ɲ]	k			[k]
m			[m]	l			[l]	hk	kh		[kʰ]
f			[f]	ts		z	[ts]	g			[g]
v			[v]	tc		zh	[tsʰ]	ng			[ŋ]
pf		p	[pɣ]	tz	dz		[dz]	h			[x]
hpf	phf	ph	[pɣʰ]	s			[s]	g'	gh	x	[ɣ]
bv		b	[bɣ]	z		r	[z]	k'	q		[q]
mv		m	[ɱɣ]	c			[tɕ, tʃ]	hk'	qh		[qʰ]
w	-	w	[w]	ch			[tɕʰ, tʃʰ]				
t			[t]	j			[dʑ, dʒ]				

- {p, pʰ, b, m} → {pɣ, pɣʰ, bɣ, mɣ} / _ u
- {tɕ, tɕʰ, dʑ, ɕ, ʑ} → {ts, tsʰ, dz, s, z} / _ {ɨ}
- {tɕ, tɕʰ, dʑ, ɕ, ʑ} → {tʃ, tʃʰ, dʒ, ʃ, ʒ} / _ V, V ∉ {i, e, ɛ, ɨ}
- {n} → {ɲ} / _ i

Finals:

Protestant	Catholic	Pinyin	IPA	Protestant	Catholic	Pinyin	IPA	Protestant	Catholic	Pinyin	IPA	Protestant	Catholic	Pinyin	IPA
i			[i]	o			[u]	ya	?	ia	[iɐ]	wi	?	ui	[ui]
e			[e]	ui	ü	eu	[ɨ]	yao	?	iao	[iɐo]	-	?	ua	[uɐ]
eh	è	ie	[ɛ]	eu	ë	eo	[ɤ]	yu	?	iu	[io]	aweh	-	uai	[uɐi]
a			[ɐ]	uh	ö	u	[ɯ]	-	?	ei	[ei]	-	?	ou	[ou]
u			[ʉ]	uh	ö	i	[ɾ]	ai	ae	ai	[ɐi]				
aw	ò	aw	[ɔ]					ao			[ɐo]				

- /u/ → [ɯ] / {pɣ, pɣʰ, bɣ, mɣ} _
- /ɨ/ → [ɾ] / {ts, tsʰ, dz, s, z} _

Tones (for Protestant and catholic alphabets examples with a):

Tone	Protestant	Catholic	Pinyin
Mid	Unmarked	a_	Unmarked
Mid; Rising	aˉ	a⌏	q
High; Falling	a˅	a⌍	d
Mid; Falling	a˯	a˯	l
Low	a_	Unmarked	f
High; Level	a˄	a˄	t
Low; Falling	a˰	a˰	r

== Grammar ==
=== Brief overview ===
Lahu grammar is highly analytic. The basic word order is verb final. Particles carry much of the language's grammatical information, occurring at the end of phrases and both subordinate and main clauses, marking both clause type, as well as various aspectual and modal meanings. Multiverb constructions are frequently used to express complex events, and also have aspectual or valency altering functions.

=== Nouns and the noun phrase ===
Nouns may be monomorphemic, or be composed of a root plus an affix, such as gender marking suffixes, and several noun forming prefixes, which in some cases derive a noun from a verb root. The most common of these prefixes is ɔ̀-, which may historically have functioned as a more productive nominaliser, and also a marker of possession. Reduplication of nouns can have a few different meanings, such as indicating collectivity (all), emphasis, or distributivity. Nouns do not inflect for number or case, though pronouns make a three way number distinction between singular, dual, and plural. Nouns, pronouns, and demonstratives may be modified by a following numeral+classifier; classifiers are almost always used with numerals, the only exceptions being counting in the abstract, and doing maths. Classifiers encode information about the kind of noun being counted, or the measurement/quantity of it. For example, g̈â is the classifier used when counting people, câʔ is used for string-like objects, and khɛ̂ for cupfuls of a substance. Round numerals like chi "ten", and ha "hundred", are also classifiers, as are some units of time, like ni "day", and qhɔ̀ʔ "year". Demonstratives distinguish three degrees of deixis, and there are also two which encode either high or low elevation. There is also a demonstrative chi which functions similarly to a definite article. Adjectives are a type of verb in Lahu, and cannot directly modify a noun as they do in English, instead, a relative clause must be used, so instead of good seats, a structure similar to seats that (are) good would be used. Within the noun phrase, possessors precede possessums, separated from them by the particle ve, though the particle may sometimes be omitted, and this is always possible when the possessor is pronominal. Sometimes, an ɔ̀- prefix on the possessum may also be omitted. There is a particle that follows objects, thàʔ, which is optional, usually used to clear up ambiguity or add emphasis. It may also follow complement clauses, and it is common after recipient objects, as these are usually human, and prone to being interpreted as the verb's agent. To specify locations, spatial nouns or locative particles may be used.

=== Verbs and the verb phrase ===
Verb phrases consist of at least one verb, though many consist of two or more. Multiple verbs in sequence in a single verb phrase can encode distinct actions seen as part of a complex event, indicate both an action and its result (e.g. g̈ɔ̀ tɔ̂ʔ "pull emerge", meaning "pull out"), add aspectual information such as with pə̀ "finish", and can be used for meaning encoded with subordinate clauses which use to in English, like help to or teach to. They can also increase a verb phrase's valency, by adding a causee with a verb such as cɨ "send on an errand" or pî "give", though pî "give" may also add a third person benefactor, while lâ "come" adds a first or second person benefactor. Some verb roots are historically related to other verb roots, one being a causative of the other, such as dɔ̀ "drink" and tɔ "give to drink", similar to English verb pairs like sit and set. Particles come at the end of the verb phrase, and can mark direction of movement, reciprocity, and aspectual or modal meanings like completion, ongoing duration, desire, beginning, future/irrealis, and various particles that make a statement into a command. Unlike particles, adverbs precede the verb(s) in the verb phrase, and include the negator mâ. As mâ can be used to negate adjectives, they are considered a subclass of verbs in Lahu.

=== Structure of the simple clause ===
The verb phrase comes at the end of the clause, and is the only obligatory element of a Lahu clause; overt arguments are often dropped if obvious from context, and their order relative to each other is somewhat fluid. Locational or temporal reference usually precede noun phrases functioning as arguments, and content interrogative words normally come directly before the verb phrase. The word yɔ̂/yò is used for equational nominal predicates, while to form a negative equational predicate, mâ hêʔ is used. Sentence final particles are extremely common, and often multiple occur. They can mark a sentence as being a statement, a request, or a question, with different particles being used for polar vs content questions, along with particles expressing doubt that the statement is true, or marking it as having been said by someone other than the speaker.

=== Complex clauses ===
In addition to the noun forming prefixes mentioned earlier, Lahu also has nominalising particles, which follow a clause, allowing it to function like a noun. Different particles make the nominalised clause refer to different participants, such as the performer of the action, the location, the time, or something used for carrying out the action. There is also a particle which renders a nominalisation referring to the event itself, ve, the same morpheme used in adnominal possession. Clauses nominalised by it modify a noun in a noun phrase, functioning as a relative clause. Nominalised clauses functioning as relative clauses usually precede the noun, though they may follow it if the verb has an adjectival meaning. Clauses nominalised with ve also function as complement clauses. Coordinated or adverbial clauses are also linked to a following clause with a final particle, encoding conditional, temporal, and causal linkage, among others.

== Vocabulary ==
Here are some common Lahu words.

IPA	Gloss
tɔ̀-kɔ=ya	Akha
qhɔ̀ʔ-la	ash
khɛ̂	bowl
nû	cow
nû-ɛ́	calf
kâlâ=g̈ ɔ̂-ma	carrot (lit. foreign vegetable)
cê-lê	clerk
pa-lûʔ ~ pa-lú	catfish
mɔ	show
a-ví	sibling
hɔ́-yɛ	temple
yò	yes
qhɔ̀ʔ	year

== See also ==
- Kucong language

== Sources ==
- Bradley, David (1979). Lahu dialects. Oriental monograph series #23. Canberra: Faculty of Asian Studies, Australian National University. OCLC 6303582.
- Matisoff, James A. (2006). English-Lahu Lexicon. Berkeley, California: University of California Press. ISBN 0-520-09855-2.
- Phạm Huy (1997). Một phần chân dung: dân tộc La Hủ (nhật ký điền dã). Lai Châu: Sở văn hóa thông tin Lai Châu.
- Reh, Louis (August 2005). "Silenced Minorities". The Irrawaddy. Archived from the original on 2006-01-27.
