= Lawu language =

Endangered Loloish language of China

Lawu
- Pronunciation: la21 wu21
- Native to: China
- Region: Yunnan
- Native speakers: 50 (2012)
- Language family: Sino-Tibetan: (Tibeto-Burman); Lolo–Burmese; Loloish; Central Loloish?; Lawoish; Lawu

Language codes
- ISO 639-3: lwu
- Glottolog: lawu1238

Lawu (autonym: la21 wu21) is a highly endangered unclassified Loloish language of Yunnan, China. It has about 50 elderly speakers in Jiuha village 旧哈村, Shuitang district 水塘镇, Xinping County, Yuxi Prefecture, Yunnan Province. There are possibly also some speakers in Jiujia District 九甲乡, Zhenyuan County, Pu'er Prefecture, Yunnan Province. Lawu speakers are currently classified by the Chinese government as Lahu, but were formerly classified as Yi.

== Classification ==
Cathryn Yang (2012) suggests that Lawu is most likely a Central Ngwi language, but notes that it does not classify with Lalo, Lahu, or the Lisoid (Lisu, Lipo, Lolopo) languages.

Andrew Hsiu (2017) suggests that Lawu is related to Awu of Xiaopingzi 小坪子, Daping Township 大坪乡, Yuanyang County, Yunnan, China, which is documented in Lu & Lu (2011). Together, Lawu and Awu form a Lawu or Lawoish language branch. The linguistic evidence suggests that the ancestors of the Awu had migrated down the Red River valley from further up northwest, and arrived at their present location after migrating downstream.

Lewu, which is currently extinct, may have been related to Lawu, but classification is uncertain due to the paucity of data.

== Phonology ==
Consonants
	Labial	Alveolar	Palatal	Velar
Plosive	pʰ p	tʰ t		kʰ k
Affricate		tsʰ ts	tɕʰ tɕ	
Fricative	f v	s z	ɕ	x
Nasal	m	n		ŋ
Approximant	w	l	j	

- /n/ is pronounced [ɲ] before the vowels /i e/.

Vowels
	Front	Central	Back
High	i		u
Mid	e	ə	o
Low		a	

- /i/ is realised as an apical vowel [z̩] after the alveolar affricates and fricatives /tsʰ ts s z/.

Additionally, the following diphthongs have been observed: /ue/, /ie/, /au/, /ai/, /ua/.

Lawu also has four tones; high, mid, low, and falling.
