= Nuobi language =

Loloish language spoken in Yunnan, China

Nuobi
- Luobi
- Native to: China
- Language family: Sino-Tibetan: (Tibeto-Burman); Lolo–Burmese; Loloish; Southern; Hani; Nuobi

Language codes
- ISO 639-3: None (mis)
- Glottolog: luob1237

Nuobi (autonym: Lolbiq; lu21 pi33 or lo˥bi˨˩ in Jinping County meaning 'downriver'; Chinese: 糯比 Luobi (Lobi)) is a Loloish language of south-central Yunnan, China.

== Distribution ==
Nuobi is spoken in:

- Xinping Yi and Dai Autonomous County
- Yuanjiang Hani, Yi and Dai Autonomous County
- Jinping Miao, Yao, and Dai Autonomous County

Dai (2009) reports that ethnic Hani in Yangjie Township (羊街乡), Yuanjiang County belong to the Nuomei (糯美) and Nuobi (糯比) subgroups, who number 9,000 people and 6,000 people respectively in the township. The Nuomei live mostly in Gedie (戈垤), Dangduo (党舵) (which also has Kucong speakers), and Bamu (坝木) administrative villages, while the Nuobi reside mostly in Langzhi (朗支) (which also has Yi speakers in Zhongliangzi 中梁子), Yangjie (羊街), and Diexia (垤霞) (including Yidie, 依垤) villages.

== Vocabulary ==
The following basic vocabulary word list of Nuobi is from the Xinping County Ethnic Gazetteer (1992:209–210).

English gloss	Chinese gloss	Nuobi
One	一	tʰi³³
Two	二	ȵĩ³¹
Three	三	si³³
Four	四	ji̱³¹
Sky	天	mu³¹
Ground	地	mĩ⁵⁵
Day	日	mu⁵⁵tʂɑ³³
Month	月	bᴀ³¹lɑ³¹
Mountain	山	xɑŋ³³tʰɑ³³
Water	水	ɑ⁵⁵kʰᴀ
River	河流	lo²¹bᴀ²¹ɑ⁵⁵kʰᴀ²¹
Sea	海	bᴀ³³mo̱³³
Fire	火	ɑ⁵⁵tso²¹
Long	长	mɑ̃³¹
Short	短	mũ³¹
Red	红	nɨ⁵⁵
Black	黑	nɑ³¹
Come, to	来	ko³³lɑi³¹
Go, to	去	li³¹mɛ³³
Say, to	说	je³¹
Hit, to	打	dze⁵⁵
New	新的	xɑŋ³³sə³¹
True	真的	tseŋ³³sə³¹
Tell, to	告诉	je³³do̱³¹
Soul	灵魂	jiɑ⁵⁵ɬɑ⁵⁵
Radio	收音机	tʂau³³jiŋ³³tsi³³
Electric light	电灯	tian³⁵teŋ³³
