= Lewu language =

Extinct Loloish language of Yunnan, China

Lewu
- Native to: China
- Region: Yunnan
- Ethnicity: Yao
- Extinct: 1985
- Language family: Sino-Tibetan: (Tibeto-Burman); Lolo–Burmese; Loloish; Central Loloish?; Lawoish?; Lewu

Language codes
- ISO 639-3: None (mis)
- Glottolog: None

Lewu 乐舞 is an unclassified extinct Loloish language of Jingdong Yi Autonomous County, Yunnan, China. The Lewu are officially classified by the Chinese government as ethnic Yao people.

== Demographics ==
According to the Jingdong County Gazetteer (1994:519), ethnic Yao numbered 3,889 individuals in 1990, and lived mainly in Chaqing 岔箐 and Dasongshu 大松树 Villages of Taizhong Township 太忠乡. Yao language speakers, known as the Lewu Yao 乐舞瑶族, are found in Puya Village 普牙村, Chaqing Township 岔箐乡 (Jingdong County Ethnic Gazetteer 2012:144).

== Classification ==
Lewu may have been related to the Lawu language of Xinping County, Yunnan, but classification remains uncertain due to the paucity of data.

== Vocabulary ==
A word list of the Lewu Yao language is transcribed using pinyin in the Jingdong County Ethnic Gazetteer (2012:144-145). The language is already extinct, and was recorded in 1985 from 85-year-old Zhu Zhaojin 祝兆金 of Puya Village 普牙村, who could remember only some words.

Chinese gloss	English gloss	Lewu	Page
吃饭	eat rice	zuǒ zuó liē	144
猪心肺	pig heart and lungs	cī ber	144
这里来	come (from) here	wū lài lai	144
什么东西	What thing?	māi yuō	144
蚕豆	broad bean (Vicia faba)	nuó suō	144
豌豆	pea (Pisum sativum)	nuó sǎi	144
回来，回来你回来	come back, come back, you come back	gǔ lāi gǔ lai gǔ lāi	144
白酒	liquor	zhī zhí	144
清酒	rice wine	a zhì	144
筷子	chopsticks	a zhu	144
刀	knife	biě tuo	145
斧子	axe	shì cuo	145
碗	bowl	lin hua	145
勺	spoon	yì geu	145
打	to hit	ch wō	145
没有了	There is no more.	mā ia lāi	145

== Sources ==
- Hsiu, Andrew. 2017. The Lawu languages: footprints along the Red River valley corridor.
