= Kucong language =

Loloish language of China and Vietnam

Kucong
- Native to: China, Vietnam
- Region: Yunnan
- Native speakers: 50,000 (2007)
- Language family: Sino-Tibetan: (Tibeto-Burman); Lolo–Burmese; Loloish; Lahoish; Lahu; Kucong

Language codes
- ISO 639-3: lkc
- Glottolog: kuco1235
- ELP: Kucong

Kucong (Khucong, Cosung), or Lahlu, is a Loloish language of Yunnan, China and Vietnam, primarily spoken by the Kucong people. In Vietnam, the speakers' autonym is kʰu33 tsʰɔ33, and they are also known as the La Hủ Na 'Black Lahu'. The language is very closely related to Lahu.

== Distribution ==
Kucong is spoken in China and Vietnam.

=== Vietnam ===
Kucong, or Black Lahu, is spoken in the following villages of Ca Lăng Commune, Mường Tè District, Lai Châu Province, Vietnam.

- Nậm Phìn
- Nậm Khao
- Nậm Cấu
- Phìn Hồ
- Nậm Xả

The Kucong, or Black Lahu, live adjacently to the La Hủ Sủ (Yellow Lahu) and La Hủ Phung (White Lahu). The Yellow Lahu are distributed in the following locations.

- Pa Vệ Sủ Commune
- Pa Ủ Commune
- Ca Lăng Commune (in Là Pé, Nhu Tè, and Hóm Bô)

The White Lahu live in the following locations, often together with the Yellow Lahu.

- Pa Ủ Commune (in Xà Hồ, Ử Ma, Pha Bu, Pa Ử, and Khồ Ma)
- Ca Lăng Commune (in Hà Xe)

The Kucong and related Lahu groups had originally come from the Jinping County area of southern Yunnan, China.

=== China ===
Sun Hongkai (1992) reports 30,000 Kucong speakers in Yunnan, China. Chang (2011:5) recognizes three branches of Kucong.

- Black Kucong 黑苦聪 (Lahu Na; autonym Guocuo 锅搓 or Guochou 郭抽) is spoken in Zhenyuan, Mojiang, Jiangcheng, Yuanjiang, and Mengla counties, and in Mường Tè District, Vietnam. Chang Suanzhi (2011) covers the Black Kucong dialect of Shaohuiqing[zhai], Dangduo Village, Yangjie Township, Yuanjiang County (元江县羊街乡党舵村烧灰箐寨). Their autonym in Yuanjiang County is kɔ³¹tsʰɔ³³.
- Yellow Kucong 黄苦聪 (Lahu Shi) is spoken in Jinping County.
- White Kucong 白苦聪 (Lahu Pu) is spoken in two villages of Zhemi Township (者米乡), Jinping County.

Li & Zhang (2003) report that there are about 30,000 Kucong people in Yunnan. Zhenyuan County has more than 13,000 Kucong people, western Jinping County has more than 6,000 Kucong people, and Xinping County has more than 4,000 Kucong people. Li & Zhang (2003) cover the Kucong dialect of Kudumu Village (库独木村), Pingzhang Township (平掌乡), Xinping County (新平县). In Xinping County, their autonym is kɔ³³tsʰɔ⁵³, which means 'mountain people.'

In Yuanjiang County, Kucong (960 people total) is spoken in the following villages.

- Xingfu Village (幸福村), Dong'e Town (东峨镇, 536 people)
- Damansha Village (大漫沙村), Mili Township (咪哩乡, 129 people)
- Shaohuiqingzhai (烧灰箐寨), Yangjie Township (羊街乡, 186 people)

== Bibliography ==
- Chang, Junzhi 常俊之 (2011). Yuánjiāng Kǔcōnghuà cānkǎo yǔfǎ 元江苦聪话参考语法 [A Reference Grammar of Yuanjiang Kucong] (in Chinese). Beijing: Zhongguo shehui kexue chubanshe.
- Edmondson, Jerold A. (2002). The Central and Southern Loloish Languages of Vietnam. Proceedings of the Twenty-Eighth Annual Meeting of the Berkeley Linguistics Society: Special Session on Tibeto-Burman and Southeast Asian Linguistics. pp. 1–13. doi:10.3765/bls.v28i2.1042.
- Liú, Jìnróng [刘劲荣] (2024). Yúnnán Xīnpíng Kǔcōnghuà [云南新平苦聪话]. Beijing: Commercial Press [商务印书馆].
