= Kucong =

Ethnic group in Yunnan, China

The Kucong (simplified Chinese: 苦聪人; traditional Chinese: 苦聰人; pinyin: Kǔcōngrén) are an ethnic group in China. They are considered one of the poorest minorities in the country. There are around 80,000 Kucong people, living primarily in the Mojiang, Xinping, and Mengla counties of China's Yunnan Province. Some live in Thailand, Myanmar, Vietnam, Laos, and the United States, where at least 600 are living as migrants.

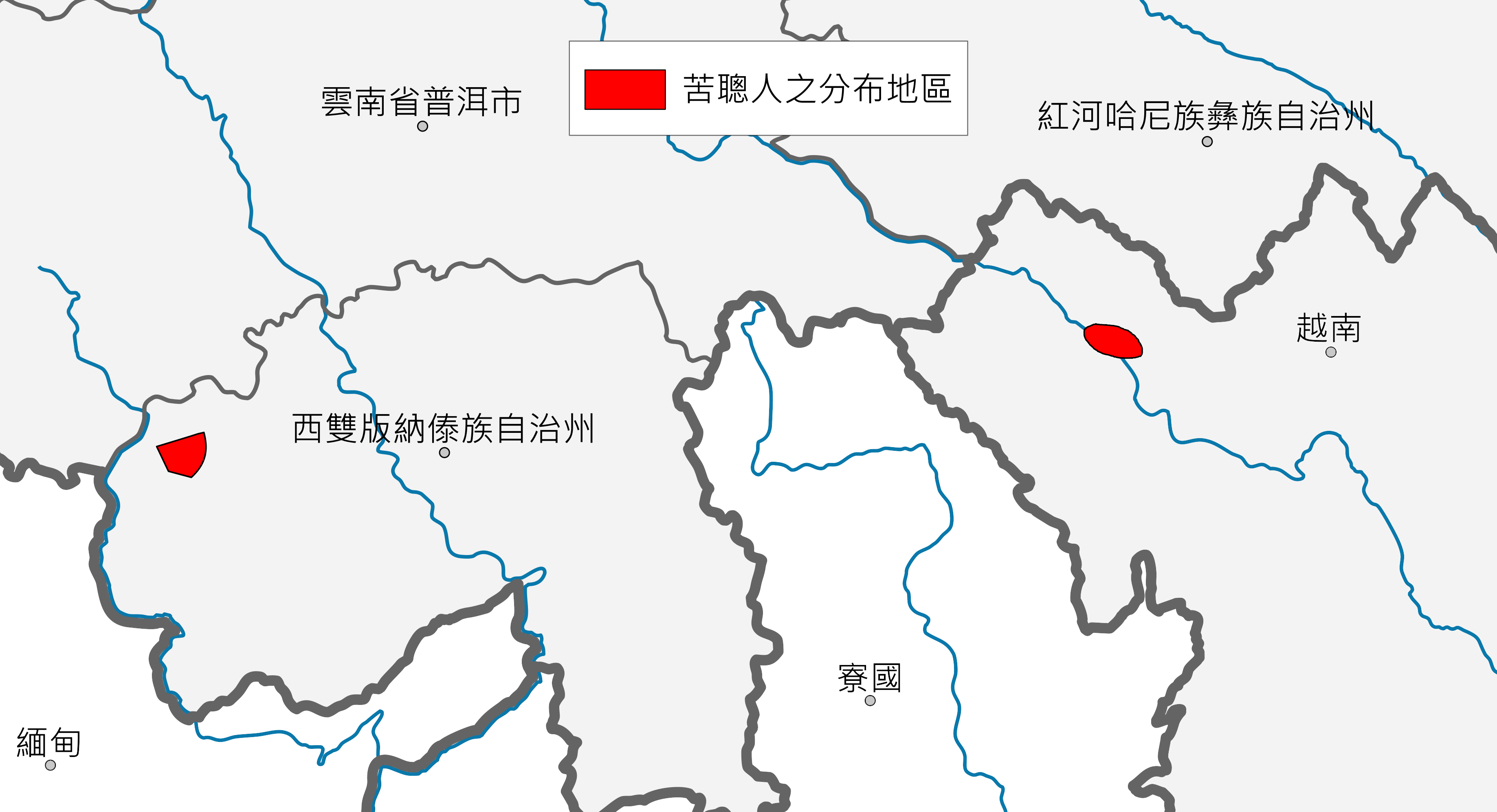
The distribution of Kucong people.

== In China ==
=== Status ===
The Kucong are not recognized by the Chinese government as an official minority nationality. The group has previously applied for a separate minority status, but it was rejected in 1985. The Kucong currently fall under the category of unclassified minorities in China, although they may also be officially included as part of Lahu since 1987.

=== Living conditions ===
The Kucong are co The people are considered invisible people due to the fact that they intentionally have little contact with other ethnic groups, even seldom allowing outsiders to see them physically when selling wares. Their houses are small and narrow, consisting of a single room without divisions or windows and a central fire. Families sleep around the fire together, along with their livestock. The Kucong currently keep a semi-nomadic lifestyle and subsist off of hunting, gathering, government subsidies, and small amounts of commerce with other ethnic groups. Kucong children often do not attend school due to lack of proficiency in Mandarin.

=== Wang Zhengyun ===
1989 Tiananmen Square protests leader Wang Zhengyun was an ethnic Kucong and at the time a student of the Central University for Nationalities. At the time, he was the only member of the Kucong ethnicity to be studying at a university. Zhengyun was arrested in July 1989 and released two years later to return to his village in the Yunnan countryside.

== In Laos ==
The Kucong are also found in Laos and are considered to be one the nation's more primitive groups. More than 3,000 Kucong inhabit at least 16 villages of northern part of the country. A subgroup of the Kucong in Laos are called Lahu Aga ('Bent Gourd Lahu') by other people because they traditionally wore a curved gourd around their necks. These are the reasons why the Kucong are often identified by some sources as part of Lahu group. There are sources, however, that cite distinctions between the two minorities. These point to key differences such as in the case of their languages. Although closely related, Kucong and Lahu are far from mutually intelligible.

== See also ==
- Kucong language
