= Mường Tè district =

Coordinates: 22.333°N 103.583°E

Mường Tè District Huyện Mường Tè
- District
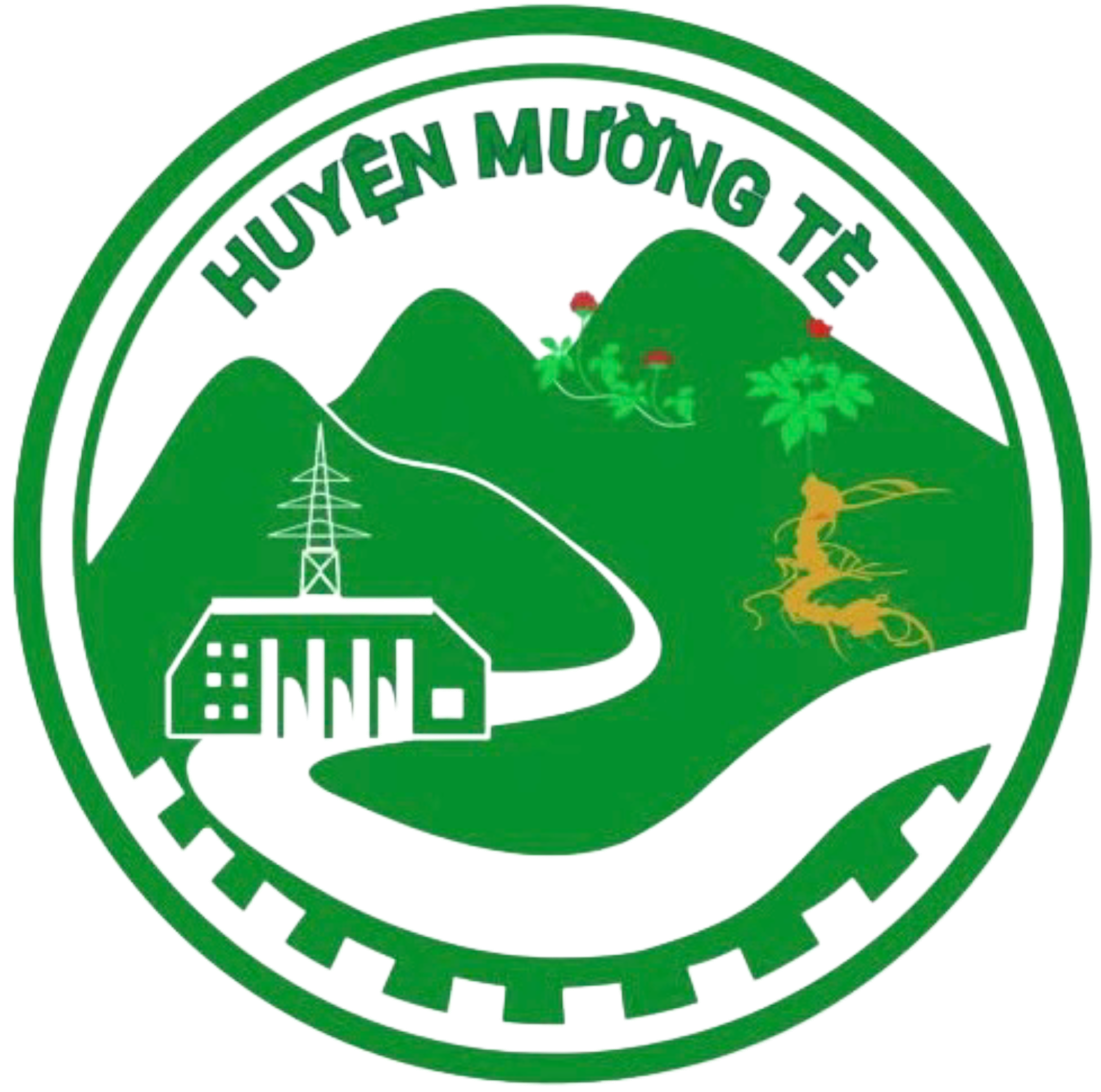
- Seal
- Interactive map of Mường Tè District
- Country: Vietnam
- Region: Northwest
- Province: Lai Châu
- Capital: Mường Tè

Area
  - Total: 1,034.50 sq mi (2,679.34 km^{2})

Population (2019 census)
  - Total: 46,143
  - Density: 44.604/sq mi (17.222/km^{2})
- Time zone: UTC+7 (Indochina Time)

Mường Tè is a former rural district of Lai Châu province in the Northwest region of Vietnam. As of 2019, the district had a population of 46,143. The district covers an area of 2,679.34 km^{2}. The district capital lies at Mường Tè. Mường is equivalent to Mueang.

In 2012, the eastern portion of the district was carved out to form Nậm Nhùn district.

The district is subdivided to 14 commune-level subdivisions, including Mường Tè township and the rural communes of: Bum Nưa, Bum Tở, Kan Hồ, Ka Lăng, Mù Cả, Mường Tè, Nậm Khao, Pa Ủ, Pa Vệ Sử, Tá Bạ, Tà Tổng, Thu Lũm and Vàng San.

== Geography ==
The district lies in the western part of Lai Châu Province, to the west of Nậm Nhùn district. There are various ethnic minorities of people such as the Tai, Hmong, Lahu, Hani, Si La and Phunoi.

== Climate ==
Climate data for Mường Tè, elevation 310 m (1,020 ft)
Month	Jan	Feb	Mar	Apr	May	Jun	Jul	Aug	Sep	Oct	Nov	Dec	Year
Record high °C (°F)	32.6 (90.7)	35.5 (95.9)	38.2 (100.8)	41.7 (107.1)	41.3 (106.3)	38.8 (101.8)	38.0 (100.4)	38.1 (100.6)	37.4 (99.3)	38.0 (100.4)	35.5 (95.9)	32.1 (89.8)	41.7 (107.1)
Mean daily maximum °C (°F)	24.5 (76.1)	27.2 (81.0)	30.3 (86.5)	32.8 (91.0)	33.1 (91.6)	32.1 (89.8)	31.6 (88.9)	32.2 (90.0)	32.2 (90.0)	30.4 (86.7)	27.4 (81.3)	24.5 (76.1)	29.9 (85.8)
Daily mean °C (°F)	16.9 (62.4)	18.4 (65.1)	21.1 (70.0)	24.1 (75.4)	25.9 (78.6)	26.4 (79.5)	26.2 (79.2)	26.3 (79.3)	25.6 (78.1)	23.7 (74.7)	20.3 (68.5)	17.3 (63.1)	22.7 (72.9)
Mean daily minimum °C (°F)	13.4 (56.1)	14.0 (57.2)	16.2 (61.2)	19.4 (66.9)	22.0 (71.6)	23.6 (74.5)	23.6 (74.5)	23.3 (73.9)	22.4 (72.3)	20.5 (68.9)	17.2 (63.0)	14.1 (57.4)	19.2 (66.6)
Record low °C (°F)	0.9 (33.6)	7.7 (45.9)	8.0 (46.4)	12.2 (54.0)	15.8 (60.4)	16.8 (62.2)	20.6 (69.1)	19.3 (66.7)	16.0 (60.8)	10.3 (50.5)	8.2 (46.8)	0.8 (33.4)	0.8 (33.4)
Average rainfall mm (inches)	29.2 (1.15)	27.8 (1.09)	50.1 (1.97)	127.6 (5.02)	264.1 (10.40)	462.2 (18.20)	611.5 (24.07)	440.9 (17.36)	195.0 (7.68)	106.0 (4.17)	65.9 (2.59)	30.4 (1.20)	2,412.9 (95.00)
Average rainy days	5.0	5.1	6.7	12.8	19.2	24.7	26.0	23.0	14.6	10.8	7.4	4.9	160.1
Average relative humidity (%)	84.3	80.9	79.1	79.1	82.2	86.8	87.9	86.6	85.6	85.6	86.1	85.7	84.2
Mean monthly sunshine hours	142.1	153.9	174.4	190.9	184.8	121.5	122.2	149.8	159.3	149.2	137.7	133.8	1,814.8
Source: Vietnam Institute for Building Science and Technology
