= Black Stone Minerals =

American oil and gas company

Black Stone Minerals, L.P.
- Company type: Public
- Traded as: Nasdaq: BSM
- Industry: Oil; Natural gas
- Founded: 1876; 150 years ago
- Headquarters: 1001 Fannin Street, Houston, Texas, US
- Key people: Thomas L. Carter, Jr.(president, chairman, & CEO)
- Revenue: ▼US$ 260.83 million (2016)
- Operating income: ▲US$ 27.50 million (2016)
- Net income: ▲US$ 20.19 million (2016)
- Total assets: ▲US$ 1.13 billion (2016)
- Total equity: ▼US$ 671.65 million (2016)
- Number of employees: 108 (2016)
- Website: blackstoneminerals.com

Black Stone Minerals, L.P., or Black Stone Minerals, is a Houston, Texas-based oil and natural gas corporation.

== History ==
The company was founded as W.T. Carter & Bro., a lumber company, in 1876.

The company discovered the Double A Wells Field in East Texas in 1985. It began drilling oil in the late 1980s. By 1992, it acquired the land rights of the Kirby Lumber Company, founded by John Henry Kirby. Four years later, in 1996, it divested from its holdings in the Double A Wells Field.

According to Bloomberg Business, by 2014 it owned millions of acres of interests in the "Bakken/Three Forks plays, Eagle Ford Shale, Wolfcamp play, Haynesville/Bossier plays, Granite Wash play, and Fayetteville Shale, as well as in the Tuscaloosa Marine Shale and the Canyon Lime play located in 41 states and in 62 onshore basins in the continental United States."

It has been traded on the NASDAQ since 2015.
