= Lahu people =

Ethnic group of China and mainland Southeast Asia

Lahu

Total population
- c. 1 million Map of the Lahu Diaspora in the world.

Regions with significant populations
- China: 499,167
- Significant Lahu diaspora in
- Myanmar: 269,000
- Thailand: 116,126
- Laos: 21,680
- Vietnam: 12,113
- United States: 2,339

Languages
- Lahu, Kucong

Religion
- Historically, traditional Lahu animist beliefs; today, Christianity and Buddhism, and traditional ethnic religion, often incorporating ancestral beliefs and practices.

Related ethnic groups
- Akha people, Hani people, Jino people, Lisu people, Phunoi people, Yi people

The Lahu people (Lahu: Ladhulsi / Kawzhawd; Burmese: လားဟူလူမျိုး; Chinese: 拉祜族 Lāhùzú; Lao: Lahou; Vietnamese: La Hủ) are an ethnic group indigenous to Yunnan province, southwestern China, with historical communities extending throughout mainland Southeast Asia.

== Etymology ==
The Chinese name "Lahu" is a phono-semantic matching of the Lahu endonym, and literally means "to drag favour from heaven" (拉, lā, "to drag"; 祜, hù, "blessing, favour"). It replaced the older and more-offensive "Luohei" (猓黑) as the official Chinese name for the Lahu people.

== Distribution ==
The Lahu are one of the 56 ethnic groups officially recognized by the People's Republic of China, where about 720,000 live in Yunnan province, mostly in Lancang Lahu Autonomous County. In Thailand, the Lahu are one of the six main groups categorized as hill tribes. The Tai often refer to them by the exonym Musoe (also spelled Muser; Thai: มูเซอ), meaning 'hunter'. They are one of 54 ethnic groups in Vietnam, and mostly live in three communes of Mường Tè, Lai Châu Province.

A few Lahu, along with many Hmong and Mien and some Lao, were recruited by the United States Central Intelligence Agency to help fight against the communist Pathet Lao, known as the secret war, during the Laotian Civil War. In fear of retribution when the Pathet Lao took over the Laotian government in 1975, those who had helped the United States fled to neighboring Thailand seeking political asylum.

A couple thousand Lahu have resettled in the United States as refugees, in the states of California, Minnesota, North Carolina, Texas, and Utah.

== Subgroups ==
The Lahu divide themselves into a number of subgroups, such as the Lahu Na (Black Lahu), Lahu Nyi (Red Lahu), Lahu Hpu (White Lahu), Lahu Shi (Yellow Lahu) and the Lahu Shehleh. Where a subgroup name refers to a color, it refers to the traditional color of their dress. These groups do not function as tribes or clans - there are no kin groups above that of the family. Lahu trace descent bilaterally, and typically practice matrilocal residence.

Bradley (1979) lists the following Lahu ethnic subgroups.

Black Lahu

- Lahu Na
  - Meuneu (Shan, 'north country')
  - Meun Pulon
  - Shehvi (Hsenwi)
  - Bawfa (Shanised)
  - Hkahka: (known only to Bradley's Akha informants)
  - Panai (known only to Bradley's Akha informants)
- Divergent Lahu Na dialects
  - Kaishin: (Chinese 'exchange hearts')
  - Hpu: ('white')
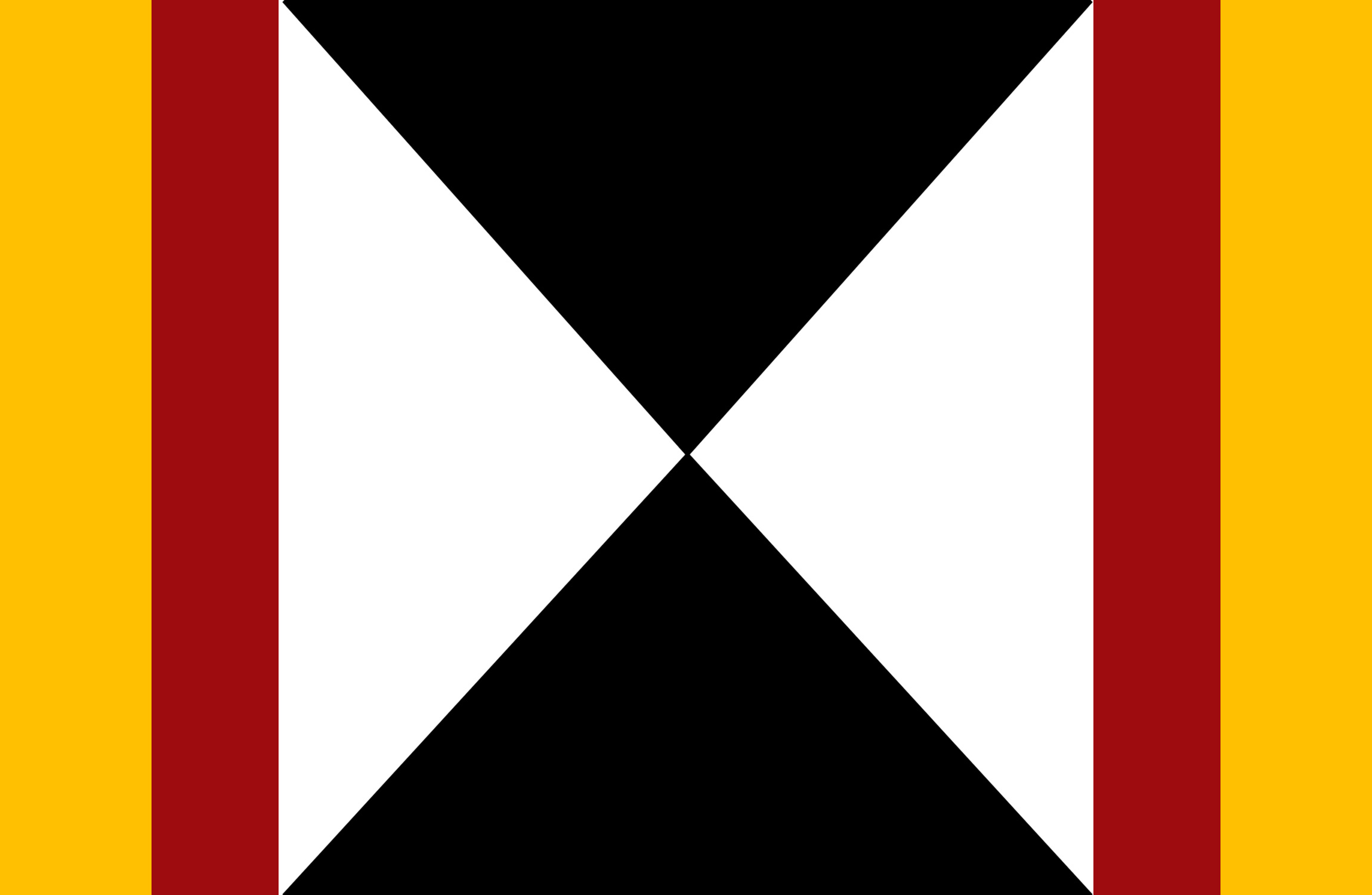
    Flag of the Lahu people
    - Hu:paw
    - Kulao
    - Namhpehn (hpeh)
    - Lalaw (na)
  - Laba
  - Huli
- Lahu Nyi ('red')
  - Nyi
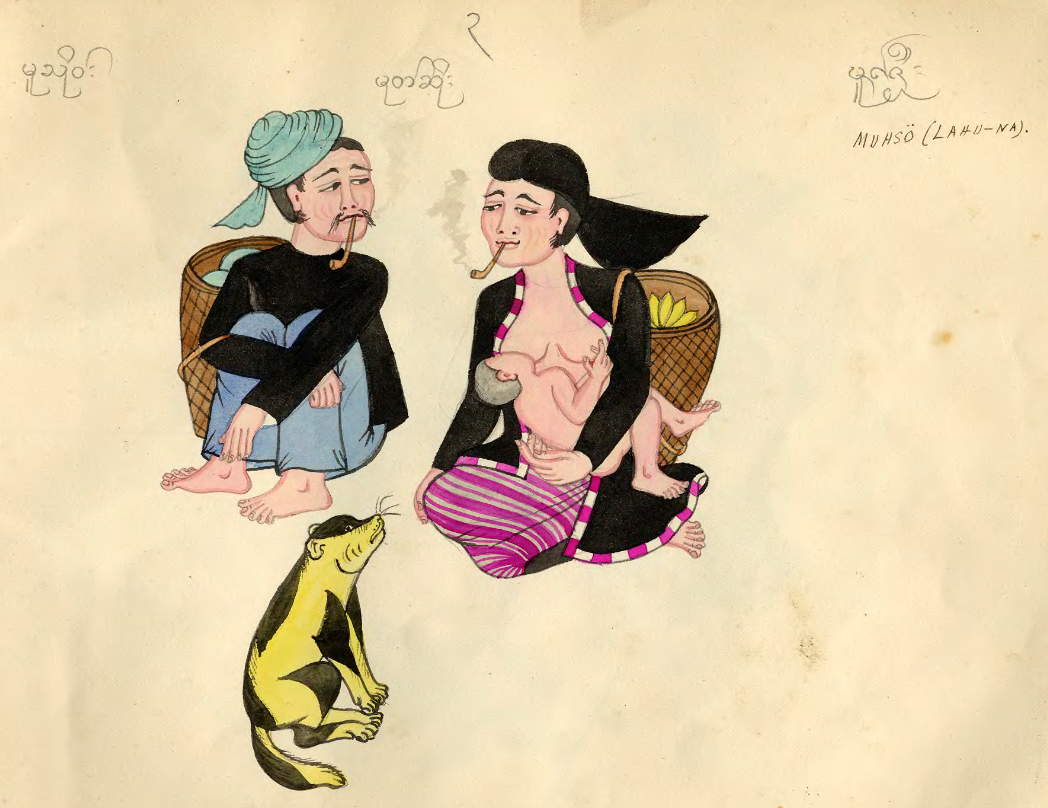
  - A Burmese depiction of the Lahu Na (Black Lahu)
    Venya ('go to town')
  - Kulao: (not the same as Hpu: type Lahu Kulao)
- Shehleh (Red Lahu name)
  - Laho Na ('black') / Shehleh
  - Laho Namoe
  - Laho A:leh

Yellow Lahu

- 'Like Black Lahu'
  - A:ga / A:do'aga (Black Lahu name)
  - A:hpube:le: (Yellow Lahu 'bent gourd'; own name)
  - Shi: Bankeo:
- Laho Shi
  - Banlan (black name)
  - Menhke (yellow name)

Divergent

- Lahu Meh
- Lahu Lawmeh
- Lahu Velon ('big town')

Unclassified (Note: Not known to Bradley's informants)

- Kawsung (Kucong?)
- Pawla
- Khapaw
- Cili
- Senling
- Nambawpe
- Si Pyeng ('yellow-Pyeng')
- Si Pü ('yellow - white')
- Hai (Chinese 'black' ?)

Non-Lahu (some have "become" Lahu)

- Micha (Lisoid group)
- Bana (Akoid group)

== Language ==
The Lahu language is part of the Loloish branch of the Lolo–Burmese subgroup of the Tibeto-Burman family (itself a member of the Sino-Tibetan language family). Like most of its relatives, it is a strongly isolating language with subject–object–verb word order, and a set of numeral classifiers. There are seven tones, and consonants cannot close syllables. The language spoken by the Lahu Shi is notably divergent from that spoken by the other groups. In Thailand, Lahu Na often serves as a lingua franca among the various hill tribes. Written Lahu uses the Latin alphabet. Among Christian villages, the language has been enriched by loanwords from English, Latin and Greek via Bible translation, plus neologisms in the areas of hygiene, music and education.

== Religion ==
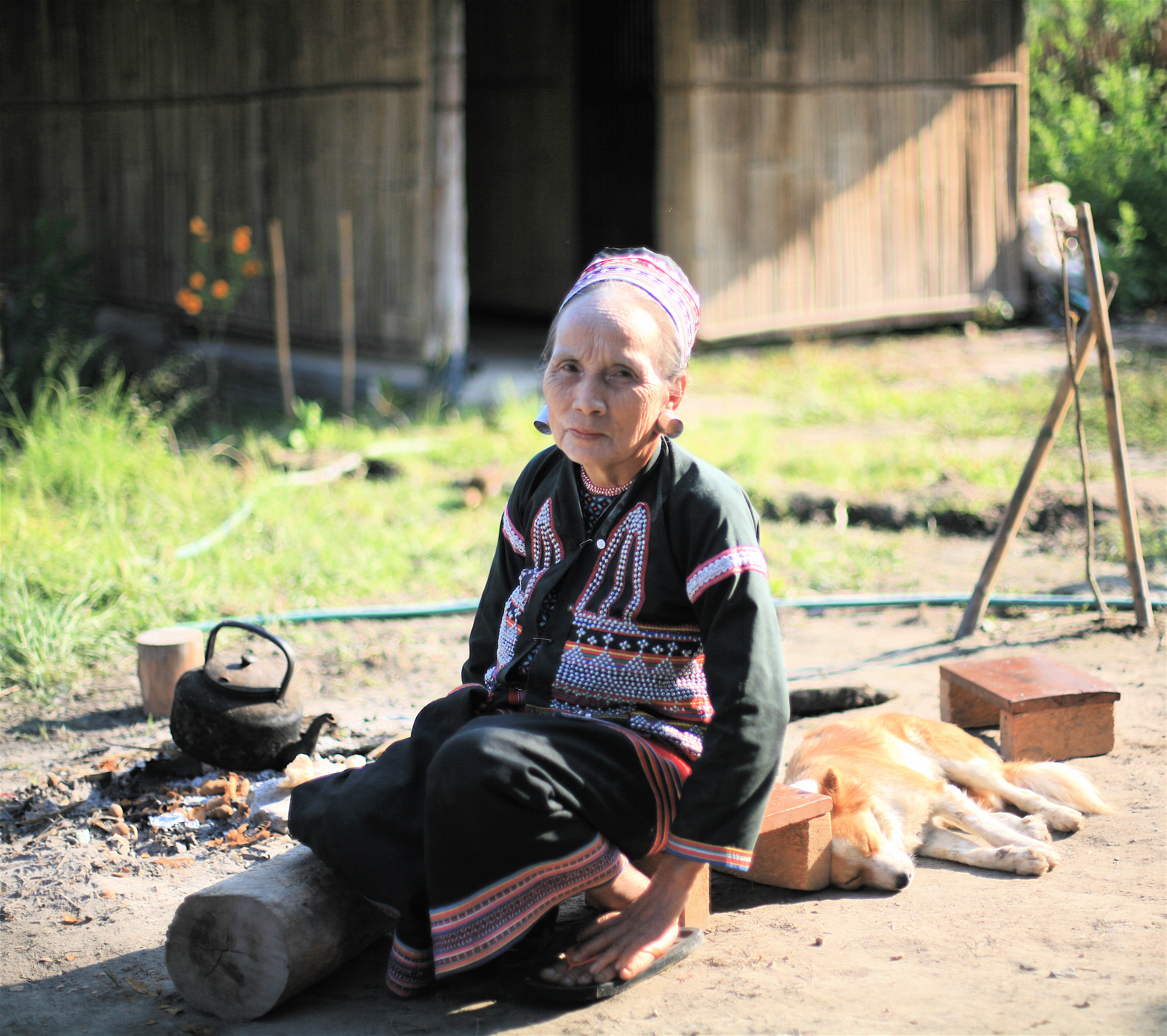
An elderly Lahu woman

The traditional Lahu religion is polytheistic. Buddhism was introduced in the late 17th century and became widespread. Many Lahu people in China are Buddhists. Christianity became established in Burma in the 19th century and has been spreading since.

The Lahu of Northeastern Thailand had encounters with Theravada Buddhist forest monks (tudong monks) around the years 1930–1940. The leader of such a group of monks, Mun Bhuridatta, spent some time in Lahu territory. These Lahu asked him for a "gatha that would protect them from ghosts and demons."

== Names ==
Lahu people used to have just a given name, until the Chinese Government gave them surnames. About 90% of the Lahu people are either named Lee or Zhang, two of the most common Chinese surnames. Lahu given names are made of two syllables: one that shows the gender and one that gives information on the day of birth, based on the zodiac. For example, a person born on the Ox day will be named “Zanu” if he is a boy and “Nanu” if she is a girl.
