= Lai Châu province =

Province of Vietnam

Lai Châu
- Province
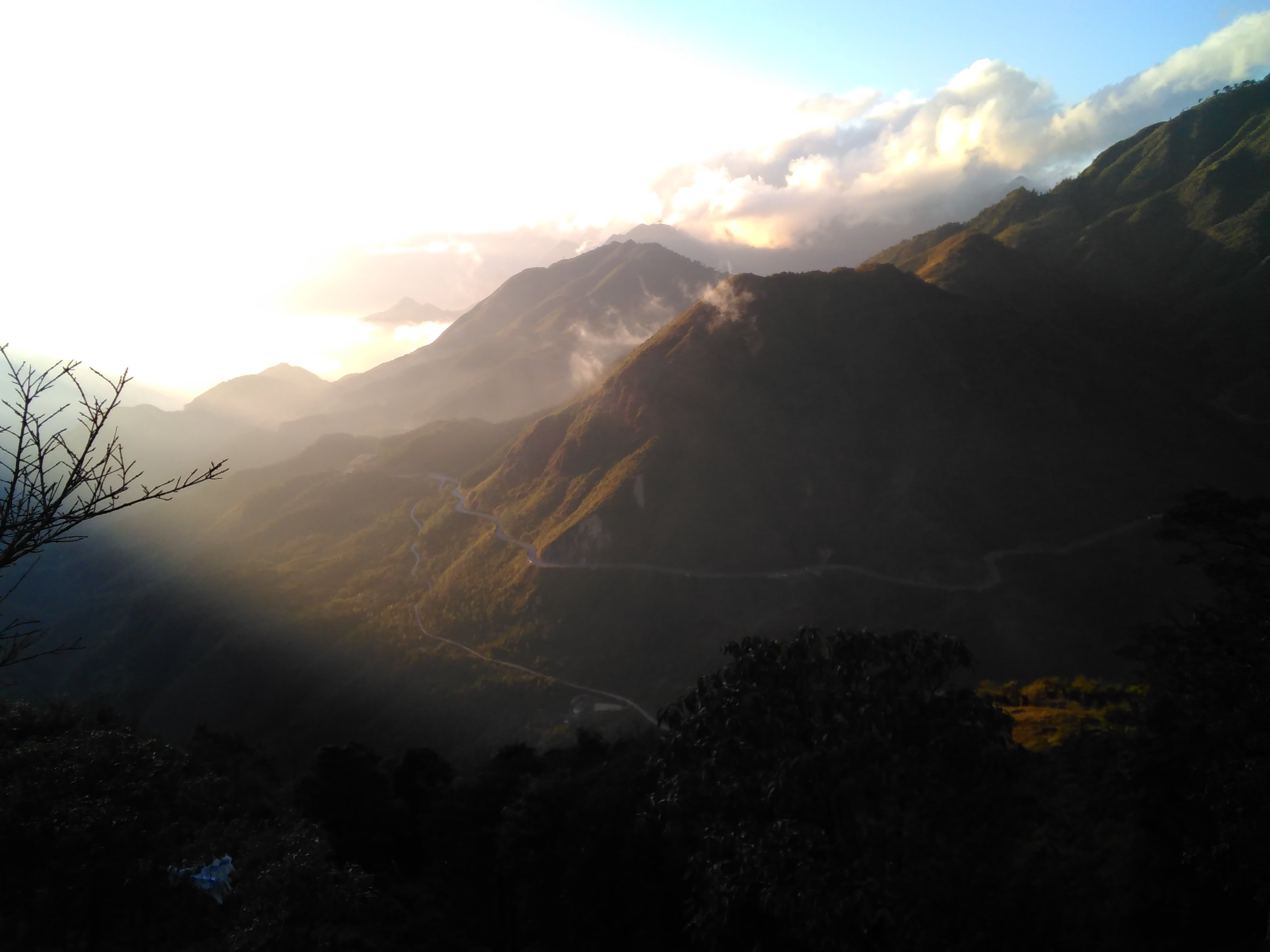
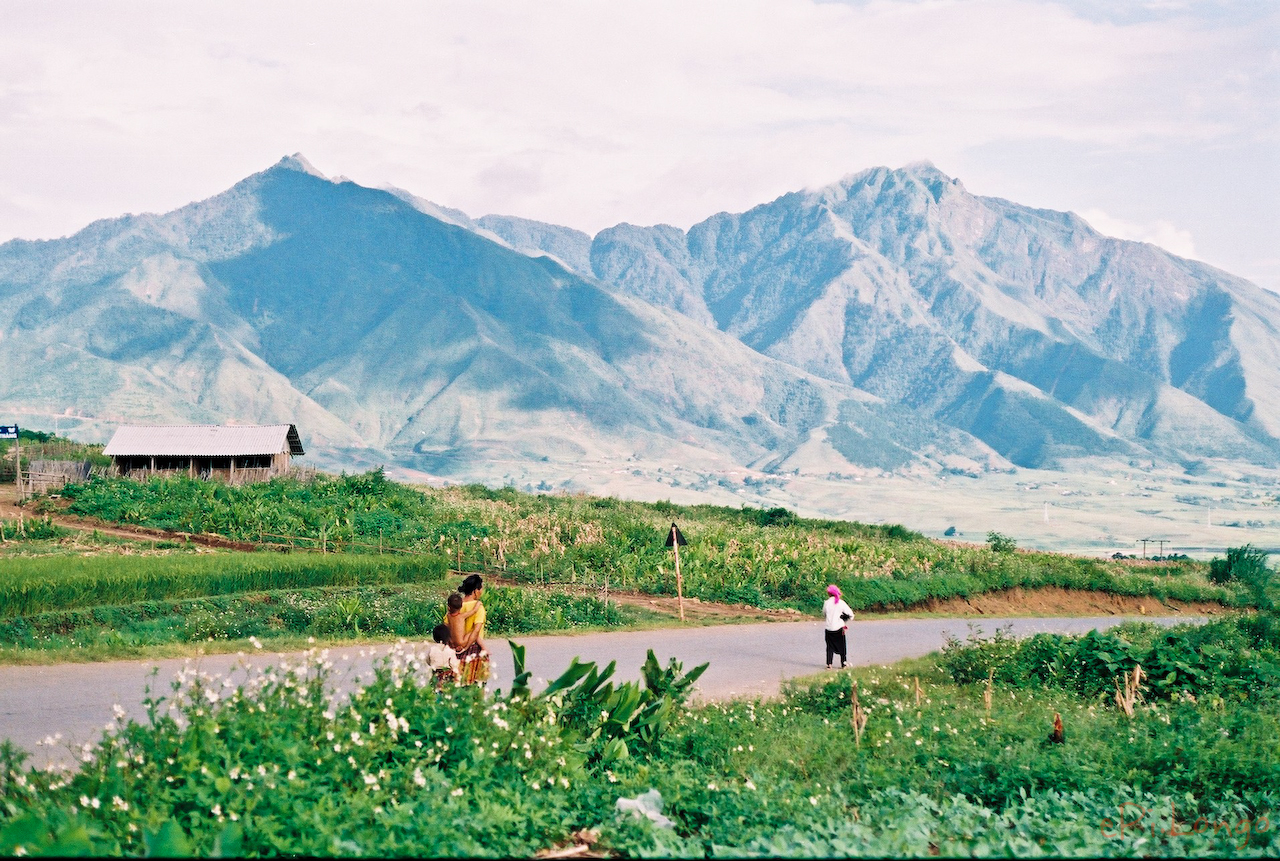
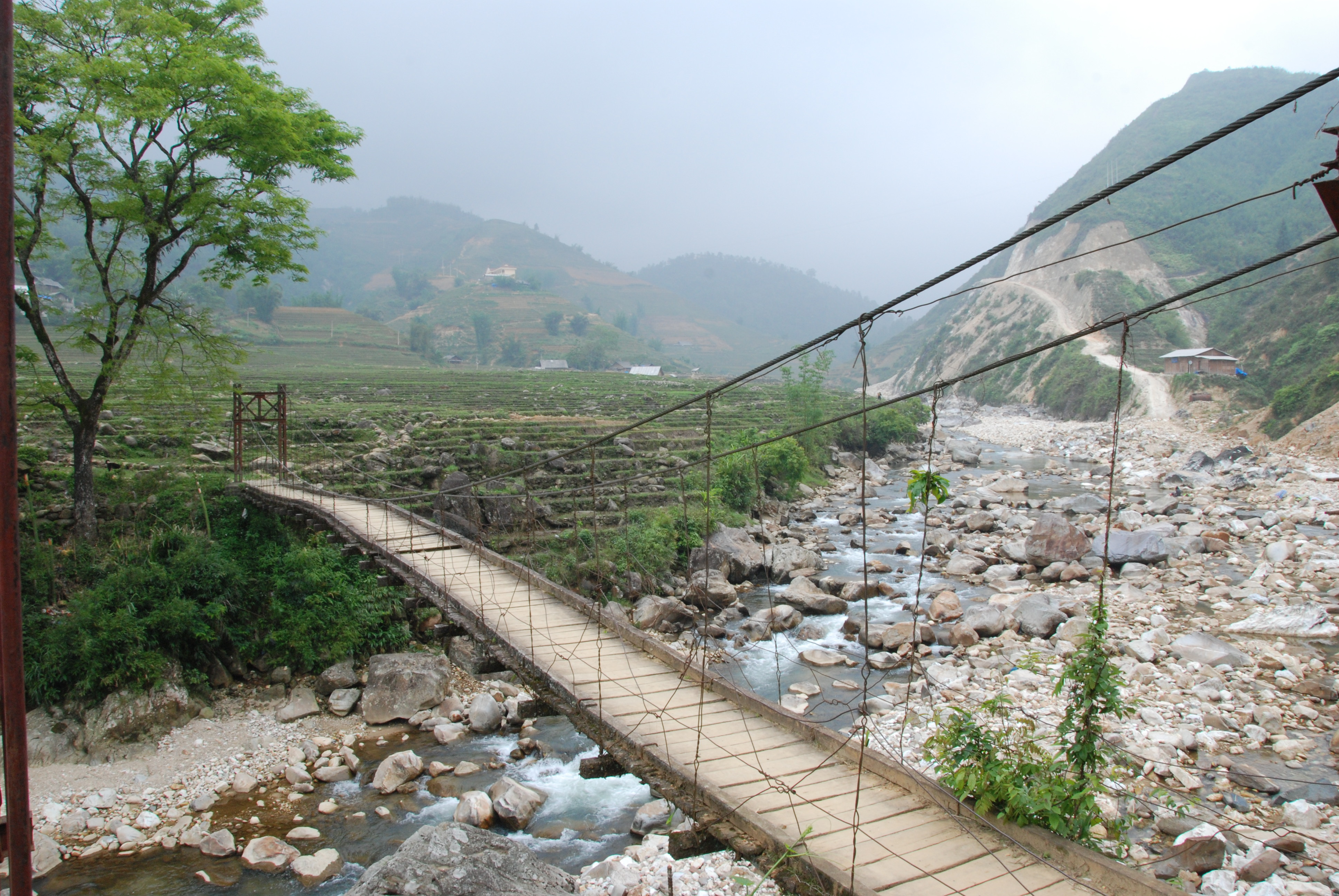
- Clockwise from top left: Hoàng Liên National Park; Than Uyen Mountains; Bridge across a stream

- Seal

- Interactive map of Lai Châu
- Coordinates: 22°0′N 103°0′E
- Country: Vietnam
- Region: Northwest

Government
  - Type: Province
  - Body: Lai Châu Provincial People's Council
  - Chairman of People's Council: Giàng Páo Mỷ
  - Chairman of People's Committee: Lê Văn Lương

Area
  - Total: 9,068.73 km^{2} (3,501.46 sq mi)

Population (2025)
  - Total: 512,601
  - Density: 56.5240/km^{2} (146.397/sq mi)

Ethnic groups
  - Thái: 31.05%
  - Mông: 23.97%
  - Viet: 15.91%
  - Dao: 12.79%
  - Hà Nhì: 3.47%
  - Others: 12.81%

GDP
  - Province: VND 14.998 trillion US$ 0.654 billion
- Time zone: UTC+7 (ICT)
- Area codes: 213
- ISO 3166 code: VN-01
- HDI (2020): ▲0.600 (34th)
- Website: laichau.gov.vn

Lai Châu (Vietnamese pronunciation: [lāi cʌ̄w]) is a mountainous province in the Northwest region of Vietnam. Lai Châu was a semi-independent White Tai confederation known as Sip Song Chau Tai, was absorbed by France into French Indochina in the 1880s and became part of Vietnam following Vietnamese independence in 1954. It became part of the Northwest Autonomous Area of the Democratic Republic of Vietnam from 1955 to 1975, when Lai Châu province was formed. Điện Biên province was carved out of Lai Châu in 2004. The province covers an area of about 9,069 km^{2} (3,501 mi^{2}) and as of 2022 it had a population of 482,100 people.

== Demographics ==
As of April 1, 2019, Lai Châu's population was 460,196 people, ranked 62/63 provinces and municipalities nationwide, above Bắc Kạn province. 17,8% of the population lived in urban areas while 82,2% lived in rural areas. Thai people have 131.822 people (34% of the population), Kinh people have 73,233 people (15.9% of the population), the rest are of other ethnic group such as Hmong, Hani, and Dao.

== Economy ==
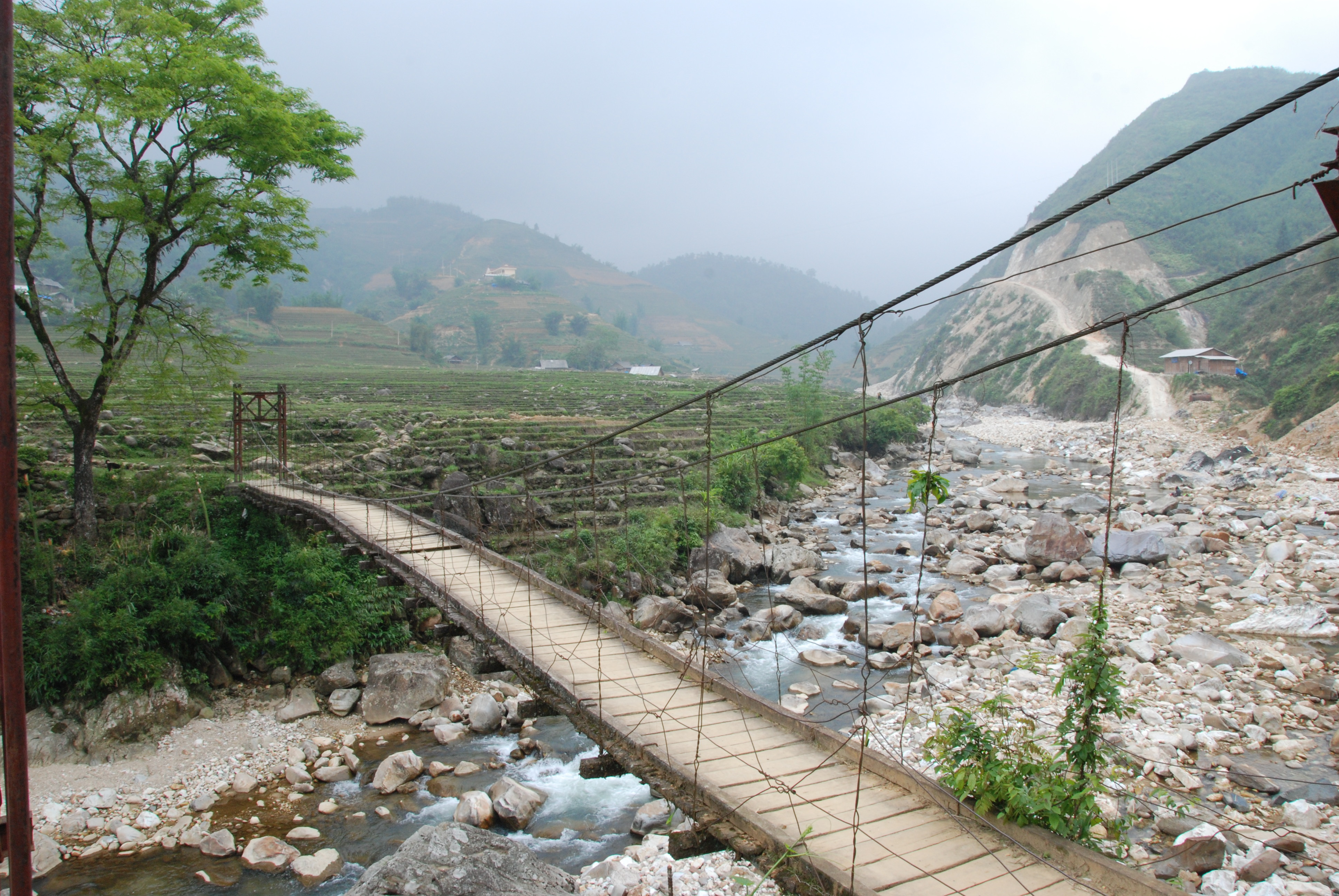
A bridge in Lai Châu province

In 1974, the industrial output of Hanoi was 47 times as high as that of Lai Châu. The more industrialised south was separated to become Điện Biên province. In 2007, Hanoi's industrial output (before its merger with Hà Tây province) was 93 times that of Lai Châu. Industrial output has grown, more than tripling between 2000 and 2007, making it the fastest growing sector in the province compared to an agriculture and forestry sector that has grown by less than 50% and a service sector that has more than doubled in the same time.

Lai Châu's main agricultural products (in 2007) are rice (99,900 t), maize (35,000 t), cassava (48,900 t) and tea (16,532 t). The production of rice and maize has tripled since 2000, while the output of cassava and tea has been increasing by around 40% and 120% respectively. The forestry sector has an output of 176.3 billion đồngs in 2007. It has grown by 1.69% in 2006 and 1.66% in 2007, after declining by almost 19% between 2000 and 2005.

There are plans to exploit rare-earth elements in Lai Châu, such as those in Đông Pao mine. Vietnam's central government signed an agreement in October 2010 to supply Japan with rare-earth elements from Lai Châu province.

Lai Châu's economy grew by 50.75% between 2000 and 2005, 12.3% in 2006 and 14.56% in 2007.

== Infrastructure ==
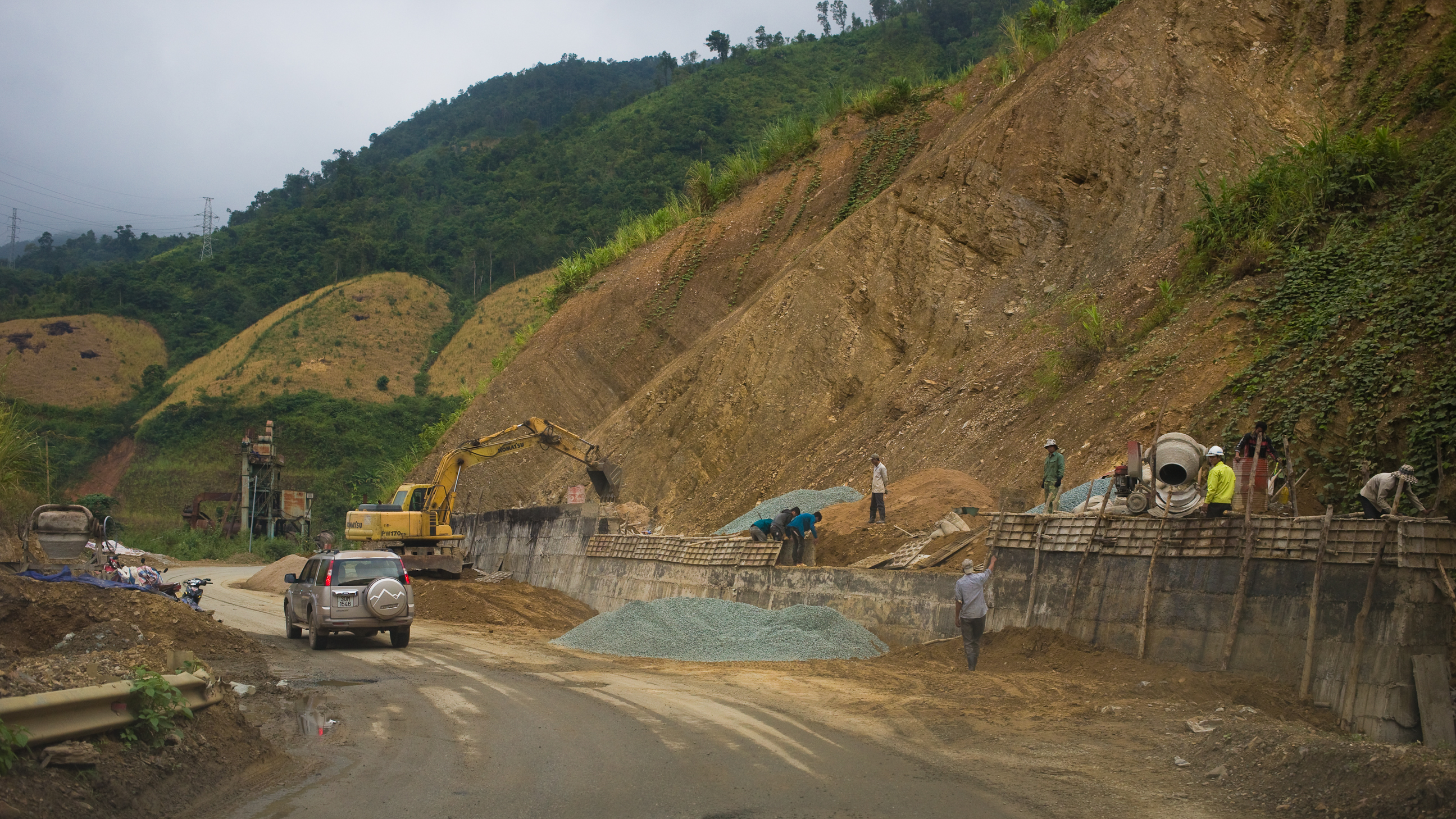
Road construction works in Lai Châu province

=== Transport ===
Freight traffic increased from 1 million ton-km in 2000 to 21.3 million ton-km in 2007, while passenger traffic increased from 4.4 to 16.7 million passenger-km.

19.36% of the roads in the province are paved and 10.53% of respondents to a survey of local businesses think that road quality is good or very good.

=== Telecommunication ===
As of 2007, there 22,100 telephone subscribers in Lai Châu, an increase from the 14,200 in the previous year. 35.59% of the respondents to a survey assessed telecommunications quality as good or very good, the lowest value among all the provinces in Vietnam.
