= Demographics of China =

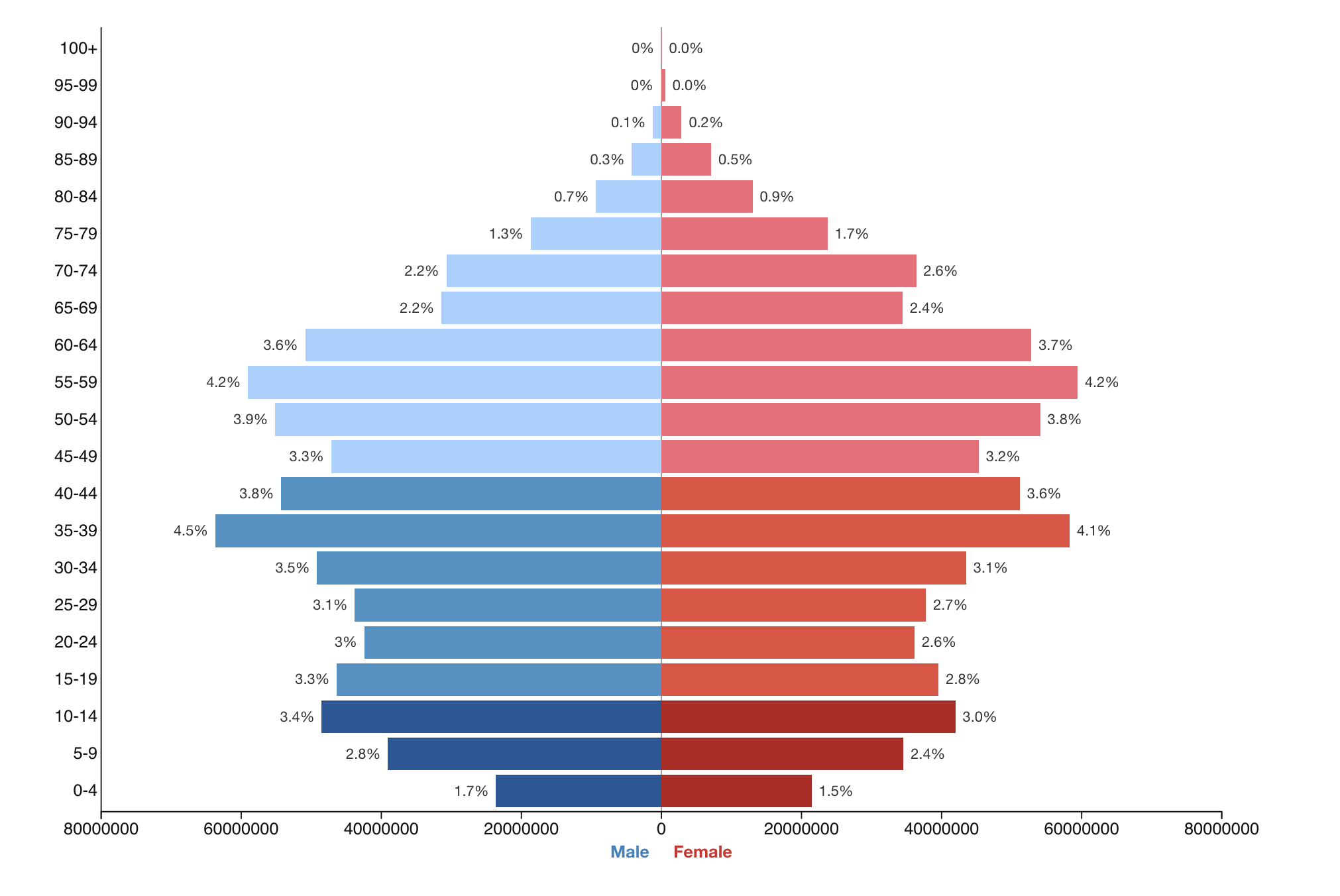
- Population pyramid of China in 2026
- Population: ▼1,404,890,000 (31 December 2025)
- Growth rate: ▼ −0.24% (2025 est.) (159th)
- Birth rate: ▼5.63 births per 1,000 (2025 est.)
- Death rate: ▲8.04 deaths per 1,000 (2025 est.)
- Life expectancy: ▲79 years (2024)
  - male: ▲76.0 years (2022)
  - female: ▲81.3 years (2022)
- Fertility rate: ▼0.93 children per woman (2025 est.)
- Infant mortality: 6.76 deaths per 1000 live births (2022)

Age structure
- 0–14 years: 16.48% (male 124,166,174/female 108,729,429)
- 15–64 years: 69.4% (male 504,637,819/female 476,146,909)
- 65 and over: 14.11% (male 92,426,805/female 107,035,710) (2023 est.)

Sex ratio
- Total: 1.04 male to female (2024 est.)
- At birth: 1.09 male to female (2024 est.)
- Under 15: 1.14 male to female (2024 est.)
- 15–64 years: 1.06 male to female (2024 est.)
- 65 and over: 0.86 male to female (2024 est.)

Nationality
- Major ethnic: ▼ Han Chinese (91.11%)
- Minor ethnic: ▲ Zhuang (1.39%); ▲ Uyghurs (0.84%); ▲ Hui (0.81%); ▲ Miao (0.79%); ▼ Manchus (0.74%); ▲ Yi (0.70%); ▲ Tujia (0.68%); ▲ Tibetans (0.50%); Mongols (0.45%); ▲ Bouyei (0.25%); ▲ Other groups (1.74%)

Language
- Official: Standard Chinese
- Spoken: Various; See Languages of China

The People's Republic of China is the second most-populous country in the world with a population exceeding 1.4 billion, only surpassed by India. China was the world's most populous country until it was surpassed by India in 2023.

In 2025, China's population officially stood at 1.404 billion, which was three million less than the previous year, with the lowest recorded birthrate since at least the proclamation of the People's Republic of China in 1949. China's population has a relatively small youth component, partially a result of the strict enforcement of China's one-child policy that was in effect from 1979 until 2015, which limited urban families to one child and rural families to two. As of 2025, the country's total fertility rate was below 1.0, one of the lowest in the world. Since 2022, deaths have outstripped births in the country.

According to the 2020 census, 91.11% of the population was Han Chinese, and 8.89% were minorities. China's population growth rate is -0.10%. China conducted its sixth national population census in 2010, and its seventh census was completed in late 2020, with data released in May 2021.

== Population ==
=== Historical population ===
Historical population of India and China since 1100 with projection to 2100 (Outdated, early 2022 projections)

During 1960–2015, the population grew to nearly 1.4 billion. Under Mao Zedong, China nearly doubled in population from 540 million in 1949 to 969 million in 1979. This growth slowed because of the one-child policy instituted in 1979. The 2022 data shows a declining population for the first time since 1961.

China's population reached 1 billion in 1982, making it the first country to reach this milestone.

=== Censuses in China ===
The People's Republic of China conducted censuses in 1953, 1964, 1982, 1990, 2000, 2010, and 2020. In 1987, the government announced that the fourth national census would take place in 1990 and that there would be one every ten years thereafter. The 1982 census (which reported a total population of 1,008,180,738) is generally accepted as significantly more reliable, accurate, and thorough than the previous two. Various international organizations eagerly assisted the Chinese in conducting the 1982 census, including the United Nations Fund for Population Activities, which donated US$100.0 million between 1980 and 1989 for a variety of projects, one of which being the 1982 census.

China was the world's most populous nation until being surpassed by India in 2023.

By the seventh census in 2020, the total population had reached to 1,419,933,142, with the mainland having 1,411,778,724, Hong Kong having 7,474,200, and Macau having 683,218. However, this number is disputed by obstetrics researcher Yi Fuxian, who argues that data related to population growth is inflated by local governments to obtain financial subsidies from the central government.

=== Population density and distribution ===
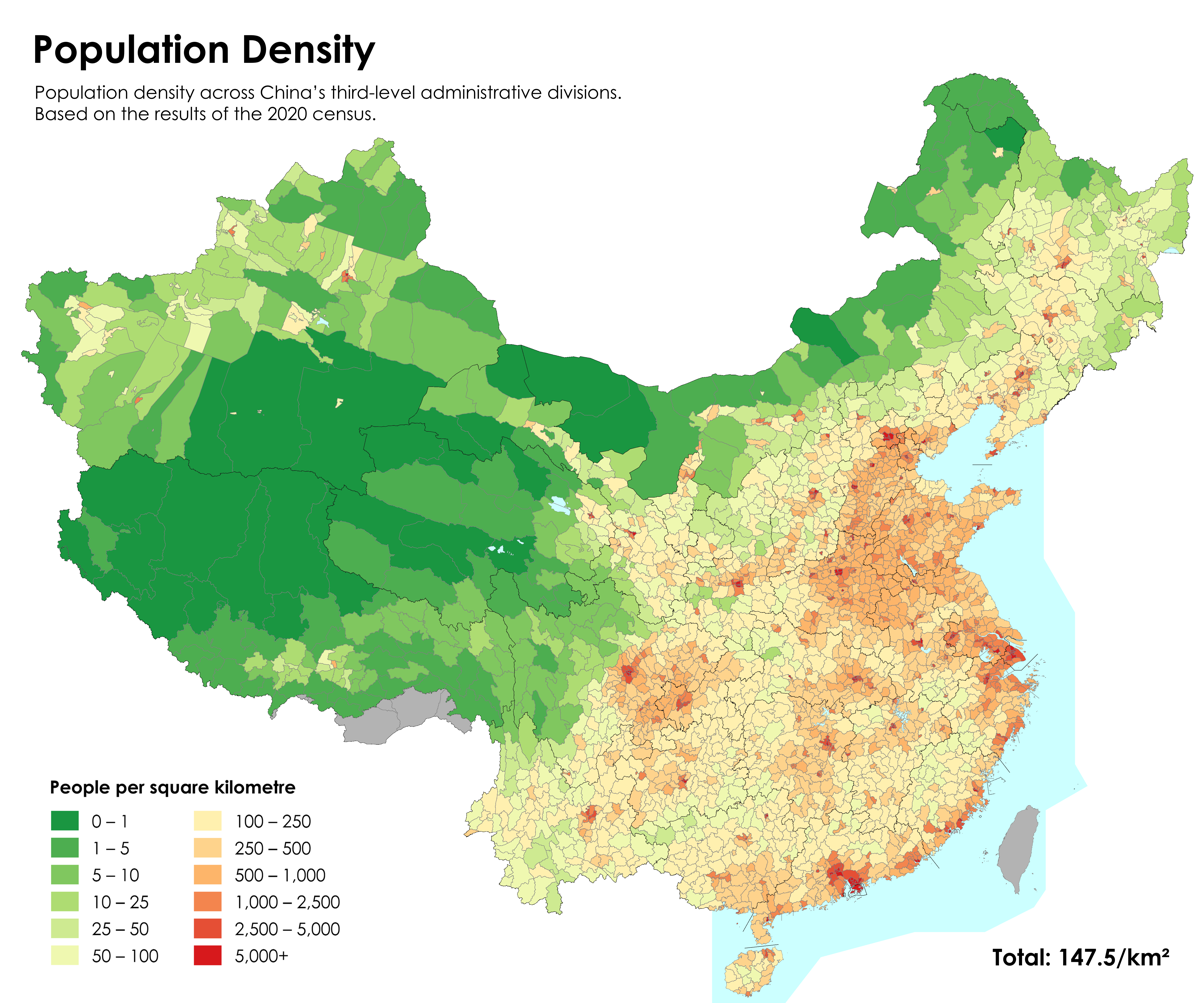
Map of China's population density across third-level administrative divisions. Based on the results of the 2020 census.

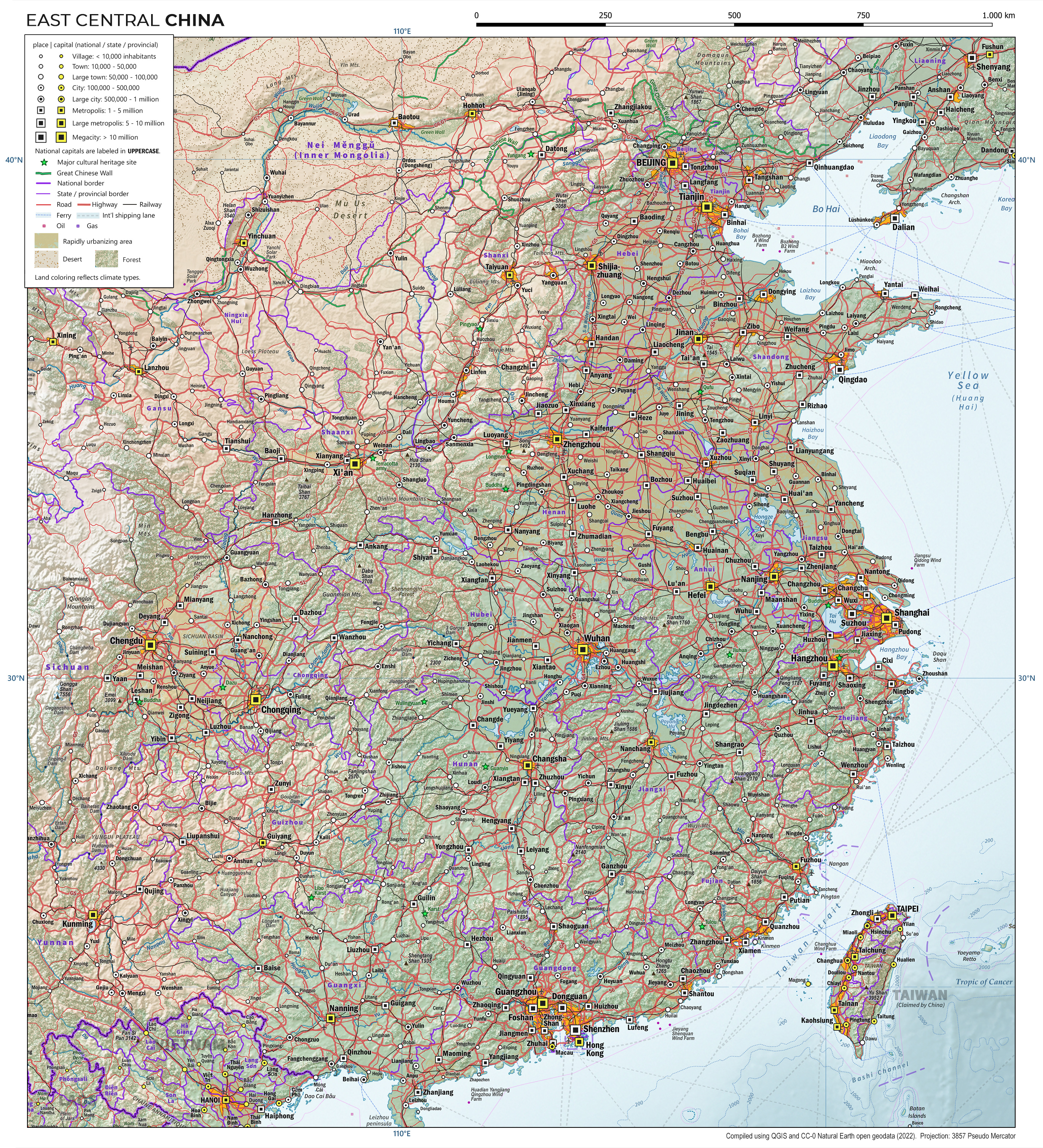
General topographic map of the most populous part of China, as per 2024 (Click to enlarge)

China is the second most populous country in the world and its overall population density is similar to those of countries like Denmark (excluding Greenland) or Ghana. However, the country's population density contains major regional variations. In 2002, about 94% of the population lived east of the Heihe–Tengchong Line; although this eastern area comprises only 43% of China's total land area, its population density, at roughly 280/km^{2}, is comparable to that of Japan.

Broadly speaking, the population concentrates east of the Tibetan Plateau and south of the northern steppe. The most densely populated areas included the Yangtze River Valley (of which the delta region was the most populous), Sichuan Basin, North China Plain, Pearl River Delta, and the industrial area around the city of Shenyang in the northeast.

Population is most sparse in the mountainous, desert, and grassland regions of the northwest and southwest. In the Inner Mongolia Autonomous Region, portions are completely uninhabited, and only a few sections have populations denser than ten people per km^{2}. The Inner Mongolia, Xinjiang, and Tibet autonomous regions and Qinghai and Gansu comprise 55% of the country's land area but in 1985 contained only 5.7% of its population.

	Area (km^{2})	Population	Density
China	9,650,000 (100%)	1,411,778,724 (100%)	134.7/km^{2}
5 provinces	5,246,400 (54.45%)	84,493,388 (5.98%)	15.16/km^{2}
Inner Mongolia	1,183,000 (12.28% )	24,049,155 (1.70%)	20.33/km^{2}
Xinjiang	1,660,000 (17.23%)	25,852,345 (1.83%)	12.62/km^{2}
Tibet	1,228,400 (12.75%)	3,648,100 (0.26%)	2.31/km^{2}
Qinghai	721,000 (7.48%)	5,923,957 (0.42%)	7.65/km^{2}
Gansu	454,000 (4.71%)	25,019,831 (1.77%)	57.65/km^{2}
Other provinces	4,403,605 (45.55%)	1,327,285,336 (94.02%)	277.27/km^{2}
Source: National Bureau of Statistics

Population of China by province 1953–2020
Province or autonomous region	Census 1953		Census 1964		Census 1982		Census 1990		Census 2000		Census 2010		Census 2020	
Province or autonomous region	number	%	number	%	number	%	number	%	number	%	number	%	number	%
Beijing Municipality	3,768,149	1.48	8,568,495	1.23	9,230,687	3.92	11,819,407	0.95	13,820,000	1.09	19,612,368	1.46	21,893,095	1.55
Hebei	35,984,644	6.18	49,687,781	6.58	53,005,876	5.26	61,082,439	5.39	67,440,000	5.33	79,854,202	5.36	74,610,235	5.28
Tianjin Municipality	2,693,831	0.46	49,687,781	6.58	7,764,141	0.77	8,785,402	0.77	10,010,000	0.79	12,938,224	0.97	13,866,009	0.98
Shanxi	14,314,485	2.46	18,015,067	2.59	25,291,389	2.51	28,759,014	2.54	32,970,000	2.60	35,712,111	2.67	34,915,616	2.47
Inner Mongolia Autonomous Region	6,100,104	1.05	12,348,638	1.78	19,274,279	1.91	21,456,798	1.89	23,760,000	1.88	24,706,321	1.84	24,049,155	1.70
Rehe (now defunct)	5,160,822	0.89												
Liaoning	18,545,147	3.18	26,946,200	3.88	35,721,693	3.54	39,459,697	3.48	42,380,000	3.35	43,746,323	3.27	42,591,407	3.02
Jilin	11,290,073	1.94	15,668,663	2.26	22,560,053	2.24	24,658,721	2.18	27,280,000	2.16	27,462,297	2.05	24,073,453	1.71
Heilongjiang	11,897,309	2.04	20,118,271	2.90	32,665,546	3.24	35,214,873	3.11	39,890,000	2.91	38,312,224	2.86	31,850,088	2.26
Shanghai Municipality	6,204,417	1.06	10,816,458	1.56	11,859,748	1.18	13,341,896	1.18	16,740,000	1.32	23,019,148	1.72	24,870,895	1.76
Jiangsu	41,252,192	7.08	44,504,608	6.41	60,521,114	6.00	67,056,519	5.91	74,380,000	5.88	77,659,903	5.87	84,748,016	6.00
Zhejiang	22,865,747	3.92	28,318,573	4.08	38,884,603	3.86	41,445,930	3.66	46,770,000	3.69	54,426,891	4.06	64,567,588	4.57
Anhui	30,343,637	5.21	31,241,657	4.50	49,665,724	4.93	56,180,813	4.96	59,860,000	4.73	59,500,510	4.44	61,027,171	4.32
Fujian	13,142,721	2.26	16,757,223	2.41	25,931,106	2.57	30,097,274	2.65	34,710,000	2.74	36,894,216	2.75	41,540,086	2.94
Jiangxi	16,772,865	2.88	21,068,019	3.03	33,184,827	3.29	37,710,281	3.33	41,400,000	3.27	44,567,475	3.33	45,188,635	3.20
Shandong	48,876,548	8.39	55,519,038	7.99	74,419,054	7.38	84,392,827	7.44	90,790,000	7.17	95,793,065	7.15	101,527,453	7.19
Henan	44,214,594	7.59	50,325,511	7.25	74,422,739	7.38	85,509,535	7.54	92,560,000	7.31	94,023,567	7.02	99,365,519	7.04
Hubei	27,789,693	4.77	33,709,344	4.85	47,804,150	4.74	53,969,210	4.76	60,280,000	4.76	57,237,740	4.27	57,752,557	4.09
Hunan	33,226,954	5.70	37,182,286	5.35	54,008,851	5.36	60,659,754	5.35	64,440,000	5.09	65,683,722	4.90	66,444,864	4.71
Guangdong	34,770,059	5.97	42,800,849	6.16	59,299,220	5.88	62,829,236	5.54	86,420,000	6.83	104,303,132	7.79	126,012,510	8.93
Hainan	34,770,059	5.97	42,800,849	6.16	59,299,220	5.88	62,829,236	5.54	7,870,000	0.62	8,671,518	0.65	10,081,232	0.71
Guangxi Zhuang Autonomous Region	19,560,822	3.36	20,845,017	3.00	36,420,960	3.61	42,245,765	3.73	44,890,000	3.55	46,026,629	3.55	50,126,804	3.55
Sichuan	62,303,999	10.69	67,956,490	9.78	99,713,310	9.89	107,218,173	9.46	83,290,000	6.58	80,418,200	6.00	83,674,866	5.93
Chongqing Municipality (Note: Part of Sichuan until 1997.)									30,900,000	2.44	28,846,170	2.15	32,054,159	2.27
Guizhou	15,037,310	2.58	17,140,521	2.47	28,552,997	2.83	32,391,066	2.86	35,250,000	2.78	34,746,468	2.59	38,562,148	2.73
Yunnan	17,472,737	3.00	20,509,525	2.95	32,553,817	3.23	36,972,610	3.26	42,880,000	3.39	45,966,239	3.43	47,209,277	3.34
Tibet Autonomous Region	1,273,969	0.22	1,251,225	0.18	1,892,393	0.19	2,196,010	0.19	2,620,000	0.21	3,002,166	0.22	3,648,100	0.26
Xikang (now defunct)	3,381,064	0.58												
Shaanxi	15,881,281	2.73	20,766,915	2.99	28,904,423	2.87	32,882,403	2.90	36,050,000	2.85	37,327,378	2.79	39,528,999	2.80
Gansu	12,093,600	2.06	12,630,569	1.82	19,569,261	1.94	22,371,141	1.97	25,620,000	2.02	25,575,254	1.91	25,019,831	1.77
Ningxia Hui Autonomous Region	1,506,200	0.26	2,107,500	0.30	3,895,578	0.39	4,655,451	0.41	5,620,000	0.44	6,301,350	0.47	7,202,654	0.51
Qinghai	1,676,534	0.29	2,145,604	0.31	3,895,706	0.39	4,456,946	0.39	5,180,000	0.41	5,626,722	0.42	5,923,957	0.42
Xinjiang Uygur Autonomous Region	4,873,608	0.84	7,270,067	1.05	13,081,681	1.30	15,155,778	1.34	19,250,000	1.52	21,813,334	1.63	25,852,345	1.83
Military personnel					4,238,210		3,199,100		2,500,000		2,300,000		2,000,000	
Population with permanent residence difficult to define											4,649,985			
Total China	582,603,417		694,581,759		1,008,175,288		1,133,682,501		1,265,830,000		1,339,724,852		1,411,778,724	

=== Structure of the population ===
Census population of China by age and sex:

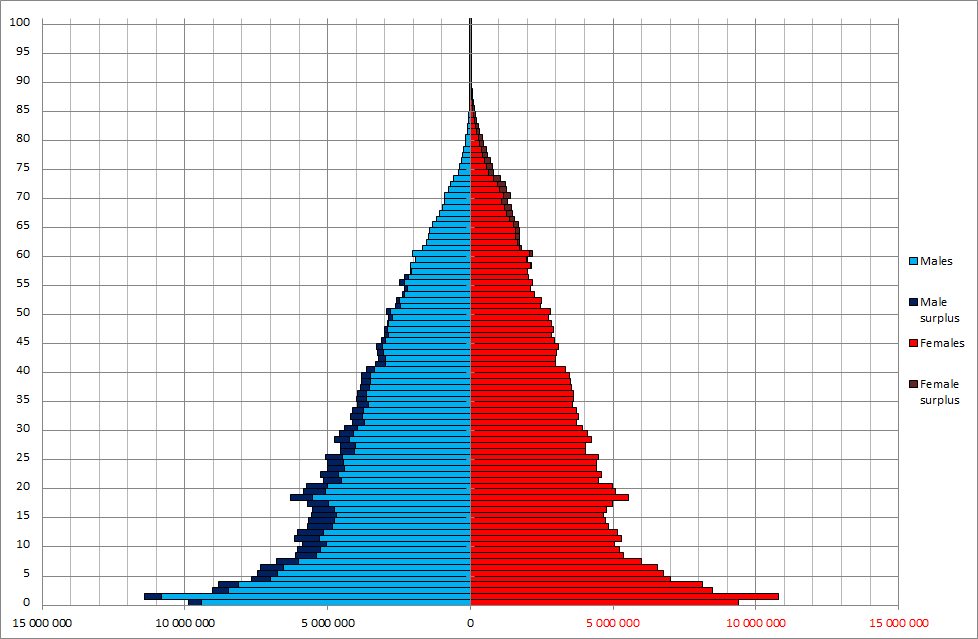
China population pyramid as of 1st National Census day on 30 June 1953

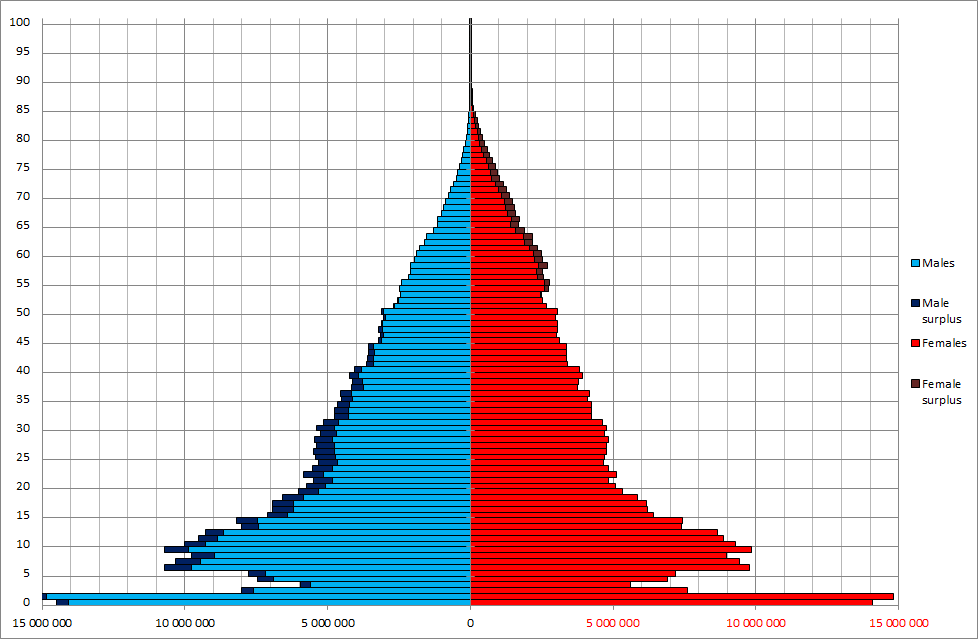
China population pyramid as of 2nd National Census day on 1 July 1964

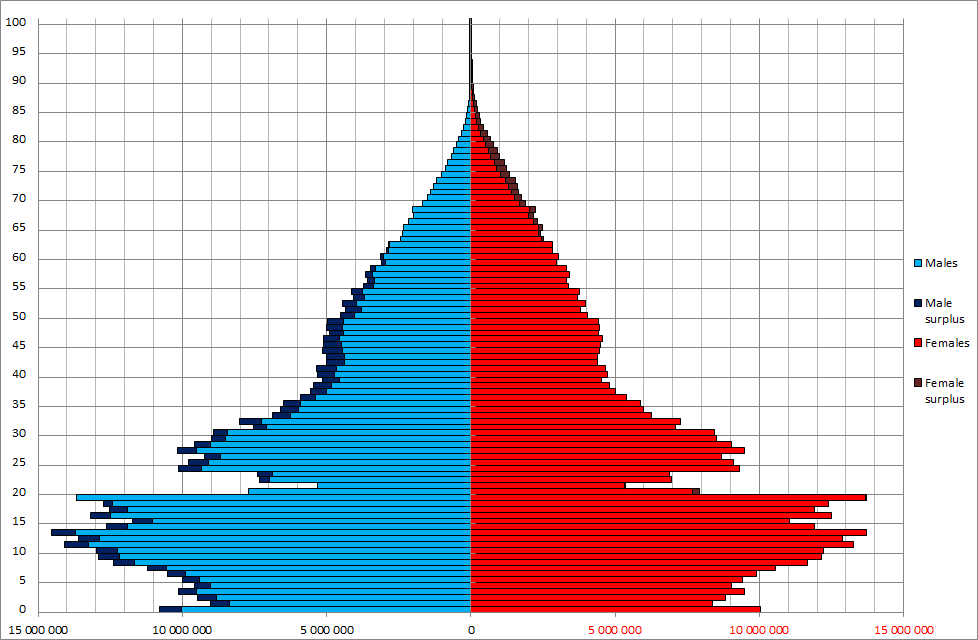
China population pyramid as of 3rd National Census day on 1 July 1982

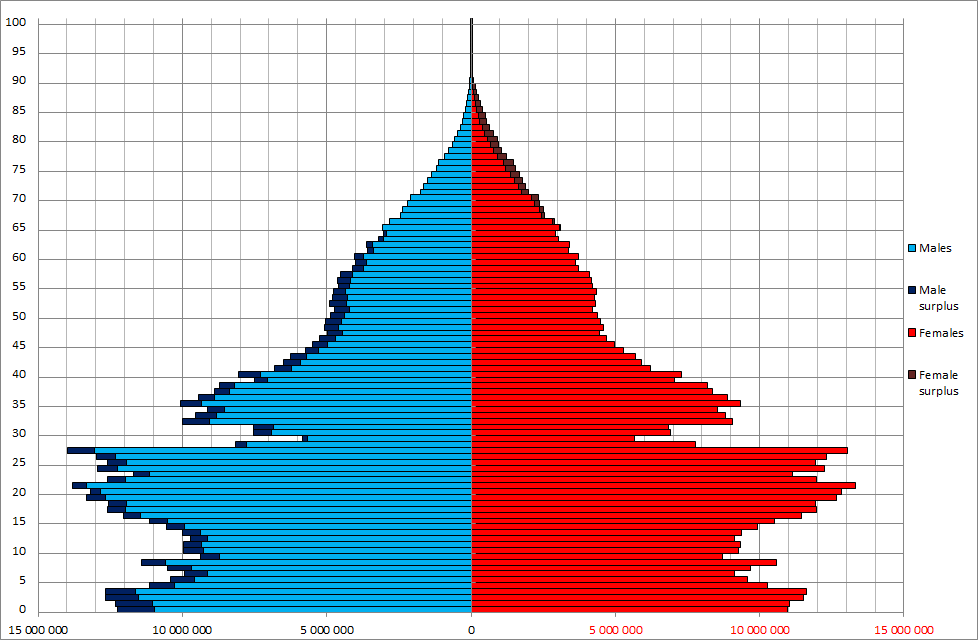
China population pyramid as of 4th National Census day on 1 July 1990

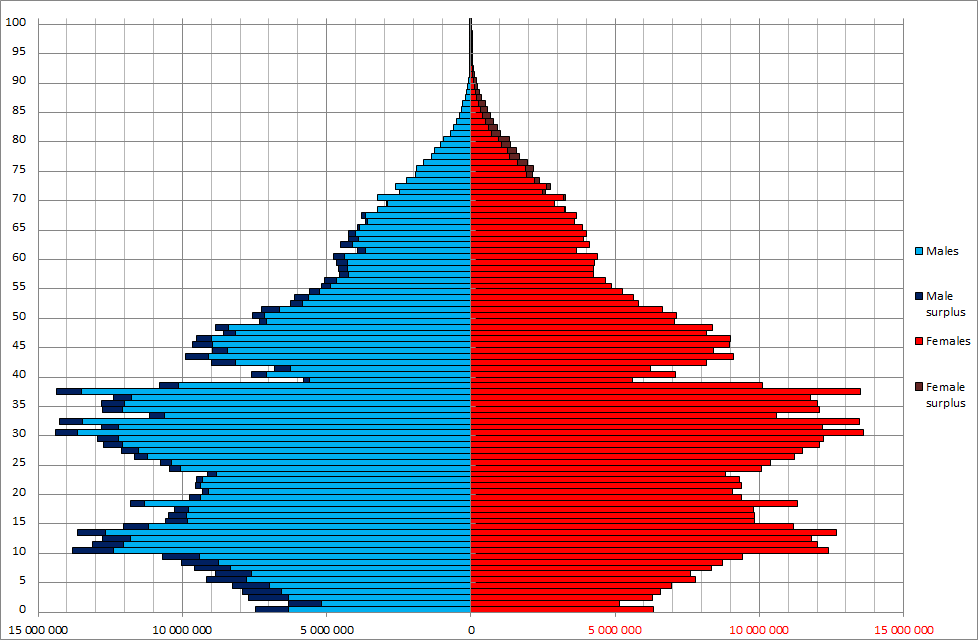
China population pyramid as of 5th National Census day on 1 November 2000

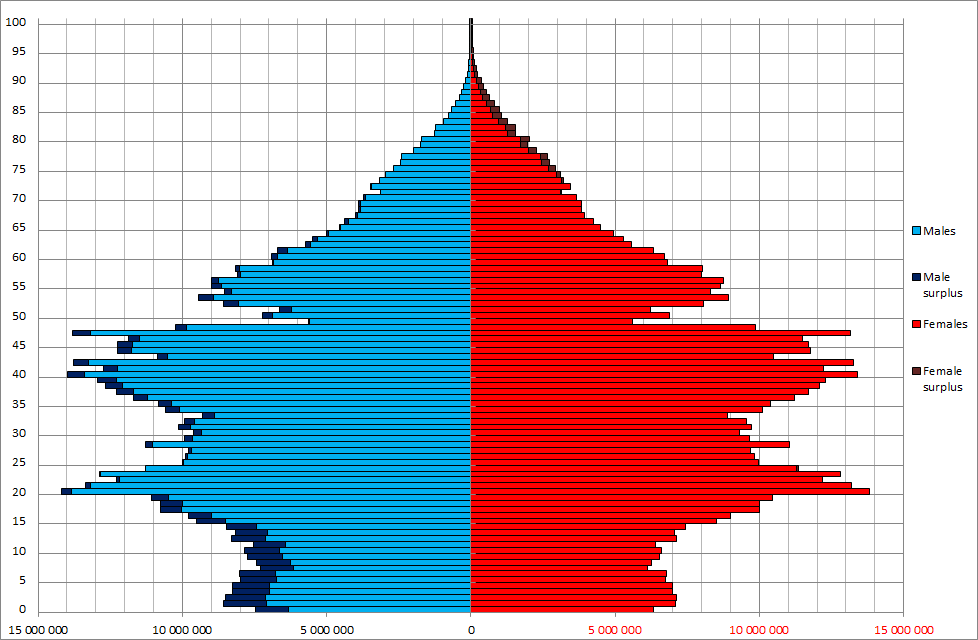
China population pyramid as of 6th National Census day on 1 November 2010

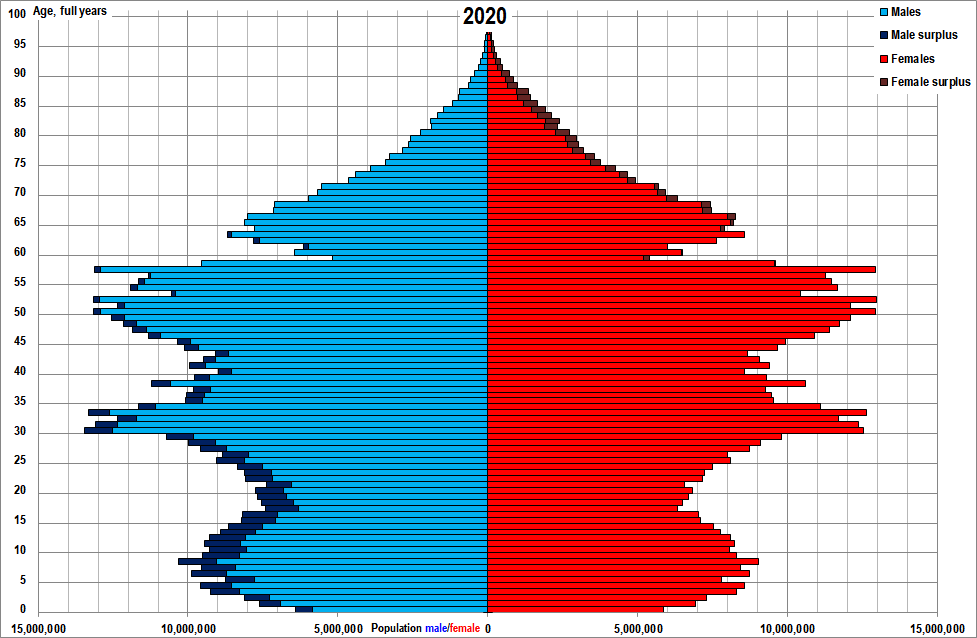
China population pyramid as of 7th National Census day on 1 November 2020

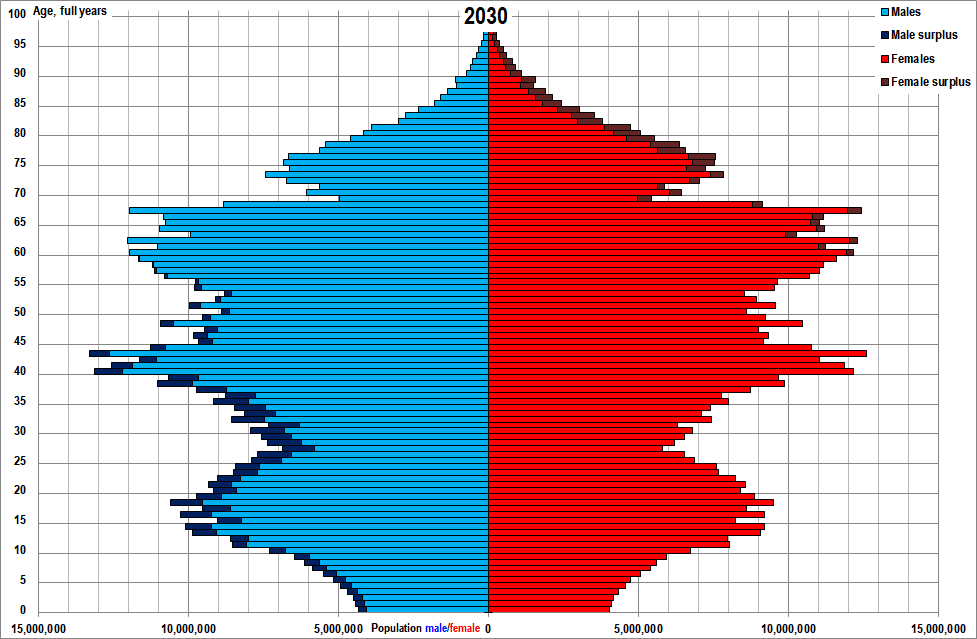
China population pyramid as projected of 8th National Census day on 1 November 2030, in scenario of constant TFR at 2021 level and continued improvements in mortality

Population pyramid of China from 1950 to 2022

Age structure projections for China up to 2100

Population by Sex and Age Group (as of 1 November 2010). For statistical purposes, the data for China do not include those for Hong Kong and Macau. Data exclude 2.3 million servicemen, 4.65 million persons with permanent resident status difficult to define, and 0.12 per cent undercount based on the post enumeration survey:

Age Group	Male	Female	Total	%
Total	682,329,104	650,481,765	1,332,810,869	100%
0–4	41,062,566	34,470,044	75,532,610	5.67%
5–9	38,464,665	32,416,884	70,881,549	5.32%
10–14	40,267,277	34,641,185	74,908,462	5.62%
15–19	51,904,830	47,984,284	99,889,114	7.49%
20–24	64,008,573	63,403,945	127,412,518	9.56%
25–29	50,837,038	50,176,814	101,013,852	7.58%
30–34	49,521,822	47,616,381	97,138,203	7.29%
35–39	60,391,104	57,634,855	118,025,959	8.86%
40–44	63,608,678	61,145,286	124,753,964	9.36%
45–49	53,776,418	51,818,135	105,594,553	7.92%
50–54	40,363,234	38,389,937	78,753,171	5.91%
55–59	41,082,938	40,229,536	81,312,474	6.10%
60–64	29,834,426	28,832,856	58,667,282	4.40%
65–69	20,748,471	20,364,811	41,113,282	3.08%
70–74	16,403,453	16,568,944	32,972,397	2.47%
75–79	11,278,859	12,573,274	23,852,133	1.79%
80–84	5,917,502	7,455,696	13,373,198	1.00%
85–89	2,199,810	3,432,118	5,631,928	0.42%
90–94	530,872	1,047,435	1,578,307	0.12%
95–99	117,716	252,263	369,979	0.03%
100+	8,852	27,082	35,934	<0.01%
Age group	Male	Female	Total	Percent
0–14	119,794,508	101,528,113	221,322,621	16.61%
15–64	505,329,061	487,232,029	992,561,090	74.47%
65+	57,205,535	61,721,623	118,927,158	8.92%

View source data.
View source data.
View source data.

=== Urbanization ===
Urbanization in the People's Republic of China increased in speed following the initiation of the reform and opening up policy. According to the Chinese government, the country's urbanization rate was 67 percent at end of 2024. According to the United Nations, the country's urbanization rate was 83.7 percent in 2025, having peaked in absolute numbers in 2021.

== Population policies ==
Birth rate in China

Initially, China's post-1949 leaders were ideologically disposed to view a large population as an asset. But soon afterwards, the leaders changed course. For one year, starting in August 1956, vigorous support was given to the Ministry of Public Health's mass birth control efforts. These efforts, however, had little impact on fertility. After the interval of the Great Leap Forward, Chinese leaders again saw rapid population growth as an obstacle to development, and their interest in birth control revived. In the early 1960s, schemes somewhat more muted than during the first campaign, emphasized the virtues of late marriage. Birth control offices were set up in the central government and some provincial-level governments in 1964. The second campaign was particularly successful in the cities, where the birth rate was cut in half during the 1963–66 period.

The one-child policy enjoyed much greater success in urban than in rural areas. Even without state intervention, there were compelling reasons for urban couples to limit the family to a single child. Raising a child required a significant portion of family income, and in the cities a child did not become an economic asset until he or she entered the work force at age sixteen. Couples with only one child were given preferential treatment in housing allocation. In addition, because city dwellers who were employed in state enterprises received pensions after retirement, the sex of their first child was less important to them than it was to those in rural areas.

Observers suggested that an accurate assessment of the one-child program would not be possible until all women who came of childbearing age in the early 1980s passed their fertile years. As of 1987 the one-child program had achieved mixed results. In general, it was very successful in almost all urban areas but less successful in rural areas.

Rapid fertility reduction associated with the one-child policy has potentially negative results. For instance, in the future the elderly might not be able to rely on their children to care for them as they have in the past, leaving the state to assume the expense, which could be considerable. Based on United Nations and Chinese government statistics, it was estimated in 1987 that by 2000 the population 60 years and older (the retirement age is 60 in urban areas) would number 127 million, or 10.1% of the total population; the projection for 2025 was 234 million elderly, or 16.4%. According to projections based on the 1982 census, if the one-child policy were maintained to the year 2000, 25% of China's population would be age 65 or older by 2040. In 2050, the number of people over 60 is expected to increase to 430 million. Even though China has already adopted a two-child policy since 2016, data shows that the second-child policy cannot stop the problem of an aging population. China needs to find an appropriate birth policy to optimize the demographic dividend, which refers to the proportion of labor-age population. On the other hand, higher house prices plays an important role on the influence of marriage and fertility. The increasing house prices leads to lower marriage rates and cause other serious social problems in China.

=== Forecasts ===
In 2024, United Nations researchers forecast China's population to fall to 639 million by 2100. The same year, researchers from Victoria University and the Shanghai Academy of Social Sciences forecast that China's population will fall to approximately 525 million by 2100 at current rates. This revision, reducing the population estimate to 525 million from a previous forecast of 597 million by 2100, indicates a sharper decline than previously anticipated. Demographer Yi Fuxian has raised concerns about the integrity of official birth rate data and estimated that China's population may fall to as low as 320 or 330 million by 2100.

=== Pro-natalist policies ===
In the 2020s, pro-natalist policies have been put in place to encourage people to have more children. As of 2024, China is the second most expensive country in which to raise a child. Specific policies have included lengthening of paid maternity leave, cash payments to mothers in some regions who have their second and third children, government-provided children's clothing and toys, increased child allowances, reduced taxes, government-subsidized fertility and pregnancy treatment, and new childcare facilities. Local government family-planning committees, previously used to enforce the one-child policy, are deployed for pro-natalist policies such as calling women to check on their menstrual cycle.

In July 2025, China announced an annual childcare subsidy of 3,600 yuan (about $500) until age three; this subsidy is estimated to impact about 20 million families. In December 2025, China announced an end to the value-add tax exemption on contraceptives and reimbursement for out-of-pocket childbirth expenses. In February 2026, the Cyberspace Administration of China mandated that social media platforms censor content deemed as spreading "fear of marriage" or "anxiety about childbirth."

== Vital statistics ==
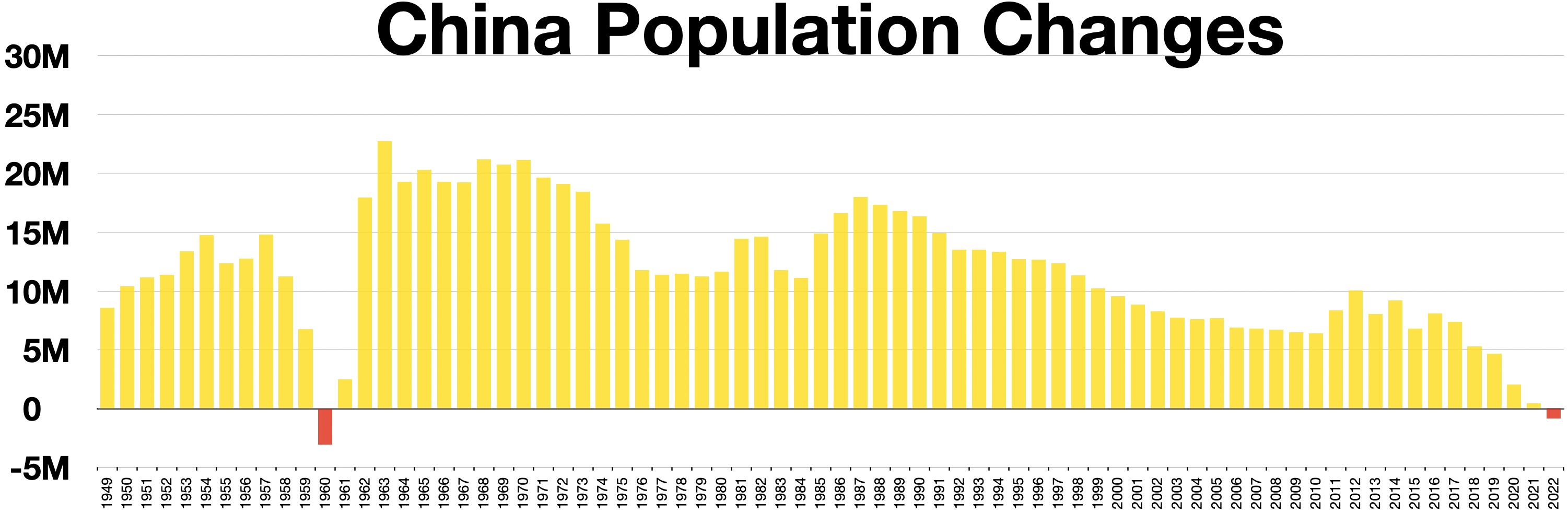
China population changes 1949 - 2022

Projection image outlining the decline of the Chinese population through 2100

=== Births and deaths since 1949 ===
Notable events in demography of China:

- 1958–1962 – Great Leap Forward
- 1976 – End of the Cultural Revolution
- 1979–2015 – One-child policy

	Year end population	Live births^{1}	Deaths^{1}	Natural change^{1}	Crude birth rate (per 1000)	Crude death rate (per 1000)	Natural change (per 1000)	Crude migration rate (per 1000)	Total fertility rate
1949	537,371,000	19,345,000	10,747,000	8,598,000	36.0	20.0	16.0		
1950	546,815,000	20,232,000	9,843,000	10,389,000	37.0	18.0	19.0	-1.4	5.29
1951	557,480,000	21,073,000	9,923,000	11,150,000	37.8	17.8	20.0	-0.5	
1952	568,910,000	21,050,000	9,671,000	11,379,000	37.0	17.0	20.0	0.5	
1953	581,390,000	21,511,000	8,139,000	13,372,000	37.0	14.0	23.0	-1.1	
1954	595,310,000	22,604,000	7,846,000	14,758,000	37.97	13.18	24.79	-0.8	
1955	608,655,000	19,842,000	7,474,000	12,368,000	32.60	12.28	20.32	2.1	5.98
1956	621,465,000	19,825,000	7,085,000	12,740,000	31.90	11.40	20.50	0.5	
1957	637,405,000	21,691,000	6,884,000	14,807,000	34.03	10.80	23.23	2.4	
1958	653,235,000	19,088,000	7,826,000	11,262,000	29.22	11.98	17.24	7.6	
1959	666,005,000	16,504,000	9,717,000	6,787,000	24.78	14.59	10.19	9.4	
1960	667,070,000	13,915,000	16,964,000	−3,049,000	20.86	25.43	−4.57	6.2	3.99
1961	660,330,000	11,899,000	9,403,000	2,496,000	18.02	14.24	3.78	-13.9	3.37
1962	665,770,000	24,640,000	6,671,000	17,969,000	37.01	10.02	26.99	-18.8	
1963	682,335,000	29,593,000	6,851,000	22,742,000	43.37	10.04	33.33	-8.4	6.88
1964	698,355,000	27,334,000	8,031,000	19,303,000	39.14	11.50	27.64	-4.2	
1965	715,185,000	27,091,000	6,794,000	20,297,000	37.88	9.50	28.38	-4.3	6.02
1966	735,400,000	25,776,000	6,494,000	19,282,000	35.05	8.83	26.22	2.0	
1967	754,550,000	25,625,000	6,361,000	19,264,000	33.96	8.43	25.53	0.5	
1968	774,510,000	27,565,000	6,359,000	21,206,000	35.59	8.21	27.38	-0.9	
1969	796,025,000	27,152,000	6,392,000	20,760,000	34.11	8.03	26.08	1.7	
1970	818,315,000	27,356,000	6,219,000	21,137,000	33.43	7.60	25.83	2.2	5.75
1971	841,105,000	25,780,000	6,157,000	19,623,000	30.65	7.32	23.33	4.5	
1972	862,030,000	25,663,000	6,560,000	19,103,000	29.77	7.61	22.16	2.7	
1973	881,940,000	24,633,000	6,209,000	18,424,000	27.93	7.04	20.89	2.2	
1974	900,350,000	22,347,000	6,609,000	15,738,000	24.82	7.34	17.48	3.4	
1975	916,395,000	21,086,000	6,708,000	14,378,000	23.01	7.32	15.69	2.1	3.58
1976	930,685,000	18,530,000	6,747,000	11,783,000	19.91	7.25	12.66	2.9	
1977	943,455,000	17,860,000	6,482,000	11,378,000	18.93	6.87	12.06	1.7	
1978	956,165,000	17,450,000	5,976,000	11,474,000	18.25	6.25	12.00	1.5	
1979	969,005,000	17,268,000	6,018,000	11,250,000	18.21	6.21	11.87	1.6	
1980	981,235,000	17,868,000	6,221,000	11,647,000	18.21	6.34	11.87	0.8	2.61
1981	993,885,000	20,782,000	6,321,000	14,461,000	20.91	6.36	14.55	-1.7	
1982	1,008,630,000	21,260,000	6,653,000	14,607,000	22.28	6.60	15.68	-0.8	
1983	1,023,310,000	18,996,000	7,223,000	11,773,000	20.19	6.90	13.29	1.3	
1984	1,036,825,000	18,022,000	6,890,000	11,132,000	19.90	6.82	13.08	0.1	
1985	1,051,040,000	21,994,000	7,087,000	14,907,000	21.04	6.78	14.26	-0.5	2.65
1986	1,066,790,000	23,928,000	7,318,000	16,610,000	22.43	6.86	15.57	-0.6	
1987	1,084,035,000	25,291,000	7,285,000	18,006,000	23.33	6.72	16.61	-0.4	
1988	1,101,630,000	24,643,000	7,315,000	17,328,000	22.37	6.64	15.73	0.5	
1989	1,118,650,000	24,140,000	7,316,000	16,824,000	21.58	6.54	15.04	0.4	
1990	1,135,185,000	23,910,000	7,570,000	16,340,000	21.06	6.67	14.39	0.4	2.43
1991	1,150,780,000	22,650,000	7,710,000	14,940,000	19.68	6.70	12.98	0.8	
1992	1,164,970,000	21,250,000	7,740,000	13,510,000	18.24	6.64	11.60	0.7	
1993	1,178,440,000	21,320,000	7,820,000	13,500,000	18.09	6.64	11.45	0.1	
1994	1,191,835,000	21,100,000	7,740,000	13,360,000	17.70	6.49	11.21	0.2	
1995	1,204,855,000	20,630,000	7,920,000	12,710,000	17.12	6.57	10.55	0.4	1.68
1996	1,217,550,000	20,670,000	7,990,000	12,680,000	16.98	6.56	10.42	0.1	
1997	1,230,075,000	20,380,000	8,010,000	12,370,000	16.57	6.51	10.06	0.2	
1998	1,241,935,000	19,420,000	8,070,000	11,350,000	15.64	6.50	9.14	0.5	
1999	1,252,735,000	18,340,000	8,090,000	10,250,000	14.64	6.46	8.18	0.5	
2000	1,262,645,000	17,710,000	8,140,000	9,570,000	14.03	6.45	7.58	0.3	1.45
2001	1,271,850,000	17,020,000	8,180,000	8,840,000	13.38	6.43	6.95	0.3	
2002	1,280,400,000	16,470,000	8,210,000	8,260,000	12.86	6.41	6.45	0.3	
2003	1,288,400,000	15,990,000	8,250,000	7,740,000	12.41	6.40	6.01	0.2	
2004	1,296,075,000	15,930,000	8,320,000	7,610,000	12.29	6.42	5.87	0.1	
2005	1,303,720,000	16,170,000	8,490,000	7,680,000	12.40	6.51	5.89	0	1.51
2006	1,311,020,000	15,850,000	8,930,000	6,920,000	12.09	6.81	5.28	0.3	1.50
2007	1,317,885,000	15,940,000	9,130,000	6,810,000	12.10	6.93	5.17	0.1	1.53
2008	1,324,655,000	16,080,000	9,350,000	6,730,000	12.14	7.06	5.08	0.1	1.55
2009	1,331,260,000	15,910,000	9,430,000	6,480,000	11.95	7.08	4.87	0.1	1.54
2010	1,337,705,000	15,920,000	9,510,000	6,410,000	11.90	7.11	4.79	0.1	1.54
2011	1,345,035,000	17,970,000	9,600,000	8,370,000	13.27	7.14	6.13	-0.7	
2012	1,354,190,000	19,730,000	9,660,000	10,070,000	14.57	7.13	7.43	-0.6	
2013	1,363,240,000	17,760,000	9,720,000	8,040,000	13.03	7.13	5.9	0.8	
2014	1,371,860,000	18,970,000	9,770,000	9,200,000	13.83	7.12	6.71	-0.4	
2015	1,379,860,000	16,550,000	9,750,000	6,800,000	11.99	7.07	4.93	0.9	1.57
2016	1,387,790,000	17,860,000	9,770,000	8,090,000	12.95	7.09	5.86	-0.1	1.70
2017	1,396,215,000	17,230,000	9,860,000	7,370,000	12.64	7.06	5.58	0.5	1.67
2018	1,402,760,000	15,230,000	9,930,000	5,300,000	10.86	7.08	3.78	0.9	1.55
2019	1,407,745,000	14,650,000	9,980,000	4,670,000	10.41	7.09	3.32	0.2	1.50
2020	1,411,100,000	12,020,000	9,970,000	2,050,000	8.52	7.07	1.45	0.9	1.30
2021	1,412,360,000	10,620,000	10,140,000	480,000	7.52	7.18	0.34	0.6	1.16
2022	1,411,750,000	9,560,000	10,410,000	−850,000	6.77	7.37	−0.60	0.2	1.07
2023	1,409,670,000	9,020,000	11,100,000	−2,080,000	6.39	7.87	−1.48	0.0	1.04
2024	1,408,280,000	9,540,000	10,930,000	−1,390,000	6.77	7.76	−0.99	0.0	1.13
2025	1,404,890,000	7,920,000	11,310,000	−3,390,000	5.63	8.04	−2.41	0.0	0.93

View source data.

=== Total fertility rate by region ===
According to the 2000 census, the TFR was 1.22 (0.86 for cities, 1.08 for towns and 1.43 for villages/outposts). Beijing had the lowest TFR at 0.67, while Guizhou had the highest at 2.19. The Xiangyang district of Jiamusi city (Heilongjiang) has a TFR of 0.41, which is the lowest TFR recorded anywhere in the world in recorded history. Other extremely low TFR counties are: 0.43 in the Heping district of Tianjin city (Tianjin), and 0.46 in the Mawei district of Fuzhou city (Fujian). At the other end TFR was 3.96 in Geji County (Tibet), 4.07 in Jiali County (Tibet), and 5.47 in Baqing County (Tibet).

The 2010 census reported a TFR of 1.18 (0.88 in cities, 1.15 in townships, and 1.44 in rural areas). The five regions with the lowest fertility rates were Beijing (0.71), Shanghai (0.74), Liaoning (0.74), Heilongjiang (0.75), and Jilin (0.76). The five regions with the highest fertility rates were Guangxi (1.79), Guizhou (1.75), Xinjiang (1.53), Hainan (1.51), and Anhui (1.48).

The 2020 census reported a TFR of 1.301, with 1.118 in cities, 1.395 in townships, and 1.543 in rural areas. The shift of fertility rate recorded in 2020 census compared to that in the previous 2 censuses may not be an actual recovery, but rather due to the low quality and massive underreporting of lower-age groups in the 2000 and 2010 censuses, while the population control policy in China back then may also give families an incentive to hide their children, which is largely relieved as the policy changed in 2010s. This can be demonstrated by the much lower number of population aged 0~4 and 5~9 in the 2000 and 2010 censuses when compared to the corresponding age groups in 2020.

Total fertility rate by ethnic group (2010 census): Han (1.14), Zhuang (1.59), Hui (1.48), Manchu (1.18), Uyghur (2.04), Miao (1.82), Yi (1.82), Tujia (1.74), Tibetan (1.60), Mongols (1.26).

In 2025, China's population decreased by 3.39 million, with 7.92 million births outpaced by 11.31 million deaths. The country's population stands at 1.4 billion, still the world's second-largest after India. The birth rate fell to 5.63 births per 1,000 people, down from 6.39 in 2023, continuing a steady decline since 2016. Despite a slight uptick in 2024, the trend suggests no reversal. The decline follows years of strict "one-child" policy until its end in 2016 and mirrors patterns seen in other countries like Japan and South Korea, where rising education levels, changing attitudes toward marriage, urbanization, and high child-rearing costs contribute to falling birth rates. Chinese demographer Liang Zhongtang estimated that China's total fertility rate in 2024 fell to 0.7, who stated that the country's population figures had been manipulated for decades.

=== Total fertility rate from 1930 to 1949 ===
These are estimates as there are no registry data for that period. Sources: Our World In Data and Gapminder Foundation.

Years	1930	1931	1932	1933	1934	1935	1936	1937	1938	1939	1940
Total fertility rate in China	5.5	5.47	5.45	5.43	5.4	5.38	5.35	5.32	5.3	5.28	5.25

Years	1941	1942	1943	1944	1945	1946	1947	1948	1949
Total fertility rate in China	5.15	5.06	4.96	4.86	4.77	5	5.2	4.91	5.54

=== Life expectancy ===
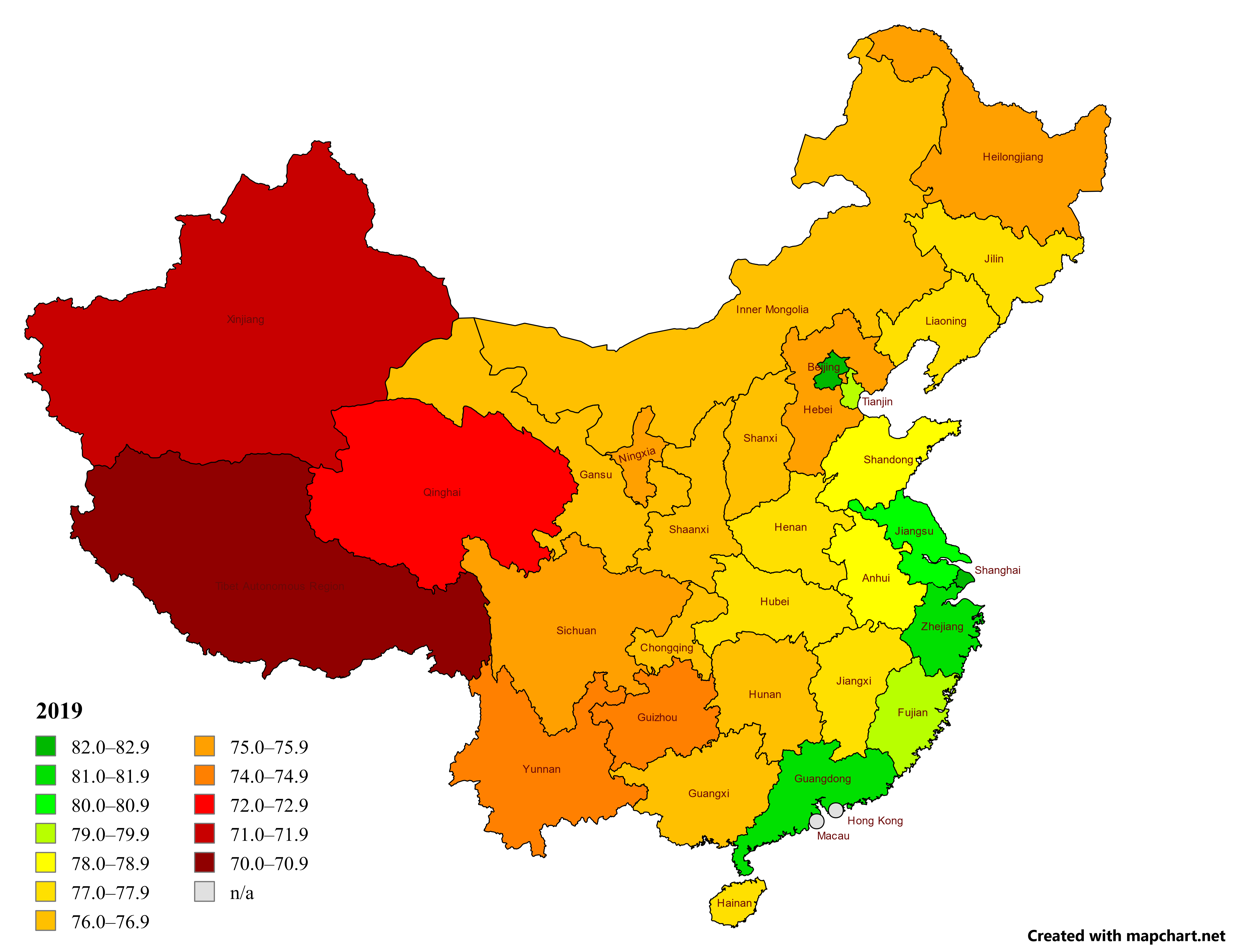
Map of Chinese regions by life expectancy in 2019

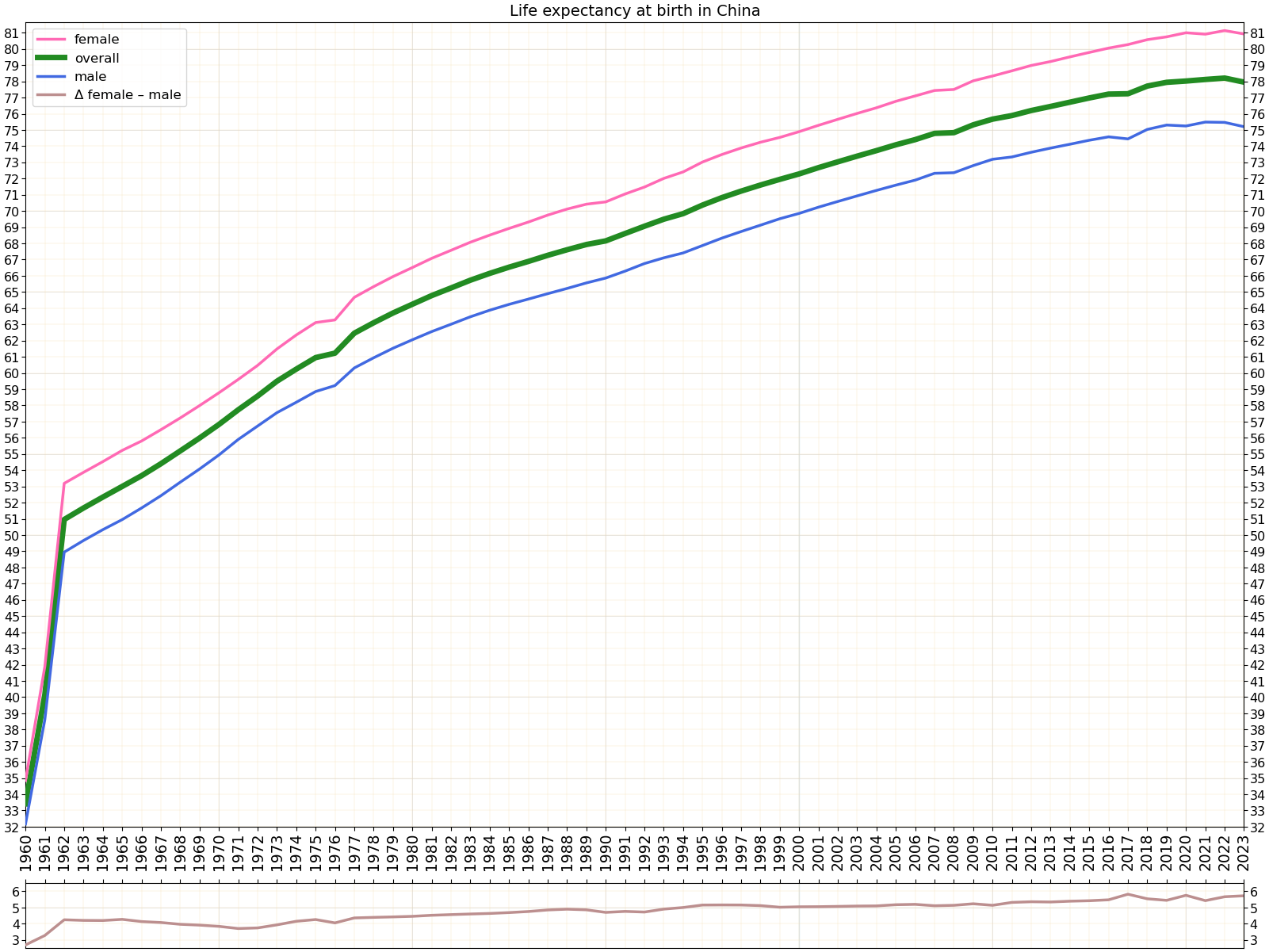
Life expectancy in China since 1960 by gender

Source: UN World Population Prospects

Period	Life expectancy in Years	Period	Life expectancy in Years
1950–1955	43.8	1985–1990	68.9
1955–1960	44.5	1990–1995	69.7
1960–1965	44.6	1995–2000	70.9
1965–1970	55.5	2000–2005	73.1
1970–1975	61.7	2005–2010	74.7
1975–1980	65.5	2010–2015	75.7
1980–1985	67.8	2023	78.6

=== Fertility and mortality ===
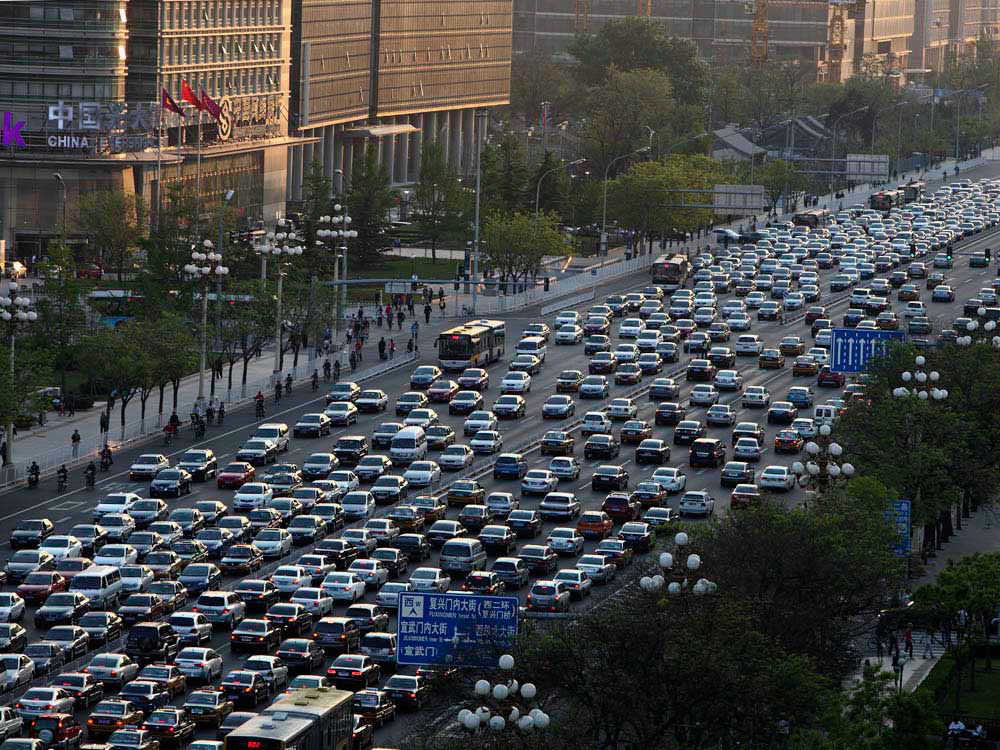
Traffic in Beijing

Beginning in the early 1950s, mortality steadily declined; it continued to decline through 1978 and remained relatively constant through 1987. One major fluctuation was reported in a computer reconstruction of China's population trends from 1953 to 1987 produced by the United States Bureau of the Census. The computer model showed that the crude death rate increased dramatically during the famine years associated with the Great Leap Forward (1958–60).

China exhibits a serious gender imbalance. Census data obtained in 2000 revealed that 119 boys were born for every 100 girls, and among China's "floating population" the ratio was as high as 128:100. These situations led the government in July 2004 to ban selective abortions of female fetuses. It is estimated that this imbalance will rise until 2025–2030 to reach 20% then slowly decrease.

In the 2020s, cash incentives have been offered to increase birth rates. Local government family-planning committees, previously used to enforce the one-child policy, are deployed for pro-natalist policies such as calling women to check on their menstrual cycle.

==== Censorship of data ====
Although the National Bureau of Statistics of China reported 9.02 million births in 2023, the state-owned Mother and Infant Daily newspaper reported there were 7.88 million births for the same year. The report was promptly censored following publication.

=== Labor force ===
In 2012, for the first time, according to the National Bureau of Statistics in January 2013, the number of people theoretically able to enter the Chinese labor force (individuals aged 15 to 59), shrank slightly to 937.27 million, a decrease of 3.45 million from 2011. This trend, resulting from a demographic transition, is anticipated to continue until at least 2030. The World Factbook estimated the 2019 active labor force was 774.71 million.

=== Gender balance ===
Future challenges for China will be the gender disparity. According to the 2020 census, males account for 51.24% of China's 1.41 billion people, while females made up 48.76% of the total. The sex ratio (the number of males for each female in a population) at birth was 118.06 boys to every 100 girls (54.14%) in 2010, higher than the 116.86 (53.89%) of 2000, but 0.53 points lower than the ratio of 118.59 (54.25%) in 2005.

== Ethnic groups ==
The People's Republic of China (PRC) officially recognizes 56 distinct ethnic groups, the largest of which are Han, who constitute 91.51% of the total population in 2010. Ethnic minorities constitute 8.49% or 113.8 million of China's population in 2010. During the past decades ethnic minorities have experienced higher growth rates than the majority Han population, because they are not under the one-child policy. Their proportion of the population in China has grown from 6.1% in 1953, to 8.04% in 1990, 8.41% in 2000, and 8.49% in 2010. Large ethnic minorities (data according to the 2000 census) include the Zhuang (16 million, 1.28%), Manchu (10 million, 0.84%), Uyghur (9 million, 0.78%), Hui (9 million, 0.71%), Miao (8 million, 0.71%), Yi (7 million, 0.61%), Tujia (5.75 million, 0.63%), Mongols (5 million, 0.46%), Tibetan (5 million, 0.43%), Buyei (3 million, 0.23%), and Korean (2 million, 0.15%). Over 126,000 Westerners from Canada, the US and Europe are living in mainland China.

According to Barry Sautman, the minority population has increased faster than the national population in recent decades. In 2020, 8.9% of Chinese were ethnic minorities, up from 6.7% in 1982.

Population of China according to ethnic group in censuses 1953–2020
Ethnic group	Language family	1953	%	1964	%	1982	%	1990	%	2000	%	2010	%	2020	%
Han	Sino-Tibetan	547,283,057	93.94	651,296,368	94.22	936,703,824	93.30	1,039,187,548	91.92	1,137,386,112	91.53	1,220,844,520	91.60	1,286,310,000	91.11
Minority groups		35,320,360	6.06	39,883,909	5.78	67,233,254	6.67	90,570,743	8.01	105,225,173	8.47	111,966,349	8.40	125,470,000	8.89
Zhuang	Tai–Kadai	6,611,455	1.13	8,386,140	1.21	13,441,900	1.32	15,555,820	1.38	16,178,811	1.28	16,926,381	1.27	19,568,546	1.39
Uyghurs	Turkic	3,640,125	0.62	3,996,311	0.58	5,917,030	0.59	7,207,024	0.64	8,399,393	0.66	10,069,346	0.76	11,774,538	0.84
Hui	Sino-Tibetan	3,559,350	0.61	4,473,147	0.64	7,207,780	0.71	8,612,001	0.76	9,816,802	0.78	10,586,087	0.79	11,377,914	0.81
Miao	Hmong–Mien	2,511,339	0.43	2,782,088	0.40	5,017,260	0.50	7,383,622	0.65	8,940,116	0.71	9,426,007	0.71	11,067,929	0.79
Manchu	Tungusic	2,418,931	0.42	2,695,675	0.39	4,299,950	0.43	9,846,776	0.87	10,682,263	0.84	10,387,958	0.78	10,423,303	0.74
Yi	Sino-Tibetan	3,254,269	0.56	3,380,960	0.49	5,492,330	0.54	6,578,524	0.58	7,762,286	0.61	8,714,393	0.65	9,830,327	0.70
Tujia	Sino-Tibetan					284,900	0.03	5,725,049	0.51	8,028,133	0.63	8,353,912	0.63	9,587,732	0.68
Tibetans	Sino-Tibetan	2,775,622	0.48	2,501,174	0.36	3,821,950	0.38	4,593,072	0.41	5,416,021	0.43	6,282,187	0.47	7,060,731	0.50
Mongols	Mongolic	1,462,956	0.25	1,965,766	0.28	3,402,200	0.34	4,802,407	0.42	5,813,947	0.46	5,981,840	0.45	6,290,204	0.45
Buyei	Tai–Kadai	1,247,883	0.21	1,348,055	0.19	2,103,150	0.21	2,548,294	0.22	2,971,460	0.23	2,870,034	0.22	3,576,752	0.25
Dong	Tai–Kadai	712802		836123		1,446,190	0.14	2,508,624	0.22	2,960,293	0.24	2,879,974	0.22	3,495,993	0.25
Yao	Hmong–Mien	665933		857265		1,414,870	0.14	2,137,033	0.19	2,637,421	0.21	2,796,003	0.21	3,309,341	0.23
Bai	Sino-Tibetan	567119		706623		1,147,360	0.11	1,598,052	0.14	1,858,063	0.15	1,933,510	0.15	2,091,543	0.15
Hani	Sino-Tibetan	481220		628727		1,063,300	0.11	1,254,800	0.11	1,439,673	0.12	1,660,932	0.12	1,733,166	0.12
Korean	Koreanic	1,120,405	0.19	1,339,569	0.19	1,783,150	0.18	1,923,361	0.17	1,923,842	0.15	1,830,929	0.14	1,702,479	0.12
Li	Tai–Kadai	360950		438813		882,030	0.09	1,112,498	0.10	1,247,814	0.10	1,463,064	0.11	1,602,104	0.11
Kazakh	Turkic	509375		491637		878,570	0.09	1,110,758	0.10	1,250,458	0.10	1,462,588	0.11	1,562,518	0.11
Dai	Tai–Kadai	478966		535389		864,340	0.09	1,025,402	0.09	1,158,989	0.09	1,261,311	0.09	1,329,985	0.09
She	Hmong–Mien			234167		379,080	0.04	634,700	0.06	709,592	0.06	708,651	0.05		
Lisu	Sino-Tibetan	317465		270628		466,760	0.05	574,589	0.05	634,912	0.05	702,839	0.05		
Gelao	Tai–Kadai			26852		59,810	0.01	438,192	0.04	579,357	0.05	550,746	0.04		
Dongxiang	Mongolic	155761		147443		279523	–	373,669	0.03	513,805	0.04	621,500	0.05		
Gaoshan	Austronesian	329		366		1,750	0.00	2,877	0.00	4,461	0.00	4,009	0.00		
Lahu	Sino-Tibetan	139060		191241		320,350	0.03	411,545	0.04	453,705	0.04	485,966	0.04		
Sui	Tai–Kadai	133566		156099		300,690	0.03	347,116	0.03	406,902	0.03	411,847	0.03		
Va	Mon–Khmer	286158		200272		271,050	0.03	351,980	0.03	396,610	0.03	429,709	0.03		
Nakhi	Sino-Tibetan	143453		156796		248,650	0.02	277,750	0.02	308,839	0.02	326,295	0.02		
Qiang	Sino-Tibetan	35660		49105		109,760	0.01	198,303	0.02	306,072	0.02	309,576	0.02		
Tu	Mongolic	53277		77349		148,760	0.01	192,568	0.02	241,198	0.02	289,565	0.02		
Mulao	Tai–Kadai			52819		91,790	0.01	160,648	0.01	207,352	0.02	216,257	0.02		
Xibe	Tungusic	19022		33438		77,560	0.01	172,932	0.02	188,824	0.02	190,481	0.01		
Kyrgyz	Turkic	70944		70151		108,790	0.01	143,537	0.01	160,823	0.01	186,708	0.01		
Daur	Mongolic			63394		94126	–	121,463	0.01	132,143	0.01	131,992	0.01		
Jingpo	Sino-Tibetan	101852		57762		100,180	0.01	119,276	0.01	132,143	0.01	147,828	0.01		
Maonan	Tai–Kadai			22382		37,450	0.00	72,370	0.01	107,106	0.01	101,192	0.01		
Salar	Turkic	30658		69135		68,030	0.01	82,398	0.01	104,503	0.01	130,607	0.01		
Blang	Mon–Khmer			39411		58473	–	87,546	0.01	91,882	0.01	119,639	0.01		
Tajik	Indo-European	14462		16236		27,430	0.00	33,223	0.00	41,028	0.00	51,069	0.00		
Achang	Sino-Tibetan			12032		31,490	0.00	27,718	0.00	33,936	0.00	39,555	0.00		
Pumi	Sino-Tibetan			14298		18,860	0.00	29,721	0.00	33,600	0.00	42,861	0.00		
Ewenki	Tungusic	4957		9681		19,440	0.00	26,379	0.00	30,505	0.00	30,875	0.00		
Nu	Sino-Tibetan			15047		25,980	0.00	27,190	0.00	28,759	0.00	37,523	0.00		
Gin (Vietnamese)	Mon–Khmer					12,140	0.00	18,749	0.00	22,517	0.00	28,199	0.00		
Jino	Sino-Tibetan					11,260	0.00	18,022	0.00	20,899	0.00	23,143	0.00		
De'ang	Mon–Khmer					–	–	15,461	0.00	17,935	0.00	20,556	0.00		
Bonan	Mongolic	4957		5125		6,620	0.00	11,683	0.00	16,505	0.00	20,074	0.00		
Russian	Indo-European	22656		1326		2,830	0.00	13,500	0.00	15,609	0.00	15,393	0.00		
Yugur	Turkic	3861		5717		7,670	0.00	12,293	0.00	13,719	0.00	14,378	0.00		
Uzbek	Turkic	13626		7717		13,810	0.00	14,763	0.00	13,370	0.00	10,569	0.00		
Monba	Sino-Tibetan			3809		1,040	0.00	7,498	0.00	8,923	0.00	10,561	0.00		
Oroqen	Tungusic	2262		2709		2,280	0.00	7,004	0.00	8,196	0.00	8,659	0.00		
Derung	Sino-Tibetan					4,250	0.00	5,825	0.00	7,426	0.00	6,930	0.00		
Chinese Tatars	Turkic	6929		2294		7,510	0.00	5,064	0.00	4,890	0.00	3,556	0.00		
Hezhen	Tungusic			718		670	0.00	4,254	0.00	4,640	0.00	5,354	0.00		
Lhoba	Sino-Tibetan					1,030	0.00	2,322	0.00	2,965	0.00	3,682	0.00		
Unrecognized						3,370,880	0.33	3,498	0.00	734,379	0.06	640,101	0.05		
Unknown						4,720	0.00	752,347	0.07	–	–	–	–		
Naturalized						–	–	–	–	941	0.00	1,448	0.00		
Total China		582,603,417		694,581,759		1,008,175,288		1,133,682,501		1,242,612,226		1,332,810,869		1,411,778,724	

Maps of ethnic groups in China

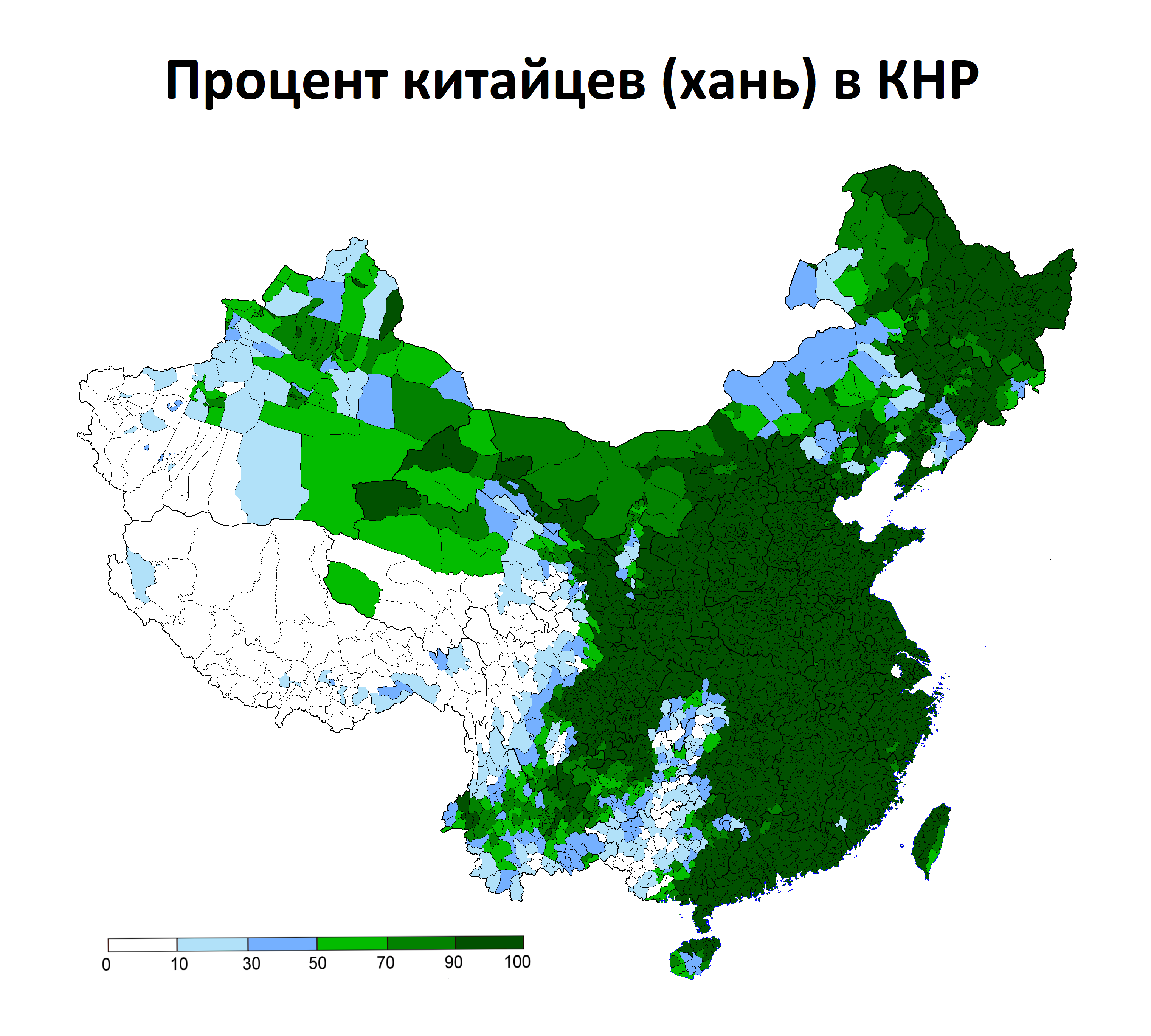
Map of the Han (91.11%), natives of Inner China.

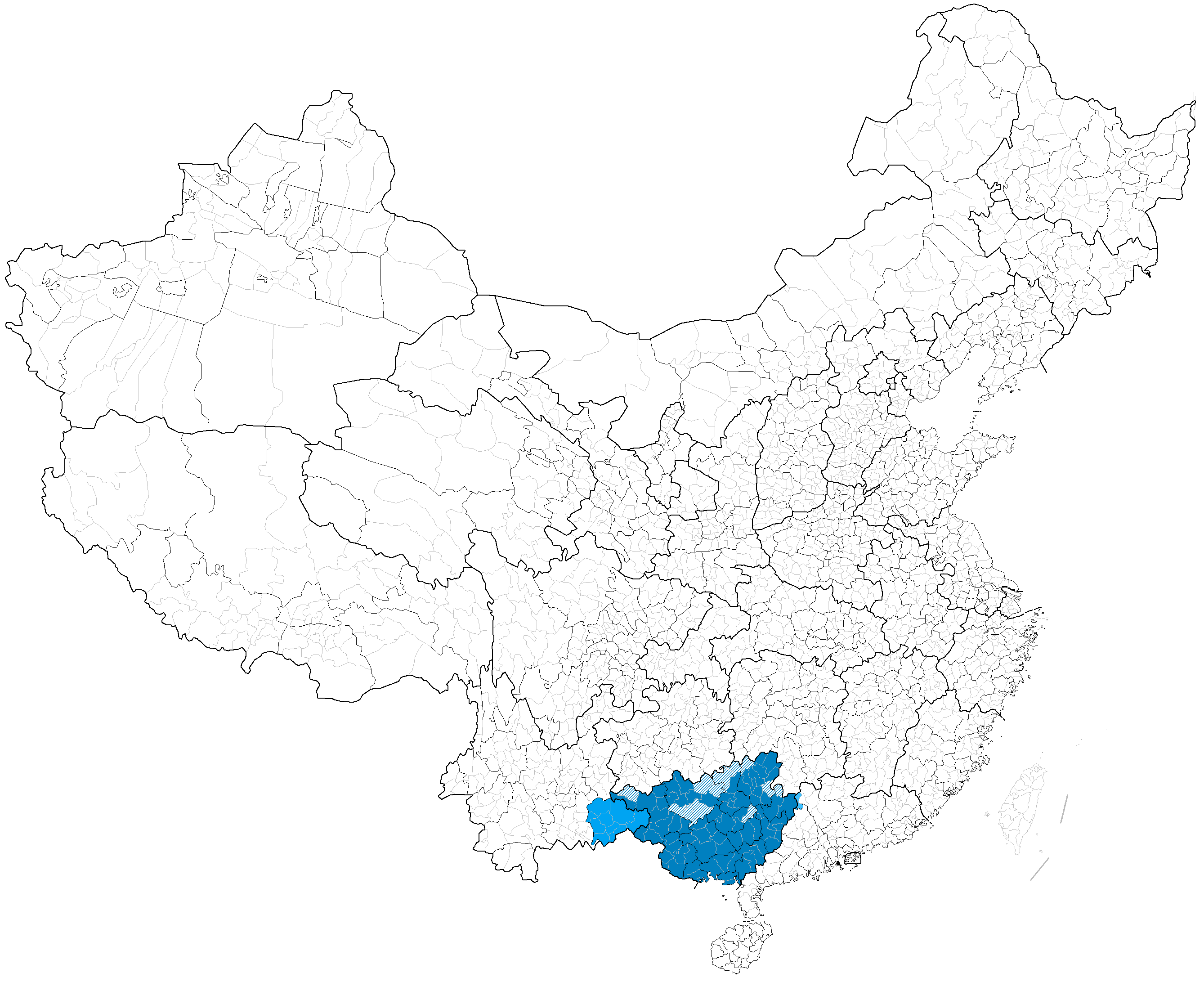
Map of the Zhuang (1.39%), natives of Guangxi.

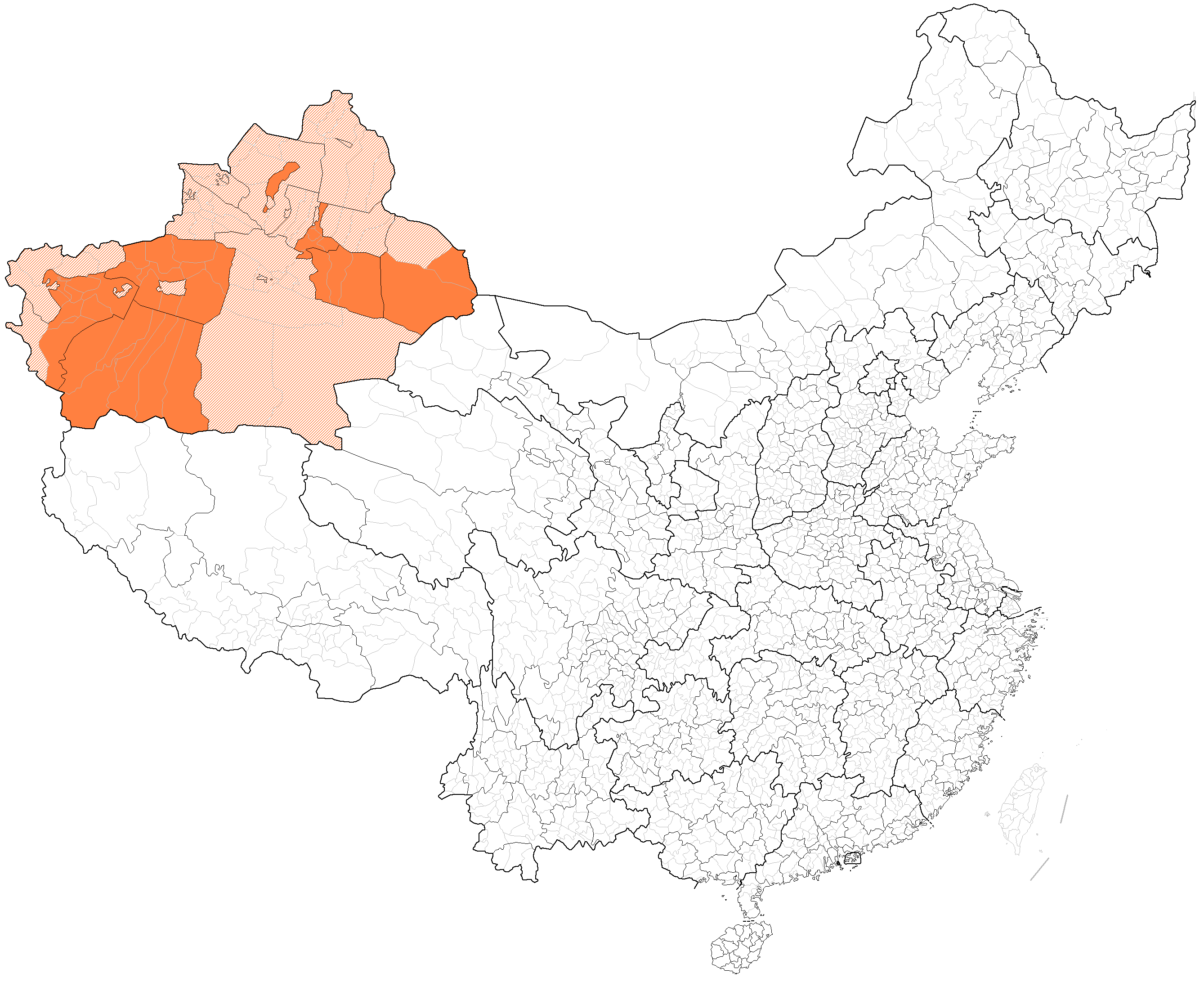
Map of the Uyghurs (0.84%), natives of Xinjiang.

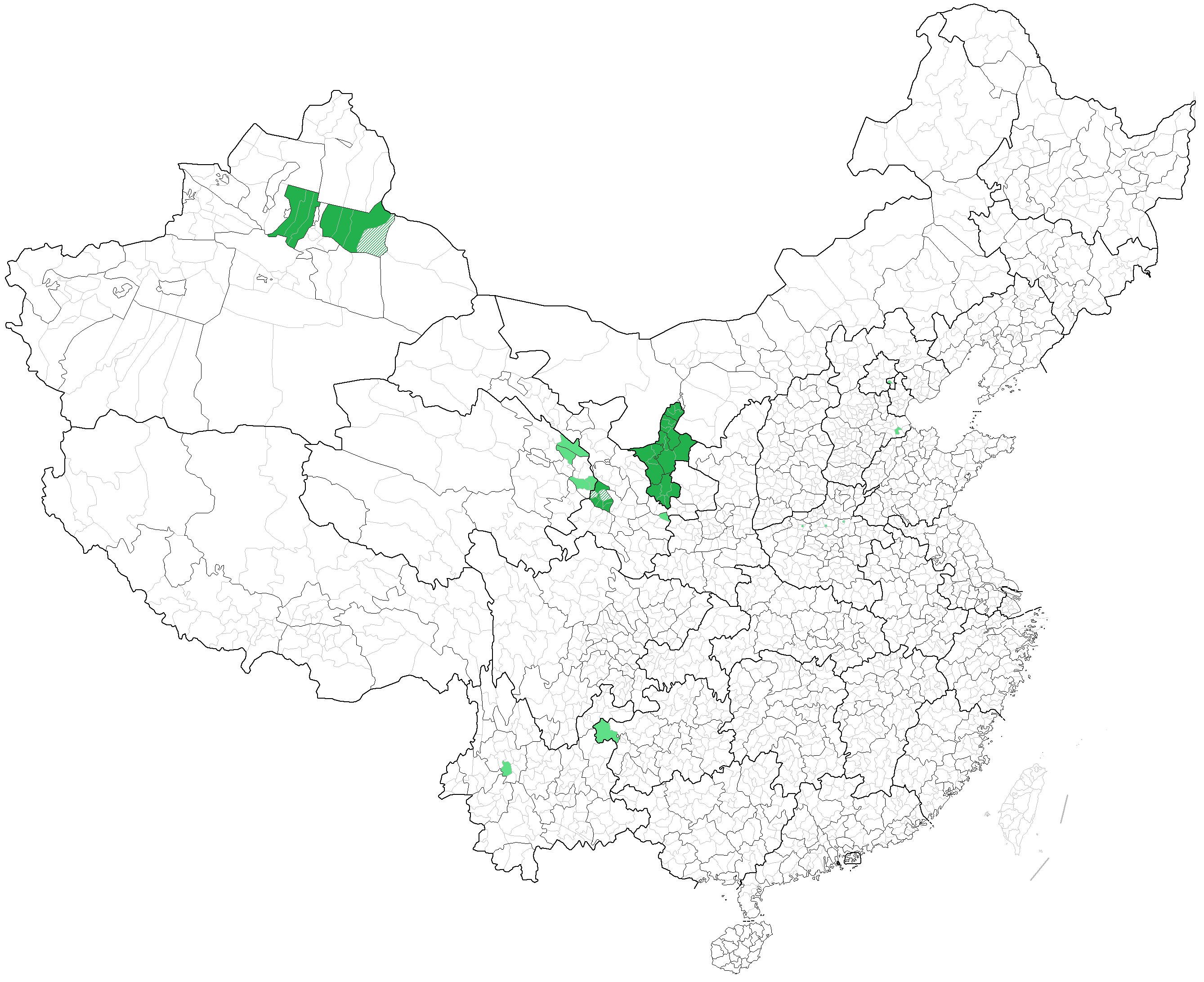
Map of the Hui (0.81%), natives of Ningxia.

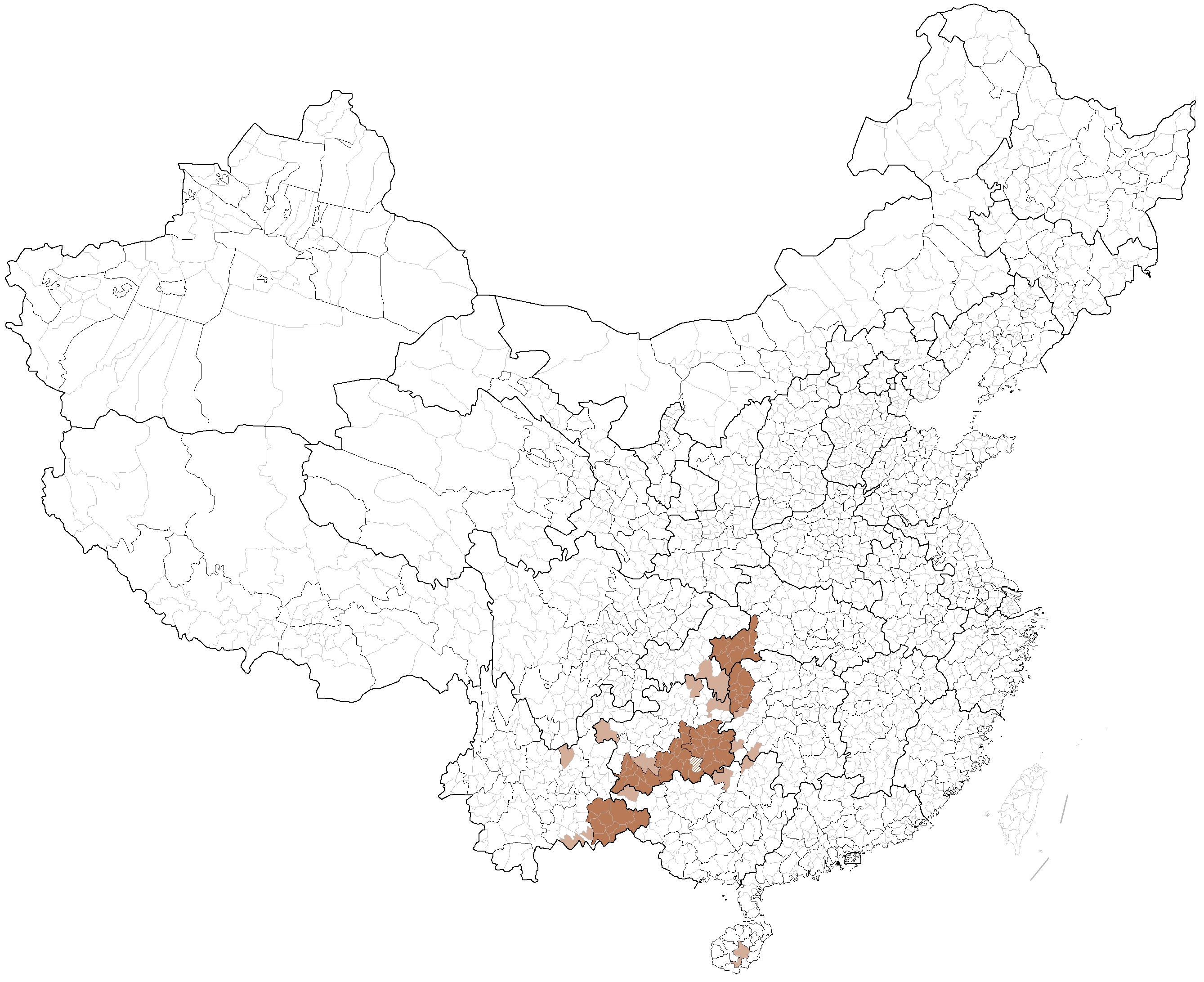
Map of the Miao (0.79%).

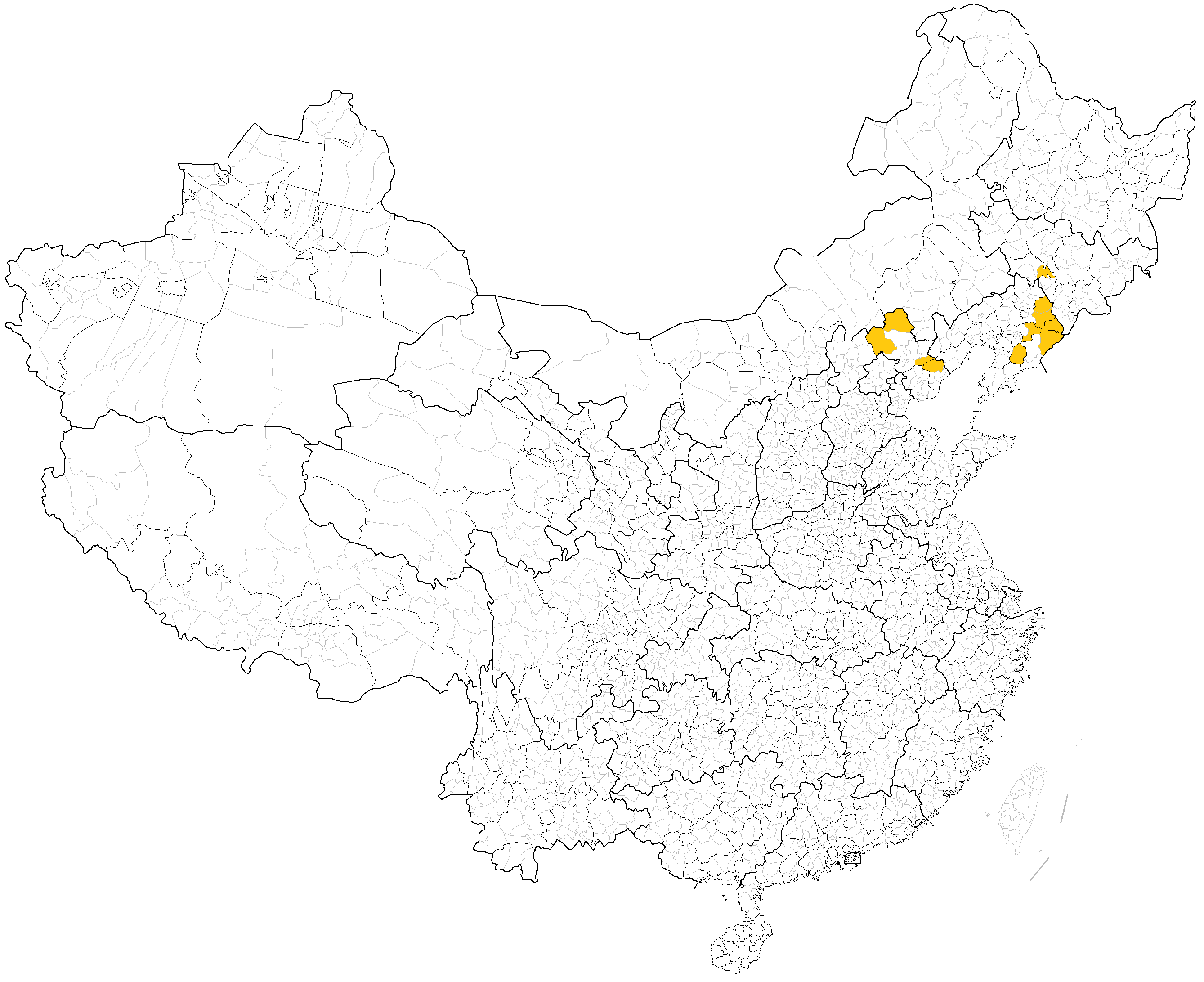
Map of the Manchus (0.74%), natives of Manchuria.

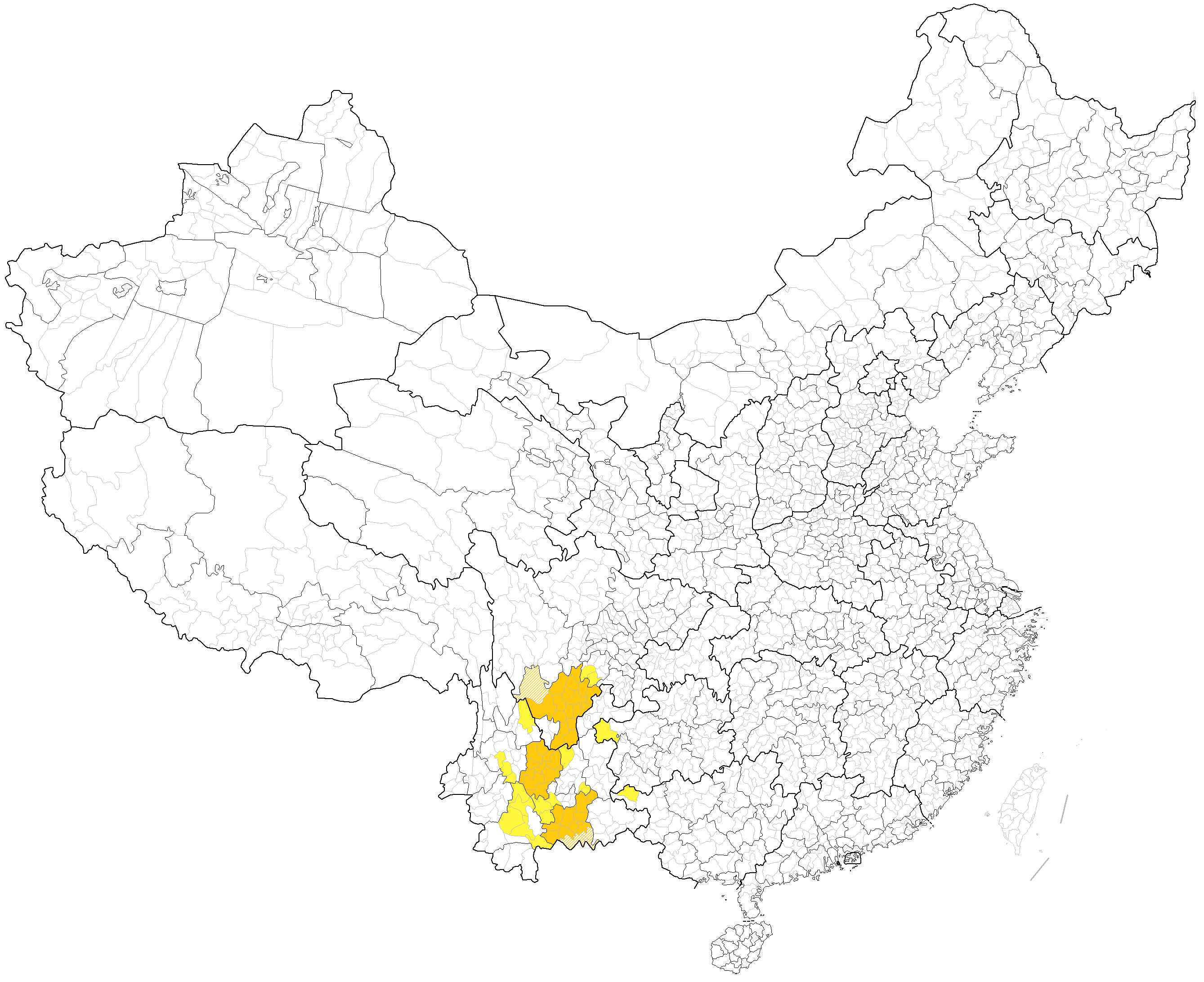
Map of the Yi (0.70%).

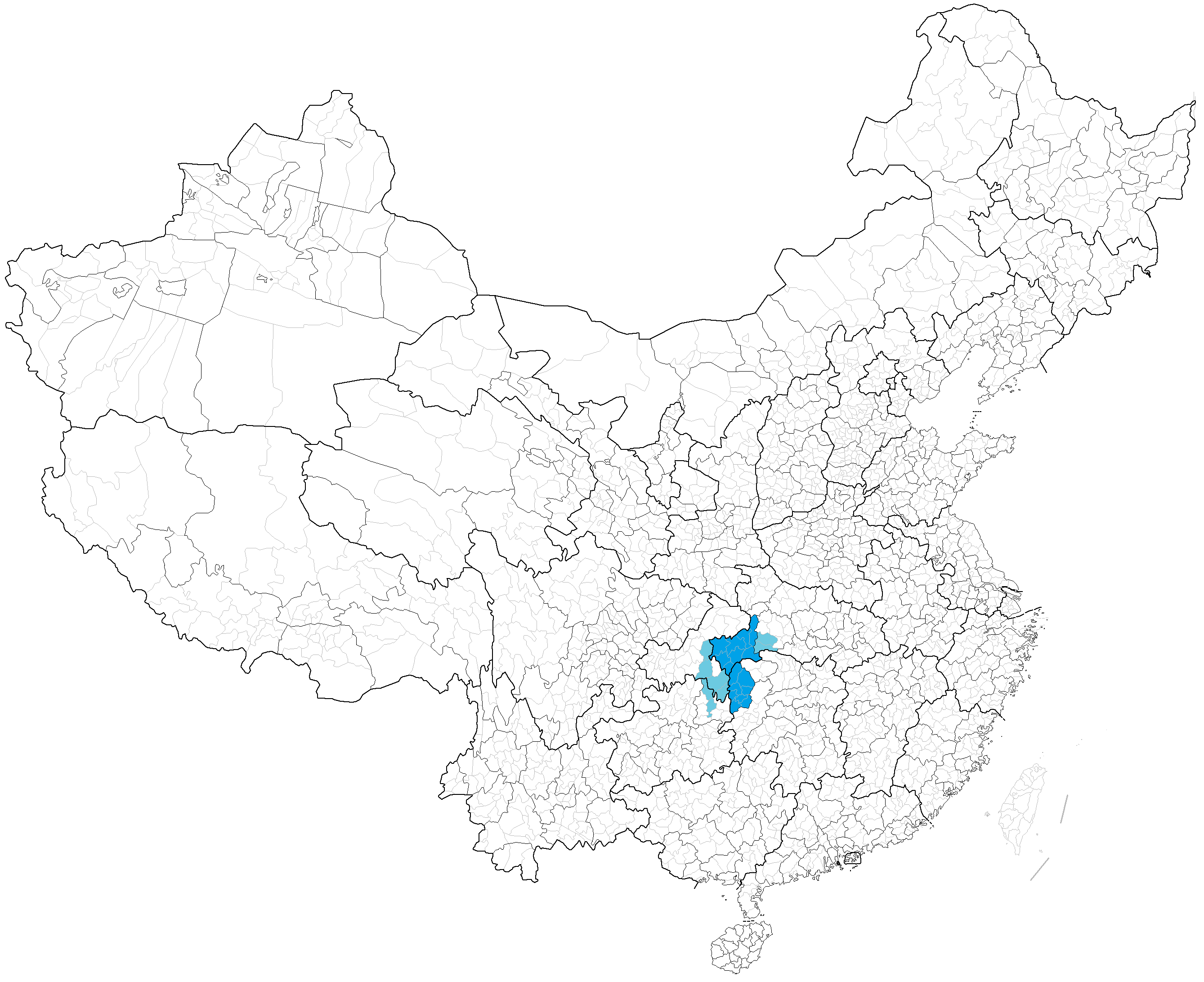
Map of the Tujia (0.68%).

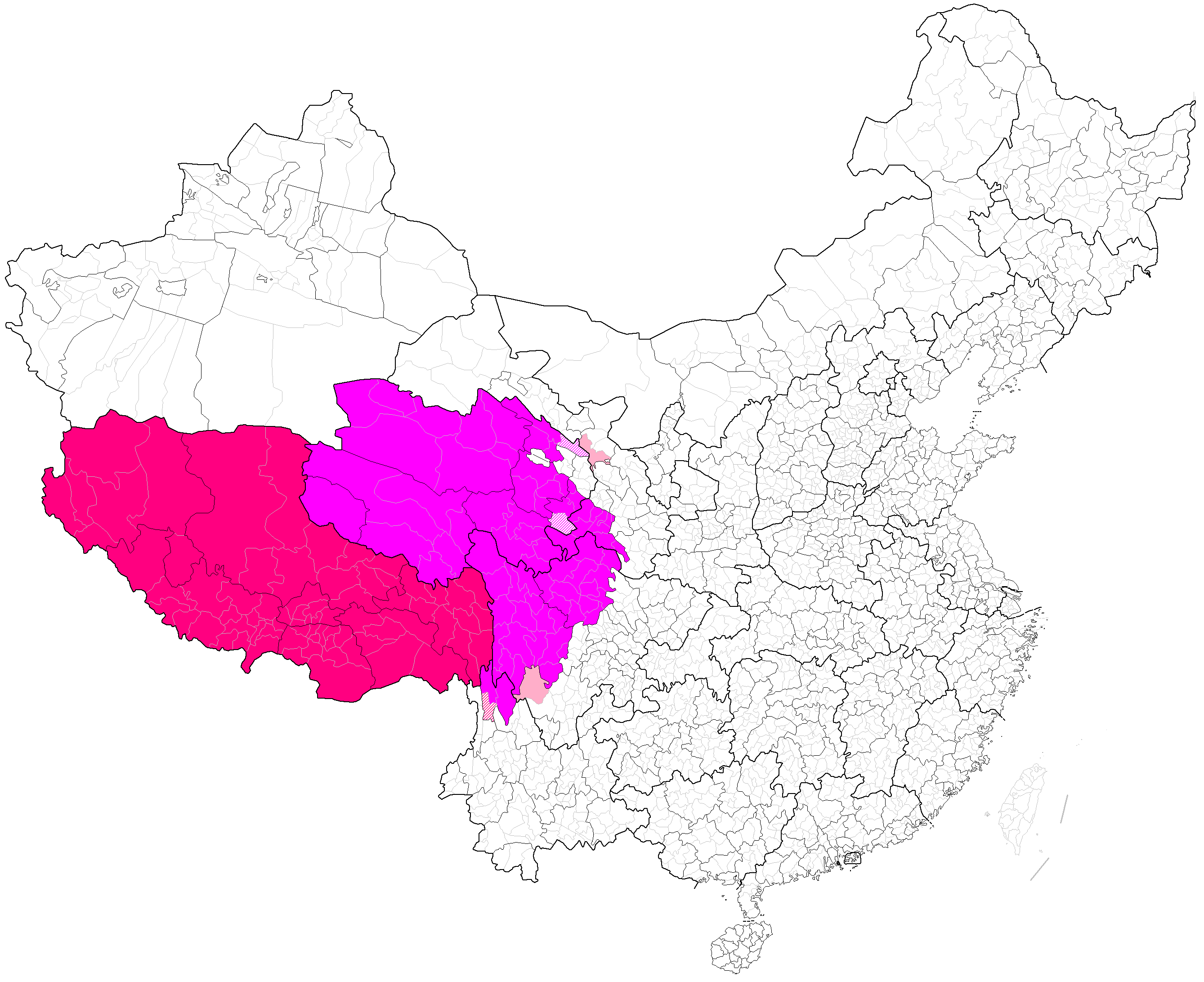
Map of the Tibetans (0.50%), natives of Greater Tibet.

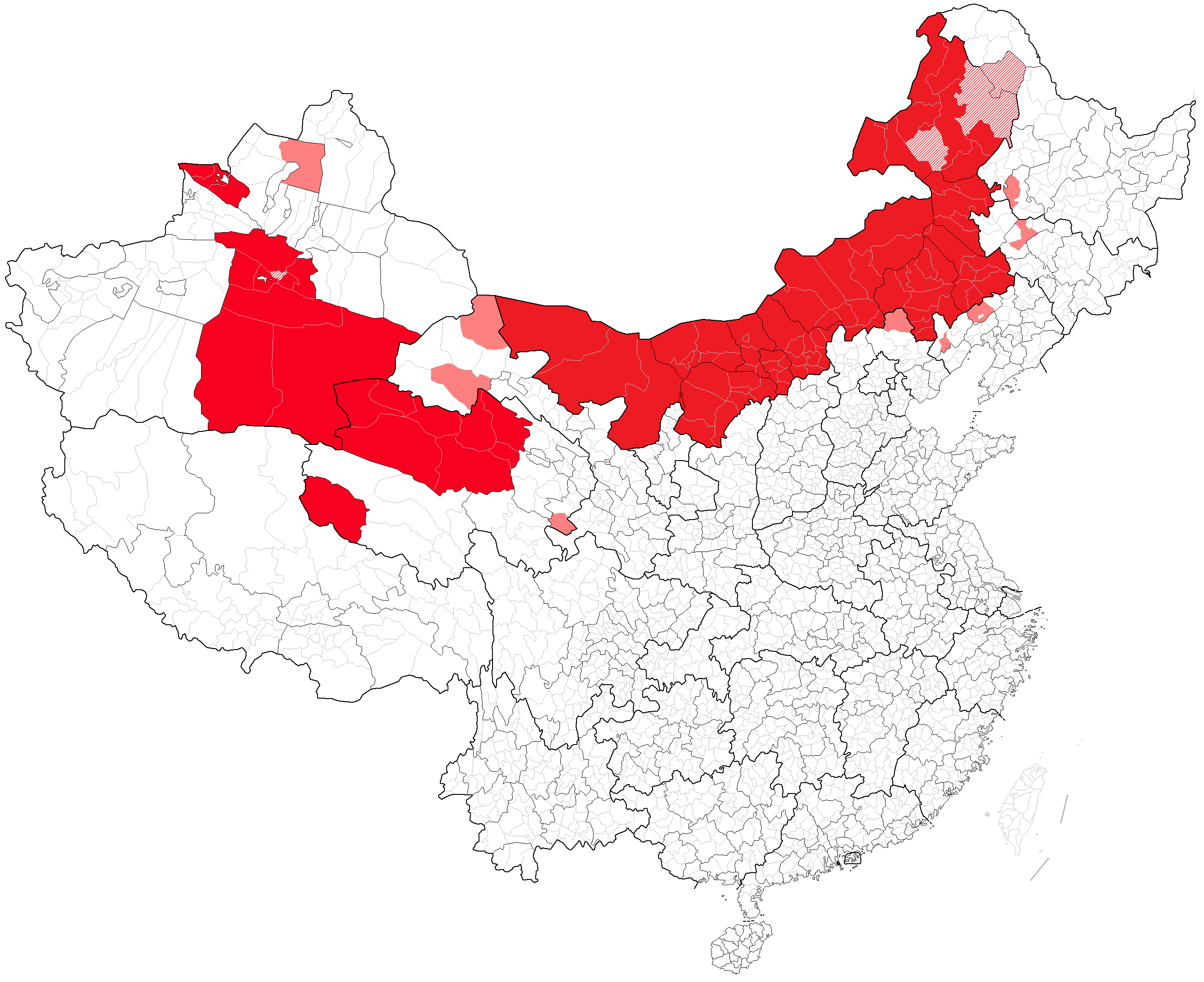
Map of the Mongols (0.45%), natives of Inner Mongolia.

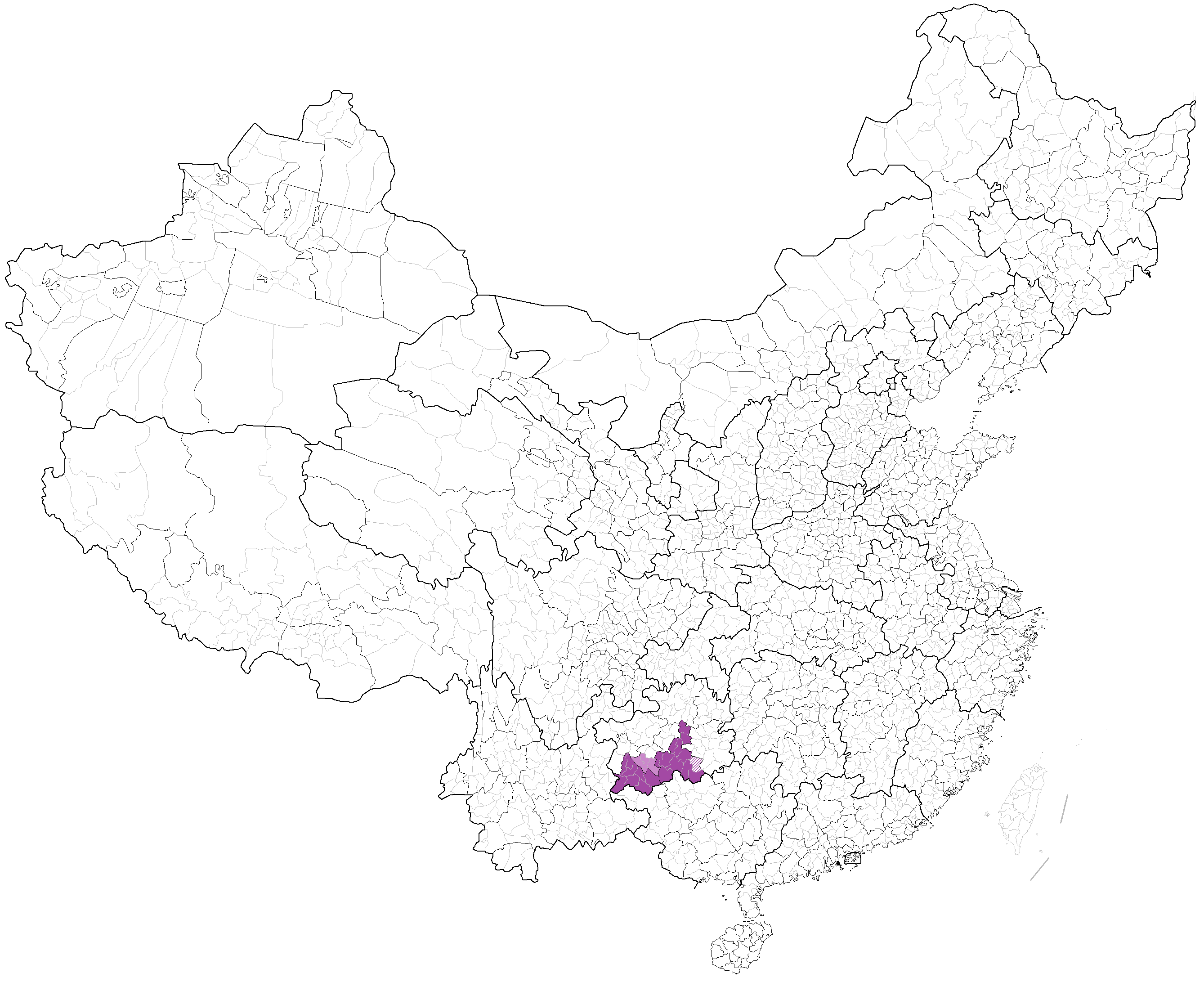
Map of the Bouyei (0.25%).

=== People from other immigration jurisdictions ===
The 2020 Census counted 371,380 residents from Hong Kong, 55,732 residents from Macau, 157,886 residents from Taiwan, and 845,697 residents from other locations, totaling 1,430,695 residents.

Nationality	Residents
Myanmar	351,248
Vietnam	79,212
South Korea	59,242
United States	55,226
Japan	36,838
Canada	21,309
Australia	13,777
Russia	12,513
United Kingdom	11,236
Nigeria	10,654
Other countries	234,600
TOTAL	845,697

== Religions ==
Religions in each province, major city and autonomous region of China, according to the latest available data (Note: The statistics for Chinese ancestorism, that is the worship of ancestor-gods within the lineage system, are from the Chinese Spiritual Life Survey of 2010. The statistics for Buddhism and Christianity are from the China Family Panel Studies survey of 2012. The statistics for Islam are from a survey conducted in 2010. It is worthwhile to note that the populations of Chinese ancestorism and Buddhism may overlap, even with the large remaining parts of the population whose belief is not documented in the table. The latter, the uncharted population, may practise other forms of Chinese religion, such as the worship of gods, Taoism, Confucianism and folk salvationisms, or may be atheist. Indeed, according to the CFPS 2012, only 6.3% of the Chinese were irreligious in the sense of "atheism", while the rest practised the worship of gods and ancestors.)
Province	Chinese Folk Religion	Buddhism	Christianity	Islam
Fujian	31.31%	40.40%	3.97%	0.32%
Zhejiang	23.02%	23.99%	3.89%	<0.2%
Qinghai	—N/a	—N/a	0.76%	17.51%
Guangdong	43.71%	5.18%	0.68%	<0.2%
Yunnan	32.22%	13.06%	0.68%	1.52%
Guizhou	31.18%	1.86%	0.49%	0.48%
Jiangsu	16.67%	14.17%	2.67%	<0.2%
Jiangxi	24.05%	7.96%	0.66%	<0.2%
Shandong	25.28%	2.90%	1.54%	0.55%
Chongqing	26.63%	0.85%	0.28%	<0.2%
Hunan	20.19%	2.44%	0.49%	<0.2%
Shanxi	15.61%	3.65%	1.55%	<0.2%
Henan	7.94%	5.52%	4.95%	1.05%
Jilin	7.73%	8.23%	3.26%	<0.2%
Anhui	4.64%	7.83%	4.32%	0.58%
Gansu	3.51%	6.85%	0.28%	6.64%
Heilongjiang	7.73%	4.39%	3.63%	0.35%
Shaanxi	7.58%	6.35%	1.66%	0.4%
Liaoning	7.73%	5.31%	1.99%	0.64%
Sichuan	10.6%	2.06%	0.30%	<0.2%
Hubei	6.5%	2.09%	1.71%	<0.2%
Hebei	5.52%	1.59%	1.13%	0.82%
Hainan	—N/a	—N/a	0.48%	<0.2%
Beijing	—N/a	11.2%	0.78%	1.76%
Shanghai	—N/a	10.30%	1.88%	0.36%
Tianjin	—N/a	—N/a	0.43%	<0.2%
Tibet	—N/a	~78%	—N/a	0.39%
Xinjiang	—N/a	—N/a	1.0%	57.99%
Guangxi	40.48%	10.23%	0.15%	<0.2%
Ningxia	—N/a	—N/a	1.17%	33.99%
Inner Mongolia	2.36%	12.1%	2.0%	0.91%
China	16%	15%	2.5%	2%

Mapping of religions in China and Taiwan

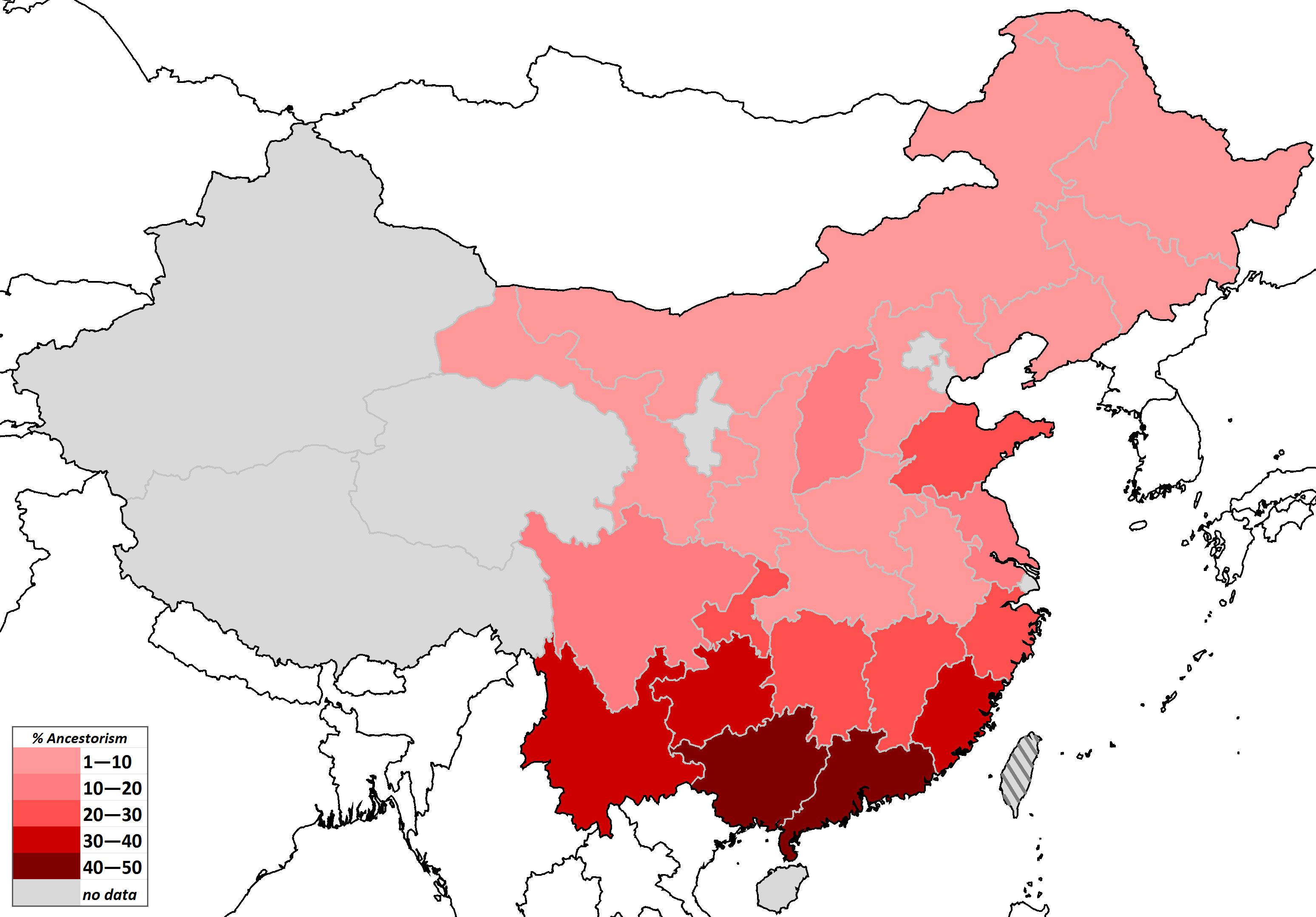
Chinese ancestorism (Note: Chinese ancestral or lineage religion is the worship of kin's ancestor-gods in the system of lineage churches and ancestral shrines. It is worthwhile to note that this does not include other forms of Chinese religion, such as the worship of national ancestral gods or the gods of nature (which in northern China is more common than ancestor worship), and Taoism and Confucianism.)

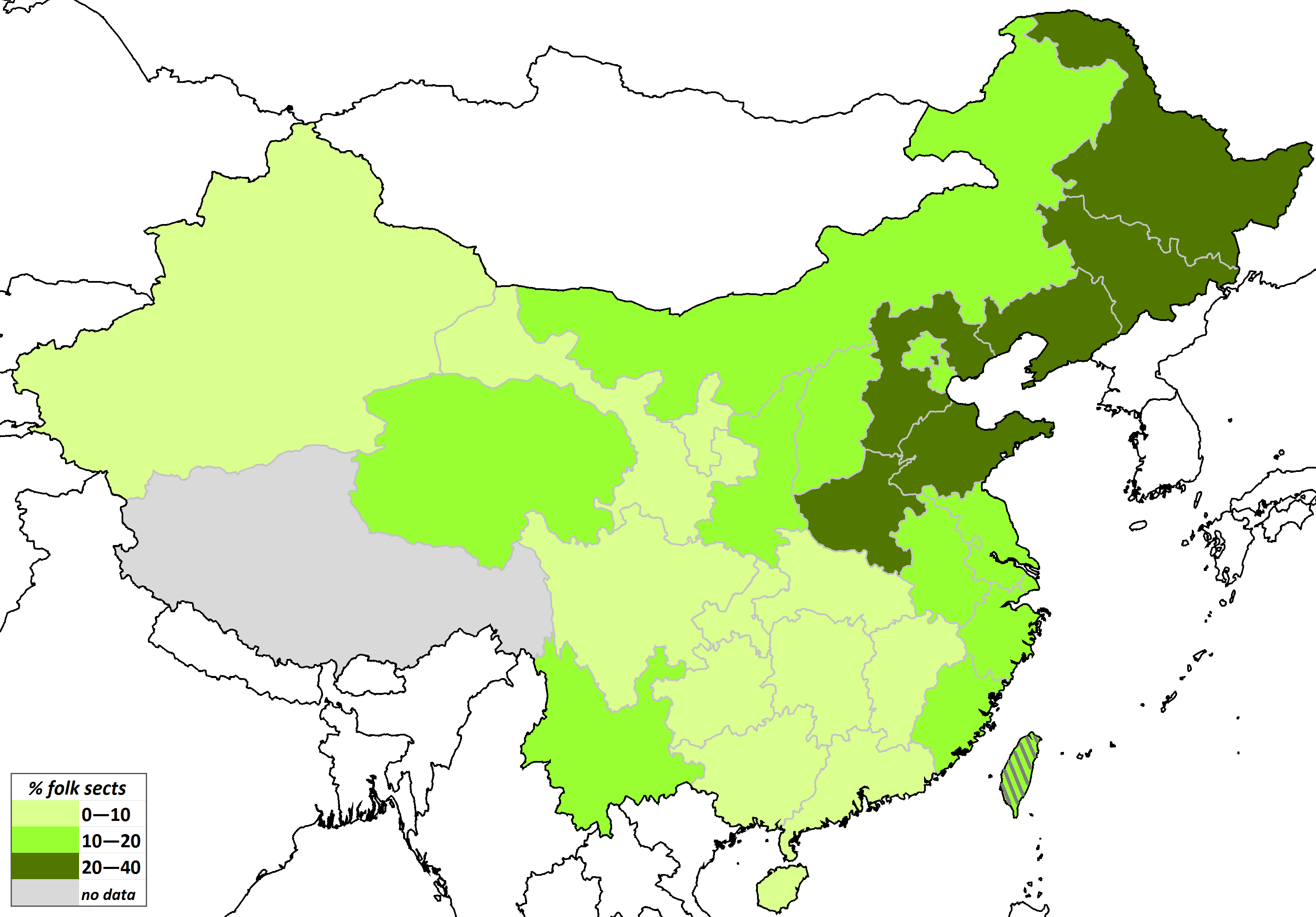
Chinese salvationist religions, Confucian churches and jiaohua movements (Note: The map represents the geographic diffusion of the tradition of folk religious movements of salvation, Confucian churches and jiaohua ("transformative teachings") movements, based on historical data and contemporary fieldwork. Due to incomplete data and ambiguous identity of many of these traditions the map may not be completely accurate. Sources include a World Religion Map from Harvard University, based on data from the World Religion Database, showing highly unprecise ranges of Chinese folk (salvationist) religions' membership by province. Another source, the studies of China's Regional Religious System, find "very high activity of popular religion and secret societies and low Buddhist presence in northern regions, while very high Buddhist presence in the southeast". (Note: Historical record and contemporary scholarly fieldwork testify certain central and northern provinces of China as hotbeds of folk religious sects and Confucian religious groups.): Hebei: Fieldwork by Thomas David Dubois testifies the dominance of folk religious movements, specifically the Church of the Heaven and the Earth and the Church of the Highest Supreme, since their "energetic revival since the 1970s" (p. 13), in the religious life of the counties of Hebei. Religious life in rural Hebei is also characterised by a type of organisation called the benevolent churches and the salvationist movement known as Zailiism has returned active since the 1990s.; Henan: According to Heberer and Jakobi (2000) Henan has been for centuries a hub of folk religious sects (p. 7) that constitute significant focuses of the religious life of the province. Sects present in the region include the Baguadao or Tianli ("Order of Heaven") sect, the Dadaohui, the Tianxianmiaodao, the Yiguandao, and many others. Henan also has a strong popular Confucian orientation (p. 5).; Northeast China: According to official records by the then-government, the Universal Church of the Way and its Virtue or Morality Society had 8 million members in Manchuria, or northeast China in the 1930s, making up about 25% of the total population of the area (note that the state of Manchuria also included the eastern end of modern-day Inner Mongolia). Folk religious movements of a Confucian nature, or Confucian churches, were in fact very successful in the northeast.; Shandong: The province is traditionally a stronghold of Confucianism and is the area of origin of many folk religious sects and Confucian churches of the modern period, including the Universal Church of the Way and its Virtue, the Way of the Return to the One (皈依道 Guīyīdào), the Way of Unity (一貫道 Yīguàndào), and others. Alex Payette (2016) testifies the rapid growth of Confucian groups in the province in the 2010s.; According to the Chinese General Social Survey of 2012, about 2.2% of the total population of China (around 30 million people) claims membership in the folk religious sects, which have likely maintained their historical dominance in central-northern and northeastern China.)

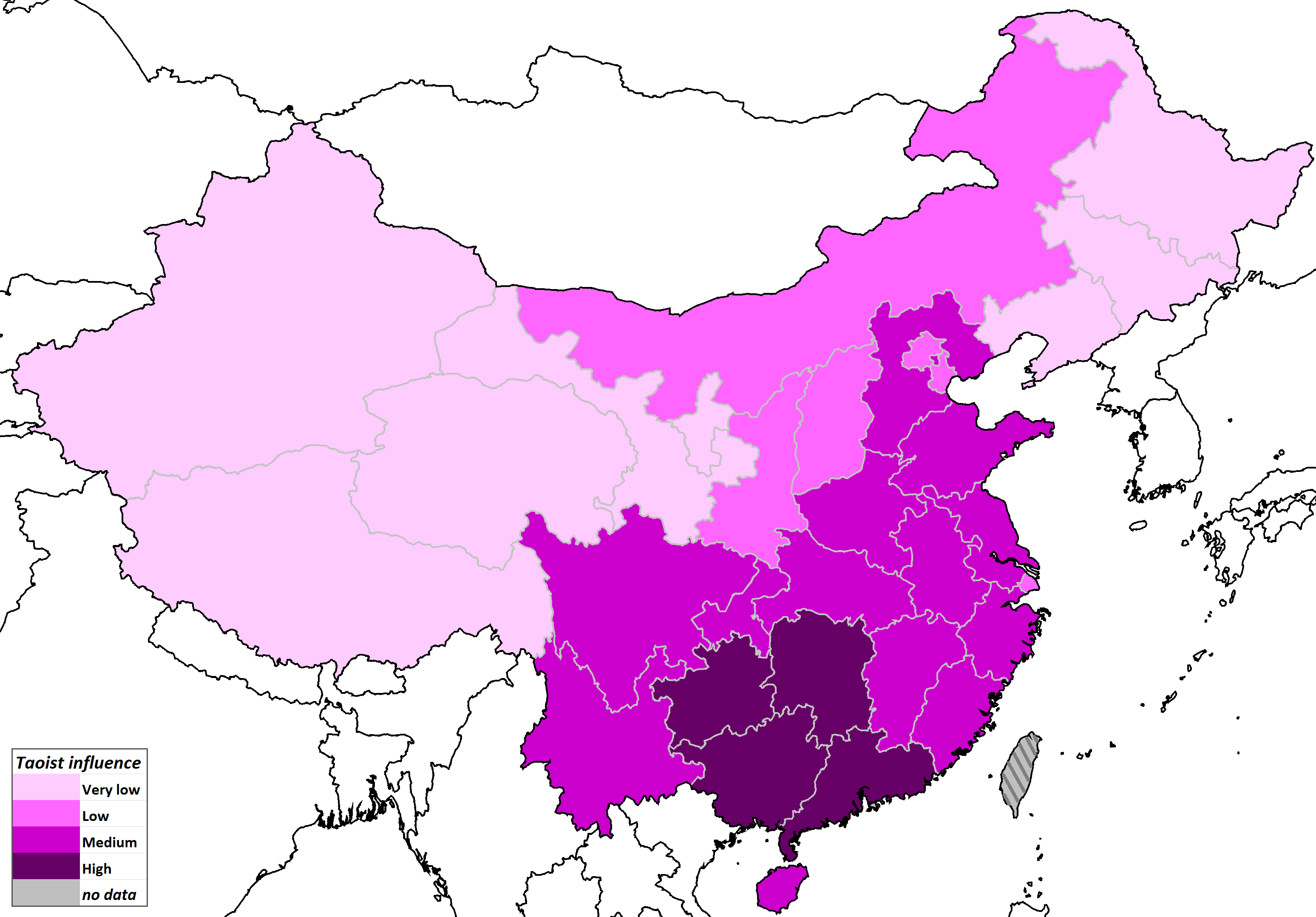
Taoism

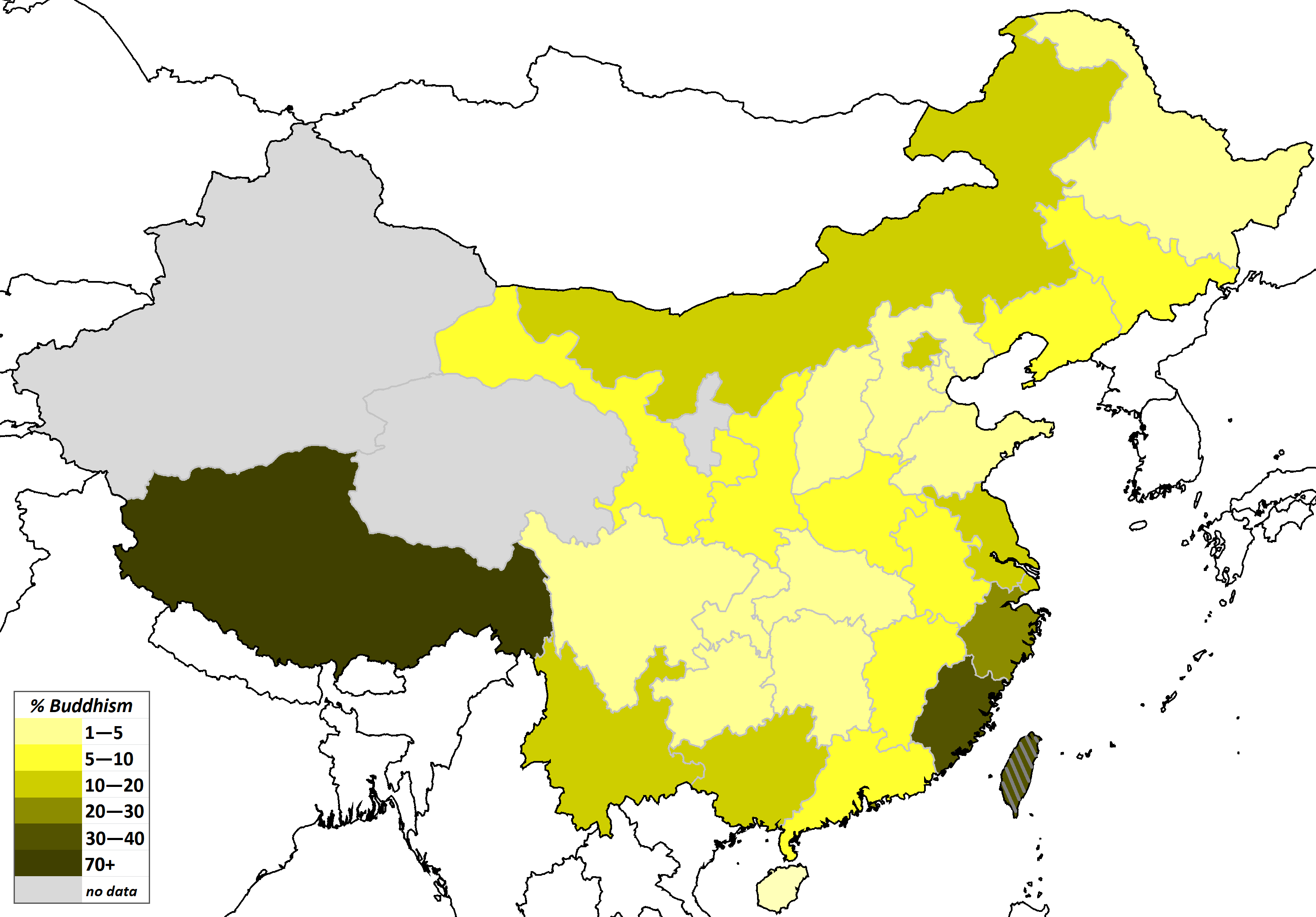
Buddhism

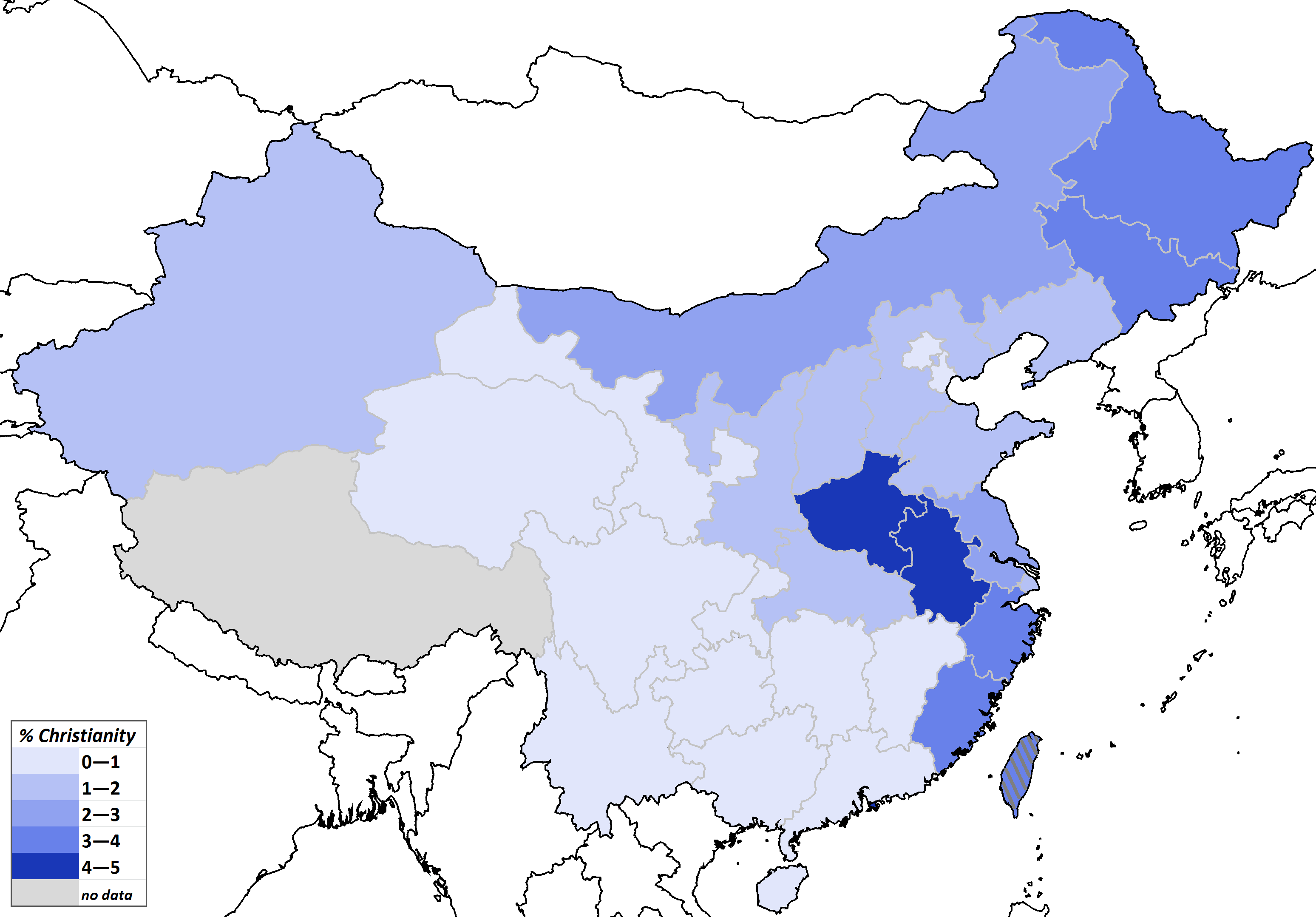
Christianity

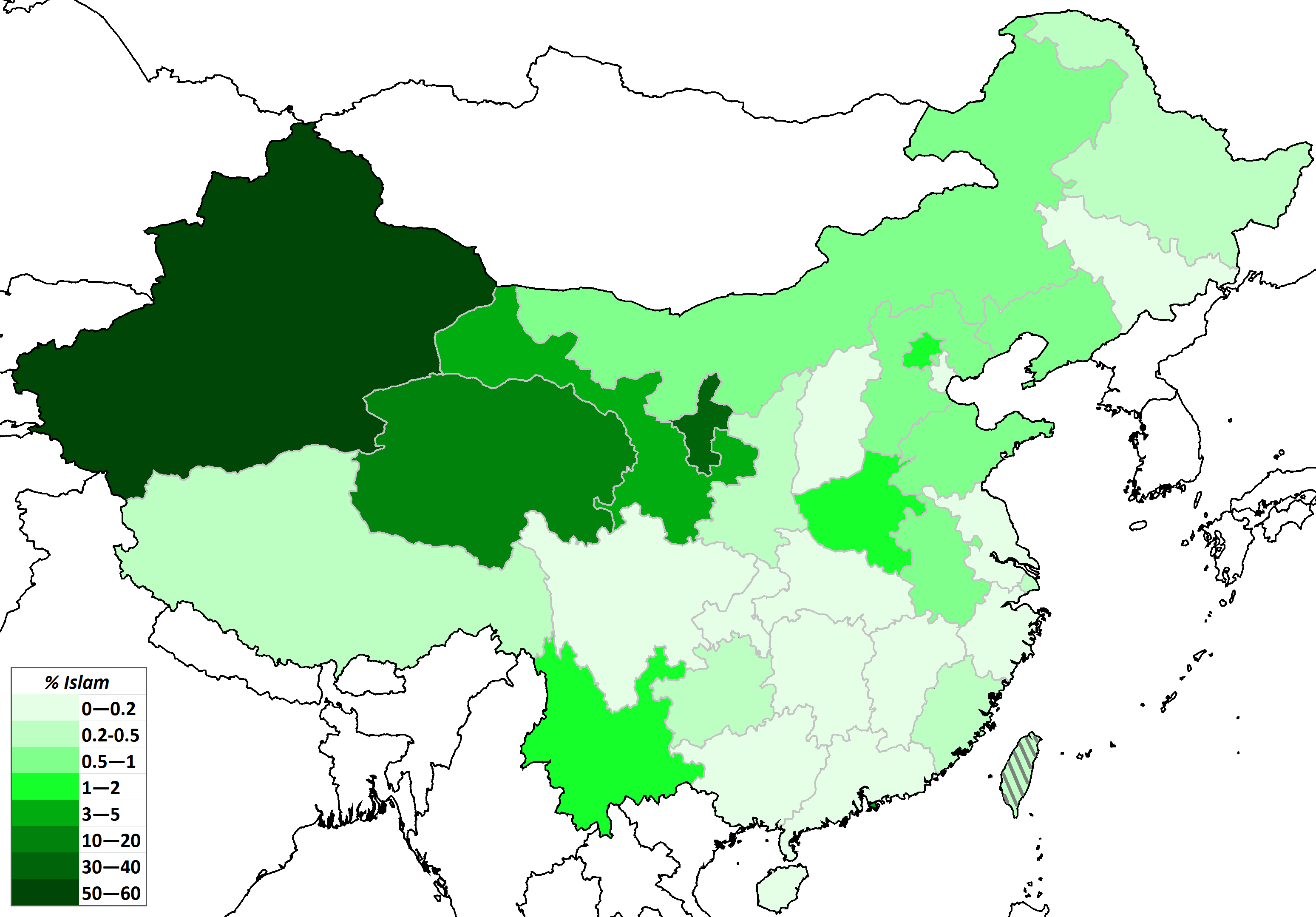
Islam

Distribution of religious beliefs

Religions in five Chinese cities (Note: Beijing, Shanghai, Nantong, Wuhan, Baoding.), Yao X. 2005
Religion or belief	%
Cults of gods and ancestors	23.8%
Buddhism or worship of Buddha	23.1%
Believe in fate and divination	38.5%
Believe in feng shui	27.1%
Believe in celestial powers	26.7%
Are not members of religions	51.8%
Are members of religions	5.3%
Are convinced atheists	32.9%

Religions in China, Horizon
Religion	2005	2006	2007
Buddhism	11%	16%	12%
Taoism	<1%	<1%	<1%
Islam	1.2%	0.7%	2.9%
Christianity	4%	1%	2%
—Catholicism	2%	<1%	1%
—Protestantism	2%	1%	1%
Other religion	0.3%	0.1%	0.1%
None	77%	77%	81%
Refused to answer	7%	5%	5%

Religions in China, CSLS 2010
Religion	Number	%
Cults of gods and ancestors	754 million	56.2% (Note: Although a lower 215 million, or 16% said they "believed in the existence" of ancestral spirits.)
Buddhism	185 million	13.8%
Buddhist initiates	17,3 million	1.3%
Taoist folk religions	173 million	12.9%
Taoism	12 million	0.9%
Christianity	33 million	2.4%
—Protestantism	30 million	2.2%
—Catholicism	3 million	0.2%
Islam	23 million	1.7%

Religions in China, CGSS
Religion	2006	2008	2010	2011	Average
Buddhism	7.4%	7.0%	5.5%	5.0%	6.2%
Taoism	0.2%	0.2%	0.2%	0.2%	0.2%
Folk religious sects	2.7%	0.3%	2.9%	1.9%	2.2%
Islam	1.2%	0.7%	2.9%	1.1%	1.7%
Christianity	2.1%	2.2%	2.1%	2.6%	2.3%
—Catholicism	0.3%	0.1%	0.2%	0.4%	0.3%
—Protestantism	1.8%	2.1%	1.9%	2.2%	2.0%
Other religion	0.3%	0.1%	0.1%	0.3%	0.2%
Traditional worship or "not religious"	86.1%	89.5%	86.3%	88.9%	87.2%

Demographic, political and socioeconomic characteristics of religious believers in six provinces, (Note: The populations surveyed were those of the provinces of Jiangsu, Sichuan, Shaanxi, Jilin, Hebei and Fujian.) Yu Tao—CCAP (Note: Center for Chinese Agricultural Policy)—PU 2008
Religious community	% of population	% male	Average age in years	% agricultural households	% ethnic minority	% married	% Communist Party members	Average education in years	Annual family income in yuan
Traditional folk religion	31.09	64.8	46.46	96.4	1.1	94.6	9.8	5.94	29.772
Buddhism	10.85	54.4	49.44	95.8	0.0	92.1	9.8	5.88	38.911
Protestantism	3.54	47.7	49.66	89.2	4.6	96.9	4.6	5.83	24.168
Taoism	0.71	64.3	50.50	92.9	0.0	100	21.4	6.29	30.630
Catholicism	0.39	66.7	46.33	91.7	8.3	91.7	8.3	7.50	46.010
All religious	46.59	61.6	49.45	96.2	1.2	93.8	9.6	5.94	30.816
All non-religious	53.41	64.6	50.62	96.3	5.5	93.3	15.0	6.40	26.448

Religions by age group, CFPS 2012
Religion	<30	30–40	40–50	50–60	60+
Buddhism	6.6%	7.9%	5.8%	6.0%	6.0%
Taoism	0.3%	0.4%	0.2%	0.4%	0.4%
Islam	0.3%	0.8%	0.5%	0.8%	0.4%
Christianity	1.5%	1.2%	2.5%	2.3%	2.9%
—Catholicism	0.3%	0.1%	0.6%	0.3%	0.3%
—Protestantism	1.2%	1.1%	1.9%	2.0%	2.6%
Other religion	0.2%	0.5%	0.7%	0.4%	0.7%
Traditional worship or "not religious"	91.0%	89.1%	90.3%	90.2%	89.6%

Religious self-identification of university students in Beijing (2011)
1. Not religious or other (80.3%)
2. Buddhism (7.00%)
3. Confucianism (4.00%)
4. Christianity (3.90%)
5. Taoism (2.70%)
6. Islam (2.10%)
Religious self-identification of participants of the cultural nationalist movement in the mainland (2011)
1. Confucianism (59.6%)
2. Buddhism (26.3%)
3. Taoism (4.10%)
4. Christianity (Note: Mostly Catholicism (0.6%), while nobody declared affiliation with Protestantism (0%).) (0.60%)
5. Don't know (9.40%)

== Migration ==
China's immigration policy, governed by the 2012 Exit-Entry Law, focuses on strict, merit-based, and security-driven controls, actively discouraging low-skilled immigration while restricting long-term permanent residency for most foreigners. In 2004, a system was introduced allowing immigrants to obtain permanent residence; however, its implementation has been carried out on a case-by-case basis. Between 2004 and 2023, approximately 12,000 individuals were granted this status. Naturalization rates have been even lower.

Internal migration in the People's Republic of China is one of the most extensive in the world according to the International Labour Organization. In fact, research done by Kam Wing Chan of the University of Washington suggests that "In the 30 years since 1979, China's urban population has grown by about 440 million to 622 million in 2009. Of the 440 million increase, about 340 million was attributable to net migration and urban reclassification. Even if only half of that increase was migration, the volume of rural-urban migration in such a short period is likely the largest in human history." Migrants in China are commonly members of a floating population, which refers primarily to migrants in China without local household registration status through the Chinese Hukou system. In general, rural-urban migrant workers are most excluded from local educational resources, citywide social welfare programs and many jobs because of their lack of hukou status.

In 2011 a total of 252.78 million migrant workers (an increase of 4.4% compared to 2010) existed in China. Out of these, migrant workers who left their hometown and worked in other provinces accounted for 158.63 million (an increase of 3.4% compared to 2010) and migrant workers who worked within their home provinces reached 94.15 million (an increase of 5.9% compared to 2010). Estimations are that Chinese cities will face an influx of another 243 million migrants by 2025, taking the urban population up to nearly 1 billion people. This population of migrants would represent "almost 40 percent of the total urban population," a number which is almost three times the current level. While it is often difficult to collect accurate statistical data on migrant floating populations, the number of migrants is undoubtedly quite large. "In China's largest cities, for instance, it is often quoted that at least one out of every five persons is a migrant." China's government influences the pattern of urbanization through the Hukou permanent residence registration system, land-sale policies, infrastructure investment and the incentives offered to local government officials. The other factors influencing migration of people from rural provincial areas to large cities are employment, education, business opportunities and higher standard of living.

The mass emigration known as the Chinese diaspora, which occurred from the 19th century to 1949, was mainly caused by wars and starvation in mainland China, invasion from various foreign countries, as well as the problems resulting from political corruption. Most immigrants were illiterate peasants and manual labourers, called "coolies" by analogy to the same pattern of immigration from India, who emigrated to work in countries such as the Americas, Australia, South Africa and Southeast Asia.

== See also ==
- Language Atlas of China
- List of cities in China by population
- Megalopolises in China
- Population history of China
