= Population history of China =

The population history of China covers the long-term pattern of population growth in China and its impact on the history of China. The population went through many cycles that generally reached peaks along each imperial power and was reduced due to wars and barbarian invasions. The census data shows that the population as percentage share of the world has a long-term average of 26%, with 6% standard deviation. The minimum could be as low as 16% while the maximum as high as 38%. In the late 19th century and the early 20th century, the percentage share has been trending down. This was caused by two opposite factors: On one hand, the world population has been growing explosively. On the other hand, in order to address the poverty issue, China implemented a strict birth control policy. For recent trends see demographics of China and China.

== Census data ==
| Period | Year | Census households | Census population | Modern estimates | Share of world population |
|---|---|---|---|---|---|
| Warring States | −423 | | | 43,740,000 | 27% |
| Western Han | −200 | | | 42,000,000 | 28% |
| Western Han | 1 | 12,366,470 | 59,594,979 | 65,000,000 | 27% |
| Eastern Han | 156 | 16,070,906 | 56,486,856 | 65,000,000 | 27% |
| Eastern Han | 200 | | | 60,800,000 | 25% |
| Western Jin | 280 | 6,801,000 | 8,200,000 | 37,986,000 | 17% |
| Western Jin | 300 | | | 35,000,000 | 17% |
| Sixteen Kingdoms | 400 | | | 51,300,000 | 22% |
| Northern and Southern dynasties | 500 | | | 51,300,000 | 22% |
| Sui | 606 | 8,700,000 | 46,019,956 | 46,000,000 | 19% |
| Tang | 705 | 6,156,141 | 37,140,000 | 48,300,000 | 19% |
| Tang | 755 | 8,914,709 | 52,919,309 | 53,000,000-90,000,000 | 23%-34.6% |
| Tang | 800 | | | 50,600,000 | 18% |
| Tang | 900 | | | 39,000,000 | 16% |
| Northern Song | 1014 | 9,055,729 | 21,996,965 | 54,300,000 | 23% |
| Northern Song | 1103 | 20,524,065 | 45,981,845 | 100,000,000-123,100,000 | 31.25-36% |
| Southern Song and Jin | 1200 | 19,526,273 | 76,335,485 | 122,300,000 | 33% |
| Yuan | 1290 | 13,196,206 | 58,834,711 | 75,306,000 | 17% |
| Yuan | 1351 | 27,650,000 | 87,587,000 | 120,359,000 | 31% |
| Ming | 1393 | 10,699,399 | 60,545,813 | 65,000,000 | 19% |
| Ming | 1400 | 11,415,829 | 66,598,339 | 81,000,000 | 23% |
| Ming | 1500 | 10,508,935 | 60,105,835 | 110,000,000 | 26% |
| Ming | 1550 | 10,621,436 | 60,692,856 | 145,000,000 | 26% |
| Ming | 1600 | | | 160,000,000 | 26.67% |
| Qing | 1650 | | 123,000,000 | 140,000,000 | 21.54% |
| Qing | 1700 | | 126,110,000 | 160,000,000 | 22.86% |
| Qing | 1750 | | 177,495,000 | 225,000,000 | 25.85% |
| Qing | 1791 | | 303,000,000 | 303,000,000 | 31.8% |
| Qing | 1821 | | 355,540,000 | 383,712,000 | 37% |
| Qing | 1851 | | 431,896,000 | 408,359,000-436,000,000 | 32.5-35% |
| Republic of China | 1931 | | 474,780,000 | 474,780,000 | 24% |
| People's Republic of China | 1950 | | 546,815,000 | 552,000,000 | 22% |
| People's Republic of China | 1953 | | 582,603,417 | 582,603,417 | 21.9% |
| People's Republic of China | 1964 | | 694,581,759 | 694,581,759 | 21.3% |
| People's Republic of China | 1975 | | 916,395,000 | 920,940,000 | 23% |
| People's Republic of China | 1982 | | 1,008,180,000 | 1,022,250,000 | 22% |
| People's Republic of China | 1990 | | 1,133,682,501 | 1,133,682,501 | 21.3% |
| People's Republic of China | 2000 | | 1,262,645,000 | 1,283,190,000 | 21% |
| People's Republic of China | 2005 | | 1,303,720,000 | 1,321,620,000 | 20% |
| People's Republic of China | 2010 | | 1,337,825,000 | 1,359,760,000 | 20% |
| People's Republic of China | 2015 | | 1,374,620,000 | 1,397,030,000 | 19% |
| People's Republic of China | 2020 | | 1,411,778,724 | 1,447,084,648 | 17.8% |
| People's Republic of China | 2025 | | 1,404,890,000 | 1,416,100,000 | 17.2% |

== Han, 202 BC – 220 AD ==
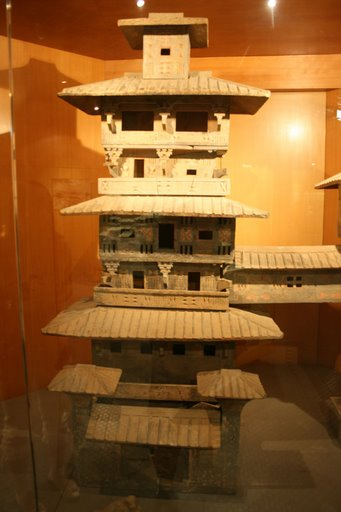
A painted ceramic architectural model—found in a Han tomb—depicting an urban residential tower with verandas, tiled rooftops, dougong support brackets, and a covered bridge extending from the third floor to another tower

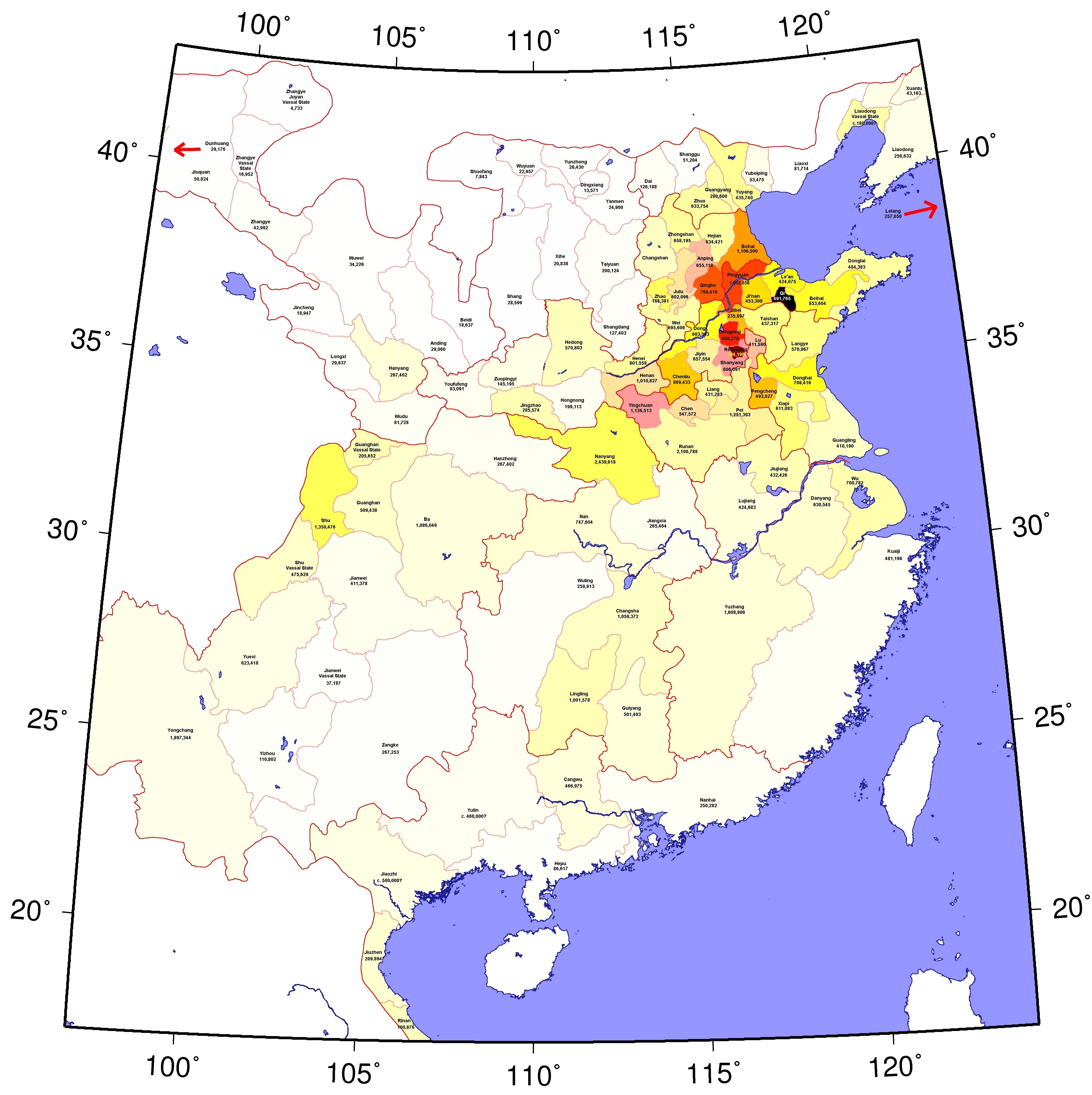
A map of Han China's population density in 2 AD, based on a national census. Most of China's population was concentrated in north-central China back then.

During the Warring States period (475–221 BC), the development of private commerce, new trade routes, handicraft industries, and a money economy led to the growth of new urban centers. These centers were markedly different from the older cities, which had merely served as power bases for the nobility. The use of a standardized, nationwide currency during the Qin dynasty (221–206 BC) facilitated long-distance trade between cities. Many Han cities grew large: the Western Han capital, Chang'an, had approximately 250,000 inhabitants, while the Eastern Han capital, Luoyang, had approximately 500,000 inhabitants. The population of the Han Empire, recorded in the tax census of 156 AD, was 50.6 million people in 12,366,470 households. The majority of commoners who populated the cities lived in extended urban and suburban areas outside the city walls and gatehouses.

== Trends: Tang to Southern Song ==
Demographic historian Angus Maddison uses extensive data to argue that the main base of the Chinese economy shifted southwards between about 750 AD and 1250 AD. In 750 three-quarters of the population lived in the rural north, growing wheat and millet. By about 1250 three-quarters lived south of the Yangtze and grew mainly rice. By 1000 AD per capita income in China was higher than the Europe average at the same time. Divergence took place in the fifteenth and eighteenth centuries as the European economy grew faster. From 1250 to 1900 China saw a fourfold increase in population whilst maintaining an average per capita income more or less stable. The main explanations were peace, irrigation, and fast-ripening seeds that permitted two crops a year. Chinese total GDP grew faster than that of Western Europe from 1700 to 1820, even though European per capita income grew faster.

== Ming, 1368 – 1644 ==
Sinologist historians debate the population figures for each era in the Ming dynasty. The historian Timothy Brook notes that the Ming government census figures are dubious since fiscal obligations prompted many families to underreport the number of people in their households and many county officials to underreport the number of households in their jurisdiction. Children were often underreported, especially female children, as shown by skewed population statistics throughout the Ming. Even adult women were underreported; for example, the Daming Prefecture in North Zhili reported a population of 378,167 males and 226,982 females in 1502. The government attempted to revise the census figures using estimates of the expected average number of people in each household, but this did not solve the widespread problem of tax registration. Some part of the gender imbalance may be attributed to the practice of female infanticide. The practice is well documented in China, going back over two thousand years, and it was described as "rampant" and "practiced by almost every family" by contemporary authors. However, the dramatically skewed sex ratios, which many counties reported exceeding 2:1 by 1586, cannot likely be explained by infanticide alone.

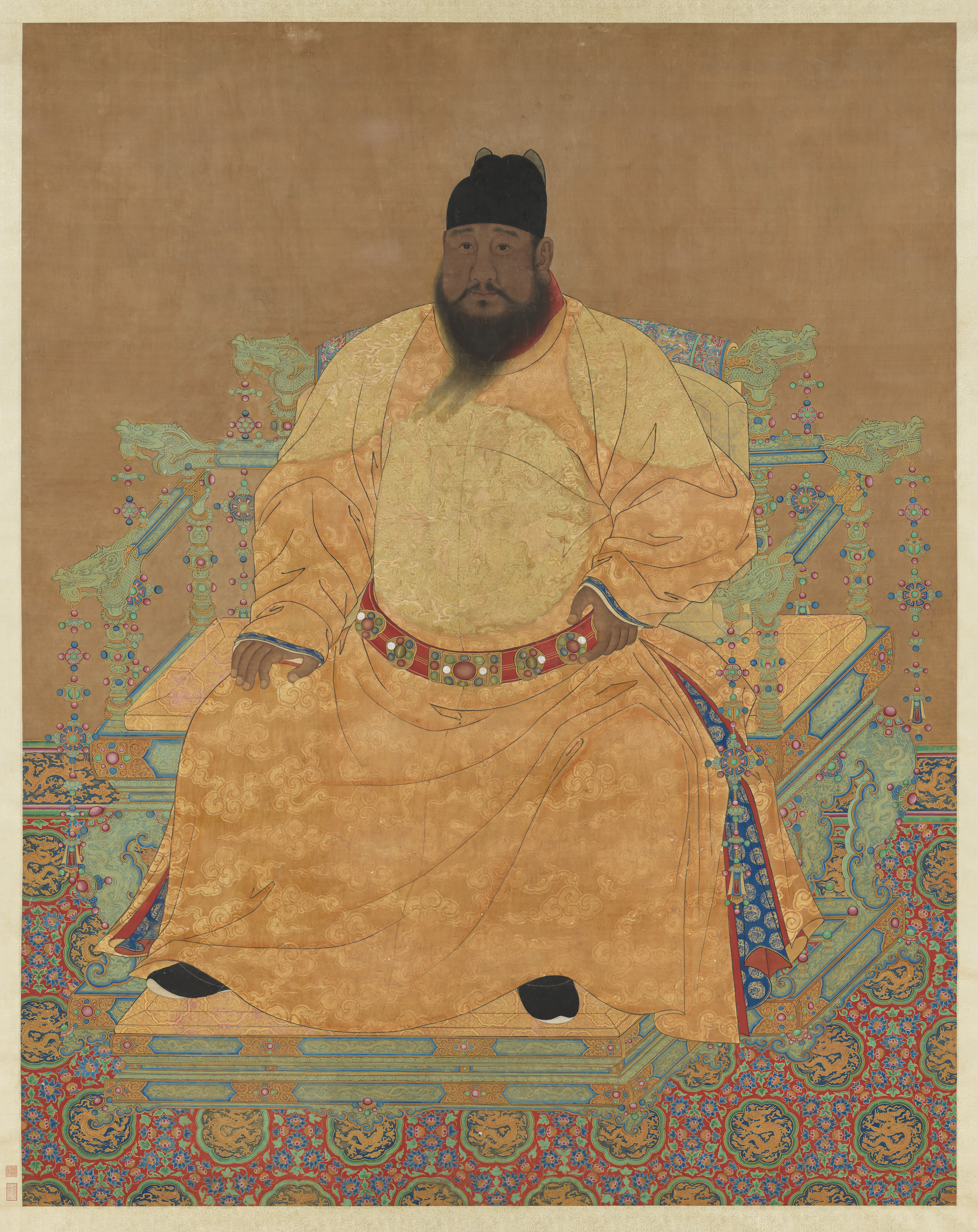
The Xuande Emperor (r. 1425–35); he mistakenly stated in 1428 that his populace was dwindling due to palace construction and military adventures. But the population was rising under him, a fact noted in a 1432 report.

The number of people counted in the census of 1381 was 59,873,305; however, this number dropped significantly when the government found that some 3 million people were missing from the tax census of 1391. Even though underreporting figures was made a capital crime in 1381, the need for survival pushed many to abandon the tax registration and wander from their region, where Hongwu had attempted to impose rigid immobility on the populace. The government tried to mitigate this by creating their own conservative estimate of 60,545,812 people in 1393. In his Studies on the Population of China, Ho Ping-ti suggests revising the 1393 census to 65 million people, noting that large areas of North China and frontier areas were not counted in that census. Brook states that the population figures gathered in the official censuses after 1393 ranged between 51 and 62 million, while the population was in fact increasing. Even the Hongzhi Emperor (r. 1487–1505) remarked that the daily increase in subjects coincided with the daily dwindling number of registered civilians and soldiers. William Atwell states that around 1400 the population of China was perhaps 90 million people, citing Heijdra and Mote.

Historians are now turning to local gazetteers of Ming China for clues that would show consistent growth in population. Using the gazetteers, Brook estimates that the overall population under the Chenghua Emperor (r. 1464–87) was roughly 75 million, despite mid-Ming census figures hovering around 62 million. While prefectures across the empire in the mid-Ming period were reporting either a drop in or stagnant population size, local gazetteers reported massive amounts of incoming vagrant workers with not enough good cultivated land for them to till, so that many would become drifters, conmen, or wood-cutters that contributed to deforestation. The Hongzhi and Zhengde emperors lessened the penalties against those who had fled their home region, while the Jiajing Emperor (r. 1521–67) finally had officials register migrants wherever they had moved or fled to bring in more revenues.

Even with the Jiajing reforms to document migrant workers and merchants, by the late Ming era the government census still did not accurately reflect the enormous growth in population. Gazetteers across the empire noted this and made their own estimations of the overall population in the Ming, some guessing that it had doubled, tripled, or even grown fivefold since 1368. Fairbank estimates that the population was perhaps 160 million in the late Ming dynasty, while Brook estimates 175 million, and Ebrey states perhaps as large as 200 million. However, a great epidemic that entered China through the northwest in 1641 ravaged the densely populated areas along the Grand Canal; a gazetteer in northern Zhejiang noted more than half the population fell ill that year and that 90% of the local populace in one area was dead by 1642.

== Qing, 1644 – 1911 ==
The most significant facts of early and mid-Qing social history was growth in population, population density, and mobility. The population in 1700, according to widely accepted estimates, was roughly 150 million, about what it had been under the late Ming a century before, then doubled over the next century, and reached a height of 450 million on the eve of the Taiping Rebellion in 1850. The food supply increased due to better irrigation and especially the introduction of fast-maturing rice seeds, which permitted harvesting two or even three crops a year on the same land. An additional factor was the spread of New World crops like peanuts, potatoes, and especially sweet potatoes. They helped to sustain the people during shortages of harvest for crops such as rice or wheat. These crops could be grown under harsher conditions, and thus were cheaper as well, which led to them becoming staples for poorer farmers, decreasing the number of deaths from malnutrition. Diseases such as smallpox, widespread in the seventeenth century, were brought under control by an increase in inoculations. In addition, infant deaths were also greatly decreased due to improvements in birthing techniques and childcare performed by midwives and doctors. Government campaigns lowered the incidence of infanticide. Unlike Europe, where numerical growth in this period was greatest in the cities, in China the growth in cities and the lower Yangzi was low. The greatest growth was in the borderlands and the highlands, where farmers could clear large tracts of marshlands and forests.

The population was also remarkably mobile, perhaps more so than at any time in Chinese history. Indeed, the Qing government did far more to encourage mobility than to discourage it. Millions of Han Chinese migrated to Yunnan and Guizhou in the 18th century, and also to Taiwan. After the conquests of the 1750s and 1760s, the court organized agricultural colonies in Xinjiang. Migration might be permanent, for resettlement, or the migrants (in theory at least) might regard the move as a sojourn. The latter included an increasingly large and mobile workforce. Local-origin-based merchant groups also moved freely. This mobility also included the organized movement of Qing subjects overseas, largely to Southeastern Asia, in search of trade and other economic opportunities.

== Famines ==
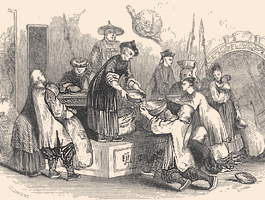
Chinese officials engaged in famine relief, 19th-century engraving

Chinese scholars had kept count of 1,828 instances of famine from 108 BC to 1911 in one province or another—an average of close to one famine per year. From 1333 to 1337 a famine in the north killed 6 million Chinese. The four famines of 1810, 1811, 1846, and 1849 cost perhaps 45 million lives.

The period from 1850 to 1873 saw, as a result of the Taiping Rebellion, drought, and famine, the population of China drop by over 30 million people. China's Qing Dynasty bureaucracy, which devoted extensive attention to minimizing famines, is credited with averting a series of famines following El Niño-Southern Oscillation-linked droughts and floods. These events are comparable, though somewhat smaller in scale, to the ecological trigger events of China's vast 19th-century famines. Qing China carried out its relief efforts, which included vast shipments of food, a requirement that the rich open their storehouses to the poor, and price regulation, as part of a state guarantee of subsistence to the peasantry (known as ming-sheng).

When a stressed monarchy shifted from state management and direct shipments of grain to monetary charity in the mid-19th century, the system broke down. Thus the 1867–68 famine under the Tongzhi Restoration was successfully relieved but the Great North China Famine of 1876–79, caused by drought across northern China, was a catastrophe. The province of Shanxi was substantially depopulated as grains ran out, and desperately starving people stripped forests, fields, and their very houses for food. Estimated mortality is 9.5 to 13 million people.

=== Great Leap Forward: 1958–1961 ===
The largest famine of the 20th century, and almost certainly of all time, was the 1958–1961 famine associated with the Great Leap Forward in China. The immediate causes of this famine lay in Mao Zedong's ill-fated attempt to transform China from an agricultural nation to an industrial power in one huge leap. Communist Party cadres across China insisted that peasants abandon their farms for collective farms, and begin to produce steel in small foundries, often melting down their farm instruments in the process. Collectivisation undermined incentives for the investment of labor and resources in agriculture; unrealistic plans for decentralized metal production sapped needed labor; unfavorable weather conditions; and communal dining halls encouraged overconsumption of available food. Such was the centralized control of information and the intense pressure on party cadres to report only good news—such as production quotas met or exceeded—that information about the escalating disaster was effectively suppressed. When the leadership did become aware of the scale of the famine, it did little to respond, and continued to ban any discussion of the cataclysm. This blanket suppression of news was so effective that very few Chinese citizens were aware of the scale of the famine, and the greatest peacetime demographic disaster of the 20th century only became widely known twenty years later, when the veil of censorship began to lift.

The estimated number of excess deaths (accounting low benchmark mortality rate from 1949 to 1959) during 1958–1961 range from 18 million to at least 42 million. Agricultural collectivisation policies began to be reversed in 1978.

== Chinese diaspora ==
Chinese emigration first occurred thousands of years ago. The mass emigration that occurred from the 19th century to 1949 was caused mainly by wars and starvation in mainland China, as well as political corruption. Most migrants were illiterate or poorly educated peasants, called by the now-recognized racial slur coolies (Chinese: 苦力, literally "hard labor"), who migrated to developing countries in need of labor, such as the Americas, Australia, South Africa, Southeast Asia, Malaya and other places.

In 2009, there were 40-45 million overseas Chinese. They lived in 180 countries; 75% lived in Southeast Asia, and 19% in the United States.

In 2011, 73.3% of overseas Chinese lived in 35 Asian countries, and 18.6% in 40 countries of the Americas.

== One-child policy ==
From 1980 to 2015, the government of China permitted the great majority of families to have only one child. During this time, the birth rate dropped from nearly 6 children per woman to just under 3. (The colloquial term "births per woman" is usually formalized as the Total Fertility Rate (TFR), a technical term in demographic analysis meaning the average number of children that would be born to a woman over her lifetime if she were to experience the exact current age-specific fertility rates through her lifetime.)

As China's youngest generation (born under the one-child policy) came of age for formation of the next generation, a single child would be left with having to provide support for their two parents and four grandparents. By 2014 families could have two children if one of the parents is an only child.

The policy was supposedly voluntary. It was more strongly enforced in urban areas, where housing was in very short supply. Policies included free contraceptives, financial and employment incentives, economic penalties, and sometimes forced abortions and sterilizations.

=== Two-child policy ===
After 2000 the policy was steadily relaxed. Han Chinese living in rural areas were often permitted to have two children, as exceptions existed if the first child was a daughter. Because of cases such as these, as well as urban couples who simply paid a fine (or "social maintenance fee") to have more children, the overall fertility rate of mainland China during the 2000s was, in fact, around 1.8, closer to two children per family than to one child per family. In addition, since 2012, Han Chinese in southern Xinjiang were allowed to have two children. This, along with incentives and restrictions against higher Muslim Uyghur fertility, was seen as attempt to counter the threat of Uyghur separatism.

In 2016 the national policy changed to a two-child policy; in 2018 it changed to a three-policy. The new policies were meant to help address the aging issue in China.

In 2018, about two years after the new policy reform, China is facing new ramifications from the two-child policy. Since the revision of the one-child policy, 90 million women have become eligible to have a second child. According to The Economist, the new two-child policy may have negative implications on gender roles, with new expectations for women to bear more children and to abandon their careers.

After the reform, China saw a short-lived boost in fertility rate for 2016. Chinese women gave birth to 17.9 million babies in 2016 (a record value in the 21st century), but the number of births declined by 3.5% to 17.2 million in 2017, and to 15.2 million in 2018.

In China, men still have greater marital power, which increases fertility pressure on their female partners. The dynamic of relationships (amount of "power" held by each parent), and the amount of resources each parent has contributes to the struggle for dominance. Resources would be items such as income, and health insurance. Dominance would be described as who has the final say in pregnancy, who has to resign in their career for maternal/parental leave. However, women have shown interest in a second child if the first child did not possess the desired gender.

Chinese couples were also polled and stated that they would rather invest in one child as opposed to two children. To add, another concern for couples would be the high costs of raising another child; China's childcare system needs to be further developed. The change in cultural norms appears to be having negative consequences and leads to fear of a large aging population with smaller younger generations; thus the lack of workforce to drive the economy.

In May 2018, it was reported that Chinese authorities were in the process of ending their population control policies. In May 2021, the Chinese government announced it would scrap the two child limit in favour of a three child limit, to mitigate the country's falling birth rates and rapid increase in old people, coupled with a shrinkage in the number of working age people.

=== Three-child policy ===
Following the release of 2020 Chinese census data showing that the population had grown at its slowest pace since the 1950s, the Politburo of the Chinese Communist Party announced on 31 May 2021 that couples would be permitted to have up to three children. In August 2021, the Standing Committee of the National People's Congress formally amended the Population and Family Planning Law to enact the three-child policy and abolished "social maintenance fees" (fines) as well as other penalties for exceeding birth limits.

To encourage larger families, central and local authorities introduced supportive measures including extended maternity and parental leave, tax deductions for childcare expenses, expanded public nursery services, and financial subsidies or housing preferences in several provinces and cities. Despite these incentives, the policy had minimal immediate effect on reversing China's demographic decline; total births fell to 10.62 million in 2021 and 9.56 million in 2022, with third-born children accounting for only 15% of births in 2022. Demographers and sociologists attributed the low uptake to the high costs of housing, education, and child-rearing, alongside persistent workplace gender discrimination against mothers. Human rights organizations also noted that retaining a statutory limit on family size continued to restrict women's reproductive autonomy.

By 2023, India had surpassed China in total population.

== See also ==
- Agriculture in China
- China § Demographics
- Migration in China
- Demographics of China
- Economic history of China
- One-child policy, in operation 1980–2016
  - Two-child policy, begun in 2016
  - Three-child policy, begun in 2021
- Overseas Chinese
