= Shanghainese people =

Ethnic group

Shanghainese 上海人
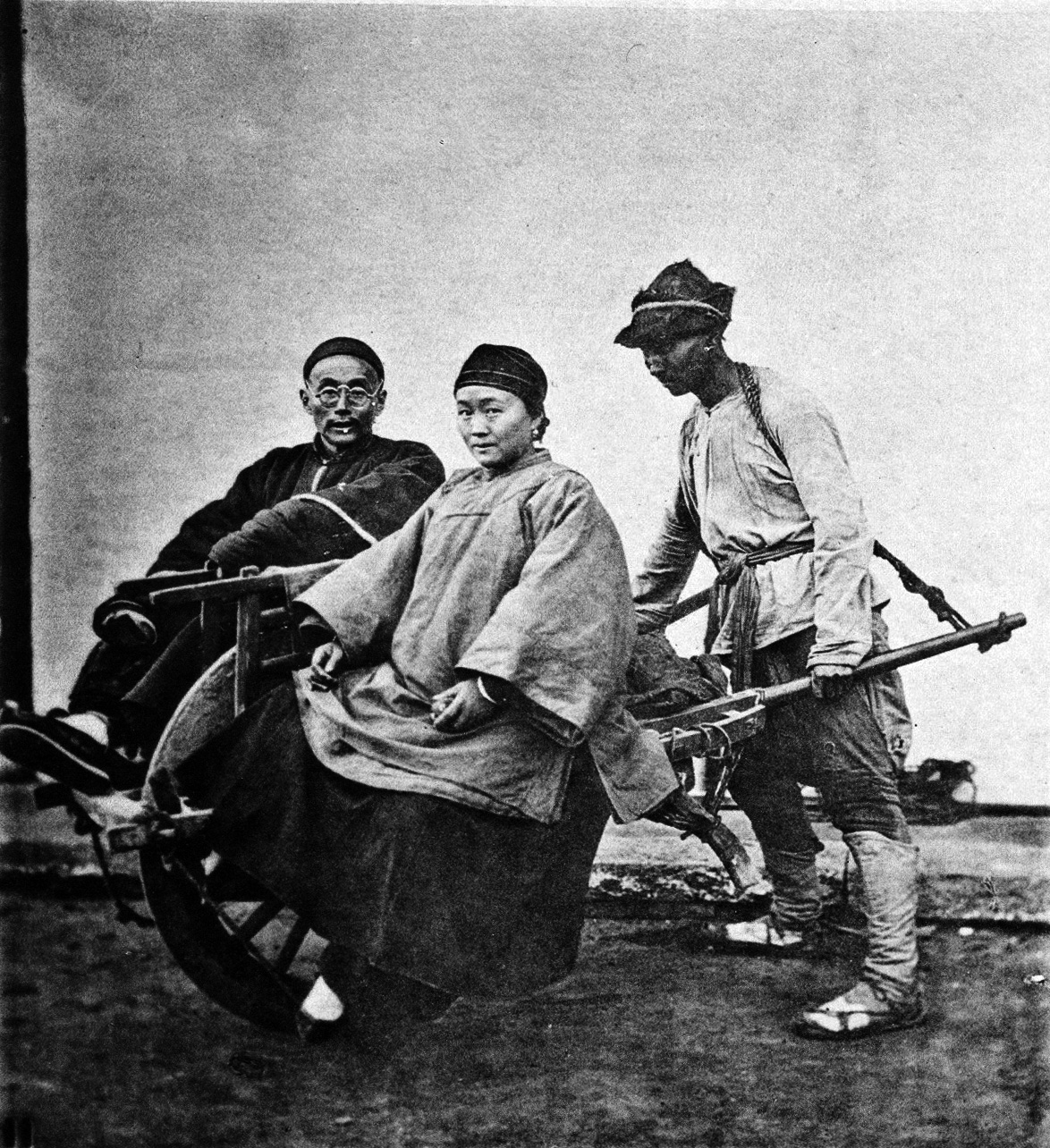
- A Shanghainese man and woman on a wheel barrow, pre-1898.

Total population
- approximately 20,000,000

Regions with significant populations
- Mainland China: 14,000,000 people
- Hong Kong: approximately 75,000 - 250,000
- Japan: approximately 60,000
- Taiwan: As part of Waishengren population
- United States: approximately 250,000 - 300,000
- Canada: As part of Chinese Canadian population
- Australia: As part of Chinese Australian population
- Singapore: As part of Chinese Singaporean population

Languages
- Shanghainese and other Taihu Wu dialects (parent tongues), Mandarin, Cantonese (by those residing in Hong Kong) and English (those who live in the Overseas Chinese diaspora population)

Religion
- Predominantly Mahayana Buddhism and Chinese folk religions (including Taoism, Confucianism, ancestral worship and others), with many non religious. Minority: Christianity

Related ethnic groups
- Wuyue people and other Han Chinese

Shanghainese people (Chinese: 上海人; pinyin: Shànghǎirén; Shanghainese: Zaanhe-nyin [zɑ̃̀hɛ́.ɲɪ̀ɲ]) are an ethnographic subgroup who have ancestral roots from Shanghai. Most Shanghainese are descended from immigrants from nearby provinces of Zhejiang and Jiangsu. According to 1990 census, 85% of Shanghainese people trace their ancestry to Jiangsu and Zhejiang. Only a minority are Shanghai natives, those with ancestral roots in Shanghai.

The Old City of Shanghai was a minor settlement until the later Qing Dynasty and many districts of the present municipality of Shanghai originally had separate identities, including separate but related dialects of Taihu Wu. In recent decades, millions of Chinese have moved to the city, both as internal immigrants and as migrant workers. The 2010 Chinese census found 9 million of Shanghai's 23 million residents (almost 40%) were migrants without a Shanghai hukou, triple the number from the year 2000 census. These "New Shanghainese" (新上海人) are generally distinguished from the Shanghainese proper as they usually don't speak the Shanghainese language.

== Definition ==
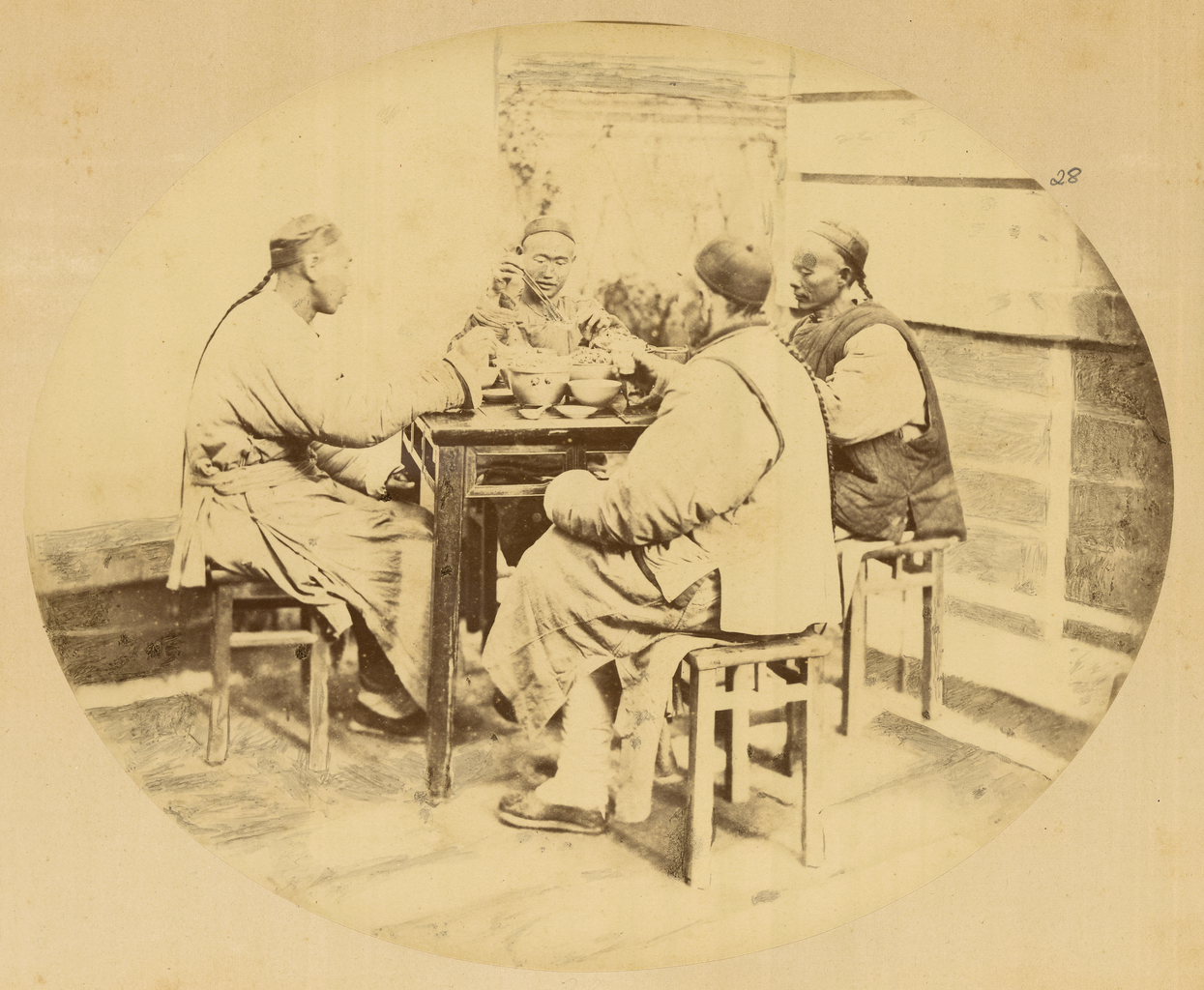
Group of men at dinner. Shanghai, China, 1874.

The term "Shanghainese" may thus apply to several different groups of varying exclusivity. Legally, it refers to those holding a hukou for one of the local governments in the municipality of Shanghai. Culturally, it most often means those who consider Shanghai to be their home city.

The term Shanghainese may also refer more broadly to people from areas of the Jiangnan cultural region in Jiangsu and Zhejiang. Additionally a great number of people from Shanghai itself have ancestry in these adjacent regions.

== Shanghainese diaspora ==
Although Shanghai was long a cosmopolitan city as one of Qing Dynasty's treaty ports, its people was not connected with the large-scale emigration seen amongst the Fujianese and Cantonese. Maritime commerce did, however, create a Shanghainese community in Hong Kong. These Shanghainese or their forebears fled China prior to the formation of the People's Republic of China by the Chinese Communist Party in 1949. Some actors and actresses on the TVB network, a television network based in Hong Kong, are originally from Shanghai, such as Liza Wang, Tracy Ip and Lydia Shum.

More recently, appreciable numbers of Shanghainese have migrated to other countries. There is a significant Shanghainese community in Sydney, especially in the suburbs of Ashfield, Burwood and Epping. Less-prominent communities exist in the Chinatowns of other large metropolitan areas such as New York and San Francisco in the United States, as well as Toronto and Vancouver in Canada.

== See also ==
- Shanghailanders
- Han Chinese
- Haipai
- Demographics of Shanghai
- List of modern scientists from Shanghai
