= 1982 Chinese census =

1982 census of the population of China

Third National Census
← 1964	27 October 1982	1990 →

General information
- Country: China

Results
- Total population: 1,008,180,738
- Most populous province: Henan
- Least populous province: Tibet Autonomous Region

The 1982 Chinese census, officially the Third National Population Census of the People's Republic of China, was conducted by the People's Republic of China with a zero hour of 1 July 1982. A summary of the results were issued by the State Security Bureau and reported in the People's Daily on October 27, 1982.

Preparations for the census were begun in 1976, with fact-finding missions sent to the United States and Japan to review their methods. Computers were installed in every provincial capital except Tibet; these were linked to a central processing unit at the Beijing office of the State Statistical Bureau. Pretests and trial runs occurred in 1980 and 1981. It was not until after this census had begun that the second census of 1964 was officially acknowledged to have occurred at all. It had been an eighteen-year hiatus, and it wouldn't be until 1987 that China adopted a decennial plan, beginning with the 1990 census.

Approximately five million census takers interviewed a representative of each household in China over the month beginning 1 July 1982. In rural areas, census stations were located at production brigades.

The 1982 census removed the previous census's question about class status, but expanded other areas of inquiry. Nineteen demographic categories were covered, thirteen concerning individuals – name, relationship to the head of one's household, sex, age, ethnicity, registration status, educational level, profession, occupation, status if unemployed, marital status, number of living children, number of births in 1981 – and six concerning households – size, type (domestic or collective), serial number, number of births in 1981, number of deaths in 1981, and number of registered persons absent longer than one year.

== Results ==
=== Total population ===
The census found the total population of Mainland China in 1982 as 1,008,180,738. Official Chinese sources such as Xinhua, however, sometimes still report a result of 1,031,900,000. From two newspaper cuttings (China Daily) dated Thursday October 28, 1982 the figure was 1,031,882,511.

=== Demographics ===
The census found approximately 519,440,000 men and 488,740,000 women living in China, a ratio of 106.30 to 100.

The average household size was 4.41, almost unchanged since the previous census. 33.59% of the population was 14 or under; 61.50% of the population was between 15 and 64; and 4.91% of the population was 65 or older. Life expectancy was estimated to be 66.28 years for males and 69.27 years for females.

Han Chinese accounted for approximately 940,880,000 persons (93.32% of the total). Minorities accounted for approx. 67,300,000 persons (6.68%).

Early accounts listed an urbanized population of 206.59 million, but this was subsequently revised to 210,820,000. This urbanization rate of 20.91% was an increase of 2.61 percentage points from 1964.

=== Provincial distribution ===
Province or autonomous region	1964 Census	1982 Census	Change	% Change
Anhui	31,241,657	49,665,724	▲18,424,073	58.97
Fujian	16,757,223	25,931,106	▲9,173,883	54.75
Gansu (Note: The population Ningxia was detached from the 1964 figures.)	12,630,569	19,569,261	▲6,938,692	54.94
Guangdong (Note: Includes the modern Hainan province.)	42,800,849	59,299,220	▲16,498,371	38.55
Guizhou	17,140,521	28,552,997	▲11,412,476	66.58
Hebei (Note: 1964 figure incorporates Tianjin municipality.)	45,687,781	53,005,876	▲7,318,095	16.02
Henan	50,325,511	74,422,739	▲14,097,228	28.01
Heilongjiang	20,118,271	32,665,546	▲12,547,275	62.37
Hubei	33,709,344	47,804,150	▲14,094,806	41.81
Hunan	37,182,286	54,008,851	▲16,827,565	45.26
Jiangsu	44,504,608	60,521,114	▲16,016,506	35.99
Jiangxi	21,068,019	33,184,827	▲12,116,808	57.51
Jilin	15,668,663	22,560,053	▲6,891,390	43.98
Liaoning	26,946,200	35,721,693	▲8,775,493	32.57
Qinghai	2,145,604	3,895,706	▲1,750,102	81.57
Sichuan (Note: Includes the modern Chongqing municipality.)	67,956,490	99,713,310	▲31,756,820	46.73
Shaanxi	20,766,915	28,904,423	▲8,137,508	39.18
Shandong	55,519,038	74,419,054	▲18,900,016	34.04
Shanxi	18,015,067	25,291,389	▲7,276,322	40.39
Yunnan	20,509,525	32,553,817	▲12,044,292	58.73
Zhejiang	28,318,573	38,884,603	▲10,566,030	37.31
Guangxi Zhuang Autonomous Region	20,845,017	36,420,960	▲15,585,943	74.77
Inner Mongolia Autonomous Region	12,348,638	19,274,279	▲6,925,641	56.08
Xizang Autonomous Region (Tibet)	1,251,225	1,892,393	▲641,168	51.24
Xinjiang Uygur Autonomous Region	7,270,067	13,081,681	▲5,811,614	79.94
Beijing Municipality	7,568,495	9,230,687	▲1,662,192	21.96
Shanghai Municipality	10,816,458	11,859,748	▲1,043,290	9.65
Tianjin Municipality		7,764,141		
Total	694,581,759	1,008,180,738	▲313,599,019	45.15%

=== Surnames ===
In 2004, the 1982 census results were used to create a series of postage stamps honoring the 100 then–most common surnames:

李 王 张 刘 陈 杨 赵 黄 周 吴

徐 孙 胡 朱 高 林 何 郭 马 罗

梁 宋 郑 谢 韩 唐 冯 于 董 萧

程 曹 袁 邓 许 傅 沈 曾 彭 吕

苏 卢 蒋 蔡 贾 丁 魏 薛 叶 阎

佘 潘 杜 戴 夏 钟 汪 田 任 姜

范 方 石 姚 谭 廖 邹 熊 金 陆

郝 孔 白 崔 康 毛 邱 秦 江 史

顾 侯 邵 孟 龙 万 段 雷 钱 汤

尹 易 黎 常 武 乔 贺 赖 龚 文

== Controversy ==
Although praised as more accurate than the previous censuses in 1953 and 1964, the 1982 census suffered from irregularities as well. In particular, while the number of official cities shrank from previous lists, the urban population itself increased by more than 50% from a 1981 estimate of 138.70 million to the 1982 census total of 206.59 million.

Another anomaly was that birth and death rates recorded by the census and household registration system differed but arrived at similar totals. Both deaths and births were found to have been underreported to the registration system, to maintain rations allocated to the deceased and to avoid punishment for violations of the recent One-Child Policy.

The publication of the 1964 data also allowed mortality and survival rates of recent generations to be analyzed in greater detail, revealing an enormous fall-off in surviving children born during the Great Leap Forward as well as an equally large surge afterwards.

== See also ==
- Demographics of China
- Urbanization in China
- Census in China
