= Headman =

Headman may refer to:

- Village head, an occupation or role
- Tribal chief, an occupation or role
- Dibao, a village-level Qing official
- Tusi (Chinese: 土司, p tǔsī), tribal leaders recognized or appointed by the Chinese over nearby peoples
- Penghulu, a Malay local chief
- Headman Shabalala (1945–1991), South African singer
- Headman (G.I. Joe), a fictional villain in the G.I. Joe universe
