= Census in China =

In China, forms of census have been held since antiquity and throughout the imperial period. Modern censuses under the Republic and People's Republic of China were initially irregular. From 1990, a national census has been held at the end of each decade.

== Imperial China ==
Full censuses were held irregularly under imperial China, although local headmen were normally required to maintain accurate running counts of nearby households to meet tax and corvee obligations in a fair manner. The census then consisted of prefectural, provincial, and national officials systematically gathering, computing, and recording the tallies held by lower levels of the administration.

Much of the census held by the Western Han in AD 2 was preserved in its dynastic history, the Book of Han, and it is held by modern scholars to have been quite accurate. On that occasion, taking only taxable families into account to calculate proper revenue and available soldiers, the empire was reckoned to have 57,671,400 individuals in 12,366,470 households. From that time to end of the Qing in 1911, 104 national censuses were conducted, roughly one every 15 years outside of prolonged periods of instability from 158–262 during the late Han and Three Kingdoms periods, from 371–463 during the late Jin and early Northern and Southern dynasties, and from 847–958 during the late Tang and early Five Dynasties. Of those 104 censuses, 54 included both individual and household totals, producing average household sizes of 5–6 individuals.

A Tang census in 742 reported the population of the prefecture around the capital Chang'an as nearly 2 million. The city itself was said to have around a million people within its walls.

== Censuses of the Republic of China ==
The Republic of China never held a full national census during its period of control over mainland China. Based on surveys, however, it released a number of official population figures from its Ministry of Home Affairs and its Ministry of the Interior:

Official ROC Population Estimates
Year Made	Population (Mainland China only)
1912	405,800,000
1928	▲441,800,000
1931	▲474,780,000
1936	▼471,100,000
1947	▼461,000,000

Based on the more complete and apparently accurate 1953 PRC census, the earlier ROC enumerations are now considered to have significantly undercounted the Chinese population since the differences involved would otherwise indicate an extremely improbable growth rate throughout World War II and the Chinese Civil War and an impossible growth rate in the late 1940s.

== Censuses of the People's Republic of China ==
Under Mao Zedong, the People's Republic of China held its first census in 1952, but—owing to the disruption created by various policies of the Great Leap Forward—the second in 1963 was secret and unacknowledged until the early 1980s.

The 1982 Chinese census was much more thorough and well-conducted than the first two, and similar censuses have been conducted by the National Bureau of Statistics in 1990, 2000, 2010, and 2020. These are the world's biggest censuses and over 6 million enumerators were engaged in the 2000 and 2010 censuses.

Between the national censuses, 1% National Population Sample Surveys were taken in 1987, 1995, and 2005; 0.1% National Population Sample Surveys have been taken annually since 2000. National agricultural, economic, and industrial censuses are also taken on a regular basis. The first economic census was taken in 2004 and the second 2008.

Topline PRC Census Figures
No.	Year Completed	Population (Mainland China only)	Article
1st	1953	▲582,603,417	1953 Chinese census
2nd	1964	▲694,581,759	1964 Chinese census
3rd	1982	▲1,008,180,738	1982 Chinese census
4th	1990	▲1,133,683,417	1990 Chinese census
5th	2000	▲1,245,110,826	2000 Chinese census
6th	2010	▲1,339,724,852	2010 Chinese census
7th	2020	▲1,411,778,724	2020 Chinese census

== See also ==
- China microcensus
- National Bureau of Statistics of China
