= 1964 Chinese census =

1964 census of the population of China

Second National Census
← 1953	1964	1982 →

General information
- Country: China

Results
- Total population: 694,581,759
- Most populous province: Henan
- Least populous province: Tibet Autonomous Region

The 1964 Chinese census, officially the Second National Population Census of the People's Republic of China, was conducted by the People's Republic of China with a zero hour of 1 July 1964. The census results were not publicized until the early 1980s.

The 1964 census included additional information about education, occupation, and class to the information gathered by the first census concerning name, age, sex, nationality, and relationship to heads of households.

== Results ==
=== Total population ===
The census found that the total population of Mainland China in 1964 was 694,581,759.

However, the official summaries published in Chinese Sociology and Anthropology by the Chinese State Statistical Bureau in 1984 listed the 1964 population as 723,070,269. China's official Xinhua news organization continues to report more significant figure.

=== Demographics ===
The census found approximately 356,520,000 men and 338,060,000 women living in China, a ratio of 105.46 to 100.

The average household size was 4.43, increasing by ^{1}/_{10} person per household from the previous census. 40.69% of the population was 14, or under, 55.75% was between 15 and 64, and 3.56% was 65 or older.

Han Chinese accounted for approximately 654,560,000 persons (94.24% of the total). Minorities accounted for approx—forty million twenty thousand persons (5.76%).

127,100,000 Chinese were classified as living in cities, with an urbanization rate of 18.30%.

=== Provincial distribution ===
Province or autonomous region	1953 Census	1964 Census	Change	% Change
Anhui	30,343,637	31,241,657	▲898,020	2.96
Fujian	13,142,721	16,757,223	▲3,614,502	27.50
Gansu (Note: The population Ningxia was detached from the 1964 figures.)	12,928,102	12,630,569	▼-297,533	-2.30
Guangdong (Note: Includes the modern Hainan province.)	34,770,059	42,800,849	▲8,030,790	23.10
Guizhou	15,037,310	17,140,521	▲2,103,211	13.99
Hebei (Note: All 1964 figures incorporate Tianjin municipality.) (Note: 1964 population figure includes incorporation of parts of Rehe Province.)	35,984,644	45,687,781	▲7,009,306	18.12
Henan	44,214,594	50,325,511	▲6,110,917	13.82
Heilongjiang	11,897,309	20,118,271	▲8,220,962	69.10
Hubei	27,789,693	33,709,344	▲5,919,651	21.30
Hunan	33,226,954	37,182,286	▲3,955,332	11.90
Jiangsu	41,252,192	44,504,608	▲3,252,416	7.88
Jiangxi	16,772,865	21,068,019	▲4,295,154	25.61
Jilin	11,290,073	15,668,663	▲4,378,590	38.78
Liaoning	18,545,147	26,946,200	▲8,401,053	45.30
Qinghai	1,676,534	2,145,604	▲469,070	27.98
Rehe	5,160,822			
Sichuan (Note: Includes the modern Chongqing municipality.) (Note: All 1964 figures incorporate Xikang province.)	62,303,999	67,956,490	▲2,271,427	3.46
Shaanxi	15,881,281	20,766,915	▲4,885,634	30.76
Shandong	48,876,548	55,519,038	▲6,642,490	13.59
Shanxi	14,314,485	18,015,067	▲3,700,582	25.85
Xikang	3,381,064			
Yunnan	17,472,737	20,509,525	▲3,036,788	17.38
Zhejiang	22,865,747	28,318,573	▲5,452,826	23.85
Guangxi Zhuang Autonomous Region	19,560,822	20,845,017	▲1,284,195	6.57
Inner Mongolia Autonomous Region	6,100,104	12,348,638	▲6,248,534	102.4
Xizang Autonomous Region (Tibet)	1,273,969	1,251,225	▼-22,744	-1.79
Xinjiang Uygur Autonomous Region	4,873,608	7,270,067	▲2,396,459	49.17
Beijing Municipality	2,768,149	7,568,495	▲4,800,346	173.4
Shanghai Municipality	6,204,417	10,816,458	▲4,612,041	74.33
Tianjin Municipality	2,693,831			
Total	582,603,417	694,581,759	▲111,978,342	19.22

== Controversy ==
As with the 1953 census, the accuracy of the Second National Population Census was questioned by many outside observers. The information collected about occupation and education could have been more systematic, and it could not even be accurately tabulated even though the nation's illiteracy rate was recorded at 32.26% and 33.58%.

== See also ==
- Demographics of China
- Urbanization in the People's Republic of China
- National Population Census of the People's Republic of China
  - First National Population Census of the People's Republic of China (1953)
  - Third National Population Census of the People's Republic of China (1982)
  - Sixth National Population Census of the People's Republic of China (2010)
