= China microcensus =

Survey in China

The China microcensus (全国1%人口抽样调查) is an intercensal survey to measure the population, in between official censuses. It is conducted every year that ends in 5. In 2015, the survey began on November 1 at midnight. Data are broken down to at least the municipal level and include residency (hukou) as well as ethnicity.
