= 2020 Chinese census =

Seventh National Population Census
- November 1, 2020
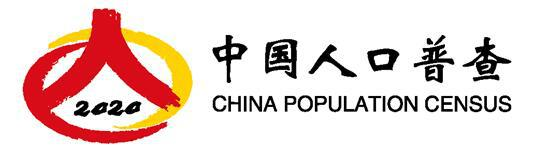

General information
- Country: China

Results
- Total population: 1,411,778,724 (▲5.4%)
- Most populous province: Guangdong
- Least populous province: Tibet Autonomous Region

The Seventh National Population Census of the People's Republic of China (Chinese: 第七次全国人口普查; pinyin: Dì Qī Cì Quánguó Rénkǒu Pǔchá), also referred to as the 2020 Chinese Census, was the seventh national census conducted by the National Bureau of Statistics of the People's Republic of China. Census work began on November 1, 2020, and continued through December 10, 2020, involving seven million census workers.

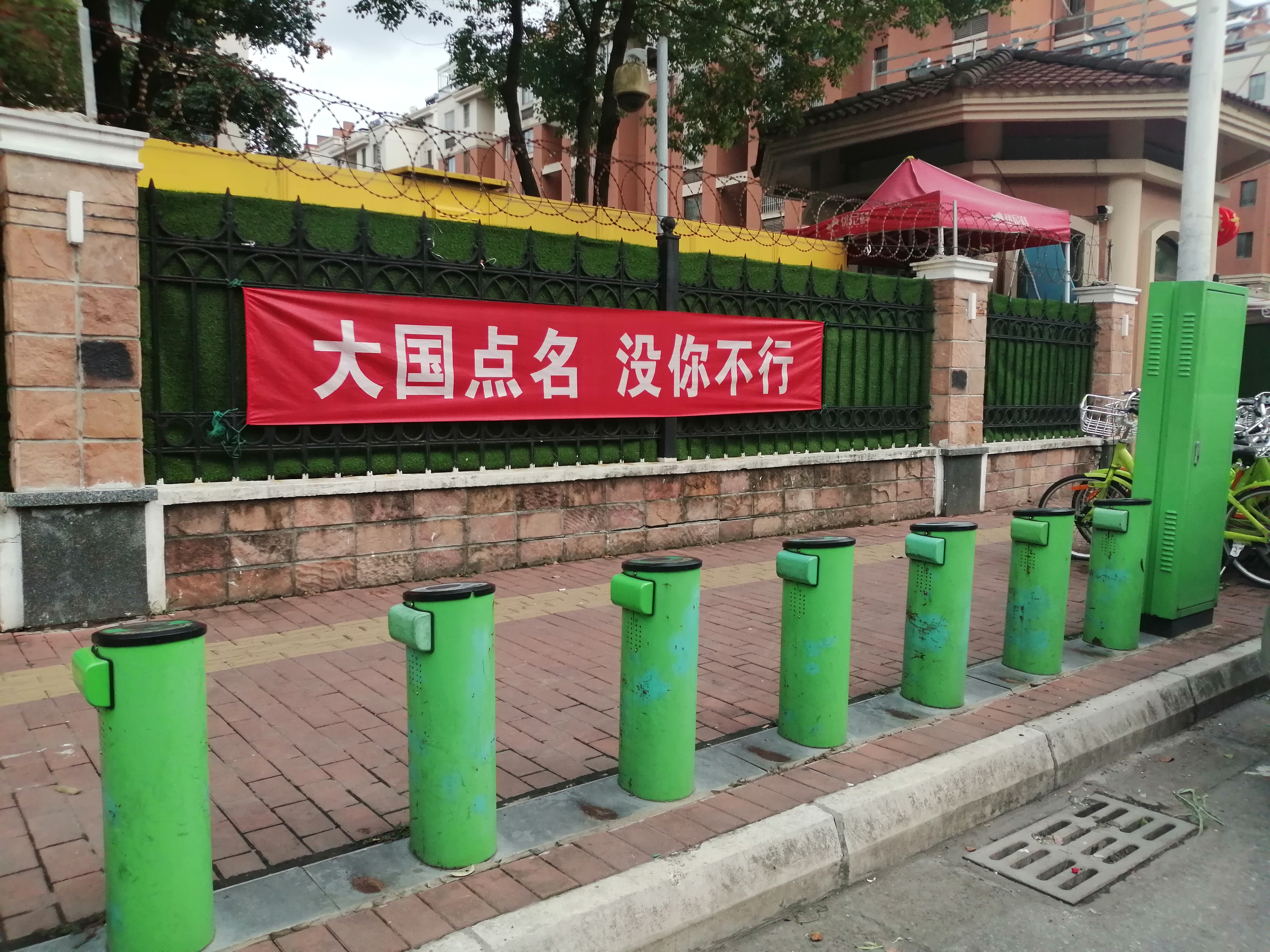
A slogan urging people to participate in the census, "Dàguó Diǎnmíng, Méi Nǐ Bùxíng" (大国点名没你不行, literally "a great nation calls the roll, it doesn't work without you") in Suzhou, Jiangsu, China

The 2020 Chinese census covers all Chinese citizens living in mainland China, as well as those living abroad on temporary visas. Foreigners who live in the mainland for more than six months are also recorded in the data.

The preliminary results were released on May 11, 2021, with a news conference being held on the same day. The release was originally planned to be in early April, but was delayed by a month.

== Census result ==
The population of mainland China was 1,411,778,724 as of November 1, 2020. In addition, Hong Kong's population was 7,474,200 (provided by the Hong Kong SAR Government at the end of 2020) and Macau's population was 683,218 (provided by the Macau SAR Government at the end of 2020).

Population comparison table by provincial-level administrative unit
Region	Resident population (Note: The resident population includes: anyone who lives in a township and has a household registration in the township or their registration is to be determined; anyone who lives in a township and has been away from the township where their household is registered for more than six months; anyone who has an account in a township and has been away for less than six months or who is working and studying outside the country.)		Sex		Age				Highest education			
Region	Population	Proportion (%)	Female (%)	Male (%)	0 to 14 (%)	15 to 59 (%)	60 and above (%)	65 and above (%)	College (%)	High school (%)	Middle school (%)	Elementary school (%)
Mainland China	1,411,778,724	100	51.24	48.76	17.95	63.35	18.70	13.50	15.47	15.09	34.51	24.77
Beijing	21,893,095	1.55	51.14	48.86	11.84	68.53	19.63	13.30	41.98	17.59	23.29	10.50
Tianjin	13,866,009	0.98	51.53	48.47	13.47	64.87	21.66	14.75	26.94	17.72	32.29	16.12
Hebei	74,610,235	5.28	50.50	49.50	20.22	59.92	19.85	13.92	12.42	13.86	39.95	24.66
Shanxi	34,915,616	2.47	50.99	49.01	16.35	64.72	18.92	12.90	17.36	16.49	38.95	19.51
Inner Mongolia	24,049,155	1.70	51.04	48.96	14.04	66.17	19.78	13.05	18.69	14.81	33.86	23.63
Liaoning	42,591,407	3.02	49.92	50.08	11.12	63.16	25.72	17.42	18.22	14.67	42.80	18.89
Jilin	24,073,453	1.71	49.92	50.08	11.71	65.23	23.06	17.42	16.74	17.08	38.23	22.32
Heilongjiang	31,850,088	2.26	50.09	49.91	10.32	66.46	23.22	15.61	14.79	15.53	42.79	21.86
Shanghai	24,870,895	1.76	51.77	48.23	9.80	66.82	23.38	16.28	33.87	19.02	28.94	11.93
Jiangsu	84,748,016	6.00	50.78	49.22	15.21	62.95	21.84	16.20	18.66	16.19	33.31	22.74
Zhejiang	64,567,588	4.57	52.16	47.84	13.45	67.86	18.70	13.27	16.99	14.56	32.71	26.38
Anhui	61,027,171	4.32	50.97	49.03	19.24	61.96	18.79	15.01	13.28	13.29	33.72	26.88
Fujian	41,540,086	2.94	51.68	48.32	19.32	64.70	15.98	11.10	14.15	14.21	32.22	28.03
Jiangxi	45,188,635	3.20	51.60	48.40	21.96	61.17	16.87	11.89	11.90	15.15	35.50	27.51
Shandong	101,527,453	7.19	50.66	49.34	18.78	60.32	20.90	15.13	14.38	14.33	35.78	23.69
Henan	99,365,519	7.04	50.15	49.85	23.14	58.79	18.08	13.49	11.74	15.24	37.52	24.56
Hubei	57,752,557	4.09	51.42	48.58	16.31	63.26	20.42	14.59	15.50	17.43	34.28	23.52
Hunan	66,444,864	4.71	51.16	48.84	19.52	60.60	19.88	14.81	12.24	17.78	35.64	25.21
Guangdong	126,012,510	8.93	53.07	46.93	18.85	68.80	12.35	8.58	15.70	18.22	35.48	20.68
Guangxi	50,126,804	3.55	51.70	48.30	23.63	59.69	16.69	12.20	10.81	12.96	36.39	27.86
Hainan	10,081,232	0.71	53.02	46.98	19.97	65.38	14.65	10.43	13.92	15.56	40.17	19.70
Chongqing	32,054,159	2.27	50.55	49.45	15.91	62.22	21.87	17.08	15.41	15.96	30.58	29.89
Sichuan	83,674,866	5.93	50.54	49.46	16.10	62.19	21.71	16.93	13.27	13.30	31.44	31.32
Guizhou	38,562,148	2.73	51.10	48.90	23.97	60.65	15.38	11.56	10.95	9.95	30.46	31.92
Yunnan	47,209,277	3.34	51.73	48.27	19.57	65.52	14.91	10.75	11.60	10.34	29.24	35.67
Tibet	3,648,100	0.26	52.45	47.55	24.53	66.95	8.52	5.67	11.02	7.05	15.76	32.11
Shaanxi	39,528,999	2.80	51.17	48.83	17.33	63.46	19.20	13.32	18.40	15.58	33.98	21.69
Gansu	25,019,831	1.77	50.76	49.24	19.40	63.57	17.03	12.58	14.51	12.94	27.42	29.81
Qinghai	5,923,957	0.42	51.21	48.79	20.81	67.04	12.14	8.68	14.88	10.57	24.34	32.73
Ningxia	7,202,654	0.51	50.94	49.06	20.38	66.09	13.52	9.62	17.34	13.43	29.72	26.11
Xinjiang	25,852,345	1.83	51.66	48.34	22.46	66.26	11.28	7.76	16.54	13.21	31.56	28.41

=== Immigrants ===
According to the census, China has 1,430,695 immigrants, divided between 845,697 foreign nationals and 584,998 residents of Hong Kong, Macao and Taiwan.

== Background ==
Average annual population growth rates in provincial-level administrative units between 2010 and 2020 according to the Chinese National Bureau of Statistics

In October 2015, China scrapped the one-child policy in the hope of boosting the number of births. In 2016, China set a target of increasing its population to about 1.42 billion by 2020, from 1.34 billion in 2010.

After the relaxation of the one-child policy, 17.9 million babies were born in 2016, an increase of 1.3 million over the previous year, but only half of what was expected. In 2017, the birth rate fell to 17.2 million, far below the official forecast of more than 20 million. It is possible that the Chinese government will further relax its fertility policy in the future.

On November 2, 2020, general secretary Xi Jinping answered census workers' questions in Beijing.

The 2020 census showed that the gender ratio of mainland China has improved, with the male-to-female ratio reaching a new record low of 105.07. This is the most balanced gender ration since the People's Republic of China began conducting censuses in 1953.

=== Revisions ===
On April 27, 2021, the Financial Times reported that according to some sources who know the data of the seventh census, Chinese population in 2020 did not meet 1.4 billion. Chinese state media say that mainland Chinese population in 2019 was 1.40005 billion. If true, this would indicate the first population decline since the Great Leap Forward.

On April 28, 2021, Bloomberg News, quoting the Chinese state media outlet the Global Times, reported that it is unlikely there would be a drop in the total population in the 2020 census, citing a comment by Lu Jiehua, a professor at Peking University. Still, it was reported that China's population may peak in 2022, which is much earlier than previously estimated.

In May 2021, the National Bureau of Statistics of China released a report revising the data for the previous 10 years before the 2020 census. They announced that there were about 10 million more births between 2011 and 2019 than previously thought. That means there were actually more births before Beijing ended one-child policy in 2016.

== See also ==
- Census in China
