= Dibao =

Local officials in Qing China

Dibao (ti-pao), (Note: Chinese: 地保; pinyin: dìbǎo; Wade–Giles: ti^{4}-pao^{3}; lit. 'land guarantor'; also romanized as tepao.) sometimes called headmen or constables, were local officials in Qing and early Republican China, typically selected from among the prominent landowners. Working in communities of around 100 households, they were charged with overseeing boundaries and land disputes. He notarized all real estate deeds on a commission basis and collected the land tax, as well as overseeing minor punishment such as the cangue.

As foreign missionaries and businessmen gained the right to hold property in China from the unequal treaties, the local headmen could be caught between them and their superiors in the Chinese hierarchy, for instance during the construction of the Woosung Road.

The dibao administered villages under the ordinary Chinese administrative system. A similar office called the shoubao (shou-pao) was established under the Qing in 1725 to manage the Banner system.

The dibao were the successors of the Qin and Han tingzhang, (Note: simplified Chinese: 亭长; traditional Chinese: 亭長; pinyin: tíngzhǎng; Wade–Giles: t'ing^{2}-chang^{3}.) the Sui and Tang lizheng, (Note: Chinese: 里正; pinyin: lǐzhèng; Wade–Giles: li^{3}-cheng^{4}.) and Song baozheng. (Note: Chinese: 保正; pinyin: bǎozhèng; Wade–Giles: pao^{3}-cheng^{4}.) They were occasionally also known as baozheng or as dijia (Note: Chinese: 地甲; pinyin: dìjiǎ; Wade–Giles: ti^{4}-chia^{3}.)

After 1900, they began to be replaced by less autonomous cunzheng, (Note: Chinese: 村正; pinyin: cūnzhèng; Wade–Giles: ts'un^{1}-cheng^{4}; lit. 'village head'.) although this transition was not completed until the Republican era.

== See also ==
- village (China)
- village head
- notary public
