= 2000 Chinese census =

2000 census of the population of China

Fifth National Census
- 1 November 2000

General information
- Country: China

Results
- Total population: 1,245,110,826 (▲9.8%)
- Most populous province: Henan; 91,236,854
- Least populous province: Tibet Autonomous Region; 2,616,329

The 2000 Chinese census, officially the Fifth National Population Census of the People's Republic of China (Chinese: 中华人民共和国第五次全国人口普查), was conducted by the government of the People's Republic of China with 1 November 2000 as its zero hour. The total population was calculated as 1,295,330,000. (Note: This figure includes the islands of Taiwan, Penghu, Kinmen, Matsu, and others administered by the Republic of China, as well as the special administrative regions of Hong Kong and Macau. However, the population of the area administered by India as part of Arunachal Pradesh but claimed by China as South Tibet was not mentioned in the official report.) The census also covered population growth, number of households, sex, age, ethnicity, educational attainment, and urban and rural population. (Note: These seven topics were only calculated for the 31 province-level divisions of mainland China and for active-duty soldiers. (Number of households and urban/rural population do not include active-duty soldiers.))

The census did not include the special administrative regions of Hong Kong and Macau.

== Population by province-level division ==
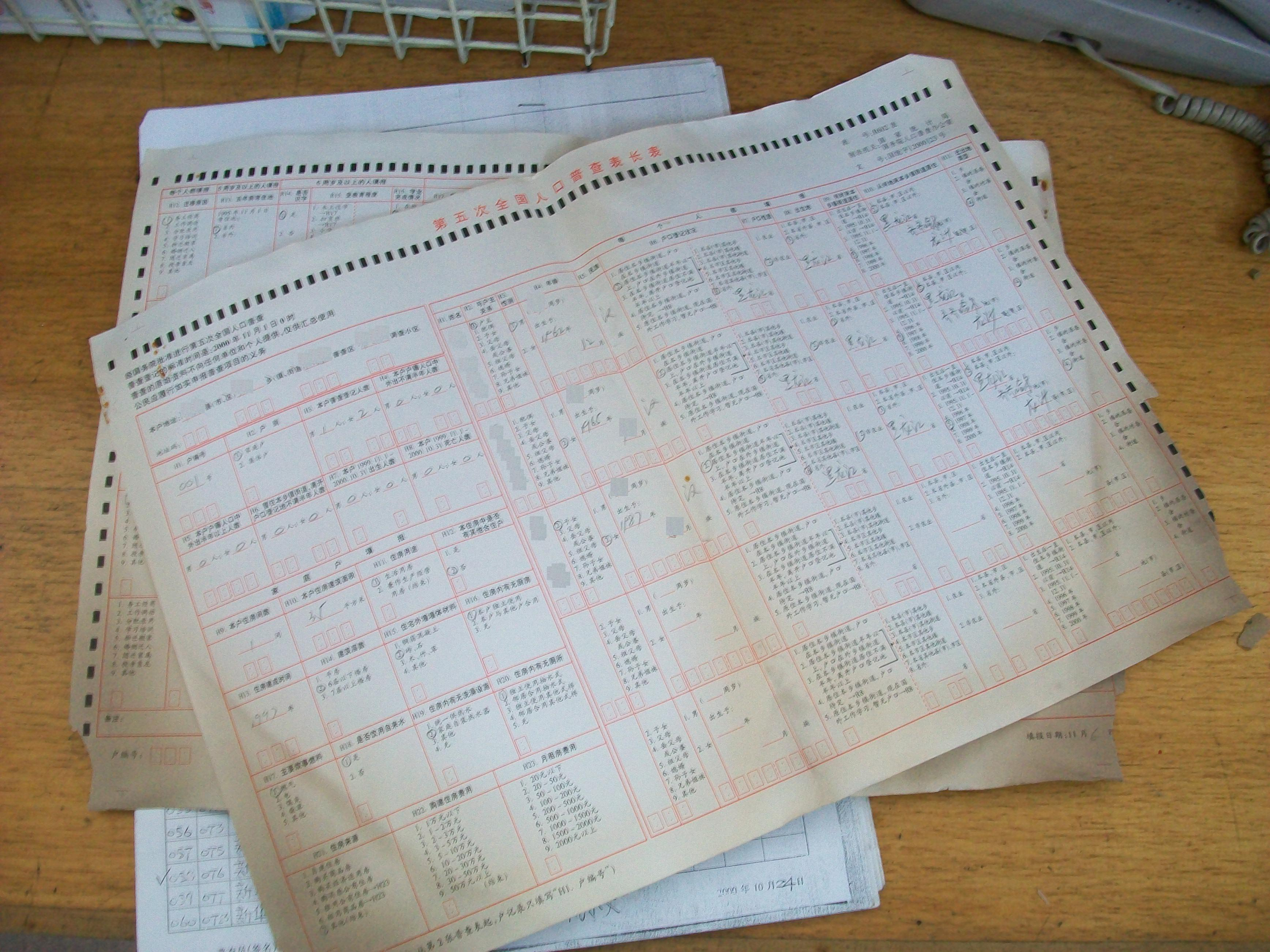
Fifth National Census long form

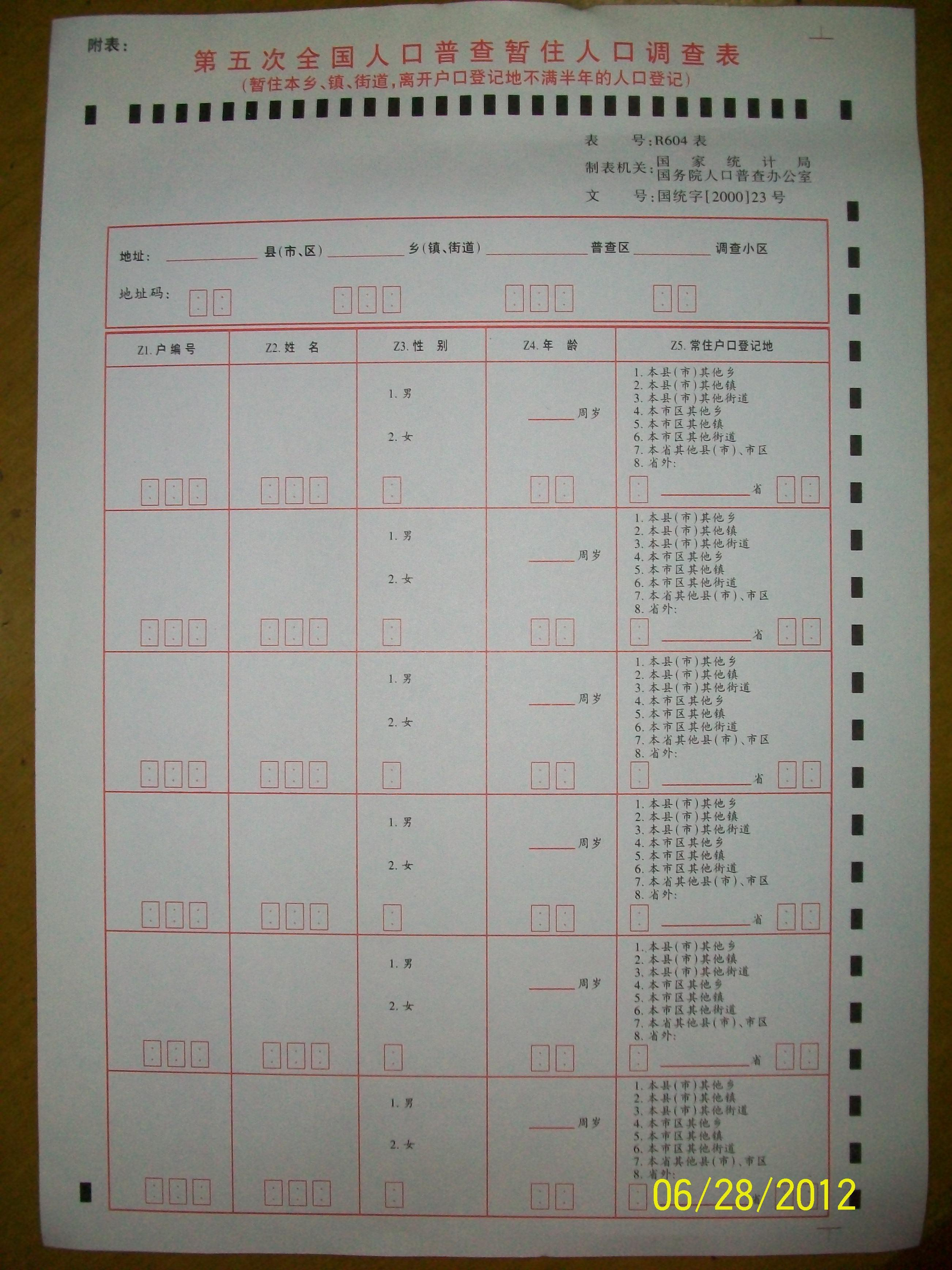
Fifth National Census temporary residence form

Based on the results of the Fifth National Population Census, Henan was the most populous province-level division, Shandong was ranked second, Guangdong and Sichuan were third and fourth, and Jiangsu, Hebei, Hunan, Hubei, Anhui, and Zhejiang were ranked fifth through tenth. Hainan, Ningxia, Qinghai, and Tibet were the four least populous, with fewer than 10 million people each. Tibet was the least populous of all, with 2,620,000 people.

There were nine province-level divisions with more than 50 million people, eighteen with 10–50 million people, and four with less than 10 million people.

=== More than 50 million ===
- Henan Province and Shandong Province had more than 90 million people.
- Guangdong Province and Sichuan Province had more than 80 million people.
- Jiangsu Province had more than 70 million people.
- Hebei Province, Hunan Province, and Hubei Province had more than 60 million people.
- Anhui Province had more than 50 million people.

=== 10–50 million ===
- Zhejiang Province, Guangxi Zhuang Autonomous Region, Yunnan Province, Liaoning Province, and Jiangxi Province had more than 40 million people.
- Heilongjiang Province, Shaanxi Province, Guizhou Province, Fujian Province, Shanxi Province, and Chongqing Municipality had more than 30 million people.
- Jilin Province, Gansu Province, and Inner Mongolia Autonomous Region had more than 20 million people.
- Xinjiang Uyghur Autonomous Region, Shanghai Municipality, Beijing Municipality, and Tianjin Municipality had more than 10 million people.

=== Less than 10 million ===
- Hainan Province, Ningxia Hui Autonomous Region, and Qinghai Province had more than 5 million people.
- Tibet Autonomous Region was the least populous province, with a population of 2,620,000.

=== List of province-level divisions by population ===
Fifth National Census population by province-level division (revised data; unit: 10,000 people)
Rank	Administrative region	Population	Percentage of total population	Han	Percentage of total Han population	Percentage of region's population	Minority	Percentage of total ethnic minority population	Percentage of region's population
	Total (mainland China)	126,583	100	115,940	100	91.59	10,643	100	8.41
1	Henan	9,256	7.31	9,143	7.89	98.78	113	1.06	1.22
2	Shandong	9,079	7.17	9,017	7.78	99.32	62	0.58	0.68
3	Guangdong	8,642	6.83	8,519	7.35	98.58	123	1.16	1.42
4	Sichuan	8,329	6.58	7,914	6.83	95.02	415	3.90	4.98
5	Jiangsu	7,438	5.88	7,413	6.39	99.67	25	0.23	0.33
6	Hebei	6,744	5.33	6,453	5.57	95.69	291	2.73	4.31
7	Hunan	6,440	5.09	5,782	4.99	89.79	658	6.18	10.21
8	Hubei	6,028	4.76	5,766	4.97	95.66	262	2.46	4.34
9	Anhui	5,986	4.73	5,948	5.13	99.37	38	0.36	0.63
10	Zhejiang	4,677	3.69	4,637	4.00	99.15	40	0.38	0.85
11	Guangxi	4,489	3.55	2,768	2.39	61.66	1,721	16.17	38.34
12	Yunnan	4,288	3.39	2,855	2.46	66.59	1,433	13.46	33.41
13	Liaoning	4,238	3.35	3,560	3.07	83.98	678	6.37	16.02
14	Jiangxi	4,140	3.27	4,129	3.56	99.73	11	0.10	0.27
15	Heilongjiang	3,689	2.91	3,504	3.02	94.98	185	1.74	5.02
16	Shaanxi	3,605	2.85	3,587	3.09	99.51	18	0.17	0.49
17	Guizhou	3,525	2.78	2,191	1.89	62.15	1,334	12.53	37.85
18	Fujian	3,471	2.74	3,413	2.94	98.33	58	0.54	1.67
19	Shanxi	3,297	2.60	3,287	2.84	99.71	10	0.09	0.29
20	Chongqing	3,090	2.44	2,892	2.49	93.58	198	1.86	6.42
21	Jilin	2,728	2.16	2,482	2.14	90.97	246	2.31	9.03
22	Gansu	2,562	2.02	2,339	2.02	91.31	223	2.10	8.69
23	Inner Mongolia	2,376	1.88	1,883	1.62	79.24	493	4.63	20.76
24	Xinjiang	1,925	1.52	782	0.67	40.61	1,143	10.74	59.39
25	Shanghai	1,674	1.32	1,664	1.44	99.40	10	0.09	0.6
26	Beijing	1,382	1.09	1,323	1.14	95.74	59	0.55	4.26
27	Tianjin	1,001	0.79	975	0.84	97.36	26	0.24	2.64
28	Hainan	787	0.62	651	0.56	82.71	136	1.28	17.29
29	Ningxia	562	0.44	368	0.32	65.47	194	1.82	34.53
30	Qinghai	518	0.41	282	0.24	54.49	236	2.22	45.51
31	Tibet	262	0.21	16	0.01	5.93	246	2.31	94.07
	Active-duty military	250	0.20	239	0.21	95.53	11	0.10	4.47
Including Hong Kong, Macau, and Taiwan, the total population was 1,295,330,000, including: ·Population of Hong Kong: 7,110,000 ·Population of Macau: 440,000 ·Population of Taiwan: 22,280,000

=== Distribution of ethnic minorities ===
There were four province-level divisions with an ethnic minority population of more than 10 million: in decreasing order, Guangxi, Yunnan, Guizhou, and Xinjiang. There were two more provinces, Liaoning and Hunan, with an ethnic minority population of more than 5 million. Fourteen more, including Inner Mongolia and Sichuan, had an ethnic minority population of more than 1 million. Three more (Shandong, Beijing, and Fujian) had more than 500,000, while the remaining eight had more than 100,000 each.

There were 13 province-level divisions where the proportion of ethnic minorities was higher than the national average. In Tibet and Xinjiang more than 50% of the population belonged to ethnic minorities: 93.94% in Tibet and 59.43% in Xinjiang. In Qinghai, Guangxi, Guizhou, Ningxia, and Yunnan the ethnic minority population was greater than 30%. In Inner Mongolia it was 20.83%. In Hainan, Liaoning, and Hunan it was more than 10%, and in Jilin and Gansu it was also greater than the nationwide proportion of 8.41%.

==== Absolute population of ethnic minorities ====
- Guangxi, Yunnan, Guizhou, and Xinjiang had the highest numbers of ethnic minorities, more than 10 million each.
- Liaoning and Hunan had more than 5 million.
- Inner Mongolia and Sichuan had more than 4 million.
- Hebei, Hubei, Jilin, Tibet, Qinghai, and Gansu had more than 2 million.
- Chongqing, Ningxia, Heilongjiang, Hainan, Guangdong, and Henan had more than 1 million. The remaining 11 province-level divisions had an ethnic minority population of less than 1 million.

==== Proportion of ethnic minorities ====
- Tibet and Xinjiang had the highest concentration of ethnic minorities, representing 94.07% and 59.39% of the population respectively, followed by Qinghai where they were 45.51% of the population.
- Guangxi, Guizhou, Ningxia, and Yunnan had more than 30% ethnic minorities.
- Inner Mongolia's population was 20.76% minority, while Hainan, Liaoning, and Hunan were over 10%.
- Jilin, Gansu, Chongqing, and Heilongjiang were over 5%.
- Sichuan, Hubei, Hebei, and Beijing were over 4%.
- Tianjin, Fujian, Guangdong, and Henan were between 1% and 3%, while the remaining eight province-level divisions were less than 1% ethnic minority.

==== List of regions and ethnic minority population ====
Distribution of ethnic minorities in the Fifth National Census
Rank	Administrative region	Total population	Region's population as a percentage of total	Ethnic minority population	Ethnic minorities as a percentage of region's population	Percentage of total ethnic minority population
	Total	1,245,110,826	100	105,337,818	8.46	100
	Total (31 regions)	1,242,612,226	99.80	105,226,114	8.47	99.89
	East China	358,849,244	28.82	2,499,256	0.70	2.37
	South China	350,658,477	28.16	29,563,571	8.43	28.07
	Southwest China	193,085,172	15.51	36,044,788	18.67	34.22
	North China	145,896,933	11.72	8,716,190	5.97	8.27
	Northeast China	104,864,179	8.42	10,944,334	10.44	10.39
	Northwest China	89,258,221	7.17	17,457,975	19.56	16.57
1	Henan	91,236,854	7.33	1,143,568	1.25	1.09
2	Shandong	89,971,789	7.23	632,743	0.70	0.60
3	Guangdong	85,225,007	6.84	1,269,137	1.49	1.20
4	Sichuan	82,348,296	6.61	4,118,599	5.00	3.91
5	Jiangsu	73,043,577	5.87	259,903	0.36	0.25
6	Hebei	66,684,419	5.36	2,902,816	4.35	2.76
7	Hunan	63,274,173	5.08	6,410,694	10.13	6.09
8	Hubei	59,508,870	4.78	2,596,902	4.36	2.47
9	Anhui	58,999,948	4.74	397,836	0.67	0.38
10	Zhejiang	45,930,651	3.69	395,385	0.86	0.38
11	Guangxi	43,854,538	3.52	16,829,564	38.38	15.98
12	Yunnan	42,360,089	3.40	14,158,815	33.42	13.44
13	Liaoning	41,824,412	3.36	6,718,421	16.06	6.38
14	Jiangxi	40,397,598	3.24	125,717	0.31	0.12
15	Heilongjiang	36,237,576	2.91	1,772,537	4.89	1.68
16	Shaanxi	35,365,072	2.84	176,421	0.50	0.17
17	Guizhou	35,247,695	2.83	13,336,008	37.84	12.66
18	Fujian	34,097,947	2.74	583,800	1.71	0.55
19	Shanxi	32,471,242	2.61	103,159	0.32	0.10
20	Chongqing	30,512,763	2.45	1,973,607	6.47	1.87
21	Jilin	26,802,191	2.15	2,453,376	9.15	2.33
22	Gansu	25,124,282	2.02	2,199,219	8.75	2.09
23	Inner Mongolia	23,323,347	1.87	4,857,761	20.83	4.61
24	Xinjiang	18,459,511	1.48	10,969,592	59.43	10.41
25	Shanghai	16,407,734	1.32	103,872	0.63	0.10
26	Beijing	13,569,194	1.09	585,498	4.31	0.56
27	Tianjin	9,848,731	0.79	266,956	2.71	0.25
28	Hainan	7,559,035	0.61	1,313,706	17.38	1.25
29	Ningxia	5,486,393	0.44	1,895,830	34.56	1.80
30	Qinghai	4,822,963	0.39	2,216,913	45.97	2.10
31	Tibet	2,616,329	0.21	2,457,759	93.94	2.33
	Active-duty military	2,498,600	0.20	111,704	4.47	0.11

== Ethnicity ==
The Han Chinese population had increased by 11.22% since the 1990 census, going from 91.96% of the population to 91.59%. The ethnic minority population had increased by 16.70% since the 1990 census, going from 8.04% of the population to 8.41%. The ethnic minority population grew at a higher rate than the Han population due to affirmative action under the one-child policy.

After Han, the second most populous ethnic group was the Zhuang, followed by the Manchus, each of which had more than 10 million people, and the Hui with 9,817,000 people. There were more than 8 million Miao, Uyghurs, and Tujia; 7,762,000 Yi; more than 5 million Mongols and Tibetans; more than 1 million but less than 3 million of each of nine ethnic groups including the Buyi, Dong, Koreans, and Kazakhs; more than 100,000 but less than 1 million of each of 17 ethnic groups including the She, Lisu, and Kyrgyz; and more than 10,000 but less than 100,000 of each of 13 ethnic groups including the Blang and Tajiks. Seven other ethnic groups, including the Moinba, Oroqen, and Drung, had a population of less than 10,000 each; among them, the Tatars, Hezhe, indigenous Taiwanese, and Lhoba had less than 50,000 each. The least populous ethnic group was the Lhoba, with only 2,965 people. There were 734,438 people belonging to unrecognized ethnic groups, including 710,486 in Guizhou (96.74% of the total), 7,404 in Yunnan (1.01%), and more than 1,000 in each of Tibet, Zhejiang, Guangdong, Guangxi, and Jiangsu.

Ethnicities on the Fifth National Census
	Ethnicity	Population	As a percentage of total population	31 administrative regions	Active-duty soldiers (Note: Active-duty soldiers of the People's Liberation Army.)
	Total	1,245,110,826	100	1,242,612,226	2,498,600
1	Han	1,139,773,008	91.59	1,137,386,112	2,386,896
2	Zhuang	16,187,163	1.30	16,178,811	8,352
3	Manchu	10,708,464	0.86	10,682,262	26,202
4	Hui	9,828,126	0.79	9,816,805	11,321
5	Miao	8,945,538	0.72	8,940,116	5,422
6	Uyghur	8,405,416	0.68	8,399,393	6,023
7	Tujia	8,037,014	0.65	8,028,133	8,881
8	Yi	7,765,858	0.62	7,762,272	3,586
9	Mongol	5,827,808	0.47	5,813,947	13,861
10	Tibetan	5,422,954	0.44	5,416,021	6,933
11	Buyi	2,973,217	0.24	2,971,460	1,757
12	Dong	2,962,911	0.24	2,960,293	2,618
13	Yao	2,638,878	0.21	2,637,421	1,457
14	Korean	1,929,696	0.16	1,923,842	5,854
15	Bai	1,861,895	0.15	1,858,063	3,832
16	Hani	1,440,029	0.12	1,439,673	356
17	Kazakh	1,251,023	0.10	1,250,458	565
18	Li	1,248,022	0.10	1,247,814	208
19	Dai	1,159,231	0.093	1,158,989	242
20	She	710,039	0.057	709,592	447
21	Lisu	635,101	0.051	634,912	189
22	Gelao	579,744	0.047	579,357	387
23	Dongxiang	513,826	0.041	513,805	21
24	Lahu	453,765	0.036	453,705	60
25	Shui	407,000	0.033	406,902	98
26	Wa	396,709	0.032	396,610	99
27	Naxi	309,477	0.025	308,839	638
28	Qiang	306,476	0.025	306,072	404
29	Tu	241,593	0.019	241,198	395
30	Mulao	207,464	0.017	207,352	112
31	Sibe	189,357	0.015	188,824	533
32	Kyrgyz	160,875	0.013	160,823	52
33	Daur	132,747	0.011	132,394	353
34	Jingpo	132,158	0.011	132,143	15
35	Maonan	107,184	0.0086	107,166	18
36	Salar	104,521	0.0084	104,503	18
37	Blang	91,891	0.0074	91,882	9
38	Tajik	41,056	0.0033	41,028	28
39	Achang	33,954	0.0027	33,936	18
40	Pumi	33,628	0.0027	33,600	28
41	Evenk	30,545	0.0025	30,505	40
42	Nu	28,770	0.0023	28,759	11
43	Vietnamese (Jing)	22,584	0.0018	22,517	67
44	Jino	20,899	0.0017	20,899	
45	De'ang	17,935	0.0014	17,935	
46	Bonan	16,505	0.0013	16,505	
47	Russian	15,631	0.0013	15,609	22
48	Yugur	13,747	0.0011	13,719	28
49	Uzbek	12,423	0.0010	12,370	53
50	Moinba	8,928	0.0007	8,923	5
51	Oroqen	8,216	0.0007	8,196	20
52	Drung	7,431	0.0006	7,426	5
53	Tatar	4,895	0.0004	4,890	5
54	Hezhe	4,664	0.0004	4,640	24
55	Indigenous Taiwanese (Gaoshan)	4,488	0.0004	4,461	27
56	Lhoba	2,970	0.0002	2,965	5
	Unrecognized ethnic groups	734,438	0.0590	734,438	
	Naturalized Chinese citizens	941	0.0001	941	

== Key indices ==
=== Population growth ===
The population had increased by 132,150,000 (11.66%) over the population of 1,133,680,000 from the Fourth National Census on 1 July 1990. The average rate of population growth per year was 1.07%.

=== Households ===
There were 348,370,000 households, with 1,198,390,000 people. The average household size was 3.44 people, a decrease of 0.52 from the 1990 average household size of 3.96.

=== Sex ===
There were 653,550,000 males (51.63% of the population) and 612,280,000 females (48.37%). The sex ratio was 106.74 men for every 100 women.

=== Age ===
There were 289,790,000 children aged 0-14, representing 22.89% of the population; 887,930,000 people aged 15–64, representing 70.15% of the population; and 88,110,000 people aged 65 and older, representing 6.96% of the population. The proportion of people 14 and under had decreased by 4.8% since the 1990 census, and the proportion of people 65 and over had increased by 1.39%.

=== Educational attainment ===
Among the population, 45,710,000 people had attended higher education; 141,090,000 people had attended high school (including vocational high school); 429,890,000 had attended middle school; and 451,910,000 had attended elementary school. (These figures include people who completed the level of education indicated, people who failed to complete it, and current students.)

In comparison with the 1990 census, the following changes happened (per 100,000 people):

- People with higher education increased from 1,422 to 3,611.
- People with high school education increased from 8,039 to 11,146.
- People with middle school education increased from 23,344 to 33,961.
- People with only elementary school education decreased from 37,057 to 35,701.

The illiteracy rate (people age 15 and above who are unable to read or can only read very little) was 85,070,000 people. The illiteracy rate had decreased from 15.88% in 1990 to 6.72% in 2000, a decrease of 9.16 percentage points.

Educational attainment (age 15+)
Level of education	2000 census	
Level of education	Population	%
None	84,297,682	8.8
Literacy class (扫盲班)	20,767,294	2.2
Elementary school (小学)	291,102,294	30.4
Middle school (初中)	380,276,707	39.7
High school (高中)	98,548,414	10.3
Vocational secondary school (中专)	39,073,590	4.1
Vocational college (专科)	28,984,109	3.0
Bachelor's degree (本科)	14,150,609	1.5
Graduate school (研究生)	883,933	0.1
Total	958,084,632	
Illiteracy rate	86,992,069	9.1

=== Urban and rural population ===
The urban population was 455,940,000 (36.09%), and the rural population was 807,390,000 (63.91%). The urban population had increased by 9.86% since 1990.

== Analysis ==
The 2000 census counted people according to their hukou rather than their location of actual residence. Experts believe that it may have underestimated the proportion of the population living in urban areas.

== See also ==
- National Population Census of the People's Republic of China
  - Fourth National Population Census of the People's Republic of China (1990)
  - Sixth National Population Census of the People's Republic of China (2010)
