= 1953 Chinese census =

1953 census of the population of China

First National Census
- 30 June 1953

General information
- Country: China

Results
- Total population: 582,603,417
- Most populous province: Henan
- Least populous province: Tibet Autonomous Region

The 1953 Chinese census, officially the First National Population Census of the People's Republic of China, was conducted by the People's Republic of China starting on June 30, 1953. The results were summarized in Chinese newspapers on November 1, 1954. As the full results were not published, they had to subsequently be assembled from Soviet sources over the next five years.

== Results ==
=== Total population ===
The official summaries listed the total population of mainland China in 1953 as 582,603,417.

=== Demographics ===
13.26% of the population (77,257,282 persons) were listed as residing in urban areas comprising 163 cities, (Note: Chinese: 市, p shì. (103 locations with a population greater than 100,000 and 60 others considered to be major economic centers.)) industrial and mining districts, (Note: t 工礦處, s 工矿处, p gōngkuàngchù, w kung-k'uang ch'ü.) and about 1450 towns. (Note: t 鎭, s 镇, p zhèn, w chen.) Of the urban population, roughly 1 in 12 resided in Shanghai.

=== Distribution ===
City	Province/Municipality/Region/Autonomous Region	Population 1953 Census	Population previous estimates	Numerical Change	Relative Change
Huainan	Anhui	286,900	—	—	—
Bengbu	Anhui	253,000	201,000	▲52,000	25.87%
Wuhu	Anhui	242,100	204,000	▲38,100	18.68%
Hefei	Anhui	183,600	70,000	▲113,600	162.3%
Anqing	Anhui	105,300	121,000	▼15,700	-12.98%
Tunxi	Anhui	>50,000	—	—	—
Hangzhou	Zhejiang	696,600	518,000	▲178,600	34.48%
Ningbo	Zhejiang	237,500	210,000	▲27,500	13.10%
Wenzhou	Zhejiang	201,600	157,000	▲44,600	28.41%
Shaoxing	Zhejiang	130,600	93,000	▲37,600	40.43%
Jiaxing	Zhejiang	78,300	53,000	▲25,300	47.7%
Huzhou	Zhejiang	62,700	45,000	▲17,700	39.3%
Jinhua	Zhejiang	46,200	23,000	▲23,200	101%
Fuzhou	Fujian	553,000	331,000	▲222,000	67.1%
Xiamen	Fujian	224,300	158,000	▲66,300	41.96%
Quanzhou	Fujian	107,700	121,000	▼13,300	-10.99%
Zhangzhou	Fujian	81,200	62,000	▲19,200	31.0%
Harbin	Municipality of Harbin	1,163,000	760,000	▲403,000	53.03%
Qiqihar	Heilongjiang	344,700	175,000	▲169,700	96.97%
Mudanjiang	Songjiang	151,400	200,000	▼48,600	-24.3%
Jiamusi	Songjiang	146,000	168,000	▼18,000	-10.7%
Hegang	Songjiang	90,000	—	—	—
Zhengzhou	Henan	594,700	197,000	▲397,700	201.9%
Kaifeng	Henan	299,100	303,000	▼3,900	-1.29%
Luoyang	Henan	171,200	77,000	▲94,200	122.3%
Xinxiang	Henan	170,500	—	—	—
Shangqiu	Henan	134,400	70,000	▲64,400	92.0%
Anyang	Henan	124,900	60,000	▲64,900	108.2%
Zhoukou	Henan	85,500	200,000	▼114,500	-57.3%
Xuchang	Henan	58,000	50,000	▲8,000	16.0%
Nanyang	Henan	>50,000	50,000	—	—
Xinyang	Henan	>50,000	—	—	—
Zhumadian	Henan	<50,000	—	—	—
Luohe	Henan	<50,000	—	—	—
Beijing	Municipality of Beijing	2,768,149	1,603,000	▲1,165,000	72.68%
Tianjin	Municipality of Tianjin	2,693,831	1,687,000	▲1,007,000	59.69%
Tangshan	Hebei	693,300	137,000	▲556,300	406.1%
Shijiazhuang	Hebei	373,400	125,000	▲248,400	198.7%
Zhangjiakou	Hebei	229,300	151,000	▲78,300	51.85%
Baoding	Hebei	197,000	130,000	▲67,000	51.5%
Qinhuangdao	Hebei	186,800	100,000	▲86,800	86.80%
Xuanhua City	Hebei	114,100	—	—	—
Chengde	Rehe	92,900	60,000	▲32,900	54.8%
Hangu City	Municipality of Tianjin	>50,000	—	—	—
Handan	Hebei	>50,000	—	—	—
Botou（Cangzhou）	Hebei	>50,000	—	—	—
Xingtai	Hebei	>50,000	—	—	—
Tongzhou	Hebei	>50,000	—	—	—
Changsha	Hunan	650,600	396,000	▲254,600	64.29%
Hengyang	Hunan	235,000	181,000	▲54,000	29.8%
Xiangtan	Hunan	183,600	83,000	▲100,600	121.2%
Zhuzhou	Hunan	127,300	—	—	—
Shaoyang	Hunan	117,700	76,000	▲41,700	54.87%
Changde	Hunan	94,800	50,000	▲44,800	89.6%
Jinshi（Changde）	Hunan	>50,000	58,000	—	—
Yiyang	Hunan	>50,000	80,000	—	—
Hongjiang	Hunan	<50,000	—	—	—
Wuhan	Municipality of Wuhan	1,427,300	1,100,000	▲327,300	29.73%
Huangshi	Hubei	110,500	—	—	—
Shashi City	Hubei	85,800	114,000	▼28,200	-24.7%
Xiangfan	Hubei	73,300	66,000	▲7,300	11.1%
Yichang	Hubei	>50,000	81,000	—	—
Baotou	Suiyuan	149,400	82,000	▲67,400	82.2%
Guisui	Suiyuan	148,400	110,000	▲38,400	34.9%
Ulanhot（Hinggan League）	Inner Mongolia Autonomous Region	51,400	—	—	—
Hailar（Hulunbuir Nunmoron League）	Inner Mongolia Autonomous Region	43,200	16,000	▲27,200	170%
Manzhouli（Hulunbuir Nunmoron League）	Inner Mongolia Autonomous Region	<50,000	—	—	—
Tongliao（Jirem League）	Inner Mongolia Autonomous Region	<50,000	—	—	—
Lanzhou	Gansu	387,400	156,000	▲231,400	148.3%
Tianshui	Gansu	63,000	50,000	▲13,000	26%
Linxia City	Gansu	>50,000	—	—	—
Pingliang	Gansu	>50,000	55,000	—	—
Nanchang	Jiangxi	398,200	267,000	▲131,200	49.1%
Ganzhou	Jiangxi	98,600	59,000	▲39,600	67.1%
Jingdezhen	Jiangxi	92,000	87,000	▲5,000	5.7%
Jiujiang	Jiangxi	64,600	121,000	▼56,400	-46.6%
Ji'an	Jiangxi	52,800	69,000	▼16,200	-23.5%
Shangrao	Jiangxi	>50,000	31,000	—	—
Shanghai	Municipality of Shanghai	6,204,417	4,300,000	▲1,900,000	44.2%
Nanjing	Jiangsu	1,091,600	1,137,000	▼45,400	-3.99%
Wuxi	Jiangsu	581,500	273,000	▲308,500	113.0%
Suzhou	Jiangsu	474,000	381,000	▲93,000	24.4%
Xuzhou	Jiangsu	373,200	340,000	▲33,200	9.76%
Changzhou	Jiangsu	296,500	125,000	▲171,500	137.2%
Nantong	Jiangsu	260,400	133,000	▲127,400	95.79%
Xinhailian	Jiangsu	207,600	48,000	▲159,600	332.5%
Zhenjiang	Jiangsu	201,400	179,000	▲22,400	12.5%
Yangzhou	Jiangsu	180,200	127,000	▲53,200	41.9%
Taizhou	Jiangsu	159,800	131,000	▲28,800	22.0%
Changshu	Jiangsu	101,400	64,000	▲37,400	58.4%
Qingjiang	Jiangsu	77,000	47,000	▲30,000	65%
Changchun	Municipality of Changchun	855,200	630,000	▲225,200	35.75%
Jilin	Jilin	435,400	247,000	▲188,400	76.28%
Tonghua	Liaodong	129,100	80,000	▲49,100	61.4%
Siping	Liaoxi	125,900	76,000	▲49,900	65.7%
Liaoyuan	Liaodong	120,100	—	—	—
Yanji（Yanbian Korean Autonomous Prefecture）	Jilin	70,000	43,000	▲37,000	86%
Nanning	Guangxi	194,900	203,000	▼8,100	-4.0%
Liuzhou	Guangxi	158,800	208,000	▼49,200	-23.65%
Guilin	Guangxi	145,100	142,000	▲3,100	2.18%
Wuzhou	Guangxi	110,800	207,000	▼96,200	-46.5%
Guangzhou	Municipality of Guangzhou	1,598,900	1,413,000	▲185,900	13.16%
Shantou	Guangdong	280,400	215,000	▲65,400	30.4%
Zhanjiang	Guangdong	166,000	268,000	▼102,000	-38.1%
Haikou	Guangdong	135,300	60,000	▲75,300	126%
Foshan	Guangdong	122,500	96,000	▲26,500	27.6%
Chaozhou	Guangdong	101,300	59,000	▲42,300	71.7%
Jiangmen	Guangdong	85,000	50,000	▲35,000	70%
Shaoguan	Guangdong	81,700	73,000	▲8,700	11.9%
Beihai	Guangxi	>50,000	36,000	—	—
Guiyang	Guizhou	270,900	240,000	▲30,900	12.9%
Zunyi	Guizhou	97,500	66,000	▲31,500	47.7%
Shenyang	Municipality of Shenyang	2,299,900	1,121,000	▲1,178,900	105.1%
Dalian	Municipality of Lüda	766,400	544,000	▲222,400	40.88%
Fushun	Municipality of Fushun	678,600	280,000	▲398,600	142.4%
Anshan	Municipality of Anshan	548,900	166,000	▲382,900	230.7%
Benxi	Municipality of Benxi	449,000	98,000	▲351,000	358%
Andong	Liaodong	360,000	271,000	▲89,000	32.8%
Jinzhou	Liaoxi	352,200	148,000	▲104,200	70.4%
Fuxin	Liaoxi	188,600	166,000	▲22,600	13.6%
Yingkou	Liaodong	131,400	159,000	▼27,600	-17.4%
Lüshun	Municipality of Lüda	126,000	27,000	▲99,000	367%
Liaoyang	Liaodong	>100,000	102,000	—	—
Yinchuan	Ningxia	84,000	41,000	▲43,000	105%
Wuzhong	Ningxia	<50,000	—	—	—
Taiyuan	Shanxi	720,700	252,000	▲468,700	186.0%
Datong	Shanxi	228,500	80,000	▲148,500	185.6%
Yangquan	Shanxi	177,400	—	—	—
Changzhi	Shanxi	97,800	—	—	—
Yuci	Shanxi	60,000	—	—	—
Qingdao	Shandong	916,800	788,000	▲128,800	16.35%
Jinan	Shandong	680,100	575,000	▲105,100	18.3%
Zibo	Shandong	184,200	—	—	—
Weifang	Shandong	148,900	—	—	—
Jining	Shandong	86,200	150,000	▼63,800	-42.5%
Zhangzhou	Shandong	>50,000	—	—	—
Linqing（Liaocheng）	Shandong	<50,000	50,000	—	—
Dezhou	Shandong	<50,000	—	—	—
Weihai	Shandong	<50,000	175,000	—	—
Xi'an	Municipality of Xi'an	787,300	503,000	▲284,300	56.52%
Baoji	Shaanxi	130,100	56,000	▲84,100	150%
Hanzhong	Shaanxi	>50,000	59,000	—	—
Xianyang	Shaanxi	>50,000	16,000	—	—
Dihua	Xinjiang	140,700	70,000	▲70,700	101%
Qulja	Xinjiang	108,200	—	—	—
Kashgar	Xinjiang	91,000	50,000	▲41,000	82%
Chongqing	Municipality of Chongqing	1,772,500	1,000,000	▲772,500	77.3%
Chengdu	Sichuan	856,700	648,000	▲208,700	32.21%
Zigong	Sichuan	291,300	223,000	▲68,300	30.6%
Luzhou	Sichuan	289,000	50,000	▲239,000	478%
Wutongqiao City	Sichuan	199,100	—	—	—
Neijiang	Sichuan	190,200	32,000	▲158,200	494%
Yibin	Sichuan	177,500	80,000	▲97,500	121.9%
Nanchong	Sichuan	164,700	60,000	▲104,700	174.5%
Beibei	Municipality of Chongqing	>100,000	—	—	—
Ya'an	Xikang	55,200	—	—	—
Wanxian	Sichuan	>50,000	110,000	—	—
Hechuan	Sichuan	>50,000	40,000	—	—
Lhasa	Tibet Region	50,000	—	—	—
Xining	Qinghai	93,700	59,000	▲34,700	58.8%
Kunming	Yunnan	698,900	300,000	▲398,900	133.0%
Gejiu	Yunnan	159,700	16,000	▲143,700	898%
Xiaguan City	Yunnan	26,200	—	—	—

== Controversy ==
China had never previously had an official national census in the modern period and estimates of its population even in 1911 varied between 200,000,000 and 400,000,000. Mistrust of PRC statistics that saw the number of cities go from 60 under the Nationalist government to 103 within four years and that involved "indirectly survey[ing]" several areas including Tibet led some Western academics like George Cressey to claim, "These inflated figures are designed to impress the world with China's strength, to support claims for a falling death rate, or to supply an excuse for food shortages."

== See also ==
- Demographics of China
- Urbanization in China
- Census in China
