= 1990 Chinese census =

1990 census of the population of China

Fourth National Census
- July 1990

General information
- Country: China

Results
- Total population: 1,133,683,417
- Most populous province: Sichuan
- Least populous province: Tibet Autonomous Region

The 1990 Chinese census, officially the Fourth National Population Census of the People's Republic of China, was conducted by the National Bureau of Statistics of the People's Republic of China. Based on the fourth census of July 1990, mainland China's population was estimated to be 1.133 billion. Among them, the Han Chinese had a population of 1.042 billion (94% of overall population).

== See also ==
- Census in China
