= 2010 Chinese census =

2010 census of the population of China

Sixth National Population Census
- 28 April 2011

General information
- Country: China

Results
- Total population: 1,339,724,852 (▲7.6%)
- Most populous province: Guangdong
- Least populous province: Tibet Autonomous Region

The 2010 Chinese census, officially the Sixth National Population Census of the People's Republic of China (中华人民共和国第六次全国人口普查), was conducted by the National Bureau of Statistics of the People's Republic of China with a zero hour of November 1, 2010.

== Census procedure ==
Census procedure was governed by the Regulations on National Population Census and the Circular of the State Council on the Conduct of the 6th National Population Census. The census cost 700 million RMB.

== Results ==
The main findings of the census were published on April 28, 2011.

=== Total population ===
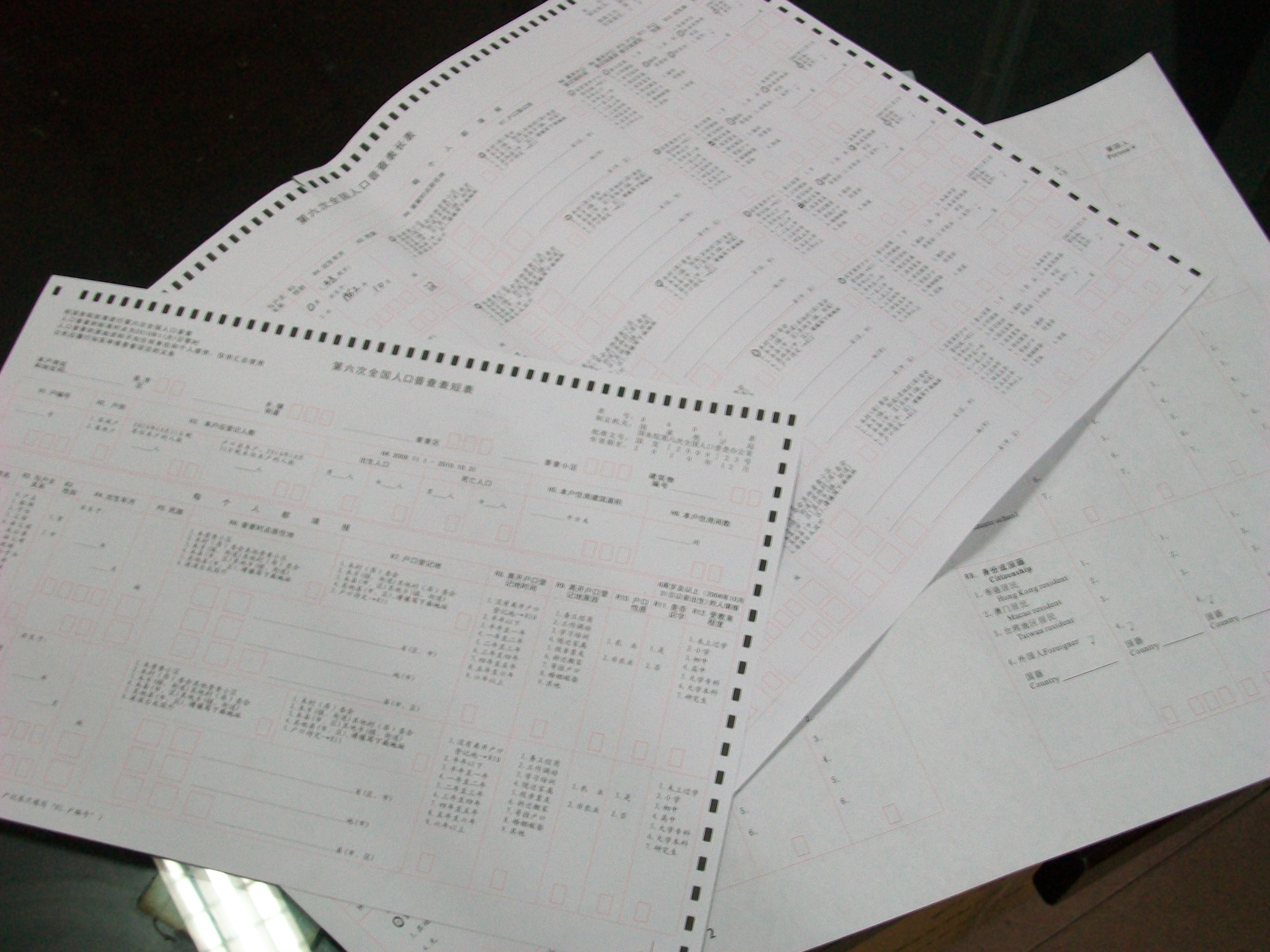
Some of the forms used to collect census data

It found the total population of Mainland China to be 1,339,724,852 persons, an increase of 73,899,804 persons from the previous census conducted in 2000. This represented a growth rate of 5.84% over the decade, and an average annual growth rate of 0.57%. The population undercount rate of the census was estimated at 0.12%. The census also listed the population of Hong Kong Special Administrative Region as 7,097,600 persons, the population of Macau Special Administrative Region as 552,300 persons, and the population of Taiwan as 23,162,123 persons.

=== Population composition and demographics ===
The census found a total of 401,517,330 family households in Mainland China, with an average of 3.10 persons per household, a decrease of 0.34 persons from the 2000 census. 51.27% of the population is male, and 48.73% is female, giving a male to female ratio of 105.20 men for every 100 women, a decrease from the 2000 figure of 106.74. 49.68% of the population resided in urban areas, and 50.32% resided in rural areas, an increase of 13.46% in the proportion of the urban population. 261,386,075 people had lived in a place different from their household registration for at least six months, with 221,426,652 of these living in a different city from their registration.

According to the 2010 census, males account for 51.27% of China's 1.34 billion people, while females made up 48.73% of the total. The sex ratio (the number of males for each female in a population) at birth was 118.06 boys to every 100 girls (54.14%) in 2010.

16.60% of the population was aged 0–14, 70.14% was aged 15–59, and 13.26% were aged 60 or over. This represented a decrease of 6.29% in the share of the population in the youngest age group, and increases of 3.36% and 2.93% for the 15-59 and 60+ shares, respectively. 91.51% of the population was of the Han Chinese nationality, and 8.49% was of other ethnic groups. The Han population increased by 5.74%, and the population of other groups increased by a combined 6.92%.

Prefectural-level "Population"

Name	Province	Population (2010)
Hefei	Anhui	5,702,000
Anqing	Anhui	5,311,000
Bengbu	Anhui	3,164,000
Bozhou	Anhui	4,851,000
Chizhou	Anhui	1,403,000
Chuzhou	Anhui	3,938,000
Fuyang	Anhui	7,600,000
Huaibei	Anhui	2,114,000
Huainan	Anhui	2,334,000
Huangshan	Anhui	1,359,000
Lu'an	Anhui	5,612,000
Ma'anshan	Anhui	1,366,000
Suzhou, Anhui	Anhui	5,353,000
Tongling	Anhui	724,000
Wuhu	Anhui	2,263,000
Xuancheng	Anhui	2,533,000
Fuzhou, Fujian	Fujian	7,115,370
Xiamen	Fujian	3,531,347
Longyan	Fujian	2,559,545
Nanping	Fujian	2,645,549
Ningde	Fujian	2,821,996
Putian	Fujian	2,778,508
Quanzhou	Fujian	8,128,530
Sanming	Fujian	2,503,388
Zhangzhou	Fujian	4,809,983
Jiuquan	Gansu	1,095,947
Jiayuguan	Gansu	231,853
Zhangye	Gansu	1,199,515
Jinchang	Gansu	464,050
Wuwei	Gansu	1,815,054
Baiyin	Gansu	1,708,751
Lanzhou	Gansu	3,616,163
Linxia	Gansu	1,946,677
Gannan	Gansu	689,132
Dingxi	Gansu	2,698,622
Longnan	Gansu	2,567,718
Tianshui	Gansu	3,262,548
Pingliang	Gansu	2,068,033
Qingyang	Gansu	2,211,191
Qingyuan	Guangdong	3,698,394
Shaoguan	Guangdong	2,826,612
Heyuan	Guangdong	2,953,019
Meizhou	Guangdong	4,240,139
Chaozhou	Guangdong	2,669,844
Zhaoqing	Guangdong	3,918,085
Yunfu	Guangdong	2,360,128
Foshan	Guangdong	7,194,311
Guangzhou	Guangdong	12,700,800
Dongguan	Guangdong	8,220,237
Huizhou	Guangdong	4,597,002
Shanwei	Guangdong	2,935,717
Jieyang	Guangdong	5,877,025
Shantou	Guangdong	5,391,028
Zhanjiang	Guangdong	6,993,304
Maoming	Guangdong	5,817,753
Yangjiang	Guangdong	2,421,812
Jiangmen	Guangdong	4,448,871
Zhongshan	Guangdong	3,120,884
Zhuhai	Guangdong	1,560,229
Shenzhen	Guangdong	10,357,938
Baise	Guangxi	3,466,800
Hechi	Guangxi	3,369,200
Liuzhou	Guangxi	3,758,700
Guilin	Guangxi	4,748,000
Hezhou	Guangxi	1,954,100
Chongzuo	Guangxi	1,994,300
Nanning	Guangxi	6,661,600
Laibin	Guangxi	2,099,700
Guigang	Guangxi	4,118,800
Wuzhou	Guangxi	2,882,200
Fangchenggang	Guangxi	866,900
Qinzhou	Guangxi	3,079,700
Beihai	Guangxi	1,539,300
Yulin, Guangxi	Guangxi	5,487,400
Bijie	Guizhou	6,536,370
Zunyi	Guizhou	6,127,009
Tongren	Guizhou	3,092,365
Liupanshui	Guizhou	2,851,180
Anshun	Guizhou	2,297,339
Guiyang	Guizhou	4,324,561
Qianxinan	Guizhou	2,805,857
Qiannan	Guizhou	3,231,161
Qiandongnan	Guizhou	3,480,626
Haikou	Hainan	2,046,189
Sanya	Hainan	685,408
Sansha	Hainan	444
Shijiazhuang	Hebei	10,163,788
Baoding	Hebei	11,194,379
Cangzhou	Hebei	7,134,053
Chengde	Hebei	3,473,197
Handan	Hebei	9,174,679
Hengshui	Hebei	4,340,773
Langfang	Hebei	4,358,839
Qinhuangdao	Hebei	2,987,605
Tangshan	Hebei	7,577,284
Xingtai	Hebei	7,104,114
Zhangjiakou	Hebei	4,345,491
Harbin	Heilongjiang	10,635,971
Daqing	Heilongjiang	2,904,532
Hegang	Heilongjiang	1,058,665
Heihe	Heilongjiang	1,673,898
Jiamusi	Heilongjiang	2,552,097
Jixi	Heilongjiang	1,862,161
Mudanjiang	Heilongjiang	2,798,723
Qiqihar	Heilongjiang	5,367,003
Qitaihe	Heilongjiang	920,419
Shuangyashan	Heilongjiang	1,462,626
Suihua	Heilongjiang	5,416,439
Yichun, Heilongjiang	Heilongjiang	1,148,126
Daxing'anling	Heilongjiang	511,564
Zhengzhou	Henan	8,626,505
Anyang	Henan	5,172,834
Hebi	Henan	1,569,100
Jiaozuo	Henan	3,539,860
Kaifeng	Henan	4,676,159
Luohe	Henan	2,544,103
Luoyang	Henan	6,549,486
Nanyang	Henan	10,263,006
Pingdingshan	Henan	4,904,367
Puyang	Henan	3,598,494
Sanmenxia	Henan	2,233,872
Shangqiu	Henan	7,362,472
Xinxiang	Henan	5,707,801
Xinyang	Henan	6,108,683
Xuchang	Henan	4,307,199
Zhoukou	Henan	8,953,172
Zhumadian	Henan	7,230,744
Wuhan	Hubei	9,785,392
Ezhou	Hubei	1,048,672
Huanggang	Hubei	6,162,072
Huangshi	Hubei	2,429,318
Jingmen	Hubei	2,873,687
Jingzhou	Hubei	5,691,707
Shiyan	Hubei	3,340,843
Suizhou	Hubei	2,162,222
Xiangyang	Hubei	5,500,307
Xianning	Hubei	2,462,583
Xiaogan	Hubei	4,814,542
Yichang	Hubei	4,059,686
Enshi	Hubei	3,290,294
Changsha	Hunan	7,044,118
Changde	Hunan	5,747,218
Chenzhou	Hunan	4,581,778
Hengyang	Hunan	7,141,462
Huaihua	Hunan	4,741,948
Loudi	Hunan	3,785,627
Shaoyang	Hunan	7,071,826
Xiangtan	Hunan	2,748,552
Yiyang	Hunan	4,313,084
Yongzhou	Hunan	5,180,235
Yueyang	Hunan	5,477,911
Zhangjiajie	Hunan	1,476,521
Zhuzhou	Hunan	3,855,609
Xiangxi	Hunan	2,547,833
Alxa	Inner Mongolia	231,334
Bayannur	Inner Mongolia	1,669,915
Wuhai	Inner Mongolia	532,902
Ordos	Inner Mongolia	1,940,653
Baotou	Inner Mongolia	2,650,364
Hohhot	Inner Mongolia	2,866,615
Ulanqab	Inner Mongolia	2,143,590
Xilingol	Inner Mongolia	1,028,022
Chifeng	Inner Mongolia	4,341,245
Tongliao	Inner Mongolia	3,139,153
Hinggan	Inner Mongolia	1,613,250
Hulunbuir	Inner Mongolia	2,549,278
Nanjing	Jiangsu	8,004,680
Changzhou	Jiangsu	4,591,972
Huai'an	Jiangsu	4,799,889
Lianyungang	Jiangsu	4,393,914
Nantong	Jiangsu	7,282,835
Suqian	Jiangsu	4,715,553
Suzhou, Jiangsu	Jiangsu	10,465,994
Taizhou, Jiangsu	Jiangsu	4,618,558
Wuxi	Jiangsu	6,372,624
Xuzhou	Jiangsu	8,580,500
Yancheng	Jiangsu	7,260,240
Yangzhou	Jiangsu	4,459,760
Zhenjiang	Jiangsu	3,113,384
Nanchang	Jiangxi	5,042,565
Fuzhou, Jiangxi	Jiangxi	3,912,312
Ganzhou	Jiangxi	8,368,440
Ji'an	Jiangxi	4,810,340
Jingdezhen	Jiangxi	1,587,477
Jiujiang	Jiangxi	4,728,763
Pingxiang	Jiangxi	1,854,510
Shangrao	Jiangxi	6,579,714
Xinyu	Jiangxi	1,138,873
Yichun, Jiangxi	Jiangxi	5,419,575
Yingtan	Jiangxi	1,124,906
Changchun	Jilin	7,677,089
Baicheng	Jilin	2,033,058
Baishan	Jilin	1,296,575
Jilin	Jilin	4,414,681
Liaoyuan	Jilin	1,176,645
Siping	Jilin	3,386,325
Songyuan	Jilin	2,881,082
Tonghua	Jilin	2,325,242
Yanbian	Jilin	2,271,600
Shenyang	Liaoning	8,106,171
Dalian	Liaoning	6,690,432
Anshan	Liaoning	3,645,884
Benxi	Liaoning	1,709,538
Chaoyang	Liaoning	3,044,641
Dandong	Liaoning	2,444,697
Fushun	Liaoning	2,138,090
Fuxin	Liaoning	1,819,339
Huludao	Liaoning	2,623,541
Jinzhou	Liaoning	3,126,463
Liaoyang	Liaoning	1,858,768
Panjin	Liaoning	1,392,493
Tieling	Liaoning	2,717,732
Yingkou	Liaoning	2,428,534
Yinchuan	Ningxia	1,993,088
Shizuishan	Ningxia	725,482
Wuzhong	Ningxia	1,273,792
Zhongwei	Ningxia	1,080,832
Guyuan	Ningxia	1,228,156
Haixi	Qinghai	489,338
Haibei	Qinghai	273,304
Xining	Qinghai	2,208,708
Haidong	Qinghai	1,396,846
Hainan	Qinghai	441,689
Huangnan	Qinghai	256,716
Yushu	Qinghai	378,439
Golog	Qinghai	181,682
Xi'an	Shaanxi	8,467,837
Ankang	Shaanxi	2,629,906
Baoji	Shaanxi	3,716,731
Hanzhong	Shaanxi	3,416,196
Shangluo	Shaanxi	2,341,742
Tongchuan	Shaanxi	834,437
Weinan	Shaanxi	5,286,077
Xianyang	Shaanxi	4,894,834
Yan'an	Shaanxi	2,187,009
Yulin, Shaanxi	Shaanxi	3,351,437
Jinan	Shandong	6,814,000
Qingdao	Shandong	8,715,100
Binzhou	Shandong	3,748,500
Dezhou	Shandong	5,568,200
Dongying	Shandong	2,035,300
Heze	Shandong	8,287,800
Jining	Shandong	8,081,900
Laiwu	Shandong	1,298,500
Liaocheng	Shandong	5,789,900
Linyi	Shandong	10,039,400
Rizhao	Shandong	2,801,100
Tai'an	Shandong	5,494,200
Weifang	Shandong	9,086,200
Weihai	Shandong	2,804,800
Yantai	Shandong	6,968,200
Zaozhuang	Shandong	3,729,300
Zibo	Shandong	4,530,600
Taiyuan	Shanxi	4,201,591
Changzhi	Shanxi	3,334,564
Datong	Shanxi	3,318,057
Jincheng	Shanxi	2,279,151
Jinzhong	Shanxi	3,249,425
Linfen	Shanxi	4,316,612
Lüliang	Shanxi	3,727,057
Shuozhou	Shanxi	1,714,857
Xinzhou	Shanxi	3,067,501
Yangquan	Shanxi	1,368,502
Yuncheng	Shanxi	5,134,794
Garzê	Sichuan	1,091,872
Ngawa	Sichuan	898,713
Mianyang	Sichuan	4,613,862
Guangyuan	Sichuan	2,484,123
Nanchong	Sichuan	6,278,622
Bazhong	Sichuan	3,283,771
Dazhou	Sichuan	5,468,092
Ya'an	Sichuan	1,507,264
Chengdu	Sichuan	14,047,625
Deyang	Sichuan	3,615,759
Suining	Sichuan	3,252,551
Guang'an	Sichuan	3,205,476
Meishan	Sichuan	2,950,548
Ziyang	Sichuan	3,665,064
Leshan	Sichuan	3,235,756
Neijiang	Sichuan	3,702,847
Zigong	Sichuan	2,678,898
Yibin	Sichuan	4,472,001
Luzhou	Sichuan	4,218,426
Liangshan	Sichuan	4,532,809
Panzhihua	Sichuan	1,214,121
Ngari	Tibet	95,465
Nagqu Prefecture	Tibet	462,382
Qamdo Prefecture	Tibet	657,505
Xigazê Prefecture	Tibet	703,292
Lhasa	Tibet	559,423
Lhoka/Shannan Prefecture	Tibet	328,990
Nyingchi Prefecture	Tibet	195,109
Altay	Xinjiang	603,280
Bortala	Xinjiang	443,680
Tacheng	Xinjiang	1,219,212
Karamay	Xinjiang	391,008
Changji	Xinjiang	1,428,592
Ürümqi	Xinjiang	3,110,280
Turpan	Xinjiang	622,679
Kumul	Xinjiang	572,400
Ili	Xinjiang	2,482,627
Kizilsu	Xinjiang	525,599
Kashgar	Xinjiang	3,979,362
Aksu	Xinjiang	2,370,887
Hotan	Xinjiang	2,014,365
Bayingolin	Xinjiang	1,278,492
Kunming	Yunnan	6,432,000
Qujing	Yunnan	5,855,000
Yuxi	Yunnan	2,304,000
Baoshan	Yunnan	2,506,000
Zhaotong	Yunnan	5,213,000
Lijiang	Yunnan	1,245,000
Pu'er	Yunnan	2,543,000
Lincang	Yunnan	2,430,000
Dehong	Yunnan	1,211,000
Nujiang	Yunnan	534,000
Dêqên	Yunnan	400,000
Dali	Yunnan	3,456,000
Chuxiong	Yunnan	2,684,000
Honghe	Yunnan	4,501,000
Wenshan	Yunnan	3,518,000
Xishuangbanna	Yunnan	1,134,000
Hangzhou	Zhejiang	8,700,400
Ningbo	Zhejiang	7,605,700
Huzhou	Zhejiang	2,893,500
Jiaxing	Zhejiang	4,501,700
Jinhua	Zhejiang	5,361,600
Lishui	Zhejiang	2,117,000
Quzhou	Zhejiang	2,122,700
Shaoxing	Zhejiang	4,912,200
Taizhou, Zhejiang	Zhejiang	5,968,800
Wenzhou	Zhejiang	9,122,100
Zhoushan	Zhejiang	1,121,300

=== Educational attainment ===
The census found that, in Mainland China, 119,636,790 people had completed higher education, 187,985,979 had completed only senior secondary education, 519,656,445 had completed only junior secondary education, 358,764,003 had completed only primary education, and 54,656,573 were illiterate. Since 2000, out of every 100,000 people, the number with higher education has increased from 3,611 to 8,930, the number with senior secondary education has increased from 11,146 to 14,032, the number with junior secondary education increased from 33,961 to 38,788, and the number of people with only primary education decreased from 35,701 to 26,779. The illiteracy rate declined from 6.72% to 4.08%.

Provincial-level "Educational attainment"

Administrative region	Completed higher education	Completed higher education (%)	For every 100,000 people higher education	Completed senior secondary education	Some senior secondary education (%)	Completed senior secondary education (%)	Completed junior secondary education	Some junior secondary education (%)	Completed junior secondary education (%)	Completed primary education	Some primary education (%)	Completed primary education (%)	Illiterate	Illiterate (%)	Illiteracy rate (%)
National total	119,637	8.93	8,930	187,986	14.03	22.96	519,656	38.79	61.75	358,764	26.78	88.53	54,657	4.08	4.89
Beijing	6,178	31.50	31,501	4,162	21.22	52.72	6,157	31.39	84.12	1,953	9.96	94.07	333	1.70	1.86
Shanghai	5,053	21.95	21,952	4,826	20.97	42.92	8,393	36.46	79.38	3,116	13.54	92.91	631	2.74	3.00
Tianjin	2,262	17.48	17,480	2,672	20.65	38.13	4,936	38.15	76.28	2,206	17.05	93.33	271	2.10	2.33
Liaoning	5,234	11.96	11,965	6,469	14.79	26.75	19,829	45.33	72.08	9,365	21.41	93.49	844	1.93	2.18
Jiangsu	8,507	10.81	10,815	12,698	16.14	26.96	30,418	38.67	65.63	19,017	24.18	89.80	2,995	3.81	4.38
Xinjiang	2,320	10.64	10,635	2,526	11.58	22.22	7,874	36.10	58.31	6,560	30.08	88.39	516	2.36	2.98
Shaanxi	3,940	10.56	10,556	5,888	15.77	26.33	14,981	40.14	66.46	8,741	23.42	89.88	1,398	3.74	4.39
Inner Mongolia	2,522	10.21	10,208	3,737	15.13	25.33	9,689	39.22	64.55	6,280	25.42	89.97	1,005	4.07	4.74
Jilin	2,716	9.89	9,890	4,632	16.87	26.76	11,553	42.07	68.83	6,607	24.06	92.88	527	1.92	2.18
Hubei	5,456	9.53	9,533	9,502	16.60	26.13	22,676	39.62	65.75	13,091	22.87	88.62	2,619	4.58	5.31
Zhejiang	5,078	9.33	9,330	7,381	13.56	22.89	19,964	36.68	59.57	15,685	28.82	88.39	3,061	5.62	6.48
Ningxia	577	9.15	9,152	785	12.45	21.60	2,121	33.65	55.26	1,879	29.83	85.08	392	6.22	7.92
Heilongjiang	3,474	9.07	9,067	5,743	14.99	24.06	17,272	45.08	69.14	9,225	24.08	93.22	788	2.06	2.34
Shanxi	3,114	8.72	8,721	5,619	15.73	24.45	16,115	45.13	69.58	7,805	21.85	91.43	762	2.13	2.57
Shandong	8,329	8.69	8,694	13,323	13.91	22.60	38,468	40.16	62.76	23,912	24.96	87.72	4,757	4.97	5.89
Chongqing	2,493	8.64	8,642	3,811	13.21	21.86	9,514	32.98	54.84	9,747	33.79	88.63	1,239	4.30	5.17
Qinghai	485	8.62	8,616	587	10.43	19.04	1,428	25.37	44.42	1,984	35.27	79.68	576	10.23	12.94
Fujian	3,085	8.36	8,361	5,119	13.88	22.24	13,978	37.89	60.12	10,995	29.80	89.92	900	2.44	2.89
Guangdong	8,567	8.21	8,214	17,807	17.07	25.29	44,760	42.91	68.20	23,944	22.96	91.16	2,042	1.96	2.36
Hainan	674	7.77	7,768	1,272	14.67	22.43	3,620	41.74	64.17	1,972	22.74	86.91	354	4.08	5.11
Hunan	4,989	7.59	7,595	10,129	15.42	23.01	25,963	39.53	62.54	17,594	26.79	89.33	1,754	2.67	3.24
Gansu	1,923	7.52	7,520	3,245	12.69	20.21	7,983	31.21	51.42	8,313	32.50	83.92	2,223	8.69	10.62
Hebei	5,243	7.30	7,296	9,132	12.71	20.00	31,903	44.40	64.40	17,720	24.66	89.06	1,877	2.61	3.14
Jiangxi	3,052	6.85	6,847	5,493	12.33	19.17	16,842	37.79	56.96	13,373	30.01	86.97	1,394	3.13	4.00
Anhui	3,985	6.70	6,697	6,410	10.77	17.47	22,619	38.01	55.49	16,629	27.95	83.43	4,965	8.34	10.17
Sichuan	5,368	6.68	6,675	9,045	11.25	17.92	28,057	34.89	52.81	27,847	34.63	87.44	4,377	5.44	6.56
Henan	6,016	6.40	6,398	12,423	13.21	19.61	39,923	42.46	62.07	22,668	24.11	86.18	3,991	4.25	5.37
Guangxi	2,751	5.98	5,978	5,079	11.03	17.01	17,842	38.76	55.78	14,581	31.68	87.45	1,249	2.71	3.47
Yunnan	2,656	5.78	5,778	3,850	8.38	14.15	12,631	27.48	41.63	19,944	43.39	85.02	2,770	6.03	7.60
Tibet	165	5.51	5,507	131	4.36	9.87	386	12.85	22.72	1,098	36.59	59.31	—	—	—
Guizhou	1,839	5.29	5,292	2,530	7.28	12.57	10,351	29.79	42.36	13,681	39.37	81.74	3,039	8.74	11.69

=== Population distribution ===
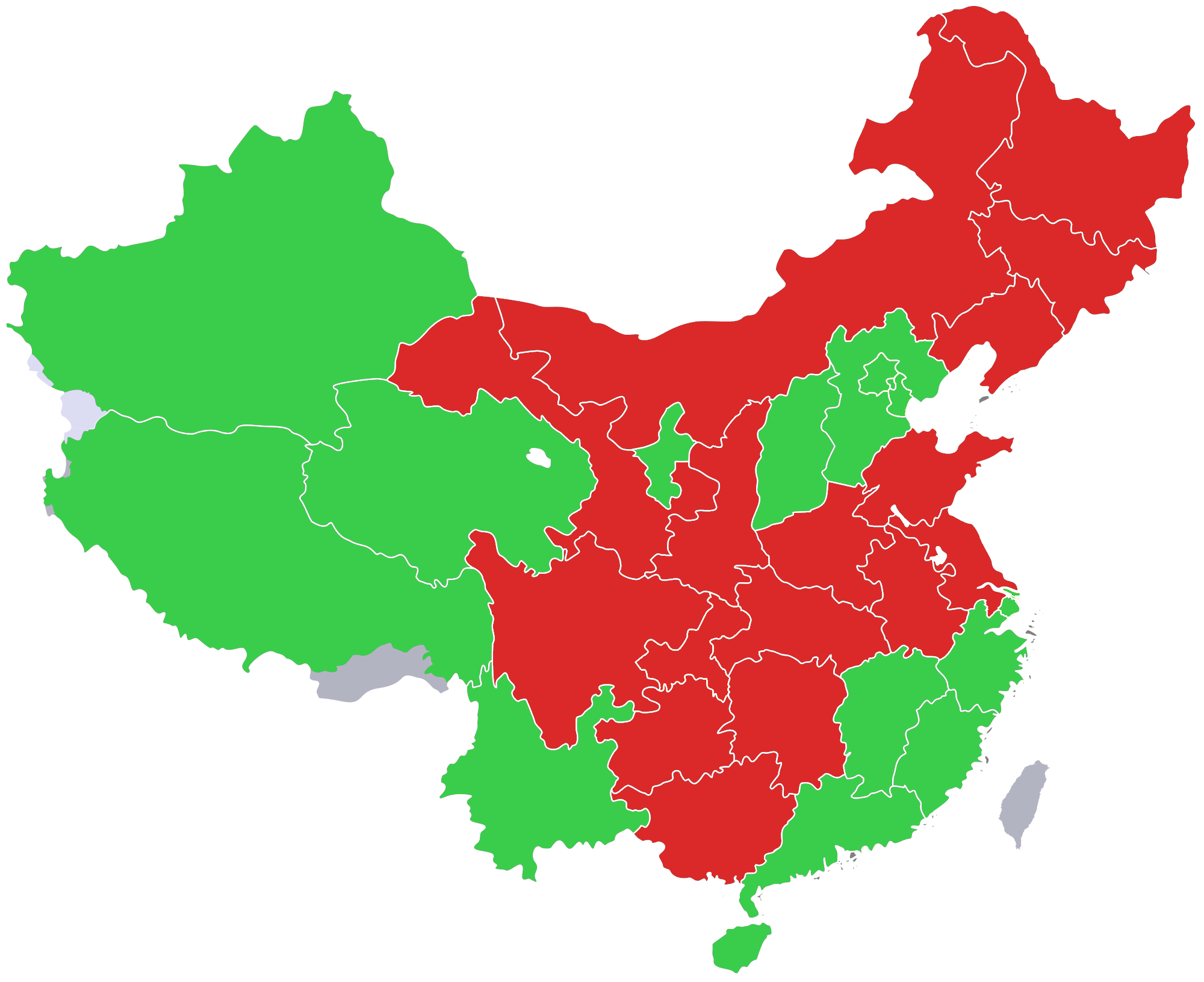
Map displaying provinces whose population as a proportion of Mainland China's total population increased (green) and decreased (red)

Rank	Administrative region	Population as of 2000 Census	Population as of 2010 Census	Numerical change	Proportion 2000 Census	Proportion 2010 Census
1	Guangdong	85,225,007	104,303,132	▲19,078,125	6.83%	7.79%
2	Shandong	89,971,789	95,793,065	▲5,821,276	7.17%	7.15%
3	Henan	91,236,854	94,023,567	▲2,786,713	7.31%	7.02%
4	Sichuan	82,348,296	80,418,200	▼1,930,096	6.58%	6.00%
5	Jiangsu	73,043,577	78,659,903	▲5,616,326	5.88%	5.87%
6	Hebei	66,684,419	71,854,202	▲5,169,783	5.33%	5.36%
7	Hunan	63,274,173	65,683,722	▲2,409,549	5.09%	4.90%
8	Anhui	58,999,948	59,500,510	▲500,562	4.73%	4.44%
9	Hubei	59,508,870	57,237,740	▼2,271,130	4.76%	4.27%
10	Zhejiang	45,930,651	54,426,891	▲8,496,240	3.69%	4.06%
11	Guangxi	43,854,538	46,026,629	▲2,172,091	3.55%	3.44%
12	Yunnan	42,360,089	45,966,239	▲3,606,150	3.39%	3.43%
13	Jiangxi	40,397,598	44,567,475	▲4,169,877	3.27%	3.33%
14	Liaoning	41,824,412	43,746,323	▲1,921,911	3.35%	3.27%
15	Heilongjiang	36,237,576	38,312,224	▲2,074,648	2.91%	2.86%
16	Shaanxi	35,365,072	37,327,378	▲1,962,306	2.85%	2.79%
17	Fujian	34,097,947	36,894,216	▲2,796,269	2.74%	2.75%
18	Shanxi	32,471,242	35,712,111	▲3,240,869	2.60%	2.67%
19	Guizhou	35,247,695	34,746,468	▼501,227	2.78%	2.59%
20	Chongqing	30,512,763	28,846,170	▼1,666,593	2.44%	2.15%
21	Jilin	26,802,191	27,462,297	▲660,106	2.16%	2.05%
22	Gansu	25,124,282	25,575,254	▲450,972	2.02%	1.91%
23	Inner Mongolia	23,323,347	24,706,321	▲1,382,974	1.88%	1.84%
24	Shanghai	16,407,734	23,019,148	▲6,611,414	1.32%	1.72%
25	Xinjiang	18,459,511	21,813,334	▲3,353,823	1.52%	1.63%
26	Beijing	13,569,194	19,612,368	▲6,043,174	1.09%	1.46%
27	Tianjin	9,848,731	12,938,224	▲3,089,493	0.79%	0.97%
28	Hainan	7,559,035	8,671,518	▲1,112,483	0.62%	0.65%
29	Ningxia	5,486,393	6,301,350	▲814,957	0.44%	0.47%
30	Qinghai	4,822,963	5,626,722	▲803,759	0.41%	0.42%
31	Tibet	2,616,329	3,002,166	▲385,837	0.21%	0.22%
—	Military	2,498,600	2,300,000	▼198,600	—	—
—	Residence Difficult to Determine	—	4,649,985	—	—	—
—	National total (excluding below)	1,245,110,826	1,339,724,852	▲94,614,026	100%	100%
*	Hong Kong S.A.R.	6,708,389	7,061,200	▲352,811	—	—
*	Macau S.A.R.	431,500	552,300	▲120,800	—	—
*	Taiwan Area	22,276,672	23,162,123	▲885,451	—	—

=== Foreign nationals and residents of Hong Kong, Macau and Taiwan ===
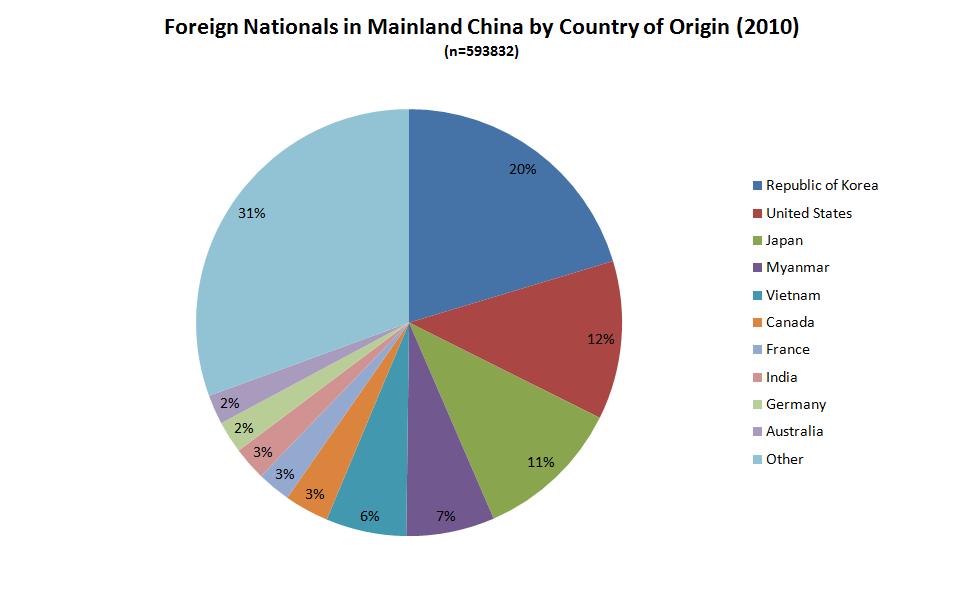
A breakdown of foreign nationals in Mainland China at the time of the census.

The census also recorded 593,832 foreign nationals, 234,829 residents of Hong Kong SAR, 21,201 residents of Macau SAR, and 170,283 residents of Taiwan residing in Mainland China, a total of 1,020,145 additional persons. 605,821 of these were male, and 414,324 were female. Of the foreign nationals, 120,750 were from the Republic of Korea, 71,493 were from the United States, 66,159 were from Japan, 39,776 were from Myanmar, 36,205 were from Vietnam, 19,990 were from Canada, 15,087 were from France, 15,051 were from India, 14,446 were from Germany, and 13,286 were from Australia. The remaining 181,589 were from other countries.

== Naturalisation ==
According to The Economist, China had only 1,448 naturalised Chinese in total at the 2010 census.

== See also ==
- Census in China
