= Lisu =

Lisu may refer to:

- Lisu people, an ethnic group of the mountainous regions of Yunnan (China), Arunachal Pradesh (India), northern Myanmar and Thailand
- Lisu language, Tibeto-Burman language spoken by the Lisu people
  - Fraser script or Old Lisu Alphabet, used to write the language
  - Lisu syllabary
  - Lisu (Unicode block), the block of Unicode characters for the Lisu language
- Lisu Church, Christian church of the Lisu people

== See also ==
- Li Su (disambiguation)
