= Ethnic minorities in China =

Ethnic minorities in China are the non-Han population in the People's Republic of China (PRC). The PRC officially recognizes 55 ethnic minority groups within China in addition to the Han majority. As of 2020, the combined population of officially-recognized minority groups comprised 8.89% of the population of Mainland China. In addition to these officially-recognized ethnic minority groups, there are Chinese nationals who privately classify themselves as members of unrecognized ethnic groups, such as the very small Chinese Jewish, Tuvan, and Ili Turk communities, as well as the much larger Oirat and Japanese communities.

In Chinese, 'ethnic minority' has translated to shǎoshù mínzú (少數民族), wherein mínzú (民族) means 'nationality' or 'nation' (as in ethnic group)—in line with the Soviet concept of ethnicity—and shǎoshù (少數) means 'minority'. Since the anthropological concept of ethnicity does not precisely match the Chinese or Soviet concepts, some scholars use the neologism zúqún (族群, 'ethnic group') to unambiguously refer to ethnicity. Including shǎoshù mínzú, Sun Yat-sen used the term zhōnghuá mínzú (中華民族, 'Chinese nation' or 'Chinese nationality') to reflect his belief that all of China's ethnic groups were parts of a single Chinese nation.

The ethnic minority groups officially recognized by the PRC include those residing within mainland China, as well as Taiwanese indigenous peoples pursuant to its sovereign claim over Taiwan. However, the PRC does not accept the term indigenous people or its variations, since it might suggest that Han people are not indigenous to Taiwan, or that Taiwan is not historically a part of China. Also, where the Republic of China (ROC) government in Taiwan, as of 2020, officially recognises 16 Taiwanese indigenous tribes, the PRC classifies them all under a single ethnic group, the Gāoshān (高山, 'high mountain') minority, out of reluctance to recognize ethnic classifications derived from the work of Japanese anthropologists during the Japanese rule. This is despite the fact that not all Taiwanese indigenous peoples actually inhabit the mountains; for example, the Tao people traditionally inhabit the island of Lanyu. The regional governments of Hong Kong and Macau do not use this ethnic classification system, so figures by the PRC government exclude these two territories.

== History of ethnicity in China ==
=== Early history ===
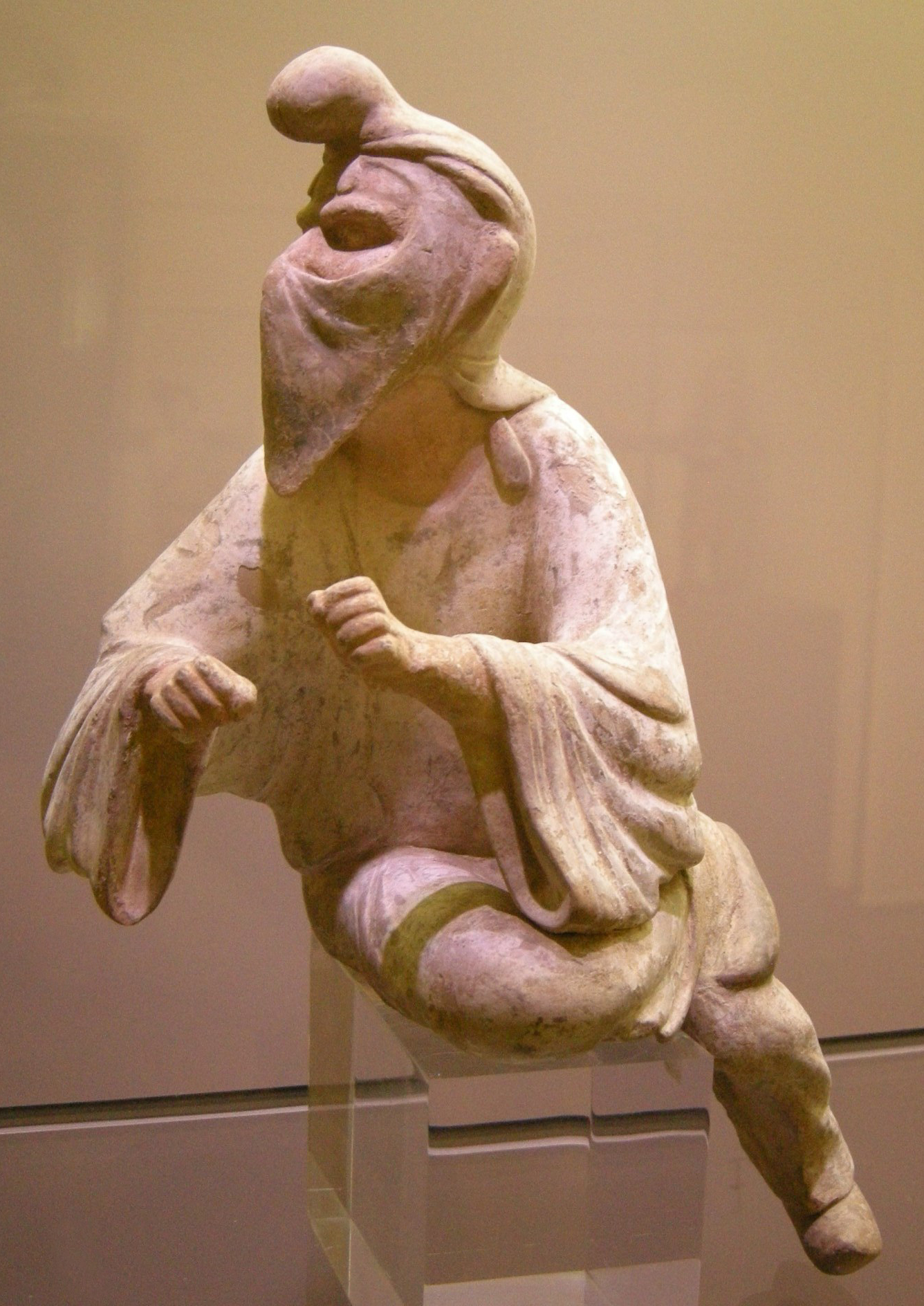
An 8th-century Tang dynasty Chinese clay figurine of a Sogdian man (an Eastern Iranian person) wearing a distinctive cap and face veil, possibly a camel rider or even a Zoroastrian priest engaging in a ritual at a fire temple, since face veils were used to avoid contaminating the holy fire with breath or saliva; Museum of Oriental Art (Turin), Italy.

Throughout much of recorded Chinese history, there was little attempt by Chinese authors to separate the concepts of nationality, culture, and ethnicity. Those outside of the reach of imperial control and dominant patterns of Chinese culture were thought of as separate groups of people regardless of whether they would today be considered as a separate ethnicity. The self-conceptualization of Han largely revolved around this center-periphery cultural divide. Thus, the process of Sinicization throughout history had as much to do with the spreading of imperial rule and culture as it did with actual ethnic migration.

This understanding persisted (with some changes during the Qing dynasty due to the importation of Western ideas) until the Communists seized power in 1949. Their understanding of minorities had been heavily influenced by the policies of the Soviet leader Joseph Stalin and his 1913 pamphlet on the subject—and they also influenced the Communist regimes in the neighbouring countries of Vietnam and Laos—but the Soviet definition of minorities did not cleanly map onto the Chinese people's historical definition of minorities. Soviet thinking about minorities was based on the belief that a nation consisted of people who spoke and wrote a common language, people whose culture was historic, and historic territory. Therefore, the people who inhabited each nation had the theoretical right to secede from a proposed federated government. This differed from the previous way of thinking mainly in that instead of defining all those under imperial rule as Chinese, the nation (as defined as a space upon which power is projected) and ethnicity (the identity of the governed) were now separate; being under central rule no longer automatically meant being defined as Chinese. The Soviet model as applied to China gave rise to the autonomous regions in China; these areas were thought to be their own nations that had theoretical autonomy from the central government.

During World War II, the American Asiatic Association published an entry in the 40th volume of their academic journal, Asia, concerning the problem of whether Chinese Muslims were Chinese or a separate 'ethnic minority', and the factors which led to either classification. It tackled the question of why Muslims who were Chinese were considered a different race from other Chinese, and the separate question of whether all Muslims in China were united into one race. The first problem was posed with a comparison to Chinese Buddhists, who were not considered a separate race. It concluded that the reason Chinese Muslims were considered separate was because of different factors like religion, culture, military feudalism, and that considering them a "racial minority" was wrong. It also came to the conclusion that the Japanese military spokesman was the only person who was propagating the false assertion that Chinese Muslims had "racial unity", which was disproved by the fact that Muslims in China were composed of multitudes of different races, separate from each other as were the "Germans and English", such as the Mongol Hui of Hezhou, Salar Hui of Qinghai, and Chan Tou Hui of Turkistan. The Japanese were trying to spread the lie that Chinese Muslims were one race, in order to propagate the claim that they should be separated from China into an "independent political organization."

=== Distinguishing nationalities in the PRC ===
Early documents of the People's Republic of China (PRC), such as the 1982 constitution, followed the Soviet practice of identifying 'nationalities' in the sense of ethnic groups (the concept is not to be confused with state citizenship). The Chinese term mínzú (民族), made during the Republican period, translates this Soviet concept. The English translation (common in official documents) of 'nationality' again follows Soviet practice; in order to avoid confusion, however, alternative phraseology such as 'ethnicity' or 'ethnic group' is often used. Since the anthropological concept of ethnicity does not precisely match the Chinese or Soviet concepts (which, after all, are defined and regulated by the state), some scholars use the neologism zuqun (族群, 'ethnic group') to unambiguously refer to ethnicity.

After 1949, a team of social scientists was assembled to enumerate the various mínzú. An immediate difficulty was that identities "on the ground" did not necessarily follow logically from things like shared languages or cultures; two neighboring regions might seem to share a common culture, and yet insist on their distinct identities. Since this would lead to absurd results—every village could hardly send a representative to the National People's Congress—the social scientists attempted to construct coherent groupings of minorities using language as the main criterion for differentiation. Thus some villages with very different cultural practices and histories were lumped together under the same ethnonym. For example, the "Zhuang" ethnic group largely served as a catch-all for various hill villages in Guangxi province.

The actual census taking of who was and was not a minority further eroded the neat differentiating lines the social scientists had drawn up. Individual ethnic status was often awarded based on family tree histories. If one had a father (or mother, for ethnic groups that were considered matrilineal) that had a surname considered to belong to a particular ethnic group, then one was awarded the coveted minority status. This had the result that villages that had previously thought of themselves as homogenous and essentially Han were now divided between those with ethnic identity and those without.

The team of social scientists that assembled the list of all the ethnic groups also described what they considered to be the key differentiating attributes between each group, including culture, custom, and language. The center then used this list of attributes to select representatives of each group to perform on television and radio in an attempt to reinforce the government's narrative of China as a multi-ethnic state and to prevent the culture of the minority ethnic groups from assimilating by the Han and the rest of the world.

Under this process, 39 ethnic groups were recognized by the first national census in 1954. This further increased to 54 by the second national census in 1964, with the Lhoba group added in 1965. The last change was the addition of the Jino people in 1979, bringing the number of recognized ethnic groups to the current 56.

=== Reform and opening up ===
Ethnolinguistic map of China in 1983.

However, as China started reform and opening up post-1979, many Han acquired enough money to begin to travel. One of the favorite travel experiences of the wealthy was visits to minority areas, to see the exotic rituals of the minority peoples. Responding to this interest, many minority entrepreneurs, despite themselves perhaps never having grown up practicing the dances, rituals, or songs themselves, began to cater to these tourists by performing acts similar to what the older generation or the local residents told. In this way, the groups of people named Zhuang or other named minorities have begun to have more in common with their fellow co-ethnics, as they have adopted similar self-conceptions in response to the economic demand of consumers for their performances.

The categorization of 55 minority groups was a major step forward from denial of the existence of different ethnic groups in China which had been the policy of Sun Yet-Sen's Nationalist government that came to power in 1911, which also engaged in the common use of derogatory names to refer to minorities (a practice officially abolished in 1951). However, the Communist Party's categorization was also rampantly criticized since it reduced the number of recognized ethnic groups by eightfold, and today the wèi shìbié mínzú (literally 'undistinguished ethnic groups') total more than 730,000 people. These groups include Geija, Khmu, Kucong, Mang, Deng, Sherpas, Bajia and Youtai (Jewish).

After the breakup of Yugoslavia and the dissolution of the Soviet Union, there was a shift in official conceptions of minorities in China: rather than defining them as 'nationalities', they became 'ethnic groups'. The difference between 'nationality' and 'ethnicity', as Uradyn Erden-Bulag describes it, is that the former treats the minorities of China as societies with "a fully functional division of labor," history, and territory, whereas the latter treats minorities as a "category" and focuses on their maintenance of boundaries and their self-definition in relation to the majority group. These changes are reflected in uses of the term mínzú (民族) and its translations. The official journal Minzu Tuanjie changed its English name from Nationality Unity to Ethnic Unity in 1995. Similarly, the Central University for Nationalities changed its name to Minzu University of China. Scholars began to prefer the term zuqun (族群, 'ethnic group') over minzu. The Chinese model for identifying and categorizing ethnic minorities established at the founding of the PRC followed the Soviet model, drawing inspiration from Joseph Stalin's 1913 "four commons" criteria to identify ethnic groups: "(1) a distinct language; (2) a recognized indigenous homeland or common territory; (3) a common economic life; and (4) a strong sense of identity and distinctive customs, including dress, religion and foods".

=== Contemporary policies ===
Following the dissolution of the Soviet Union, intellectuals and policymakers within China began to argue that the designation of ethnic minority groups could be a threat to the country. Violence in Xinjiang and Tibet was cited as evidence for this argument. Peking University professor Ma Rong argued that earlier Soviet-inspired Chinese Communist Party (CCP) policies had unwittingly created a "dual structure" of governance in which the representation and identity given to recognized ethnic groups would increase ethnocultural differences and create social conflict. He recommended new policies of ethnic fusion and assimilation. These proposals made by Ma and others were controversial at the time, but they would find a place at the heart of the policy of the general secretaryship of Xi Jinping. Xi has shifted state policy towards assimilation in what he calls the "grand minzu fusion" or "the coalescing of blood and minds." The CCP under Xi has reacted to violence committed by a number of Uyghurs by the imprisonment of this group in the Xinjiang re-education camps. In 2020, a Han Chinese person was named director of the State Ethnic Affairs Commission for the first time since 1954.

==== Law on Promoting Ethnic Unity and Progress ====
The Law on Promoting Ethnic Unity and Progress is the People's Republic of China's (PRC) guiding legislation concerning ethnic minorities. The law was introduced by the National People's Congress (NPC)'s Ethnic Affairs Committee and submitted to the NPC on 8 September 2025. It was signed into law on 12 March 2026 and enacted on 1 July 2026. The law codifies CCP general secretary Xi Jinping's policies regarding the sinicization of ethnic minorities. The law has been widely criticized by scholars, the United Nations High Commissioner for Human Rights, multiple governments, former United Nations special rapporteurs, and human rights activists outside of China. The law's promotion of extraterritorial enforcement has been likened to transnational repression.

== Ethnic groups ==
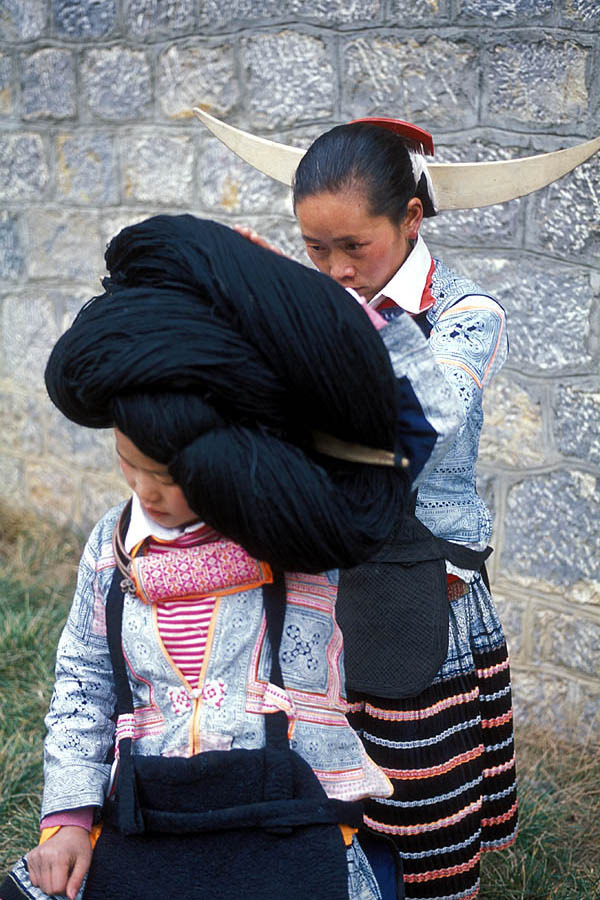
The Long-horn tribe, a small branch of ethnic Miao in the western part of Guizhou Province

China is officially composed of 56 ethnic groups (55 minorities plus the dominant Han). However, some of the ethnic groups as classified by the PRC government contain, within themselves, diverse groups of people. Various groups of the Miao minority, for example, speak different dialects of the Hmong–Mien languages, Tai–Kadai languages, and Chinese, and practice a variety of different cultural customs. Whereas in many nations a citizen's minority status is defined by their self-identification as an ethnic minority, in China minority nationality (shǎoshù mínzú) is fixed at birth, a practice that can be traced to the foundation of the PRC, when the Communist Party commissioned studies to categorize and delineate groups based on research teams' investigation of minorities' social history, economic life, language and religion in China's different regions.

The degree of variation between ethnic groups is not consistent. Many ethnic groups are described as having unique characteristics from other minority groups and from the dominant Han, but there are also some that are very similar to the Han majority group. Most Hui Chinese are indistinguishable from Han Chinese except for the fact that they practice Islam, and most Manchu are considered to be largely assimilated into dominant Han society.

China's official 55 minorities are located primarily in the south, west, and north of China. Only Tibet Autonomous Region and Xinjiang Uygur Autonomous Region have a majority population of official minorities, while all other provinces, municipalities and regions of China have a Han majority. In Beijing itself, the Han ethnic composition makes up nearly 96% of the total population, while the ethnic minority total is 4.31%, or a population of 584,692 (as of 2008).

Much of the dialog within China regarding minorities has generally portrayed minorities as being further behind the Han in progress toward modernization and modernity. Minority groups are often portrayed as rustic, wild, and antiquated. As the government often portrays itself as a benefactor of the minorities, those less willing to assimilate (despite the offers of assistance) are portrayed as masculine, violent, and unreasonable. Groups that have been depicted this way include the Tibetans, Uyghurs and the Mongols. Groups that have been more willing to assimilate (and accept the help of the government) are often portrayed as feminine and sexual, including the Miao, Tujia and the Dai.

=== Demographics ===
The largest ethnic group, Han, according to a 2005 sampling, constitute about 91.9% of the total population. The next largest ethnic groups in terms of population include the Zhuang (18 million), Manchu (10 million), Hui (10 million), Miao (9 million), Uyghur (8 million), Yi (7.8 million), Tujia (8 million), Mongols (5.8 million), Tibetans (5.4 million), Buyei (3 million), Yao (3.1 million), and Koreans (2.5 million). Minority populations have grown faster than the Han population due to them being unaffected by the One Child Policy.

In contemporary China, the minority population has increased faster than the overall population. In 2020, 8.9% of Chinese were ethnic minorities, up from 6.7% in 1982.

=== List of ethnic groups ===
Officially recognized groups

- Achang
- Bai
- Blang
- Bonan
- Bouyei
- Chosŏn (Korean)
- Dai
- Daur
- De'ang
- Derung
- Dong
- Dongxiang
- Evenki
- Gaoshan
- Gelao
- Gin (Viet)
- Han
- Hani
- Hui
- Jingpo
- Jino
- Kazakhs
- Kyrgyz
- Lahu
- Lhoba
- Li
- Lisu
- Manchu
- Maonan
- Miao
- Monba
- Mongol
- Mulao
- Nakhi
- Nanai
- Nu
- Oroqen
- Pumi
- Qiang
- Russian
- Salar
- She
- Sui
- Tajik
- Tatar
- Tibetan
- Tu
- Tujia
- Uyghur
- Uzbeks
- Wa
- Xibe
- Yao
- Yi
- Yugur
- Zhuang

Han subgroups

- Beijing Hans
- Chongqing Hans
- Gan Hans
- Gansu Hans
- Guizhou Hans
- Hainan Hans
- Hakka Hans
- Hebei Hans
- Heilongjiang Hans
- Henan Hans
- Hubei Hans
- Jiaoliao Hans
- Jilin & Liaoning Hans
- Lower Yangtze Hans
- Min Hans
- Shaanxi Hans
- Shandong Hans
- Shanxi Hans
- Sichuan Hans
- Taiwan Hans
- Tianjin Hans
- Wu Hans
- Xiang Hans
- Yue Hans
- Yunnan Hans

Mongolian subgroups

- Buryats
- Chinese Mongols
- Daurs
- Khalka Mongols
- Oirat Mongols
- Sartuul Mongols

=== Undistinguished ethnic groups ===
"Undistinguished" ethnic groups are ethnic groups that have not been officially recognized or classified by the central government. The group numbers more than 730,000 people, and would constitute the twentieth most populous ethnic group of China if taken as a single group. The vast majority of this group is found in Guizhou Province.

These "undistinguished ethnic groups" do not include groups that have been controversially classified into existing groups. For example, the Mosuo are officially classified as Naxi, and the Chuanqing are classified as Han Chinese, but they reject these classifications and view themselves as separate ethnic groups.

Citizens of mainland China who are of foreign origin are classified using yet another separate label: "foreigners naturalized into the Chinese citizenship" (外国人入中国籍). However, if a newly naturalized citizen already belongs to a recognized existing group among the 56 ethnic groups, then he or she is classified into that ethnic group rather than the special label.

== Guarantee of rights and interests ==
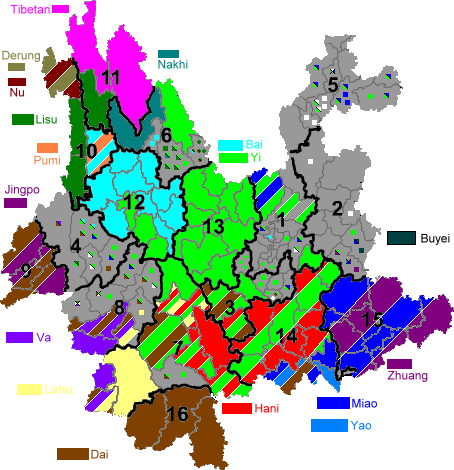
Major Autonomous areas within Yunnan. (excluding Hui)

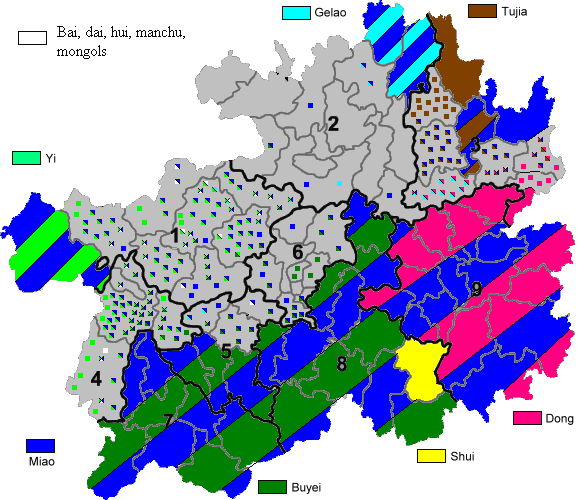
Major Autonomous areas within Guizhou. (excluding Hui)

The Constitution of China and laws guarantee equal rights to all ethnic groups in China and help promote ethnic minority groups' economic and cultural development. The constitution prohibits both discrimination and acts of disunity. Articles 115 and 116 of the constitution state that in the provincial level autonomous regions and the autonomous prefectures and counties set aside for minority administration, local states via the local people's congresses "have the power to enact regulations on the exercise of autonomy and other separate regulations in the light of the political, economic, and cultural characteristics" of those areas.

One notable preferential treatment ethnic minorities enjoy was their exemption from the population growth control of the One-Child Policy. But according to an investigative report by The Associated Press published at 28 June 2020, the Chinese government is taking draconian measures to slash birth rates among Uighurs and other minorities as part of a sweeping campaign to curb its Muslim population, even as it encourages some of the country's Han majority to have more children. While individual women have spoken out before about forced birth control, the practice is far more widespread and systematic than previously known, according to an AP investigation based on government statistics, state documents and interviews with 30 ex-detainees, family members and a former detention camp instructor. The campaign over the past four years in the far west region of Xinjiang is leading to what some experts are calling a form of "demographic genocide". Ethnic minorities enjoy other special exemptions which vary by province- these include lower tax thresholds and lower required scores for entry into university. The use of these measures to raise ethnic minorities' human capital is seen by the central government as important for improving the economic development of ethnic minorities. Ethnic minorities are represented in the National People's Congress as well as governments at the provincial and prefectural levels. Some ethnic minorities in China live in what are described as ethnic autonomous areas. These "regional autonomies" guarantee ethnic minorities the freedom to use and develop their ethnic languages, and to maintain their own cultural and social customs. In addition, the PRC government has provided preferential economic development and aid to areas where ethnic minorities live. Furthermore, the Chinese government has allowed and encouraged the involvement of ethnic minority participation in the party. Even though ethnic minorities in China are granted specific rights and freedoms, many ethnic minorities still have headed towards the urban life in order to obtain a well paid job.

Minorities have widely benefited from China's minimum livelihood guarantee program (known as the dibao) a programme introduced nationwide in 1999 whose number of participants had reached nearly twenty million by 2012. The nature of the selection process entails that the programme's providers be proactive and willing in seeking out impoverished prospective participants, as opposed to more comprehensive welfare schemes such as the Urban Resident Basic Medical Insurance Scheme (URBMI), which is universally implemented. As such, the selection process for participants in the dibao programme has generated a perception among observers of the scheme that this programme have been used to mitigate dissent and neutralize any threat to the government that could lead to unrest- including negative performance evaluations of local officials.

The Chinese government has been accused of committing a series of ongoing human rights abuses against Uyghurs and other ethnic and religious minorities in Xinjiang.

== Religions and their most common affiliations ==
- Buddhism/Taoism — the Miao (minority), Lisu (minority), Bai, Bulang, Dai, Jinuo, Jing, Jingpo, Mongol, Manchu, Naxi (including Mosuo), Nu, Tai, Tibetan, Zhuang (minority), Yi (minority), and Yugur ("Yellow Uyghurs").
- Eastern Orthodox Christianity — the Russians
- Islam — the Hui, Uyghurs, Kazakhs, Dongxiang people, Kyrgyz people, Salar, Tajiks, Uzbeks, Bonans, and Tatars.
- Judaism — Kaifeng Jews, Sephardic Jews and smaller minorities of Ashkenazi as well as Bukharan Jews.
- Protestant Christianity — the Lisu (70%; see Lisu Church)
- Shamanism/Animism — Daur, Ewenkis, Oroqen, Hezhen, and Derung.

== Ethnic minority representation in the CCP leadership ==
Since the People's Republic of China was established, ethnic minorities have made up around 10% of the CCP Central Committee, whereas the rest of the members are of the Han Chinese ethnic group. That being said, a majority of the ethnic minority members of the Central Committee are alternate members. In the 19th CCP National Congress, only 16 full-time members were ethnic minorities. While only 6 of the 55 ethnic minorities are represented in the Central Committee, the percentage of ethnic minority members in the Central Committee exceeds the percentage of ethnic minority population in China. Ethnic minorities only make up roughly 7.5% of China's population, whereas 92% are Han Chinese, the dominant ethnicity. Even still, the majority of ethnic minorities are severely underrepresented in the Central Committee.

A study conducted by three scholars in 2012, "Getting Ahead in the Communist Party: Explaining the Advancement of Central Committee Members", found that ethnic minorities had an advantage when being considered for promotion in Congress. They explain this phenomenon through the United Front policies that China has been engaged with since the Reform Era. These policies attempt to promote stability and legitimacy among the ethnic minority population through concerted efforts to involve them in the country's politics. Thus the authors argue this is why ethnic minorities enjoyed an advantage in the Reform Period. Other scholars add that the Party is eager to include ethnic minorities in the government because of the backlash that China has faced from the rest of the world concerning the way they treated Tibet and most recently the Uyghurs in Xinjiang. Including ethnic minorities in the Party's leadership adds to the "United Front" that China wants to portray. Though they are included, it remains unclear as to what amount of influence they assert.

In 2020, a survey by Stanford University and the Hoover Institution found that Han Chinese are more supportive of the CCP than are ethnic minorities and that minorities tend to conceal their views of the CCP.

== See also ==
- Affirmative action in China
- Han Chinese subgroups
- China National Ethnic Song and Dance Ensemble
- Chinese nationality law
- Demographics of the People's Republic of China and Taiwan
- Demographics of China § Population density and distribution
- Dzungar genocide
- Ethnic groups in Chinese history
- Racism in China
- Graphic pejoratives in written Chinese
- Human rights in China
- List of Chinese administrative divisions by ethnic group
- List of endangered languages in China
- List of ethnic groups in China
- Minzu University of China, a university in Beijing designated for ethnic minorities.
- Secession in China
- Sinocentrism
- Taiwanese indigenous peoples
- Unrecognized ethnic groups in China
- Persecution of Uyghurs in China
- Zhonghua minzu
