= Arthur Mathews =

Arthur Mathews may refer to:

- Arthur Frank Mathews (1860–1945), American painter
- Arthur Mathews (writer) (born 1959), Irish comedy writer
- Arthur Matthews (politician) (died 1942), Irish Cumann na nGaedhael politician
- Arthur Mathews (missionary), Protestant Christian missionary who served in China
- Arthur Matthews (mathematician) (1848–1911), founding professor at Rhodes University, Grahamstown, South Africa
- Arthur Matthews (rugby league) (1889–?), New Zealand rugby league player
- Arthur John Matthews (1860–1942), principal/president of Arizona State University, then known as the Tempe Normal School
- Arthur Kenneth Mathews (1906–1992), Dean of St Albans
