= Calculator spelling =

Method of writing text on seven-segment displays

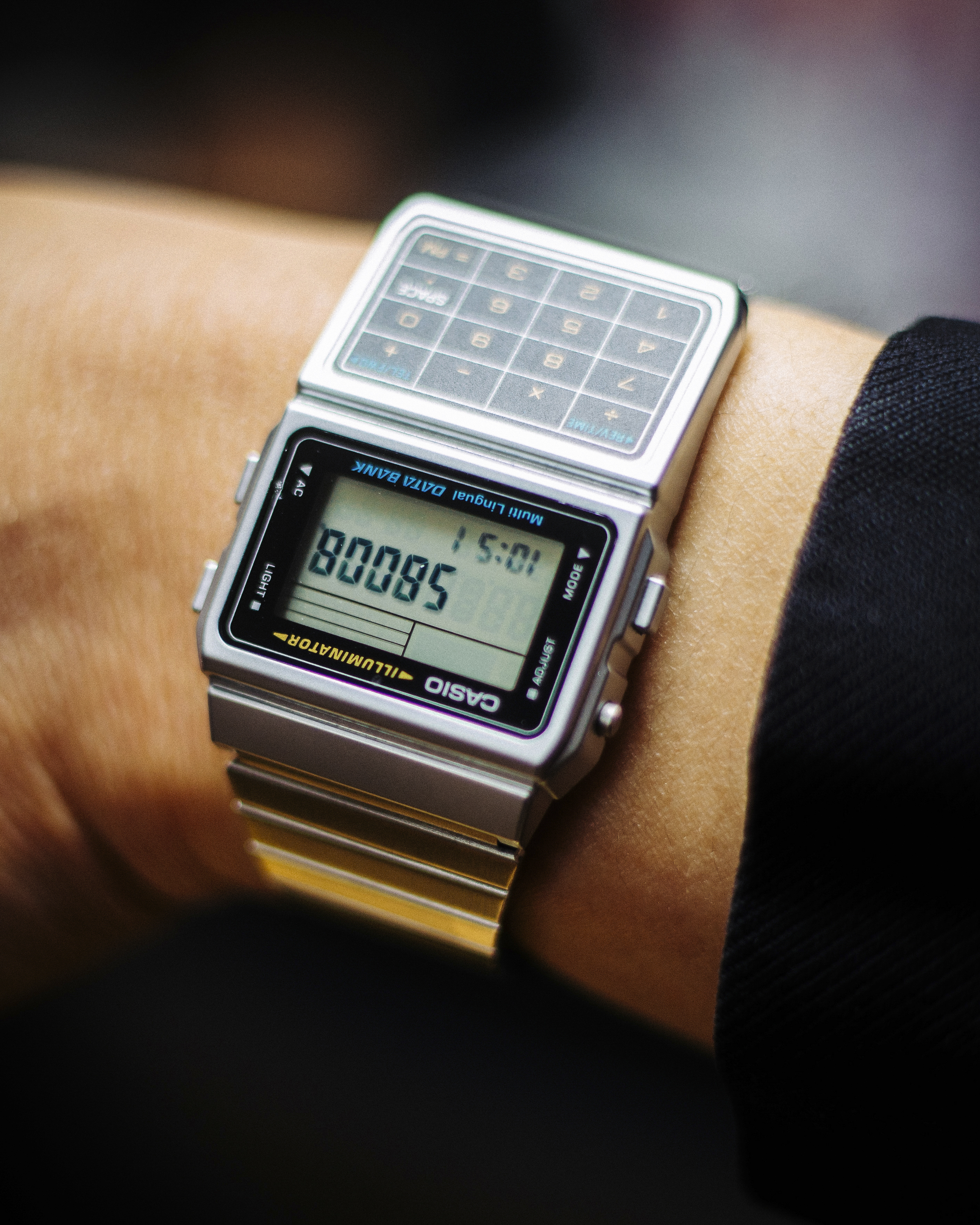
A calculator watch displaying the number 58008, which spells "BOOBS" when viewed upside down.

Calculator spelling is an unintended characteristic of the seven-segment display traditionally used by calculators, in which, when read upside-down, the digits resemble letters of the Latin alphabet. Each digit may be mapped to one or more letters, creating a limited but functional subset of the alphabet, sometimes referred to as beghilos (or beghilosz).

== Applications ==
Aside from novelty and amusement, calculator spelling has limited utility. The popularity of pagers in the 1990s gave rise to a form of leetspeak called "pager-speak." Students, in particular, experimented with calculators to discover new words.

=== English version ===
O	I or l	Z	E	h
S	g	L	B	G
Inverted calculator digits and their letter equivalents

The "original" attributed example of calculator spelling, which dates from the 1970s, is 5318008, which when turned over spells "BOOBIES". Another early example of calculator spelling offered the sequence 0.7734, which becomes "hello", or could also be written as 0.1134. The 1979 album Five Three One - Double Seven O Four by The Hollies encodes the band's name in calculator spelling ("hOLLIES"). Other words possible with the traditional "BEghILOSZ" set include "loose", "shell", "BEIgE", "gOBBLE", "gOOgLE", "BLISS", and many others. Among the longest are "hILLBILLIES" and "SLEIghBELLS" at 11, "gLOSSOLOgIES" and "BIBLIOLOgIES" at 12 letters, and "hEEBEEgEEBEES" at 13 letters, although the latter is not listed under that spelling in the Oxford Dictionary. Fittingly, glossology is the scientific study of language and linguistics. Another common case, 7734206, spells "gO 2 hELL" (or, alternately, 7734209 spells "GO 2 hELL"). 8008 is special in that it can spell "BOOB" upside-down or right-side up. 71077345 spells "SHELLOIL". There are also a couple of names that can be calculator-spelled. For example, 318830=DEBBIE, 7718=BILL, 46137=LEIgh, 5107=LOIS, 31773=ELLIE, 302=ZOE and 451713 317718=BILLIE EILISh.

The calculator spelling 304 eventually entered common slang in the 2020s as a euphemism for a promiscuous woman (hOE, although the traditional spelling of "ho" in that sense lacks an e, and 304 more accurately spells the garden tool).

=== Scientific and programmer calculators ===
Scientific calculators that feature hexadecimal readout offer more flexibility. This allows the letters A through F to also be used (a practice known as hexspeak):

Students often use this capability and the improved "alpha" feature that uses the letters "A" through "Z" to write messages, separating words by using the minus sign ("-") or other punctuation.

In some calculators that use dot matrix displays, a factorial product sign ("!") can be used to add emphasis. For example, "B00B1E5!".

== See also ==
- Ambigram
- ASCII art
- Emoticon
- Hexspeak
- Leetspeak
- Phoneword
- Rotated letter
- Transformation of text

== Bibliography ==
- Hemme, Heinrich. Die Hölle der Zahlen - 92 mathematische Rätsel mit ausführlichen Lösungen (in German). pp. 19, 73.
