= Isobel Miller Kuhn =

Canadian Christian missionary

- Born: Isobel Selina Miller; December 17, 1901; Toronto, Ontario, Canada
- Died: March 20, 1957 (aged 55); Wheaton, Illinois, United States
- Education: University of British Columbia; Normal School; Moody Bible Institute
- Occupation: Missionary
- Spouse: John Becker Kuhn

Isobel Selina Miller Kuhn, born Isobel Selina Miller, also known as "Belle" (December 17, 1901 – March 20, 1957) or Isobel Kuhn, was a Canadian Christian missionary to the Lisu people of Yunnan Province, China, and northern Thailand. She served with the China Inland Mission as a Bible translator, church planter, Bible teacher, and evangelist with her husband John Kuhn. She authored nine books about her experiences.

== Early life ==
=== Family background and education ===
Isobel Selina Miller was born in Toronto, Ontario, Canada, and moved with her family to Vancouver, British Columbia, when she was eleven years old. She was called "Belle" from the time she was a child. Her father was a roentgenologist and a Presbyterian lay preacher at a rescue mission, and her mother was president of the Women's Missionary Society in the Canadian Presbyterian church for many years. Her grandfather was an ordained Presbyterian minister.

Kuhn was raised in a Christian home, although she noted that her childhood lacked any "direct confrontation with [the] living Savior". After an discussion of Christianity with an English professor at the University of British Columbia, who she describes as giving her a "pitying sneer," she became skeptical of the existence of God. She then became agnostic. A young woman who did not drink or smoke, Kuhn recorded being taught by her parents to act respectably and enter into a good marriage with a well-educated and high-status man. While attending university, she entered into a lifetime membership with her college's drama troupe as a freshman, which was considered an uncommon honour at her institution.

=== Conversion and religious calling ===
Although Kuhn she had abandoned Christian teachings by her entry to university, she was still considered a Christian and a respectable woman by many of her surrounding friends and acquaintances. However, she experienced a mental health crisis, becoming suicidal after she discovered that the man to whom she was secretly engaged was being unfaithful. After confronting him, he told her to expect the same treatment in their marriage, and she considered taking her own life. Instead of drinking a bottle of poison from the bathroom medicine cabinet, Kuhn heard the sound of her father sleeping in his bedroom and remembered that he had been a "dear, kind father...." She went back to her bedroom and thought of a Latin quote from a Dante poem, which she believed was translated as "In His will is our peace." She considered that if God did exist, she certainly was not "in His will", and considered if that was the reason why she had no peace.

She then prayed, recording that she knelt "with raised hands to God, to prove to her that He is and to give her peace; and, if He did she would give her whole life to Him - do anything He asked her to do, no matter what He asked - no matter where He asked her to go, for her whole life." Afterward, she decided to study the Gospels and the life of Jesus Christ. She largely hid her faith at the beginning of her conversion, renouncing "worldly" pursuits but struggling to pray often.

=== Education and preparation for missionary work ===
In May 1922, Isobel Kuhn graduated in English Language and Literature with honours from the University of British Columbia. Her intention was to become a university dean and teach as a professor. She taught third grade at the Cecil Rhodes School in Vancouver for more than a year, living in a boarding house because her family had moved to Victoria.

In 1924, while attending her second Christian summer missions conference at the Lake Whatcom Bible & Missionary Conference (now The Firs in Bellingham, Washington), Kuhn met James O. Fraser, the conference speaker and a man who would become one of her most significant spiritual mentors and friends. The following September, Kuhn began studying at Moody Bible Institute in Chicago, Illinois. A staunch Canadian, she did not seek out an American school on her own initiative, but a Christian acquaintance gave Kuhn the train fare and startup money for the first year and requested that she attend the Institute. Before this point, she had begun preparing to become a missionary through night classes at the Vancouver Bible School.

However, she met resistance from her family when she expressed her wishes to them. Kuhn recorded that, at one time, her mother had told her that "the only way this young Christian would become a missionary was over her mother's dead body." This caused Kuhn much anxiety, because, as a Christian, she wanted to honour her mother and father. As she wrote, she was "too young in the Lord to understand that obeying God comes before obeying parents." Ultimately, her mother allowed her to go to Moody. Kuhn's mother died during an operation while Kuhn was in her first semester at Moody, but stated beforehand to a friend that she believed her daughter had "chosen the better way."

At Moody, she became focused on the Tibeto-Burman Lisu people on the China-Burma border after hearing Mr. Frasier speak at the Lake Whatcom Bible & Missionary Conference, and being convinced that was what God wanted her to do. Although she missed a semester of school because of illness, she graduated from Moody as valedictorian in December, 1926. At the school she had participated in open-air preaching, playing piano at a boy's reformatory, and working in neighborhood visitation ministries. She also worked through school to pay her tuition and expenses, though she also received unexpected financial support when it was needed. At Moody she also met her future husband, John Becker Kuhn, whom she once called "another dreamer". He had started school a year earlier than Kuhn and went to China alone upon graduation, as was the mission's counsel at the time; unmarried partners could be separated when only one of them had been accepted by the mission.

=== Application to China Inland Mission ===
Once graduated, Kuhn applied to the China Inland Mission, but was rejected at first because of a negative character reference. But after further review and almost a two-year wait - which included both a delay until the "foreign uprising of 1927" cooled down (likely the Nanchang Uprising and Nanking incident of 1927) and an additional six-month delay ordered by the mission due to Kuhn's previous overwork and health status - Kuhn left for China.

During the near-two years Kuhn waited for her passage, she lived with her father and brother who had both moved back to Vancouver. She needed to earn a living because her father was unwilling to support his daughter's mission endeavours financially, though he supported her decision to become a missionary. She initially hesitated to work as a teacher again, as she was concerned that being bound by a contract would limit her ability to quit suddenly and leave for China. She instead took an unexpected, unpaid speaking engagement before a women's group and, to her surprise, was asked to be the superintendent of what was then called "Vancouver Girls' Corner Club" for $80 a month. The club was an evangelistic outreach program for professional women, who met in downtown Vancouver during the work week to talk and eat lunch together. The superintendent's responsibilities included being available for the women and to evangelize when possible. For Kuhn, it was a paid position that she grew to enjoy, but could resign from at a moment's notice.

== Tenure in China ==
Kuhn eventually received passage to leave, and her ship left out of Vancouver to China on October 11, 1928. As a new missionary, she experienced significant cultural shock from things such as from the poverty, the vermin, the traditional Lisu diet and the crowds. In these times, she would "fall on her knees and weep before the Lord," asking Him to help her. She eventually found ways to cope with certain irritations, like fleas, and grew to enjoy certain things she initially disliked, like "large chunks" of boiled pork fat and bean curd. She married John Kuhn in Kunming, the capital of Yunnan Province, on November 4, 1929.

Over the next twenty-four years they served together alongside her mentor, J. O. Fraser, who came before them and worked alongside them until 1938. However, John Kuhn's leadership duties (and eventually his China Inland Mission (CIM) superintendent duties) separated him from them frequently for periods up to a year throughout all of their ministry in China. The Kuhns first ministered in Chengchiang, Yunnan, from 1929-1930, and in Tali [Dali], Yunnan, which had been without missionaries for the previous year from 1930-1932. While in Tali, the Kuhns had a baby girl, Kathryn Ann, in April, 1931. They then ministered in Yongping, Yunnan, a mostly Muslim area, from 1932 to 1934. The Kuhns lived in an area of the city that had a lower percentage of Muslims. They ministered among the Lisu people, in China, from 1934 until 1950.

In 1936, after 16 months of ministering in "Lisuland," the Kuhns took their first furlough to see both their families in Manheim and Vancouver respectively. John had been on the mission field for 10 years, Isobel for eight.

The family then returned to China, and in late 1937, the 6-year-old Kathryn began boarding school in the CIM Shandong Province school. However, she was then taken to a Japanese detention camp in 1941 and J.O. Fraser's widow served as her surrogate mother. In 1942, the Kuhns started a Bible school for girls and an additional one for boys the following year. Isobel Kuhn had their second child, Daniel, in August 1943. In October 1944, the Kuhn family was reunited with 13-year-old daughter Kathryn in Pennsylvania, as in late 1943 she had been returned to the US after almost 6 years in a prisoner of war exchange.

The communist revolution in China then forced Kuhn and her son Danny to leave the country in March 1950, and to put her missionary life on hold for two years. John Kuhn left China 18 months after his wife. While on furlough, the Kuhns spent their time in Wheaton, Illinois, as their daughter was studying at Wheaton College.

The Kuhns then returned to Asia to continue their ministry in 1952 among another Lisu group, in northern Thailand. In 1954, they retired after Isobel Kuhn was diagnosed with cancer.

== Death and family legacy ==
After Isobel's 1954 cancer diagnosis, the Kuhns returned to the United States and settled back in Wheaton, Illinois, where twelve year old Daniel (1943-2022), who had been in a home for missionary children, was thrilled to be reunited with his mother. Along with enjoying time with her family, she continued to write and published several books. Isobel died on March 20, 1957, with her husband at her side. Her funeral was held at Wheaton College Church.

As a widower, John went back to the field in Thailand the next year, where he met and married Eileen O’Rourke (1925-2021) in 1958.Eileen was a great comfort and a lifelong friend to his and Isobel's children, Kathryn and Daniel.John, with Eileen, devoted his remaining seven and a half years to reaching the lost in Thailand; he died in March 1966.Eileen continued working among minority groups and students in Asia over the next 44 years.

Three generations of John and Isabel Kuhn's family have served in the Far East mission field. Daughter, Kathryn née Kuhn Rulison (1931-2000), married missionary, Don Rulison (1916-2012). They labored in the Chinese Hmong mission field for over 40 years. After Kathryn's death, the children’s ministry Kathy's Home, was started in memorial. Her husband continued in Chiang Mai Thailand until his death at the age of 96. Their three children, grandchildren of Kuhn, serve in Thailand with Kathy's Home or the Christian ministry Global Recordings Network.

== Legacy ==
By the beginning of the 21st centurt, the Salween River valley housed a high Christian population. Of the 18,000 Lisu who lived in Fugong, Yunnan, in 1950, 3,400 were recorded as having professed faith in Christ. As of 2007, it was estimated that 80-90 per cent of a population of 70,000 were Christian. In Yunnan, it is estimated that there are between 100,000 to 200,000 Lisu Christians in total. More than 75,000 Lisu Bibles have been legally printed in China following this growth.

Today, this Christian presence in the Lisu communities of China is attributed by certain missionary and Christian groups to Isobel Kuhn and her "Rainy Season Bible School." This was a school that was formed to address the disruption of daily life caused by the monsoon season in the heavily agricultural area where the Kuhns ministered. Kuhn formed a plan to hold classes during this agricultural down time to preach the Gospel and teach the Lisu the basics of the Christian faith. These classes were taught by Kuhn and others. From these classes, a number of men then became evangelists and pastors throughout China.

Kuhn's autobiographical and biographical missionary writings are still in print over fifty years after they were first published.

== Quotes ==
About Isobel Kuhn's life early on when she forsook Christianity, she wrote:

At the end of my walk home, I came to the conclusion that I would henceforth accept no theories of life which I had not proved personally. And, quite ignorant of where that attitude would lead me, I had unconsciously stepped off the High Way where man walks with his face lifted Godward and the pure, piney scents of the heights call him upward, on to The Misty Flats [original]. The in-between level place of easy-going - nothing very good attempted, yet nothing bad either - where men walk in the mist, telling each other that no one can see these things clearly. The Misty Flats where sheep would graze the in-betweeners drift to and fro - life has no end but amusement and no purpose - where the herd drift with the strongest pull and there is no reason for opposing anything. Therefore they had a kind of peace and mutual link which they call tolerance.

Of her brief Bible school years, Kuhn reflects:

....I received more blessing through the devotion and fire of my fellow [missionary] students at Moody than I did even through my studies. I thank God for them. After graduation we scattered, and many I did not see again for twenty or thirty years. But, when we did meet, what a joy to find their passion for Christ as fervent as in student days! And what a thrill to hear from their lips that the dreams of student days had been fulfilled by a gentle, kind Master! He had inspired our dreams and His callings had been justified.

One of Kuhn's quips about her missionary years with the Lisu:

When I get to heaven they aren't going to see much of me but my heels, for I'll be hanging over the golden wall keeping an eye on the Lisu church!

== Works ==
- Kuhn, Isobel (1957). By Searching. China Inland Mission, Overseas Missionary Fellowship. ISBN 978-0853630111.
- Kuhn, Isobel (2009-06-01) [1959]. By Searching: My Journey Through Doubt Into Faith. Moody Publishers. ISBN 9781575675107. (Autobiography. Part 1)
- Kuhn, Isobel (2012-07-28) [1958]. In the Arena. Whitefish, Montana: Literary Licensing, LLC. ISBN 978-1258447311. (Autobiography. Part 2)
- Green Leaf in Drought - Time, Moody Press (1957) ISBN 9971-972-73-5 (The story of Arthur & Wilda Matthews, the last CIM missionaries to leave China.)
- Stones of Fire, China Inland Mission (1951) ISBN 9971-972-76-X
- Ascent to the Tribes: Pioneering in North Thailand, Moody Press (1956) ISBN 0-85363-136-0
- Precious Things of the Lasting Hills, China Inland Mission (1963) ISBN 0-85363-044-5
- Children of the Hills, OMF International (1999) (Formerly called, Precious Things....)
- Second-Mile People, OMF Books (December 1982)
- Nests Above the Abyss, Moody Press (1964)
- Kuhn, Isobel (2001-05-28). Tewksbury, M.E. (ed.). Whom God Has Joined: Sketches from a Marriage in Which God is First. Littleton, Colorado: Overseas Missionary Fellowship Inc. ISBN 9781929122110.

Some later editions of Kuhn's works have been edited and revised by others.

== See also ==
- Historical Bibliography of the China Inland Mission
