= Transformation of text =

Methods for geometric modification of computer text

Transformations of text are strategies to perform geometric transformations on text (reversal, rotations, etc.), particularly in systems that do not natively support transformation, such as HTML, seven-segment displays and plain text.

== Implementation ==
Many systems, such as HTML, seven-segment displays and plain text, do not support transformation of text. In the case of HTML, this limitation in display may eventually be addressed through standard cascading style sheets (CSS), since proposed specifications for CSS3 include rotation for block elements. In the meantime, several ways of producing the visual effects of text transformations have come into use.

Text rotated 90º using CSS
Rotated text Horizontally mirrored text using CSS
Mirrored text Vertically mirrored text using CSS
Mirrored text

The most common of these transformations are rotation and reflection.

Unicode supports a variety of characters that resemble transformed characters, primarily for various forms of phonetic transcription. Each of these character names indicates what kind of transformation the characters have undergone:

- Reversed characters, those that have been reflected in a vertical line, or flipped horizontally, like certain Cyrillic script letters;
- Inverted characters, those that have been reflected on a horizontal line (i.e., flipped vertically, rare);
- Turned characters, those that have been rotated 180 degrees and thus appear upside-down (this is the most common);
- Sideways characters, those that have been rotated 90 degrees counterclockwise (generally the least supported, and used only for a handful of vowels in the Uralic Phonetic Alphabet system).

=== Upside-down text ===
Strategies can be used to render words upside down in languages such as HTML that do not permit rotation of text; using Unicode characters (especially those in the IPA), a very close approximation of upside-down text (also called flip text) can be achieved. The letters s, x, z, and o are rotationally symmetrical, while pairs such as b/q, d/p, and n/u are rotations of each other. Historically, capital J in early forms of italic type was designed in such a way that it could be turned upside down to render a pound sign, £. The rest of the letters have been encoded into the Unicode IPA section, generating a complete set of upside-down lowercase letters. With the addition of the Fraser alphabet to the Unicode standard in version 5.2, full (or at least near-full) support for upside-down capital letters is now available. Number support is incomplete; four numbers are universally strobogrammatic (0, 8, and 6/9), and the upside-down versions of numbers 2 and 3 have been assigned Unicode points for use in dozenal notation in Unicode 8.0. Segment display representations of the ten decimal digits were added to the Unicode standard in version 13.0 as part of the Symbols for Legacy Computing block, providing symmetrical versions of 1 and 5 (as well as alternate options for 0, 2, 8 and 6/9); this leaves 4 and 7 as the last two decimal digits not yet directly supported. The open-source Unicode typeface Quivira includes an upside-down 1 in its Private Use Area for the purpose of encoding texts that use a turned one as a numeral representing –1 in balanced ternary and similar signed-digit numeral systems. Punctuation (by use of such characters as the interpunct and the inverted question mark and exclamation point) is mostly covered. Several Internet utilities exist for the transformation of regular text to (and sometimes from) upside-down text; each has its own slightly different algorithm for letters not precisely or well covered.

Below is a conversion table that can be used to transform lowercase, uppercase numeric and punctuation output. These characters require Unicode version 13.0 minimum (in particular the 2 and 3 from the duodecimal block and the 🯱 and 🯵 from the segmented display block).

Lowercase Letters	z	ʎ	x	ʍ	ʌ	n	ʇ	s	ɹ	b	d	o	u	ɯ	ꞁ	ʞ	ſ̣	ᴉ	ɥ	ᵷ	ɟ	ǝ	p	ɔ	q	ɐ
Lowercase Letters	007A	028E	0078	028D	028C	006E	0287	0073	0279	0062	0064	006F	0075	026F	A781	029E	017F+0323	1D09	0265	0253	025F	01DD	0070	0254	0071	0250
Capital Letters	Z	⅄	X	𐤵	Ʌ	Ո	Ʇ	S	ꓤ	Ꝺ	Ԁ	O	N	ꟽ	⅂	Ʞ	ꓩ	I	H	⅁	Ⅎ	Ǝ	ꓷ	Ɔ	ꓭ	Ɐ
Capital Letters	005A	2144	0058	10935	0245	0548	A7B1	0053	A4E4	A779	0500	004F	004E	A7FD	A780	A7B0	A4E9	0049	0048	2141	2132	018E	A4F7	0186	A4ED	2C6F
Numbers	0	6	8	𝘓	9	🯵	߈	↋	↊	🯱																
Numbers	0030	0036	0038	1D613	0039	1FBF5	07C8	218B	218A	1FBF1																
Punctuation	⅋	‾	¿	¡	„	,	˙	'	؛																	
Punctuation	214B	203E	00BF	00A1	201E	002C	02D9	0027	061B																	

=== Sideways text ===
Sideways text presents a unique problem. Unlike rotating text 180 degrees, the number of sideways characters falls far short of what would be needed for most purposes, and because text is rendered horizontally, it would be very difficult to render beyond one line of vertical text in a well-aligned manner without columns, especially in proportional fonts (furthermore, each character would require a line break after it). The process of using alternate characters for sideways text is further complicated by the fact that most fonts space letters further apart vertically (to accommodate underlining and overlining) than horizontally, and that most fonts are taller than they are wider, making simulated sideways text look significantly more awkward.

Until CSS3 introduced rotation for block elements, there was no direct way to rotate text at any direction other than the manual 180-degree method described above. Internet Explorer offered a proprietary CSS property that rotated text 90 degrees clockwise. It was intended to render Chinese ideographs in traditional vertical orientation; when used for non-Chinese scripts, it rendered the entire text rotated 90 degrees. This property was revised and is now incorporated into CSS: <div style="writing-mode:vertical-rl;"> There remain some inconsistencies in how the writing-mode property is implemented; rotation can also cause some issues with a given element's width, height and word wrapping.

The most common way around these problems was to use images of text, which can then be rotated and transformed in an image editor at will, and to represent the text in those images with the alt attribute so that search engines and text-only browsers can read it properly. The use of ANSI art and box-drawing characters to manually draw sideways text has the advantage of being copiable and pastable (whereas images are not in most plain text situations), but generally creates large characters and is not generally readable by search engines. With the broader adoption of CSS3 by all of the major browsers, these methods are now mostly obsolete for Web media.

=== Reversed text ===
Though less widespread, text can also be reversed to be a mirror image of itself. Letters A, H, I, M, O/o, T, U, V/v, W/w, X/x, Y, and in some fonts i and l are symmetrical in the y-axis; the pairs of b/d and p/q transform to each other. The letters И, Я, and г from Cyrillic, among other sources, are among the numerous characters that can be used to further generate this effect. Reversed text can use capital letters mixed with lowercase, as opposed to the strict lowercase used by upside-down transformation (upside-down lowercase and capital letters do not generally align as they would upright, though reversed letters do).

X-axis symmetry is visible in the letters B, C, D, E, H, I, K, O, X, and in some fonts a and l, as well as in the pairs of a/g, b/p, d/q, e/G, and f/t. Expanding to Cyrillic and Greek produces more symmetries, such as Λ/V and Γ/L.

The Fixedsys Excelsior typeface includes a complete set of reversed characters like this in its Private Use Area. However, online utilities to create mirrored text are not readily available, and most sites that claim to "mirror text" or "reverse text" in fact only change the order of the letters and do not actually flip the letters themselves.

== Dilated text ==
Through the use of Unicode's small capitals, small-form punctuation, and subscript and superscript phonetic modifiers, text can be created that is smaller than the inline text. This is generally only necessary for applications that only support one-size plain text since HTML and CSS support different text sizes. With fonts that support the Medieval Unicode Font Initiative's character set, which contains a full set of large-size lowercase glyphs, text that is larger than the inline text can also be expressed.

== Examples ==
Name Year	ᘏ 𝄩 ᘏ 𝄩	ᗜ ⊂ ᔕ ⊣ ⤙	ᓚ ⊂ ᗜ 𝄩 ⊣ ェ	ϖ 𝄩 ᘏ ᘏ ᔕ
2018	✔			✔
2019		✔		✔
2020	✔		✔	✔
Example table with sideways text using Unicode characters

- Artistry, such as representing the two end zones or player designations on an American football gridiron; e.g. "sɹəꞁəəʇS ɥᵷɹnqsʇʇᴉԀ"^{from this example} or "sʇuɐᴉᵷ ʞɹo⅄ ʍəN ƕ" (note the use of hwair as a dingbat of the team's logo).
- Emoticons are traditionally drawn sideways in North America.
- Better fit; for instance, rotating column headers on a table sideways would produce a more compact table, desirable particularly in tables that contain mostly abbreviations and numeric values.
- Evoking Russian stereotypes, by flipping certain letters one at a time.
- Evoking simplicity, such as childlike confusion over the direction of a letter (e.g., "Toys Я Us").
- Symmetry, such as in the wordmarks for Nine Inch Nails (NIИ), ABBA (AꓭBA), or The Rush Limbaugh Show "EIB" slogan (εıз). The use of transformation in this fashion is known as an ambigram.
- Calculator spelling on seven-segment displays, where numbers represent letters upside down (e.g. 07734,, "hello").
- Emulating the boustrophedon style of writing, where alternating lines are written in opposite directions.
- Pentominoes and tetrominoes resemble (and are traditionally named after) Latin letters, and the rotation of these letterlike objects forms the basis of several games, including Tetris.
- Though not strict transformation, the substitution of a plural "s" with its near-reflection "z" is a fairly common trope among some minor league sports teams in the United States, in order to make team names seem more modern.
- Basic encryption, to "hide" the answer to a joke or puzzle, for instance:

Question: How can you tell an introvert from an extrovert?
Answer: ˙sǝoɥs s,ʎnᵷ ɹǝɥʇo ǝɥʇ ʇɐ sʞooꞁ ʇɹǝʌoɹʇxǝ ǝɥʇ 'sɹoʇɐʌǝlǝ ǝɥʇ uı (Using the Revfad algorithm)
Or: 'saoys s.hn6 R3HTO ayt te skool tJa^oJtxa ayt 'sJote^ala ayt uI (using the Albartus USD algorithm)

- In baseball scorekeeping, a player who strikes out despite not swinging at the third strike is indicated in the official scorebook with a reversed or turned K. It has been added to Unicode in version 7.0 at U+A7B0 (Ʞ).
- On the Soundgarden album Superunknown, all mention of the album or title track (except in the lyrics booklet) is shown as "Superиmoиʞи∩".
- The beverage 7Up during the early 2000s had a spin-off counterpart, known as dnL, with a significantly different color and flavor as well as caffeine.
- Facebook added "upside-down English" as a language choice in summer 2009.

Example of reversed text reflected along a y-axis:

Example:...иiɒəɒ иɘqo x иoiƨиɘмib oɟ lɒɟɿoq ɘнɟ ɟʇɘl γbodɘмoƧ (Somebody left the portal to Dimension X open again...)

Poet Darius Bacon has written two examples of palindromic poetry that reads the same upside-down as it does rightside up.

=== Russian ===
Question: How do flamingos get their color?
Answer: ¿ɯǝʚǹ и̯oʚɔ ɯoıɐhʎvou oɹниꟺɐvф 𝼐ɐ𝼐

== See also ==
- Ambigrams often play with perceptual shifts of inverted and rotated text.
