= Lisu Christianity =

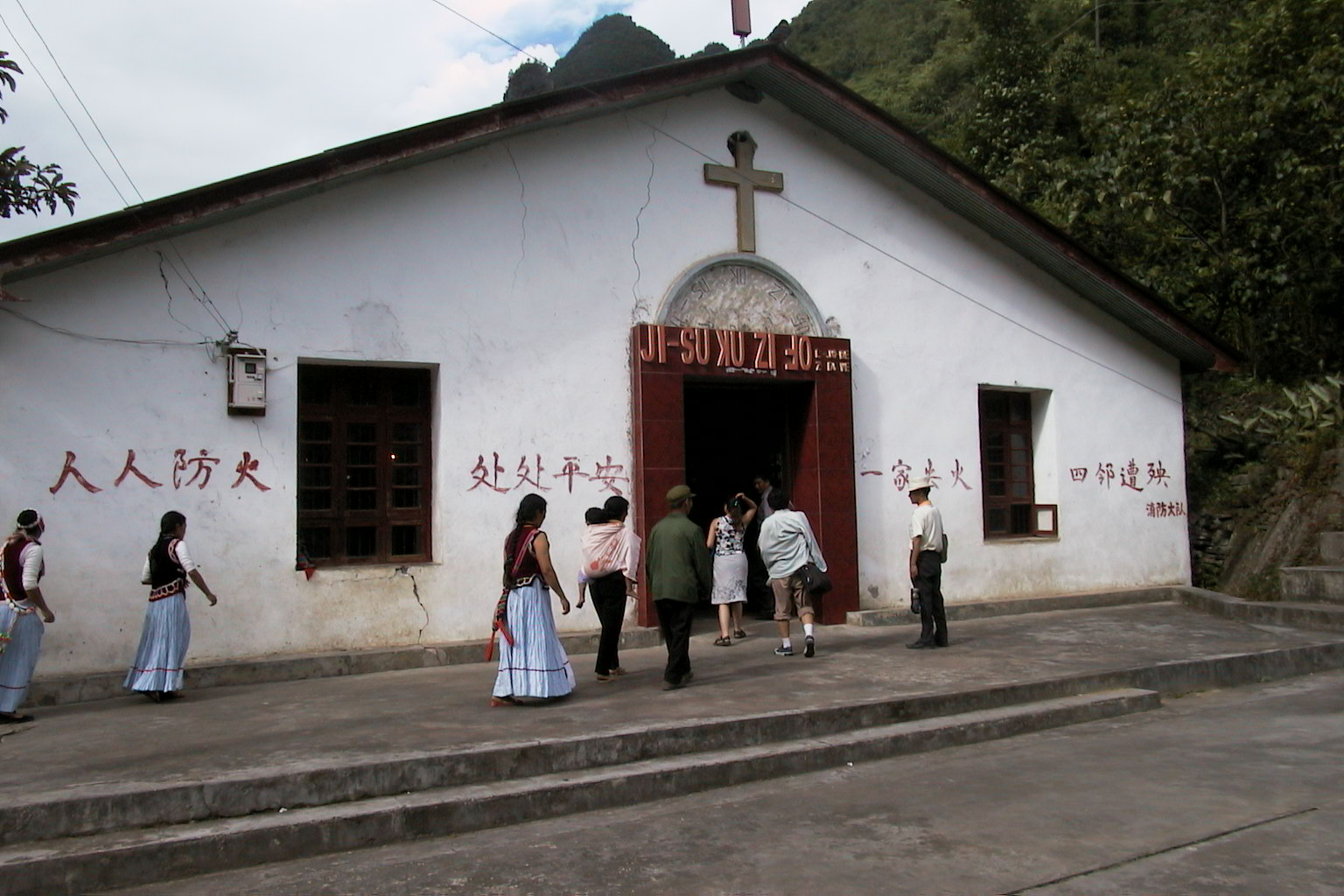
Lisu Church at Fugong

Lisu Church is a Christian church of an ethnic minority of southwestern China, Myanmar, Thailand and a part of India. The Chinese government's State Administration for Religious Affairs has proposed considering Christianity the official religion of the Lisu.

== History ==
Christian missionaries worked in the Lisu area from the early 20th century. The first to work among the Lisu, in the Yunnan province in China, was James O. Fraser with the China Inland Mission; he also developed the written Lisu language and the Fraser Alphabet, which has been officially adopted by the Chinese government. Reading and writing in Lisu was mainly developed by the church and, in some villages, the membership of the Christian church comprises far more than half the population. The Lisu Church has both the Holy Bible and a Christian hymn book in its own language. As an originally orally-based culture, Lisu hymn singing has become a centerpiece in Lisu Christian worship and practice.

The Chinese Lisu Church has training centers for evangelists in Fugong and Lushui. Lisu pastors are trained at the Theological University of Kunming. There is a shortage of pastors in the Lisu churches, according to representatives of the church. The church is part of the official Protestant Church of China, the Three-Self Patriotic Movement. Sunday church services take place mainly in Lisu.

Of the 18,000 Lisu who lived in Fugong in 1950 – 3,400 adhered to the Christian faith. As of 2007, it was estimated that 80–90 percent of the 70,000 professed the Christian faith. It is estimated that there are now nearly 300,000 total Lisu Christians. More than 75,000 Lisu Bibles have been legally printed in China following this growth.

== See also ==
- Historical Bibliography of the China Inland Mission
