= Gandhigram, Arunachal Pradesh =

Gandhigram Shidi
- Village
- Location in Arunachal Pradesh, India Gandhigram (India)
- Coordinates: 27.2762018°N 96.9131254°E
- Country: India
- State: Arunachal Pradesh
- District: Changlang

Population (2011)
  - Total: 1,754

Languages
  - Official: English
- Time zone: UTC+5:30 (IST)
- PIN: 792055
- ISO 3166 code: IN-AR
- Vehicle registration: AR
- Coastline: 0 kilometres (0 mi)
- Nearest city: Miao (Town about 157 km)
- Climate: cold (Köppen)

Gandhigram, locally known as Shidi, is a village inhabited by Lisu people in Vijoynagar circle, Changlang district, Arunachal Pradesh, India. The population was 1,754 at the 2011 Indian census. There is a road connectivity to the nearest town, Miao, and it takes around 7-8 hours to reach there by road. Internet facility is also now set here.

== Education ==
The village has a government middle school established in 1961 and the newly-established Katha Lisu School, with class I and preceding Nursery and KG classes and an enrollment of about 200 students.
