= List of Chinese provincial-level divisions by ethnic group =

The list below outlines the distribution of the nationalities of China among provinces and province-level entities of the People's Republic of China (P.R.C.) according to the census of 2020. The provinces and province-level entities are listed by region. The classification of ethnic groups follows the official classification of the PRC.

Some ethnic groups, for instance, Mosuo people, although classified as Nakhi, do not regard themselves as part of any of the 56 groups identified by the PRC government. Some scholars made hypothesis that they are descendants of Mongols.

Excluded from this list is the Republic of China, which administers Taiwan and a fraction of Fujian Provinces. Please refer to Demographics of Taiwan for more information. The two special administrative regions (S.A.R.) of the P.R.C., namely Hong Kong and Macau, are not part of mainland China are also excluded. Please refer to Demographics of Hong Kong and Demographics of Macau.

Autonomous regions are marked with an asterisk (*).

== Northern ==
Ethnic groups	Beijing		Tianjin		Hebei		Shanxi		Inner Mongolia* (Western leagues)	
Ethnic groups	Number	%	Number	%	Number	%	Number	%	Number	%
Han	20,845,166	95.2	13,422,528	96.8	71,389,092	95.7	34,793,761	99.7	11,884,860	88.2
Manchu	469,995	2.1	128,430	0.9	2,269,227	3.0	17,269		125,724	0.9
Mongol	123,340	0.6	41,736	0.3	226,047	0.3	9,434		1,276,842	9.5
Hui (Muslim)	274,112	1.3	166,920	1.2	567,106	0.8	60,803	0.2	145,492	1.1
Miao	18,054	0.1	12,975	0.1	26,976		7,507		5,081	
Korean	32,984	0.2	16,257	0.1	16,184		1,041		3,773	
Tujia	29,580	0.1	12,554	0.1	18,728		4,845		4,143	
Zhuang	21,288	0.1	15,350	0.1	25,552		2,728		2,047	
Yi	9,997		7,826		12,113		5,534		3,603	
Bouyei	4,572		4,401		12,432		1,111		2,095	
2020 Census	21,893,095		13,866,009		74,610,235		34,915,616		13,480,216	

== Northeast ==
Ethnic groups	Liaoning		Jilin		Heilongjiang		Inner Mongolia* (4 Eastern leagues)	
Ethnic groups	Number	%	Number	%	Number	%	Number	%
Han	36,169,617	84.9	21,985,839	91.3	30,728,612	96.5	7,050,677	66.7
Manchu	5,085,984	11.9	831,418	3.5	583,807	1.8	344,010	3.3
Mongol	677,760	1.6	169,449	0.7	112,210	0.4	2,970,973	28.1
Korean	229,158	0.5	940,165	3.9	270,123	0.8	14,443	0.1
Hui (Muslim)	216,379	0.5	104,595	0.4	75,464	0.2	69,426	0.7
Xibe	127,561	0.3	4,238		6,259		2,501	
Daur	3,240		1,207		33,670	0.1	65,532	0.6
Evenki	688		230		2,560		26,153	0.2
Miao	14,378		5,788		3,852		4,325	
Tujia	10,080		4,232		3,709		1,969	
2020 Census	42,591,407		24,073,453		31,850,088		10,568,939	

== Eastern ==
Ethnic groups	Shanghai		Jiangsu		Zhejiang		Anhui		Fujian		Jiangxi		Shandong	
Ethnic groups	Number	%	Number	%	Number	%	Number	%	Number	%	Number	%	Number	%
Han	24,471,085	98.4	84,126,802	99.3	62,349,874	96.6	60,594,623	99.3	40,418,616	97.3	44,969,369	99.5	100,622,494	99.1
Hui (Muslim)	84,925	0.3	140,119	0.2	84,882	0.1	297,740	0.5	128,591	0.3	15,923		552,215	0.5
Miao	38,916	0.2	87,900	0.1	569,407	0.9	24,975		168,928	0.4	25,489	0.1	29,730	
She	4,476		3,179		182,507	0.3	2,141		374,663	0.9	74,072	0.2	964	
Tujia	41,807	0.2	63,406	0.1	318,881	0.5	14,981		142,673	0.3	16,527		16,532	
Bouyei	9,914		40,073		313,023	0.5	8,052		48,893	0.1	7,519		9,627	
Yi	21,952	0.1	47,316	0.1	155,681	0.2	15,844		53,930	0.1	9,335		26,888	
Zhuang	27,531	0.1	31,498		122,792	0.2	12,337		53,350	0.1	15,977		12,074	
Dong	11,870		24,413		146,773	0.2	6,119		31,784	0.1	7,353		8,722	
Manchu	43,197	0.2	35,520		32,159		12,067		14,034		6,785		79,806	0.1
2020 Census	24,870,895		84,748,016		64,567,588		61,027,171		41,540,086		45,188,635		101,527,453	

== Central-Southern ==
Ethnic groups	Henan		Hubei		Hunan		Guangdong		Guangxi*		Hainan	
Ethnic groups	Number	%	Number	%	Number	%	Number	%	Number	%	Number	%
Han	98,210,038	98.8	54,981,458	95.2	59,759,648	89.9	121,260,372	96.2	31,318,824	62.5	8,498,241	84.3
Zhuang	10,758		24,633		45,495	0.1	2,017,275	1.6	15,721,956	31.4	61,000	0.6
Tujia	12,996		2,285,834	4.0	2,713,005	4.1	430,936	0.3	19,105		8,273	0.1
Miao	12,797		214,062	0.4	2,027,034	3.1	612,699	0.5	578,122	1.2	87,733	0.9
Yao	2,121		5,410		749,872	1.1	514,447	0.4	1,683,038	3.4	10,000	0.1
Dong	3,291		62,725	0.1	865,518	1.3	241,790	0.2	362,580	0.7	5,398	0.1
Li	1,191		3,289		3,169		32,382		6,491		1,355,074	13.4
Hui (Muslim)	948,553	1.0	76,423	0.1	82,786	0.1	88,346	0.1	35,347	0.1	17,089	0.2
Bouyei	4,308		7,982		9,578		229,366	0.2	31,303	0.1	6,800	0.1
Mulao	258		772		1,369		29,190		180,185	0.4	411	
2020 Census	99,365,519		57,752,557		66,444,864		126,012,510		50,126,804		10,081,232	

Ethnic groups	Hong Kong	
Ethnic groups	Number	%
Chinese	6,793,502	91.6
Filipino	201,291	2.7
Indonesian	142,065	1.9
Mixed	66,732	0.9
White	61,582	0.8
Indian	42,569	0.6
Nepalese	29,701	0.4
Pakistani	24,385	0.3
Thai	12,972	0.2
Japanese	10,291	0.1
Korean	8,700	0.1
2021 Census	7,413,070	

Ethnic groups	Macau	
Ethnic groups	Number	%
Chinese	608,379	89.2
Filipino	33,896	5.0
Vietnamese	12,217	1.8
Portuguese	8,991	1.3
Indonesian	5,859	0.9
Thai	762	0.1
2021 Census	682,070	

== Southwest ==
Ethnic groups	Chongqing		Sichuan		Guizhou		Yunnan		Tibet*	
Ethnic groups	Number	%	Number	%	Number	%	Number	%	Number	%
Han	29,883,369	93.2	77,986,638	93.2	24,511,882	63.6	31,573,245	66.9	443,370	12.2
Yi	15,901		3,191,470	3.8	959,302	2.5	5,071,002	10.7	3,238	0.1
Miao	512,933	1.6	182,569	0.2	4,506,912	11.7	1,253,291	2.7	1,307	
Tibetan	5,625		1,604,629	1.9	2,901		147,935	0.3	3,137,901	86.0
Tujia	1,546,988	4.8	87,912	0.1	1,696,664	4.4	23,811	0.1	2,019	0.1
Bouyei	9,558		16,829		2,710,606	7.0	68,140	0.1	406	
Bai	3,233		13,321		214,802	0.6	1,603,728	3.4	2,287	0.1
Dong	7,757		9,211		1,650,871	4.3	8,341		322	
Hani	2,072		4,109		2,539		1,632,981	3.5	149	
Zhuang	10,616		23,631		67,845	0.2	1,209,837	2.6	468	
Dai	1,393		9,924		2,097		1,259,419	2.7	126	
Hui (Muslim)	10,032		111,280	0.1	204,962	0.5	737,548	1.6	25,487	0.7
Lisu	673		23,477		961		705,203	1.5	318	
Undistinguished	2,069		1,968		698,234	1.8	23,822	0.1	4,204	0.1
Gelao	7,660		3,972		550,322	1.4	4,933		125	
2020 Census	32,054,159		83,674,866		38,562,148		47,209,277		3,648,100	

== Northwest ==
Ethnic groups	Shaanxi		Gansu		Qinghai		Ningxia*		Xinjiang*	
Ethnic groups	Number	%	Number	%	Number	%	Number	%	Number	%
Han	39,306,255	99.4	22,363,438	89.4	2,993,534	50.5	4,612,964	64.0	10,920,098	42.2
Uyghur	4,722		3,073		312		1,380		11,624,257	45.0
Hui (Muslim)	140,202	0.4	1,342,385	5.4	946,273	16.0	2,523,581	35.0	1,102,928	4.3
Tibetan	9,200		519,927	2.1	1,509,608	25.5	1,481		18,276	0.1
Kazakh	817		4,249		609		275		1,539,636	6.0
Dongxiang	1,115		652,119	2.6	14,459	0.2	1,324		72,036	0.3
Mongol	10,453		11,946		102,447	1.7	9,499	0.1	169,143	0.7
Tu	844		33,691	0.1	200,362	3.4	461		3,827	
Kyrgyz	166		119		7		37		199,264	0.8
Salar	937		15,807	0.1	128,779	2.2	138		4,525	
2020 Census	39,528,999		25,019,831		5,923,957		7,202,654		25,852,345	

== See also ==
- Autonomous regions of China
- List of ethnic groups in China
- Taiwanese indigenous peoples
