= J Yaw Wu =

Burmese politician

Member of the Amyotha Hluttaw
- Incumbent
- Assumed office 3 February 2016
- Deputy: 1 February 2021
- Constituency: Kachin State № 1
- Majority: 13526 votes

Personal details
- Born: 14 April 1969 (age 57) Putao, Kachin State, Myanmar
- Party: National Unity Party
- Parent(s): Phuu Yeh Dwae (father); Harr Nar (mother)
- Education: 2nd Year R.I.T, BSc (Maths), B.A (Psy& Philo) B.Th, Dip in Therapeutic formation

J Yaw Wu (Burmese: ဂျေယောဝ, born 14 April 1969) is a Burmese politician who is an Amyotha Hluttaw MP for Kachin State No. 1 constituency. He is a member of the National Unity Party.

== Early life and education ==
J was born on 14 April 1969 in Putao, Kachin State, Myanmar. He is an ethnic Lisu. From 1986 to 1988, he studied at Rangoon Institute of Technology (RIT) for 2nd years. He graduated with BSc (Maths), B.Ab (Psy& Philo) from Myanmar Institute of Theology, Pyin Oo Lwin, and B.Th from Myanmar Institute of Theology, Yangon, and Dip in Therapeutic formation from Philippines.

== Political career ==
He is a member of the National Unity Party. In the 2015 Myanmar general election, he was elected as an Amyotha Hluttaw MP, winning a majority of 13526 votes and elected representative from Kachin State No. 1 parliamentary constituency.
