= Lisu (Unicode block) =

- Range: U+A4D0..U+A4FF (48 code points)
- Plane: BMP
- Scripts: Lisu
- Major alphabets: Fraser Lisu
- Assigned: 48 code points
- Unused: 0 reserved code points

Unicode Version History
- 5.2 (2009): 48 (+48)

Unicode documentation
- Code chart ∣ Web page

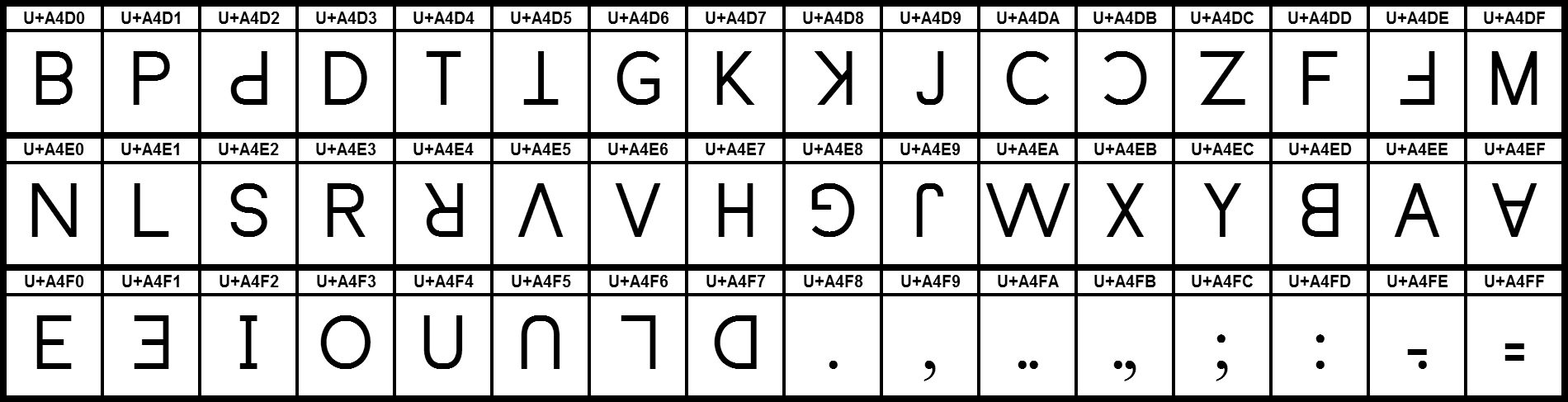
Graphical representation of the Lisu Unicode block

Lisu is a Unicode block containing characters of the Fraser alphabet, which is used to write the Lisu language. This alphabet (and by extension the block) consists of glyphs resembling capital letters in the basic Latin alphabet in their standard form and turned.

The addition of the block was subject to significant debate as to whether allocating a new block was necessary for the alphabet or if the turned letters not already in Unicode could instead be added to an existing block for the Latin script. However, since the Lisu letters only visually resemble their Latin counterparts and are semantically different, the former approach was ultimately taken.

This block is supported by a few fonts including Noto Sans Lisu, Lisu Unicode, DejaVu Sans (since v2.34), Quivira (since v3.2), and Segoe UI (since Windows 8).

In Unicode 13.0, a new block was also assigned for a single supplementary Lisu character used for the Naxi language, Lisu Supplement.

Lisu^{[1]} Official Unicode Consortium code chart (PDF)
	0	1	2	3	4	5	6	7	8	9	A	B	C	D	E	F
U+A4Dx	ꓐ	ꓑ	ꓒ	ꓓ	ꓔ	ꓕ	ꓖ	ꓗ	ꓘ	ꓙ	ꓚ	ꓛ	ꓜ	ꓝ	ꓞ	ꓟ
U+A4Ex	ꓠ	ꓡ	ꓢ	ꓣ	ꓤ	ꓥ	ꓦ	ꓧ	ꓨ	ꓩ	ꓪ	ꓫ	ꓬ	ꓭ	ꓮ	ꓯ
U+A4Fx	ꓰ	ꓱ	ꓲ	ꓳ	ꓴ	ꓵ	ꓶ	ꓷ	ꓸ	ꓹ	ꓺ	ꓻ	ꓼ	ꓽ	꓾	꓿
Notes 1.As of Unicode version 17.0

== History ==
The following Unicode-related documents record the purpose and process of defining specific characters in the Lisu block:

Version	Final code points (Note: Proposed code points and characters names may differ from final code points and names)	Count	L2 ID	WG2 ID	Document
5.2	U+A4D0..A4FF	48		N3353 (pdf, doc)	Umamaheswaran, V. S. (2007-10-10), "M51.30", Unconfirmed minutes of WG 2 meeting 51 Hanzhou, China; 2007-04-24/27
5.2	U+A4D0..A4FF	48	L2/07-297	N3323	Everson, Michael (2007-09-11), Towards an encoding of the Fraser script in the UCS
5.2	U+A4D0..A4FF	48	L2/07-294	N3326	Cook, Richard (2007-09-15), Fraser's Lisu orthography
5.2	U+A4D0..A4FF	48	L2/07-357	N3317R2	Proposal for encoding the Old Lisu script in the BMP of the UCS, 2007-10-10
5.2	U+A4D0..A4FF	48	L2/07-423		Documentation on legacy encodings of the Old Lisu script, 2007-12-29
5.2	U+A4D0..A4FF	48	L2/08-019	N3424	Cheuk, Adrian (2008-01-28), Proposal for encoding the Old Lisu script in the BMP of the UCS
5.2	U+A4D0..A4FF	48	L2/08-003		Moore, Lisa (2008-02-14), "Lisu", UTC #114 Minutes
5.2	U+A4D0..A4FF	48	L2/08-318	N3453 (pdf, doc)	Umamaheswaran, V. S. (2008-08-13), "M52.10", Unconfirmed minutes of WG 2 meeting 52
5.2	U+A4D0..A4FF	48	L2/09-247		Hosken, Martin (2009-07-10), Discussion and proposal of default Lisu sort order
