= James O. Fraser =

English Protestant Christian missionary to China (1886-1938)

James Outram Fraser (Chinese: 富能仁; 1886–1938) was an English Protestant Christian missionary to China with the China Inland Mission. He pioneered work among the Lisu people, of Southwestern China, in the early part of the 20th century. He is credited with developing the Fraser script for their language.

== Early life ==
Born in London in 1886. Fraser had four brothers and sisters. His parents divorced when Fraser was a teen, his mother moving to Letchworth, buying property with her own funds.

By 1906, he was at Imperial College London studying engineering. Fraser was accomplished in piano and held a recital in his twenties before he left for China.

== First years in Yunnan ==
He became a graduate engineer. However, in 1908 he dedicated his life to missionary work and joined the China Inland Mission. He arrived in China at 22 and travelled from Shanghai to Hong Kong and then to the mountainous region of China's far southwest.

He was forced by the chaos accompanying the 1911 Revolution to divide his time between Yunnan Province and Burma. He learned the Lisu language and commenced his work among the Lisu, a Tibeto-Burmese minority people who lived in the high mountains along the borders of the two countries.

Fraser had arrived in Yunnan in 1910 and spent nearly thirty years working among the Lisu. He lived among the Lisu and learned their language from the children there. He is best known for the alphabet he created for the Lisu, often referred to as the Fraser alphabet. It was designed for purpose of translating the New Testament into the Lisu language. Fraser also designed a written musical notation for transcribing the Lisu's oral history songs.

Going to China with CIM (China Inland Mission), he was stationed in the then remote province of Yunnan to work with the local Chinese, but Fraser was a keen climber and revelled in climbing through the mountains meeting and preaching to the Lisu people, particularly in the upper Salween River valley. Readily accepted by them and able to live in their mud floor huts, he was able to communicate a little through Chinese and then to learn their language, which is in the Tibeto-Burman group. Initial success was followed by years of doubt and difficulty until 1916, when he and fellow missionaries started to see scores of families convert to Christianity and enthusiastically pursue a new life without the fear of the spirits that had previously characterised them.

By 1918, sparked by family evangelism carried on by the people themselves, 600 believers had been baptised. Fraser was known for his ability to organise the people into strong indigenous churches that became models for church-planting ventures not only for other minority peoples in China's southwest but also for other Chinese.

Aware that they would soon need material in their language, he began work immediately on Mark's gospel and a hymnbook since they showed great interest in writing and were already great singers and natural musicians.

== Furlough and marriage ==
Fraser went back to England on furlough in 1924 and when he returned to "Lisuland" in 1929, he was married, to Roxie Dymond. She was the daughter of a Methodist missionary stationed in Kunming.

The Frasers were joined by missionaries Isobel and John Kuhn.

== Revival and the Fraser alphabet ==
Fraser developed a script for the Lisu language and used it to prepare a catechism, portions of Scripture and eventually, with much help from his colleagues, a complete New Testament. Working initially on Mark and John and then on a handbook of Lisu history and language, Fraser handed on the translation task to Allyn Cooke and his wife, Leila. He came back to help the team with revision and checking in the mid-1930s. The complete New Testament was finished in 1936.

Fraser maintained a consistent policy of training the Lisu converts (usually whole households and whole villages at a time) to be self-supporting and to pay for their own books and church buildings. They raised their own funds for the support of pastors, of wives and children of their travelling evangelists and of festivals and other occasions. Unlike other missionaries of his generation, Fraser would not pay local preachers to go out or for building local church structures. That was something that put the Lisu in good stead for the years of Japanese occupation and the Communist persecution, particularly during the Cultural Revolution.

Nevertheless, tens of thousands of them fled during this era to neighbouring Burma and Thailand. Fraser also left church government in the hands of Lisu elders; very little imprint was made on them that had a home church character, other than the tremendous prayer support the Frasers organised back in England for the Lisu and his work.

Throughout the 1930s, other missionaries came to assist in the work, but the bulk of the conversions happened as a result of Lisu evangelists covering the ground and reaching not only the Lisu but also the Kachin and Yi people (Nosu). Revivals also broke out at this time. It is acknowledged by the Chinese government that by the 1990s, over 90% of the Lisu in China were Christian.

== Final years and legacy ==
Fraser wrote many articles in English for "The Chinese Recorder" and "China's Millions". After seeing great fruit for his labours, James Outram Fraser died in Baoshan, in Western Yunnan in 1938 of cerebral malaria, leaving his pregnant wife and two children. He was 52.

Fraser's grave is now at the Qing Hua church.

"On September 25, 1938, while in Baoshan, Yunnan, China, James Fraser died at the age of 52. Due to land erosion, West Yunnan's Christian church decided to move the grave from the mountain slopes of Baoshan to this location, renewing the headstone on behalf of the Lisu church as a way of expressing their cherished memory of J.O. Fraser. Fraser's life has reaped a large harvest although many tears had first to be sown through his labours.

"The Lisu church at Baoshan plans to commemorate J.O. Fraser every seven years at a special Easter service in the new Bible training center they have started there. Another memorial to J.O. Fraser has been erected by Lisu believers in Weixi County in far northwestern Yunnan. Inscribed in Lisu, Chinese and English the English reads: “IN LOVING MEMORY. JAMES O. FRASER 1886–1938. How beautiful are the feet of those who bring good news. WITH DEEPEST LOVE REMEMBER YOU ALWAYS—THE LISU CHURCH.” The Chinese states additionally: “Erected by the Christian Church in the Lisu Autonomous County of Weixi on 15 March 2004.”

"The Lisu church has seen spectacular numerical growth in recent decades. In 1950 the Nujiang Lisu Autonomous Prefecture had 14,800 believers. By 1995 that number had risen to over 100,000—most of them Lisu. In the early 1980s the Yunnan Christian Council printed several thousand copies of the Lisu Bible. Then in 1995 a further 45,000 Lisu Bibles were published, as well as 65,000 Lisu hymnbooks. Both printings were in the special script devised by J.O. Fraser. However, the church is still hampered by endemic poverty, illiteracy and lack of trained pastors and evangelists. The rapid development of Yunnan as a tourist region and the tidal wave of emigration of young tribal people from the remote mountain valleys to the cities in search of work are bringing many changes to the Lisu church, not all of them positive.

In 1992, the Chinese government officially recognised the Fraser alphabet as the official script of the Lisu language. Today, Fraser is remembered as one of Christianity's most successful missionaries to East Asia in modern times.

Christianity is thriving in the Salween River valley, where the Lisu live nearly 70 years after the death of Fraser. Of the 18,000 Lisu who lived in Fugong in 1950, 3,400 professed faith in Christ. As of 2007, there are estimated to be 80–90 percent of the 70,000 making the same profession. In Yunnan it is estimated that there are 100,000–200,000 total Lisu Christians in the Lisu Church. More than 75,000 Lisu Bibles have been legally printed in China following the explosive growth.

His main biographer was Mrs. Howard Taylor, who published "Behind The Ranges" in 1944, containing numerous extracts from his letters and diaries. His daughter, Eileen Crossman, gives his biography, "Mountain Rain", in 1982, much of her material being drawn from Taylor (1944).
