= Li Su =

Li Su may refer to:

- Li Su (Han dynasty) (died 192), military officer under the warlords Dong Zhuo and Lü Bu
- Li Su (Tang dynasty) (773–821), general of the Tang dynasty
- Su Li (born 1985), Chinese sport shooter

== See also ==
- Lisu (disambiguation)
