= Lisu Supplement =

- Range: U+11FB0..U+11FBF (16 code points)
- Plane: SMP
- Scripts: Lisu
- Major alphabets: Fraser Lisu
- Assigned: 1 code points
- Unused: 15 reserved code points

Unicode Version History
- 13.0 (2020): 1 (+1)

Unicode documentation
- Code chart ∣ Web page

Lisu Supplement is a Unicode block containing supplementary characters of the Fraser alphabet, which is used to write the Lisu language. This is a supplement to the main Lisu block, with currently only a single character used for the Naxi language assigned to it.

== Block ==
Lisu Supplement^{[1]}^{[2]} Official Unicode Consortium code chart (PDF)
| | 0 | 1 | 2 | 3 | 4 | 5 | 6 | 7 | 8 | 9 | A | B | C | D | E | F |
| U+11FBx | 𑾰 | | | | | | | | | | | | | | | |
Notes 1.As of Unicode version 17.0 2.Grey areas indicate non-assigned code points

== History ==
The following Unicode-related documents record the purpose and process of defining specific characters in the Lisu Supplement block:

| Version | Final code points (Note: Proposed code points and characters names may differ from final code points and names) | Count | L2 ID | WG2 ID | Document |
|---|---|---|---|---|---|
| 13.0 | U+11FB0 | 1 | L2/18-338R | N5025 | Evans, Lorna; Rees, Neil (2019-01-08), Proposal to encode LISU LETTER YHA in the UCS |
| 13.0 | U+11FB0 | 1 | L2/18-338R2 | | Evans, Lorna; Rees, Neil (2019-01-16), Proposal to encode LISU LETTER YHA in the UCS |
| 13.0 | U+11FB0 | 1 | L2/19-047 | | Anderson, Deborah; et al. (2019-01-13), "17", Recommendations to UTC #158 January 2019 on Script Proposals |
| 13.0 | U+11FB0 | 1 | L2/19-008 | | Moore, Lisa (2019-02-08), "D.2", UTC #158 Minutes |
