= Rotated letter =

Printsetting and typographical technique

Note the leading J of Jacquard in a Caslon swash typeface, which was turned for the pound sign £.

In the days of printing with metal type sorts, it was common to rotate letters and digits 180° to create new symbols. This was a cheap way to extend the alphabet that didn't require purchasing or cutting custom sorts. The method was used for example with the Palaeotype alphabet, the International Phonetic Alphabet, the Fraser script, and for some mathematical symbols. Perhaps the earliest instance of this that is still in use is turned e for schwa.

In the eighteenth-century Caslon metal fonts, the British pound sign (£) was set with a rotated swash uppercase J.

== Unicode support ==
The following rotated (turned) letters have Unicode codepoints unless otherwise indicated.

=== Latin ===
In this table, parentheses mark letters that stand in for themselves or for another. For instance, a rotated 'b' would be a 'q', and indeed some physical typefaces didn't bother with distinct sorts for lowercase b and q, d and p, or n and u; while a rotated 's' or 'z' would be itself. Long s with a combining dot below, ⟨ſ̣⟩, can stand in for a rotated j.

(En dashes are used to mark small caps that would not be very distinct from the turned lower case letter, though they are possible: turned small cap c is supported, for example: ⟨ᴐ⟩).

The Fraser script creates a number of duplicates of the rotated capitals.

Rotated basic Latin letters
	A	B	C	D	E	F	G	H	I	J	K	L	M	N	O	P	Q	R	S	T	U	V	W	X	Y	Z
Rotated minuscule	ɐ·ɒ	(q)	ɔ	(p)	ə·ǝ	ɟ	ᵷ·ɓ	ɥ	ᴉ	(ſ̣)	ʞ	ꞁ	ɯ	(u)	(o)	(d)	(b)	ɹ	(s)	ʇ	(n)	ʌ	ʍ	(x)	ʎ	(z)
Rotated small cap	ꮜ		ᴐ		ⱻ	ⅎ	𝼂	(ʜ)	(ɪ)	ɾ	𝼐		ꟺ (Note: ⟨ꟺ⟩ displays a number of ways in different typefaces, but officially it is a turned small capital M.)	(ɴ)	(ᴏ)			ᴚ	(ꜱ)			–	–	–		(ᴢ)
Rotated capital	Ɐ	ᙠ	Ɔ·Ↄ	ᗡ	Ǝ	Ⅎ	⅁*	(H)	(I)	Ր	Ʞ	Ꞁ	ꟽ (Note: ⟨ꟽ⟩ is an M rotated 90° or 180° and is called "epigraphic inverted M" in Unicode.)	(N)	(O)	Ԁ*		Ꞟ	(S)	Ʇ	Ո	Ʌ		(X)	Ꟛ·⅄*	(Z)
Fraser script	ꓯ	ꓭ	ꓛ	ꓷ	ꓱ	ꓞ	ꓨ			ꓩ	ꓘ	ꓶ				ꓒ		ꓤ		ꓕ	ꓵ	ꓥ			𑾰	

*The Unicode mathematical symbol ⅁ is specified as sans-serif, as are ⅂ and ⅄. Cyrillic Ԁ might be used as a rotated capital 'P'.

Other rotated letters include the digraphs ᴂ and ᴔ. The "rotated" capital Q in Unicode is only turned 90 degrees: ℺.

Additional small cap forms are found in the literature (e.g. turned ᴀ ʟ ᴜ), but are not supported as of Unicode 17.

=== Greek and Cyrillic ===
Many of the few rotated Greek letters are intended for mathematical notation. In this table, an en dash is used to mark Greek and Cyrillic letters that are not rotationally symmetrical nor do they have a representative codepoint in Unicode representing its rotation, though glyphs resembling such characters can be found by looking up the corresponding Latin homoglyph. Reversed L, ⟨⅃⟩, can stand in for a rotated gamma Γ, though Unicode defines it as sans serif; likewise with ⅄ for Υ. The symbols of ∀ and ∃ are semantically mathematical symbols.

Rotated Greek letters
	Α	Β	Γ	Δ	Ε	Ζ	Η	Θ	Ι	Κ	Λ	Μ	Ν	Ξ	Ο	Π	Ρ	Σ	Τ	Υ	Φ	Χ	Ψ	Ω
Rotated minuscule	ɒ			ƍ	ᴈ·϶		ⴑ	(θ)	℩				ʌ		–					(ი)		(χ)		*
Rotated capital	(∀)	𐤡	(⅃)	∇	(∃)	(Ζ)	(Η)	(Θ)	(Ι)	Ʞ	V	ꟽ	(Ν)	(Ξ)	(Ο)	ⵡ	Ԁ	*	Ʇ	(⅄)	(Φ)	(Χ)		℧

Rotated Cyrillic letters
	А	Б	В	Г	Д	Е	Ж	З	И	Й	К	Л	М	Н	О	П	Р	С	Т	У	Ф	Х	Ц	Ч	Ш	Щ	Ъ	Ы	Ь	Э	Ю	Я
Rotated minuscule	ɐ	*		(ƨ)	(ᵷ)	ә	(ж)	ԑ	(и)	и̯		(v)		(н)	(о)	(u)	ԁ	ↄ	(ɯ)	ʎ	(ф)	(х)			ᲅ					є	ꙕ	ʁ (Note: ⟨ʁ⟩ is graphically equivalent to rotated Cyrillic я, though Unicode defines the character as an inverted Latin ʀ)
Rotated capital	(∀)		𐤡	(⅃)	(∇)	(∃)	(Ж)	Ԑ	(И)	И̯	Ʞ	(V)	ꟽ	(Н)	(О)	ⵡ	Ԁ	Ↄ	Ʇ	–	(Ф)	(Х)		Һ	𐊿			(Іꟼ)	(ꟼ)	Є	Ꙕ	

⟨ƍ⟩ is close to the turned form of one variant of lower-case Б.

In some fonts, an allograph of Ʒ displays as turned Σ.

An example of a font that uses turned small-capital Ω for the vowel letter ⟨ʊ⟩.

In addition, the turned Latin alpha ɒ and horseshoe ʊ of the IPA have allographs that are a turned Greek alpha and turned small-capital Ω.

=== Other ===
Other rotated symbols include ɞ (rotated or reversed ʚ), ʖ (rotated ʕ) ⱹ (rotated ɽ), ɺ (rotated ɼ), the digits ↊ and ↋, the insular g: Ꝿ ꝿ, and the ampersand ⅋.

The turned comma or inverted comma (‘) is, as its name suggests, a rotated comma. This symbol is most commonly encountered as an opening single quotation mark. It is also used for the Hawaiian letter ‘okina. In some older British texts, it was used as a superscript ⟨c⟩ to abbreviate for the Scottish name element Mac/Mc, also written as M^{ac}/M^{c}, thus yielding M‘, as in M‘Culloch.

Spanish uses the rotated punctuation marks ¡ (inverted exclamation mark) and ¿ (inverted question mark).

=== Reversed letters ===
In addition to turned letters, Unicode supports a few reversed (mirror-image) letters such as ɘ, Ƨ ƨ, Ƹ ƹ, ʕ, ᴎ, ᴙ, ꟻ, ⅃ and ꟼ; Cyrillic Ꙡ ꙡ (as well as Cyrillic И и and Я я, which are graphically equivalent to reversed Latin N ɴ and R ʀ and are often used as such for novel effect), superscript ᶟ ᴻ, and the tresillo Ꜫ ꜫ, which historically is a reversed three. Current IPA ɜ is officially a reversed rather than rotated ɛ; the older rotated ᴈ is now deprecated. Ƌ is close to a reversed Cyrillic Б. Reversed k ɡ ŋ (𝼃 𝼁 𝼇) were added to the extIPA in 2015.
