= Arthur Mathews (missionary) =

Robert Arthur Mathews (4 February 1912 – 29 July 1978) was a Protestant Christian missionary who served with the China Inland Mission (CIM). In 1953, he and his fellow CIM missionary, Dr. Rupert Clark, were the last foreign missionaries to leave China following the Chinese Communist Party's victory in the Chinese Civil War.

== Early life ==
Mathews was born in China on February 4, 1912. He was the son of Australian CIM missionaries Robert Henry Mathews and Annie Ethel Smith. Mathews spent his early childhood in China, later working as a farmhand in Australia. His mother died in the field, and he was initially not accepted by CIM for this reason. However, in 1936 he began attending Melbourne Bible Institute in preparation for mission work, and arrived in China in 1938.

From 1943 to 1946, he was a major with the 12th Frontier Force Regiment in the British Indian Army during World War II. The regimental center was in the Punjab town of Sialkot (now Pakistan). He was influenced by the leaders of the Punjab Prayer Union and the prayers of Praying Hyde, as a revival had broken out there at the turn of the century.

Mathews married Wilda Anita Miller (born October 29, 1909) of Compton, Los Angeles, California, a graduate of Biola University. Their daughter Lilah was named after Wilda's younger sister. After 12 years in China, the China Inland Mission assigned the Mathews "to teach Christianity" to the Mongolian people. He studied Mongolian for a year at Lanzhou.

== Missionary work in China ==
The year before they returned, in 1949, the Chinese Civil War ended and the People's Republic of China came into power. The Chinese church had invited them to come, with the approval of the Communist government. In an article from February 1, 1951, entitled "China's Millions", Mathews wrote that "All the Mongols from the areas to the north and west of Kokonor were expansion routes for the Gospel."

On their arrival, the Chinese Christian pastors were worried about the political situation, and informed the couple that they would not be allowed to evangelize during their stay in Huangyuan. As time went on, they were prohibited from visiting homes and preaching within the city, and were eventually confined to the missionary complex and barred from distributing medicine.

In response, Arthur Mathews decided to start a Mongol Gospel Inn for traveling Mongolians. The building was rented, renovated with new floor boards, and decorated with Gospel posters in Tibetan, Mongolian, and Chinese. However, shortly before the opening, Chinese troops moved in and took over the building. Following Mathews' protests, a police officer arrived at the mission two days later to inform them that they were prohibited from conducting any further missionary activities.

The China Inland Mission organization advised all their missionaries, numbering 601 adults and 284 children, to evacuate China, and the Mathews family duly applied for exit visas on January 3, 1951. However, these were denied, meaning that while hundreds of other missionaries were able to leave for the China Inland Mission's headquarters in Singapore, the Mathews and their daughter remained behind in the north with a small number of others, where they were the subject of poor treatment from the authorities.

Mathews was summoned to the police station and asked to sign a statement that he was for world peace, which he did. The government official then suggested that he could go to India to work as a Communist spy, but he refused. Another government official subsequently offered the Mathews family exit visas in return for a report on five other missionaries. When he refused, fearing that his text would be altered without his consent, the official informed him that a charge had been laid against him for investigation, which could last a long time.

As a result, the Mathews family was forced to remain in China for a further two and a half years. Their provisions from their mission were frozen by the government, who made Mathews submit reports of what he would need, which were then underfulfilled. Their daughter Lilah contracted scarlet fever and nearly died. Eventually the family were forbidden from speaking to anyone, and only allowed to leave home to draw water from the creek and get food.

Eventually, Mathews was imprisoned and brought to trial. As punishment on his conviction, Mathews and his colleague Rupert Clarke were "eternally and everlastingly" expelled from China, the last two missionaries to leave the country. Their wives, Wilda Mathews and Jeanette Clarke, had been allowed to leave with other missionaries before. Following Mathews's release from prison in China in July 1953, he sailed on August 11 for Vancouver, British Columbia, and was reunited with Wilda and Lilah.

== After release from China ==
After they were reunited in British Columbia, the family moved to Chicago, where Arthur and Wilda ran the CIM mission home. Many students of the Moody Bible Institute attended their prayer meetings. Arthur became the Overseas Missionary Fellowship/CIM United States Midwest Director from 1955 to 1964. The Mathews served at the headquarters from 1964 to 1970 as Candidate Secretary and from 1971 to 1974 as Public Relations Secretary. Arthur also served on the board of Colombia Bible College from 1964 to 1973. From 1969 to 1977 he was editor of the mission magazine, East Asia Millions.

While Arthur was terminally ill with amyotrophic lateral sclerosis, he wrote a book entitled Born for Battle, a collection of articles written originally as editorials in East Asia Millions, the Overseas Missionary Fellowship's magazine. The book was released shortly after his death on July 29, 1978, at the age of 66. Born for Battle was inscribed on his tombstone. His wife Wilda died on September 13, 1988. Both are buried with many other Overseas Missionary Fellowship missionaries and staff at the Mellinger Mennonite Cemetery in Lancaster, Pennsylvania.
