= Fraser script =

Alphabetic writing system

Fraser
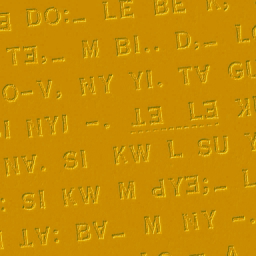
- Script type: Abugida
- Creator: James O. Fraser
- Period: c. 1915–present
- Direction: Left-to-right
- Languages: Lisu, Naxi, Zaiwa

Related scripts
- Parent systems: Phoenician script: Greek script; Latin script; Fraser

ISO 15924
- ISO 15924: Lisu (399), Lisu (Fraser)

Unicode
- Unicode alias: Lisu
- Unicode range: U+A4D0–U+A4FF, U+11FB0–U+11FBF

The Fraser or Old Lisu script is an artificial abugida for the Lisu language invented around 1915 by Sara Ba Thaw, a Karen preacher from Myanmar, and improved by the missionary James O. Fraser. It is a single-case (unicameral) alphabet. It was also used for the Naxi language, e.g. in the 1932 Naxi Gospel of Mark, and used in the Zaiwa or Atsi language, e.g. in the 1938 Atsi Gospel of Mark.

The script uses uppercase letters from the Latin script (except for the letter Q) and rotated versions thereof (except for the letters M, Q and W) to write consonants and vowels. Tones and nasalization are written with Roman punctuation marks, identical to those found on a typewriter. Like the Indic abugidas, the vowel [a] is not written. However, unlike those scripts, the other vowels are written with full letters.

The local Chinese government in Nujiang de facto recognized the script in 1992 as the official script for writing in Lisu, although other Lisu autonomous territories continue to use the New Lisu (Latin script) for official matters.

== Consonants ==
Note: You may need to download a Lisu-capable Unicode font if not all characters display.

Fraser consonants
		Labial	Alveolar	Alveolar sibilant	Post- alveolar	Velar	Glottal
Plosive	Tenuis	ꓑ [p]	ꓔ [t]	ꓝ [ts]	ꓚ [tʃ]	ꓗ [k]	ꓮ [ʔ]^{1}
Plosive	Aspirate	ꓒ [pʰ]	ꓕ [tʰ]	ꓞ [tsʰ]	ꓛ [tʃʰ]	ꓘ [kʰ]	
Plosive	Voiced	ꓐ [b]	ꓓ [d]	ꓜ [dz]	ꓙ [dʒ]	ꓖ [ɡ]	ꓨ [ɦ]^{3} ^{4}
Fricative	Voiceless	ꓩ [f]^{4}		ꓢ [s]	ꓫ [ʃ]	ꓧ [x]	
Fricative	Voiced			ꓤ [z]^{4}	ꓣ [ʒ]	ꓭ [ɯ]?, [ɣ]^{2}	
Nasal		ꓟ [m]	ꓠ [n]		ꓠꓬ [ɲ]	ꓥ [ŋ]	ꓦ [h̃]^{3}
Approximant	Voiced	ꓪ [w], [u̯]^{2}	ꓡ [l]		ꓬ [ʝ], [i̯]^{2}		
Approximant	Voiced Aspirate				𑾰 [ʝʰ], [i̯ʰ]^{2} ^{5}		

1. Initial glottal stop is only written when the inherent vowel [ɑ] follows, and just like all consonants, the inherent vowel suffix ˍ must not be written as that would indicate another [ɑ] follows (ʔɑɑ instead of ʔɑ). It is automatic before all initial vowels but [ɯ] and [ə].
2. ꓭ represents a "vowel" in the Naxi language, presumably [ɯ], and a consonant [ɣ] in the Lisu language. ꓪ, ꓬ and 𑾰 are likewise ambiguous.
3. ꓨ only occurs in an imperative particle. It is an allophone of ꓦ [h̃], which causes nasalization to the syllable.
4. ꓤ, ꓨ and ꓩ are used only in Lisu language.
5. 𑾰 is used only in Naxi language.

== Vowels ==
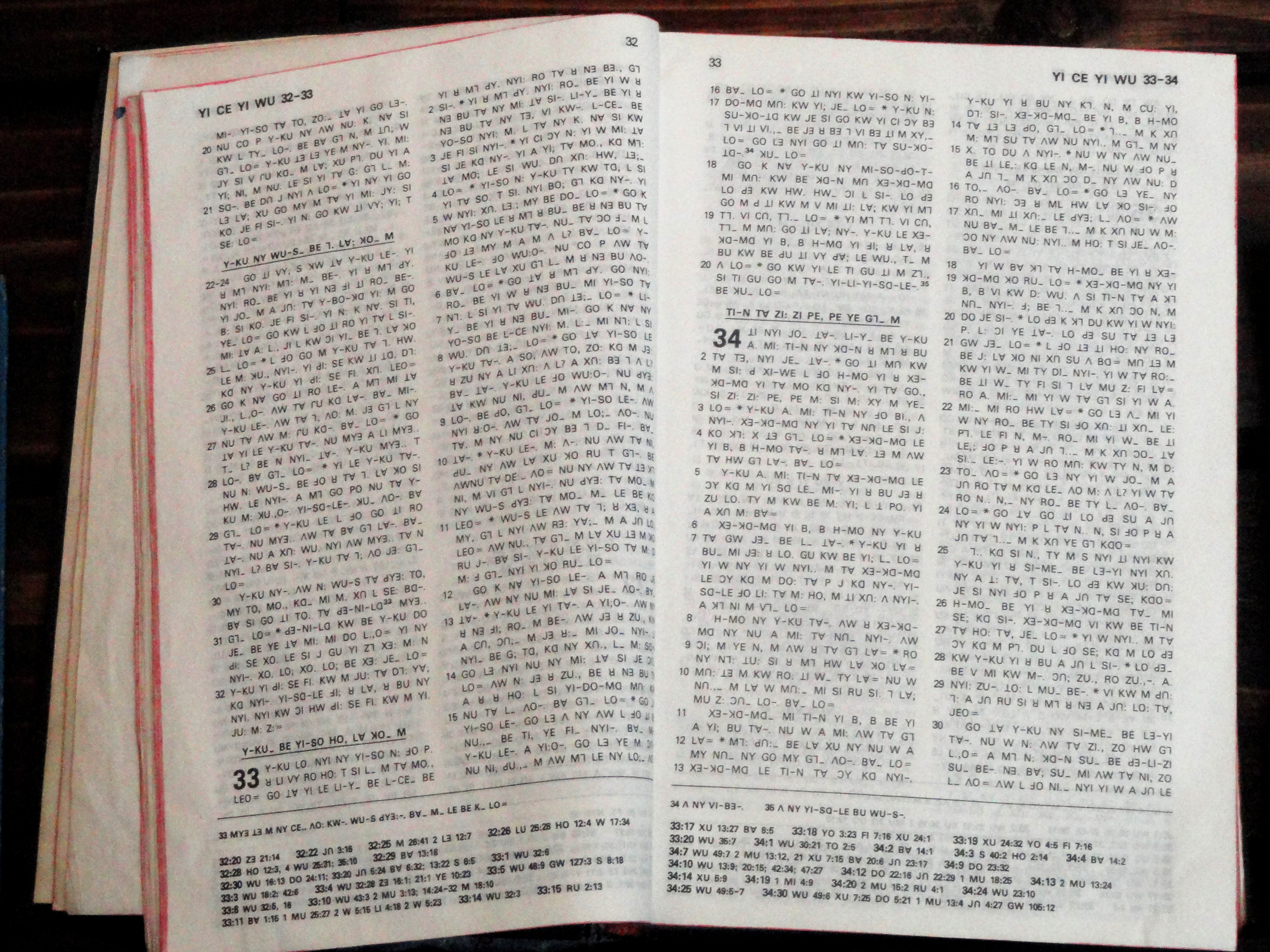
Lisu language Bible in the Fraser script

Fraser vowels
	Front			Central/back		
High	ꓲ [i]	ꓵ [y]		ꓶ [ɯ]	ꓴ [u]	
Mid	ꓰ [e]	ꓱ [ø]	ꓬꓱ [i̯ø]	ꓷ [ə]	ꓳ [ʊ]	ꓮꓳ [ɑw]/[ɔ]
Low	ꓯ [ɛ]			ˍ** [ɑ]	ꓪ [wɑ]	ꓬ [i̯ɑ]

**Only written after a syllable (consonant letter) to indicate a second vowel. Other vowels do not have special letters to emphasize a secondary vowel without glottal stop initial, such as ꓡꓷꓰꓹ ([ləe]) is not written as ꓡꓷˍꓰꓹ and can only be distinguished from ꓡꓷ ꓰꓹ ([lə ʔe]) by a space.

For example, ⟨ꓗ⟩ is [kɑ̄], while ⟨ꓗꓲ⟩ is [kī].

When consonant ꓠꓬ, ꓬ is used with vowel ꓬꓱ, ꓬ, without being ambiguous only one ꓬ is written.

When transcribing diphthongs and nasal codas, letters ꓮ and ꓬ can work like vowels just like English letter Y, making Fraser script behave like an abjadic alphabet like the Roman instead of an abugida like Tibetan; meanwhile space works like a delimiter like a Tibetan tseg, making a final consonant (such as ꓠ) possible without necessity of a halanta sign: 凉粉 ꓡꓬꓮꓳ ꓩꓷꓠ reads as /li̯ɛw fən/ rather than as ꓡꓬ ꓮ ꓳ ꓩꓷ ꓠ /li̯ɑ ʔɑ ʔʊ fə nɑ/.

== Tones ==
Tones are written with standard punctuation. Lisu punctuation therefore differs from international norms: the comma is ⟨꓾⟩ (hyphen period) and the full stop is ⟨꓿⟩ (equal sign).

Diacritics on the syllable ꓝ [tsɑ]
ꓝ [tsɑ̄]	ꓝꓸ [tsɑ́]	ꓝꓹ [tsɑ̌]
ꓝꓻ [tsɑ̄ˀ]*	ꓝꓺ [tsɑ̄ˀ]	ꓝʼ [tsɑ̄̃]
ꓝꓼ [tsàˀ]	ꓝꓽ [tsà]	ꓝˍ [tsɑ̄à]

*It is not clear how the ⟨ꓻ⟩ mid tone differs from the unmarked mid tone.

The tones ⟨ꓸ⟩, ⟨ꓹ⟩, ⟨ꓺ⟩, ⟨ꓻ⟩ may be combined with ⟨ꓼ⟩ and ⟨ꓽ⟩ as compound tones. However, the only compound tone still in common use is ⟨ꓹꓼ⟩.

The apostrophe indicates nasalization. It is combined with tone marks.

The low macron indicates the Lisu "A glide", a contraction of [à] without an intervening glottal stop. The tone is not always falling, depending on the environment, but is written ⟨ˍ⟩ regardless.

== Letter forms ==
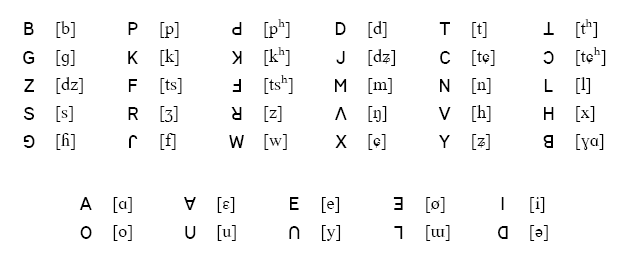
Lisu alphabet

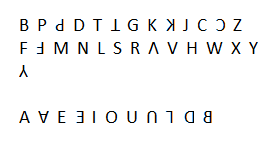
Naxi alphabet

Although Fraser published a serif form of the script, almost all typesetting today is done in a sans-serif typeface.

== Unicode ==
The Fraser script was added to the Unicode Standard in October, 2009 with the release of version 5.2.

The Unicode block for the Fraser script, called 'Lisu', is U+A4D0–U+A4FF:

Lisu^{[1]} Official Unicode Consortium code chart (PDF)
	0	1	2	3	4	5	6	7	8	9	A	B	C	D	E	F
U+A4Dx	ꓐ	ꓑ	ꓒ	ꓓ	ꓔ	ꓕ	ꓖ	ꓗ	ꓘ	ꓙ	ꓚ	ꓛ	ꓜ	ꓝ	ꓞ	ꓟ
U+A4Ex	ꓠ	ꓡ	ꓢ	ꓣ	ꓤ	ꓥ	ꓦ	ꓧ	ꓨ	ꓩ	ꓪ	ꓫ	ꓬ	ꓭ	ꓮ	ꓯ
U+A4Fx	ꓰ	ꓱ	ꓲ	ꓳ	ꓴ	ꓵ	ꓶ	ꓷ	ꓸ	ꓹ	ꓺ	ꓻ	ꓼ	ꓽ	꓾	꓿
Notes 1.As of Unicode version 18.0

An additional character, the inverted Y used in the Naxi language, was added to the Unicode Standard in March, 2020 with the release of version 13.0. It is in the Lisu Supplement block (U+11FB0–U+11FBF):

Lisu Supplement^{[1]}^{[2]} Official Unicode Consortium code chart (PDF)
	0	1	2	3	4	5	6	7	8	9	A	B	C	D	E	F
U+11FBx	𑾰															
Notes 1.As of Unicode version 18.0 2.Grey areas indicate non-assigned code points

== See also ==
- OMF International
