= List of ethnic groups in China =

Overview of Chinese ethnicities

Ethnolinguistic map of China

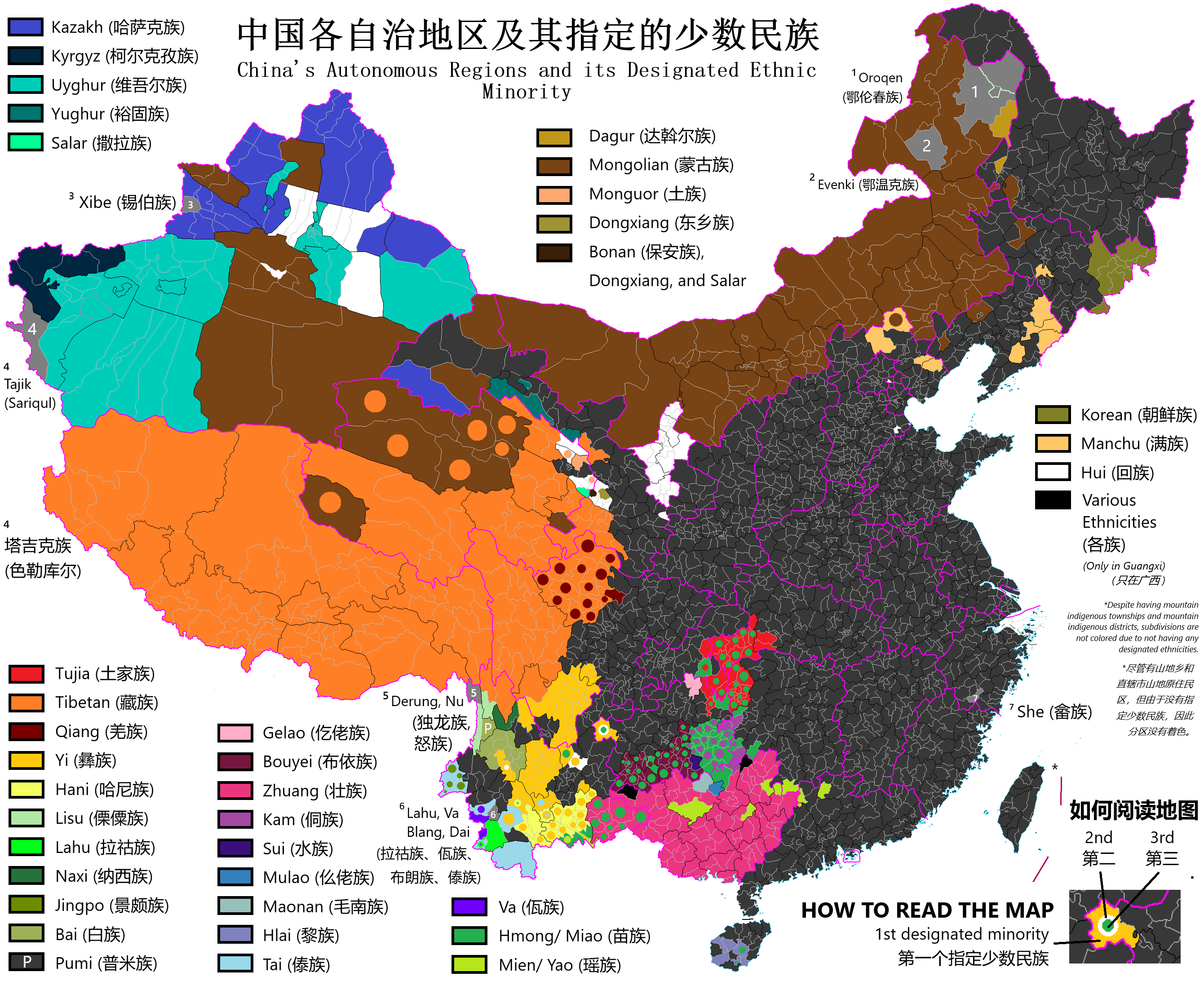
China's Autonomous Regions and its Designated Ethnic Minority

The Han Chinese are by far the largest ethnic group in Mainland China, comprising 91.5% of the country's population of around 1.2 billion in 2010. There are 55 other minority ethnic groups in present-day China, representing approximately 105 million people, or around 8% of China's population. They are mostly concentrated around border regions.

The main ethnic minorities in China are the Zhuang (19.6 million), Hui (11.4 million), Uyghurs (11 million), Miao (11 million), Manchus (10.4 million), Yi (9.8 million), Tujia (9.6 million), Tibetans (7 million), Mongols (6.3 million), Buyei (3.5 million), Dong (3.5 million), Yao (3.3 million), Bai (2 million), Koreans (1.7 million), Hani (1.7 million), Li (1.6 million), Kazakhs (1.5 million), and Dai (1.2 million). In addition, there are a number of unrecognized ethnic groups which together comprise over 730,000 people. Collectively, the ethnic groups of China are referred to as the Zhonghua minzu (Chinese: 中华民族; pinyin: Zhōnghuá mínzú; lit. 'Chinese ethnicity').

Hong Kong and Macau are special administrative regions within China, and as such, do not use the ethnic classification system used on the Mainland. Hong Kong and Macau are both majority Han Chinese with ethnic minorities of Western European (mainly English and Portuguese), Southeast Asian (mainly Filipinos, Indonesians, and Vietnamese), and South Asian (in the case of Hong Kong) origin.

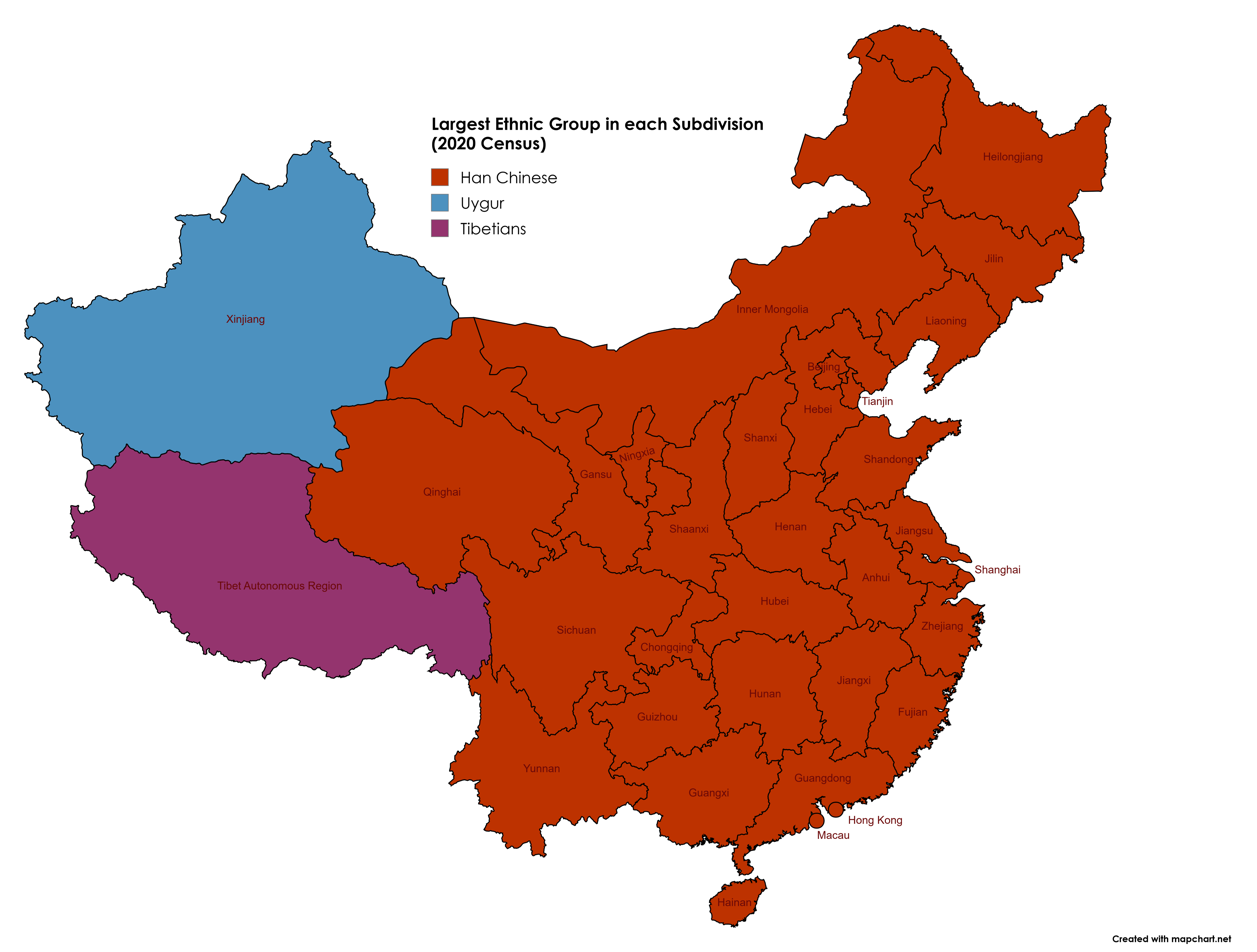
This map shows the largest ethnic groups in each Chinese subdivision from the 2020 census.

== Officially recognized groups ==
Officially recognized ethnic groups receive or have received certain benefits over Han Chinese under the regional ethnic autonomy system, including affirmative action, exemptions from the one-child policy, designated seats in political organs and government support to preserve their culture. Ethnic minority autonomous areas receive additional state subsidies. Languages of officially recognized minorities are used in official government documents.

Soon after the establishment of the People's Republic of China, 39 ethnic groups were recognized by the first national census in 1954. This further increased to 54 by the second national census in 1964, with the Lhoba people added in 1965. The last change was the addition of the Jino people in 1979, bringing the number of recognized ethnic groups to the current 56. The following are the 56 ethnic groups (listed by population) officially recognized by the People's Republic of China.

Standard Romanization	Code	Simplified Chinese	Hanyu Pinyin	2020 National Shares	2020 Population (Note: The population only includes mainland China.)	2010 Population	2000 Population	1990 Population	Year of recognition (Note: For ethnic groups officially recognised in 1964 or earlier, this is the year of first inclusion in the national census, which were in 1954 and 1964.)
Han	HA	汉族	Hànzú	91.1098%	1,284,446,389	1,220,844,520	1,139,773,008	1,042,482,187	1954
Zhuang	ZH	壮族	Zhuàngzú	1.3801%	19,568,546	16,926,381	16,187,163	15,489,630	1954
Uygur	UG	维吾尔族	Wéiwú'ěrzú	0.8352%	11,774,538	10,069,346	8,405,416	7,214,431	1954
Hui	HU	回族	Huízú	0.8070%	11,377,914	10,586,087	9,828,126	8,602,978	1954
Miao (Note: One subset of which is also known as Hmong and other include Hmu, Xong and A-Hmao. Some of the related languages and groups of peoples are not necessarily classified under the Miao umbrella, which makes this term somewhat vague.)	MH	苗族	Miáozú	0.7851%	11,067,929	9,426,007	8,945,538	7,398,035	1954
Man	MA	满族	Mǎnzú	0.7394%	10,423,303	10,387,958	10,708,464	9,821,180	1954
Yi	YI	彝族	Yízú	0.6973%	9,830,327	8,714,393	7,765,858	6,572,173	1954
Tujia	TJ	土家族	Tǔjiāzú	0.6801%	9,587,732	8,353,912	8,037,014	5,704,223	1964
Zang (Note: Including Amdowa and Khampa, as well as roughly half of Pumi speakers, the remainder of whom are classified as a separate Pumi ethnicity.) / Tibetan (Note: Used for external purposes (对外使用时))	ZA	藏族	Zàngzú	0.5008%	7,060,731	6,282,187	5,422,954	4,593,330	1954
Mongol	MG	蒙古族	Měnggǔzú	0.4461%	6,290,204	5,981,840	5,827,808	4,806,849	1954
Buyei	BY	布依族	Bùyīzú	0.2537%	3,576,752	2,870,034	2,973,217	2,545,059	1954
Dong (Note: Also known as Kam.)	DO	侗族	Dòngzú	0.2480%	3,495,993	2,879,974	2,962,911	2,514,014	1954
Yao	YA	瑶族	Yáozú	0.2347%	3,309,341	2,796,003	2,638,878	2,134,013	1954
Bai	BA	白族	Báizú	0.1484%	2,091,543	1,933,510	1,861,895	1,594,827	1954
Hani	HN	哈尼族	Hānízú	0.1229%	1,733,166	1,660,932	1,440,029	1,253,952	1954
Chosen / Korean (Note: Used for external purposes (对外使用时))	CS	朝鲜族	Cháoxiǎnzú	0.1207%	1,702,479	1,830,929	1,929,696	1,920,597	1954
Li	LI	黎族	Lízú	0.1136%	1,602,104	1,463,064	1,248,022	1,110,900	1954
Kazak	KZ	哈萨克族	Hāsàkèzú	0.1108%	1,562,518	1,462,588	1,248,022	1,110,900	1954
Dai (Note: This category includes several different Tai-speaking groups historically referred to as Bai-yi. In fact, the Dai nationality consists of speakers of varieties of Shan languages. For instance, the Tai Lue and Tai Nuea peoples are actually subgroups of the Shan people. Despite this, speakers of Bumang are also included in the Dai nationality.)	DA	傣族	Dǎizú	0.0943%	1,329,985	1,261,311	1,159,231	1,025,128	1954
Lisu	LS	傈僳族	Lìsùzú	0.0541%	762,296	702,839	635,101	574,856	1954
She	SH	畲族	Shēzú	0.0529%	746,385	708,651	710,039	630,378	1964
Dongxiang	DX	东乡族	Dōngxiāngzú	0.0550%	774,947	621,500	513,826	373,872	1954
Gelao	GL	仡佬族	Gēlǎozú	0.0481%	677,521	550,746	579,744	437,997	1964
Lahu	LH	拉祜族	Lāhùzú	0.0354%	499,167	485,966	453,765	411,476	1954
Sui	SU	水族	Shuǐzú	0.0352%	495,928	411,847	407,000	345,993	1954
Va	VA	佤族	Wǎzú	0.0306%	430,997	429,709	396,709	351,974	1954
Naxi	NX	纳西族	Nàxīzú	0.0230%	323,767	326,295	309,477	278,009	1954
Qiang	QI	羌族	Qiāngzú	0.0222%	312,981	309,576	306,476	198,252	1954
Tu	TU	土族	Tǔzú	0.0200%	281,928	289,565	241,593	191,624	1954
Mulao	ML	仫佬族	Mùlǎozú	0.0197%	277,233	216,257	207,464	159,328	1964
Kirgiz	KG	柯尔克孜族	Kē'ěrkèzīzú	0.0145%	204,402	186,708	160,875	141,549	1954
Xibe	XB	锡伯族	Xībózú	0.0136%	191,911	190,481	189,357	172,847	1954
Salar	SL	撒拉族	Sālāzú	0.0117%	165,159	130,607	104,521	87,697	1954
Jingpo (Note: Known as Kachin in Myanmar.)	JP	景颇族	Jǐngpōzú	0.0114%	160,471	147,828	132,158	119,209	1954
Daur	DU	达斡尔族	Dáwò'ěrzú	0.0094%	132,299	131,992	132,747	121,357	1964
Blang	BL	布朗族	Bùlǎngzú	0.0090%	127,345	119,639	91,891	82,280	1964
Maonan	MN	毛南族	Máonánzú	0.0088%	124,092	101,192	107,184	71,968	1964
Tajik (Note: They are not Tajik people but Pamiri people.)	TA	塔吉克族	Tǎjíkèzú	0.0036%	50,896	51,069	41,056	33,538	1954
Pumi	PM	普米族	Pǔmǐzú	0.0032%	45,012	42,861	33,628	29,657	1964
Achang	AC	阿昌族	Āchāngzú	0.0031%	43,775	39,555	33,954	27,708	1964
Nu	NU	怒族	Nùzú	0.0026%	36,575	37,523	28,770	27,123	1964
Ewenki	EW	鄂温克族	Èwēnkèzú	0.0025%	34,617	30,875	30,545	26,315	1954
Gin (Note: The same group as Kinh people in Vietnam)	GI	京族	Jīngzú	0.0024%	33,112	28,199	22,584	18,915	1964
Jino	JN	基诺族	Jīnuòzú	0.0018%	26,025	23,143	20,899	18,021	1979
Bonan	BN	保安族	Bǎo'ānzú	0.0017%	24,434	20,074	16,505	12,212	1954
Deang (Note: Known as Palaung in Myanmar.)	DE	德昂族	Dé'ángzú	0.0016%	22,354	20,556	17,935	15,462	1964
Russ	RS	俄罗斯族	Éluósīzú	0.0011%	16,136	15,393	15,631	13,504	1954
Yugur	YG	裕固族	Yùgùzú	0.0010%	14,706	14,378	13,747	12,297	1954
Uzbek	UZ	乌孜别克族	Wūzībiékèzú	0.0009%	12,742	10,569	12,423	14,502	1954
Monba	MB	门巴族	Ménbāzú	0.0008%	11,143	10,561	8,928	7,475	1964
Oroqen	OR	鄂伦春族	Èlúnchūnzú	0.0007%	9,168	8,659	8,216	6,965	1954
Derung	DR	独龙族	Dúlóngzú	0.0005%	7,310	6,930	7,431	5,816	1964
Hezhen (Note: The same group as Nanai people on the Russian side of the border.)	HZ	赫哲族	Hèzhézú	0.0004%	5,373	5,354	4,664	4,245	1964
Lhoba	LB	珞巴族	Luòbāzú	0.0003%	4,237	3,682	2,970	2,312	1965
Tatar	TT	塔塔尔族	Tǎtǎ'ěrzú	0.0003%	3,544	3,556	4,895	4,873	1954
Gaoshan (Note: A collective name for all Taiwanese aborigine groups in Taiwan. In fact, the numbers of Gaoshan in census covers only those who lives in mainland China (mainly in Fujian) and consists of Amis (autonym: Pangcah), Paiwan and Bunun peoples.)	GS	高山族	Gāoshānzú	0.0002%	3,479	4,009	4,488	2,909	1954
(Undistinguished)	none	未识别民族	Wèi Shìbié Mínzú	0.0593%	836,488	640,101	734,438	749,341	—
(Naturalized citizens)	none	外国人加入中国籍	Wàiguórén Jiārù Zhōngguójí	0.0012%	16,595	1,448	941	3,421	—

== Unlisted ethnic groups ==
The following ethnic groups living in China are not recognized by the Chinese government:

- Äynu people – classified as Uyghurs
- Altai people – classified as Mongols
- Bajia (八甲人; Bājiǎrén)
- Chuanqing people – classified as Han
- Deng people
- Fuyu Kyrgyz people – classified as Kyrgyz
- Gejia people – classified as Miao
- Hu people – classified as Bulang
- Ili Turk people – classified as Uzbek
- Jewish people – classified as Han
- Khmu people – classified as Bulang
- Kucong
- Macanese people, mixed race Catholic Portuguese speakers who lived in Macau since 16th century of various ethnic origins
- Mảng people
- Mosuo – classified as Naxi
- Qago people (木佬人) – classified as Mulao
- Sangkong people – classified as Hani
- Sherpa people – classified as Tibetan
- Tanka people, including Fuzhou Tanka – classified as Han
- Tebbu people
- Then people – classified as Maonan
- Tuvans – classified as Mongols
- Utsuls – classified as Hui
- Waxiang people
- Yamato people and Ryukyuan people, primarily Japanese settlers that remained in China after the Second Sino-Japanese War, which mostly were women and orphaned children

During the Fifth National Population Census of the People's Republic of China held in 2000, 734,438 people on the mainland were recorded as belonging to "undistinguished ethnic groups"—of these, 97% resided in Guizhou.

== Gallery ==
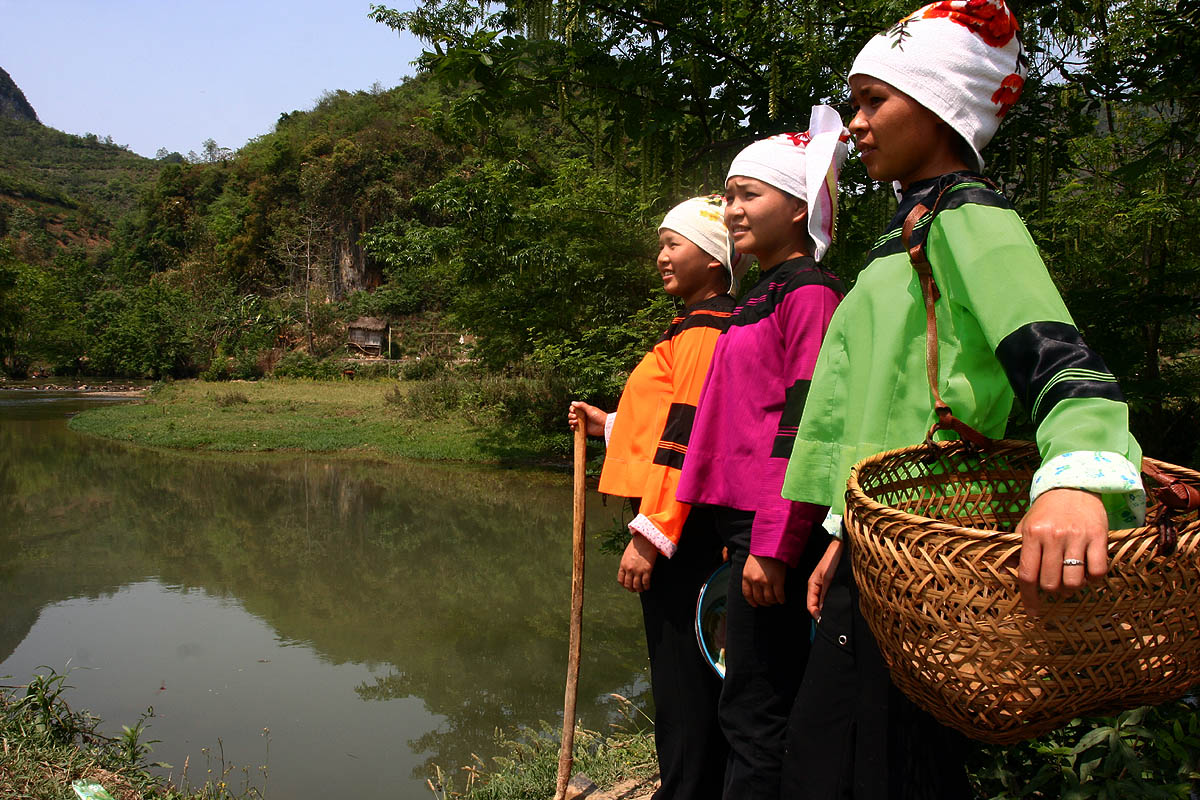
Zhuang

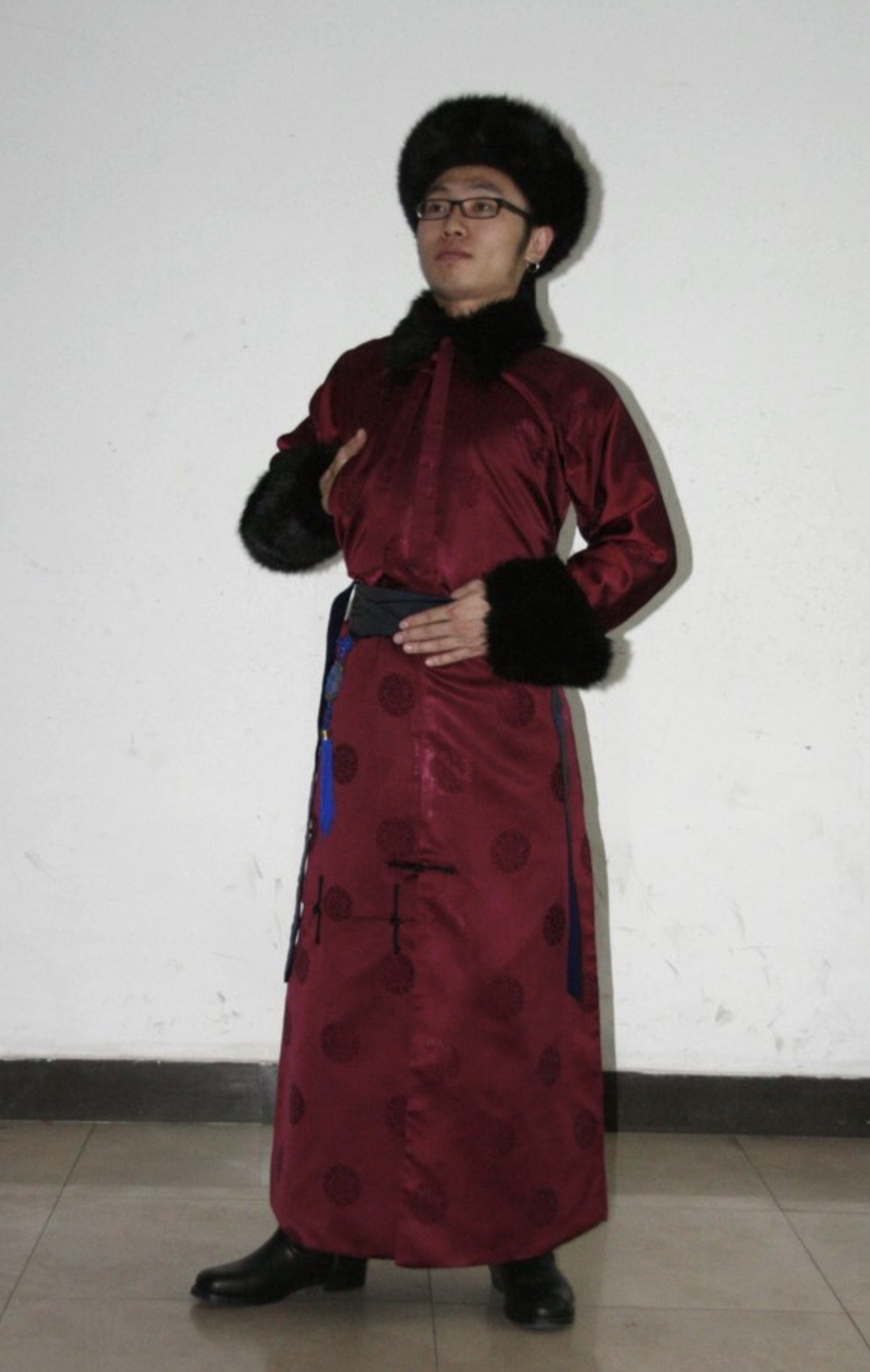
Manchu

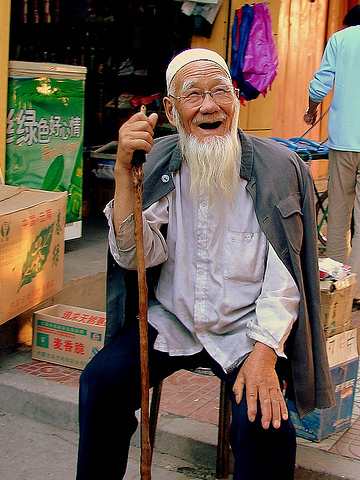
Hui

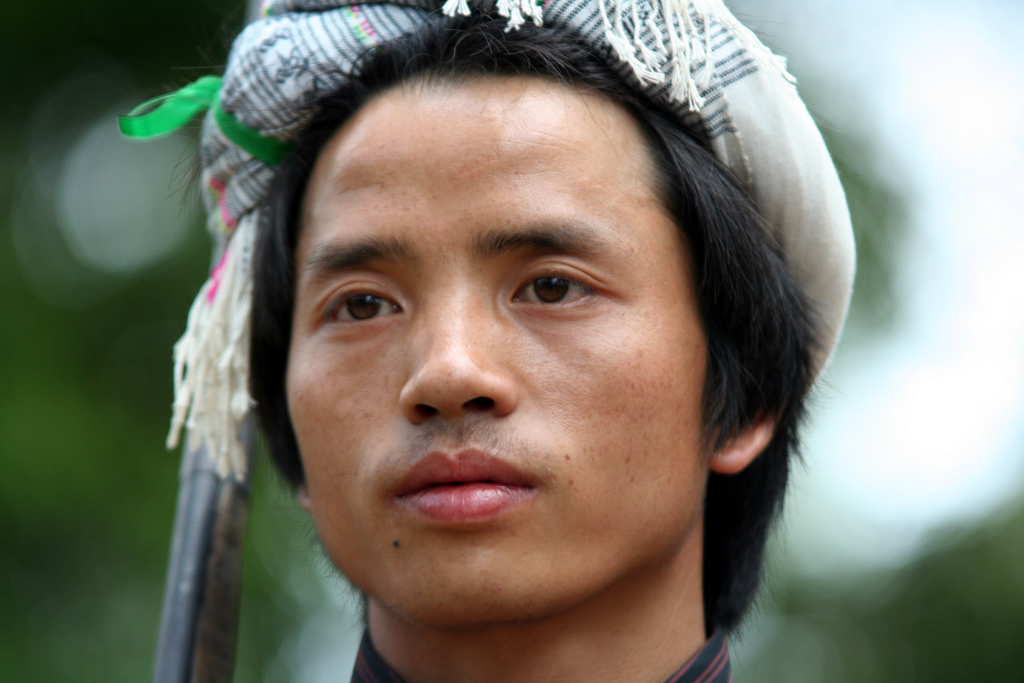
Miao

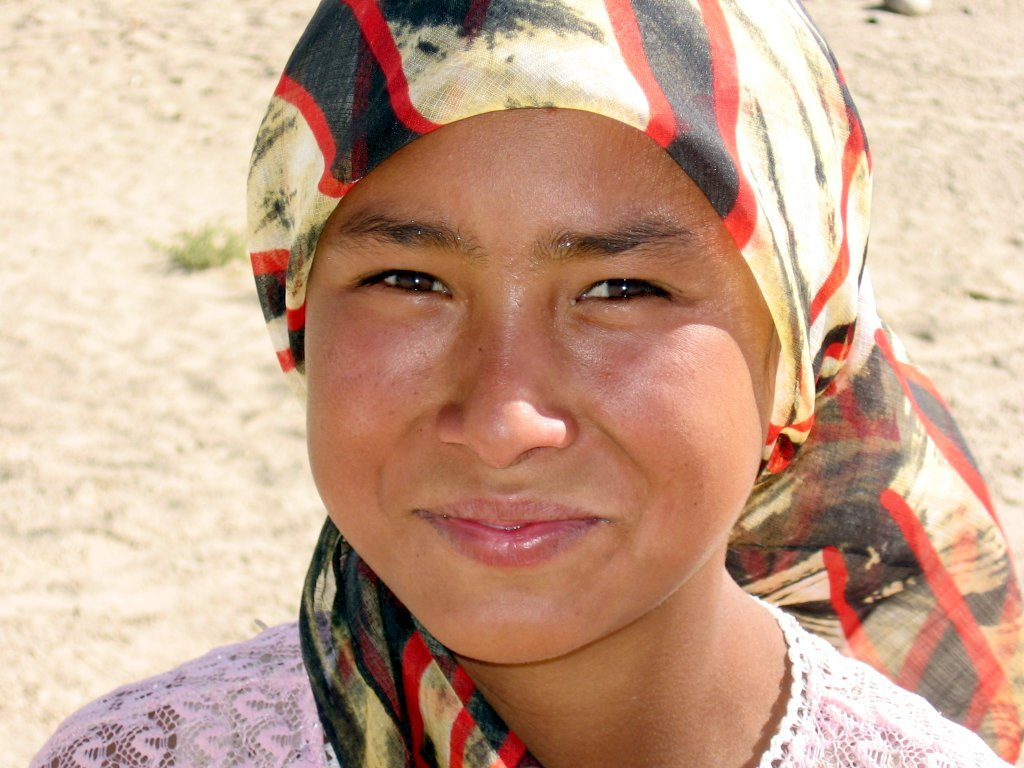
Uyghur

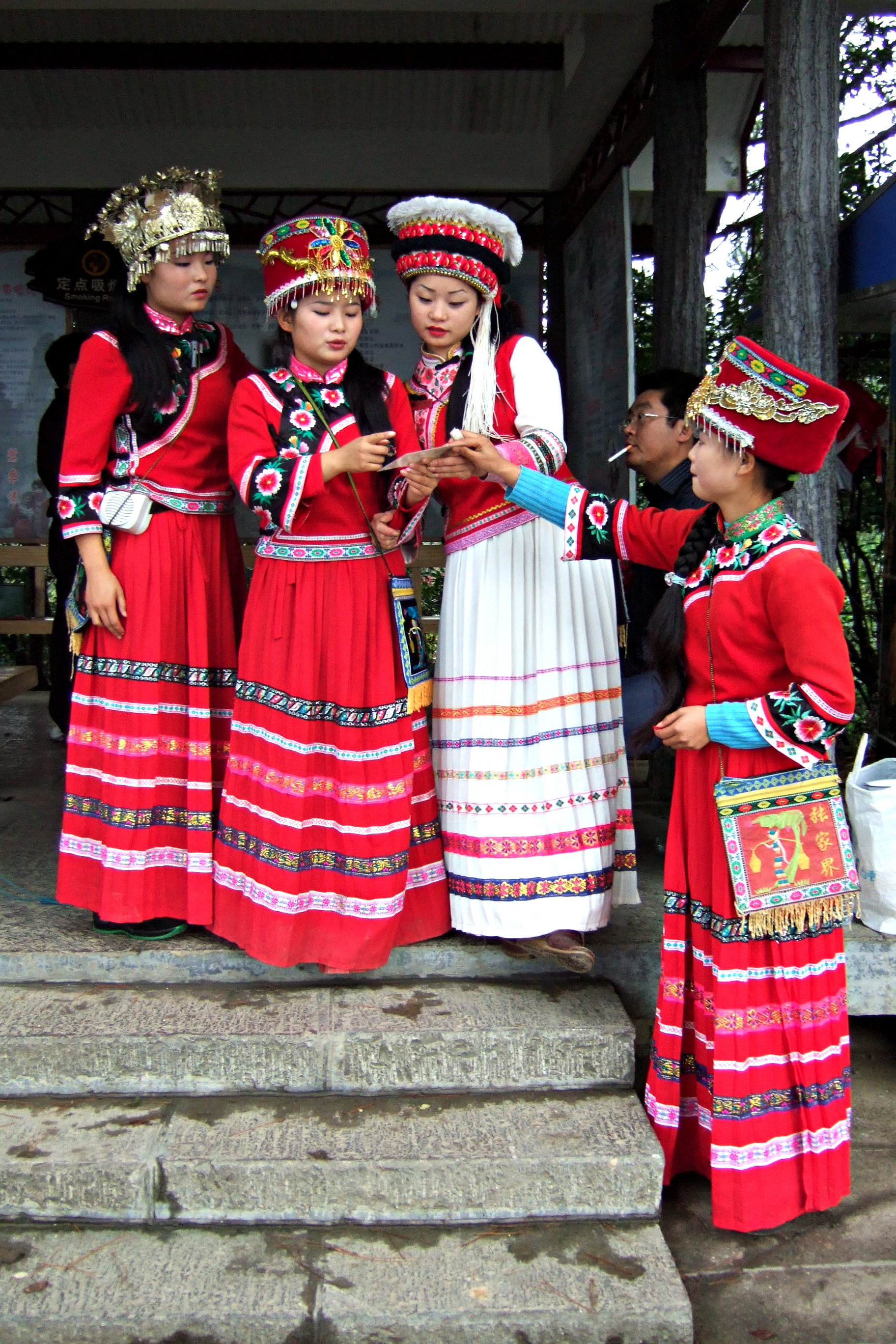
Tujia

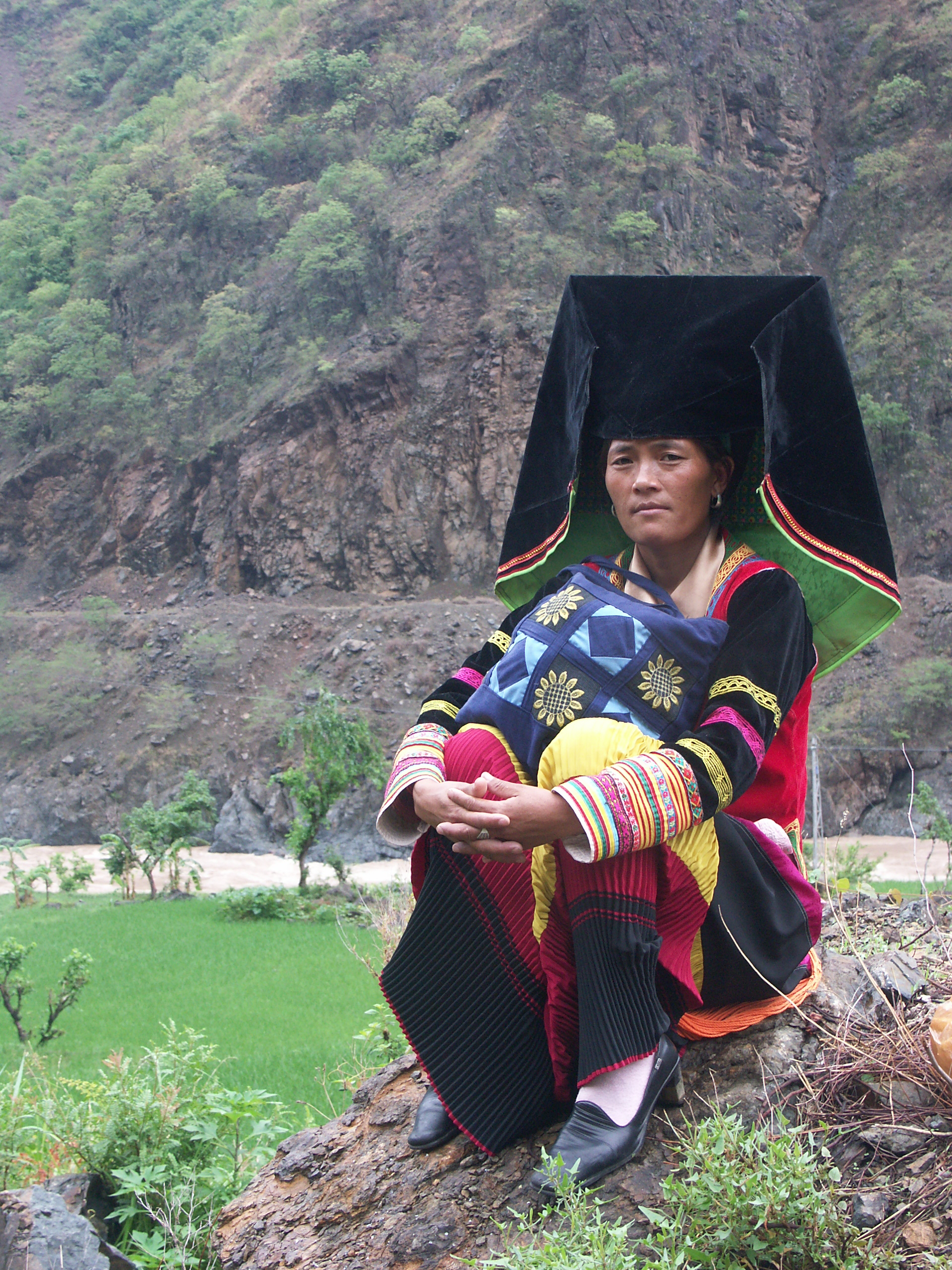
Yi

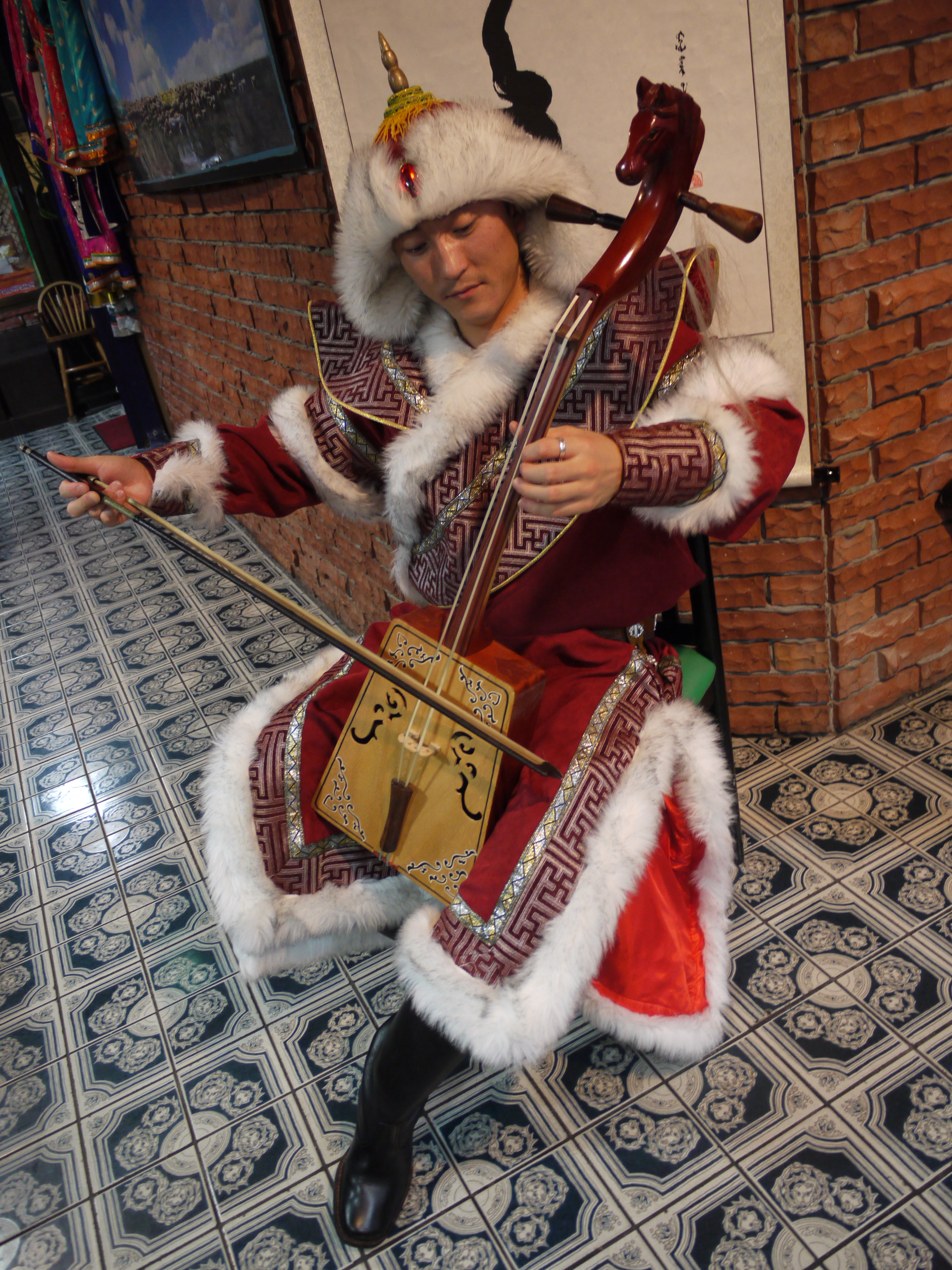
Mongol

== See also ==
- 56 Flowers
- Affirmative action in China
- Demographics of China
- Demographics of Taiwan
- Local ethnic nationalism
- Taiwanese people
- Ethnic minorities in China
- Han Chinese subgroups
- Hua–Yi distinction
- Languages of China
- List of endangered languages in China
- Kra–Dai ethnic groups in China
- Taiwanese indigenous peoples
- Unrecognized ethnic groups in China
- Minzu (anthropology)
  - Zhonghua minzu
