= Six Widows Case =

1908 Singapore legal case

The Six Widows Case, officially Re Estate of Choo Eng Choon, (Note: The deceased's name is sometimes rendered "Choo Eng Neo". The case is sometimes rendered Choo Eng Neo v Neo Chan-Neo.) 12 Straits Settlements Law Reports 120, was a 1908 decision of the Supreme Court of the Straits Settlements, affirmed by the appeal division of that court. (Note: The Supreme Court of the Straits Settlements was created by an 1868 ordinance and an appeal division was created by ordinance in 1873. See "Judicial History". Supreme Court of Singapore.)

Choo Eng Choon, who was a bank comprador, died intestate in Singapore, leaving a large estate. Six claimants alleged that they were widows of the deceased and therefore entitled to a portion of his estate under the Statute of Distribution. The question was initially referred to C. E. Velge, a registrar. Velge found that one "principal wife" had pre-deceased Choo Eng Choon and that after her death another claimant became his "principal wife" and three others were "inferior or secondary wives"; the other two were deemed not to be wives at all. Thus, Registrar Velge held that at least one of Choo Eng Choon's marriages had been bigamous.

Velge's decision was appealed on the ground that polygamy is not recognised in Chinese law. The appeal began in October 1905. The court received expert testimony on Chinese law, including from China's consul-general to Singapore (who testified about the Great Qing Legal Code), attesting that polygamy was impermissible. Litigants in the Six Widows Case unsuccessfully challenged the holding in Re Goods of Lao Leong An (1867), WOC 35, 1 SSLR 1. In that case, Peter Benson Maxwell had recognised the concept of tsip or t'sip and held that a claimant who was a tsip was entitled to a portion of the deceased's estate.

Chief Justice Archibald Fitzgerald Law made his decision on appeal from Velge's determination in 1908. In his decision, Chief Justice Law recognised the legal status of tsip, reportedly a form of concubinage, in Chinese law. However, since he had to render his decision according to English law, which did not recognise any intermediate status between a person's being a wife and not being a wife, Chief Justice Law held that Chinese law did permit polygamy. Chief Justice Law's decision was upheld on further appeal by Chief Justice William Henry Hyndman Jones and Justice Thomas Braddell. Justice Thomas Sercombe Smith dissented.

== Sources ==
- Braddell, Roland St. John (1921b). "Chinese Marriages, as regarded by the Supreme Court of the Straits Settlements". Journal of the Straits Branch of the Royal Asiatic Society. 83 (83): 153–165. ISSN 2304-7534. JSTOR 41561377.
- Freedman, Maurice (1979). Skinner, G. William (ed.). The Study of Chinese Society: Essays. Stanford University Press. ISBN 9780804709644. OCLC 1151350262.
- Wee, Kenneth K.S. (1974). "English Law and Chinese Family Custom in Singapore: The Problem of Fairness in Adjudication". Malaya Law Review. 16 (1): 52–82. ISSN 0542-335X. JSTOR 24863025.
