= Boat Dwellers =

Boat-dwelling ethnic group in southern China

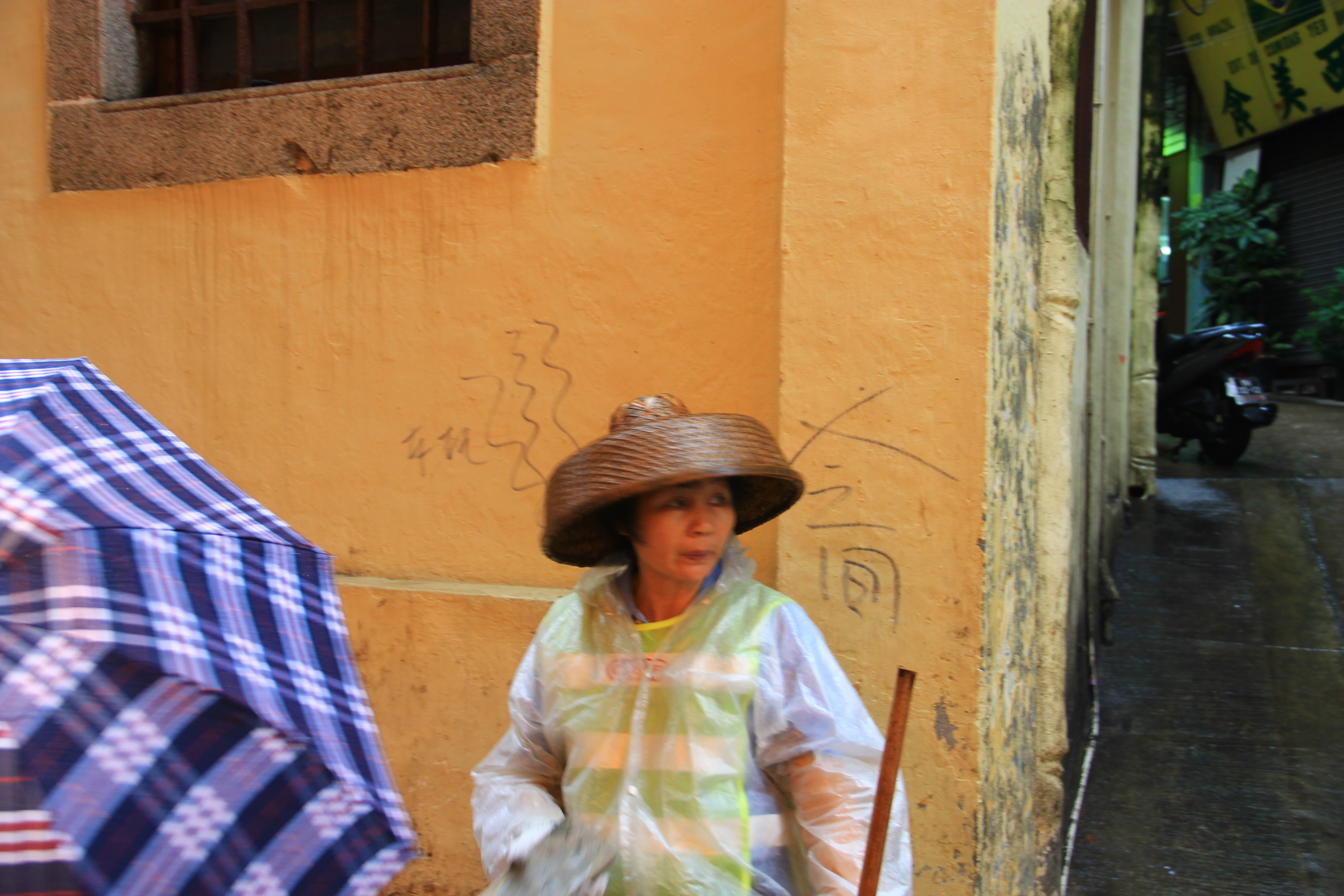
- Boat Dweller woman in Macau

Regions with significant populations
- China Hong Kong Macau: Guangdong, Guangxi, Fujian, Hainan, Shanghai, Zhejiang cities along Yangtze river

Languages
- Tanka dialect of Yue (Cantonese), Fuzhou dialect of Eastern Min (Fuzhou Tanka), Standard Chinese, other varieties of Chinese, for those living in the diaspora speak English, Vietnamese, Khmer, Tetun, Burmese, Thai, Hindi, Bengali, Malay (both Malaysian / Bruneian and Indonesian), Spanish, Portuguese (including Macau), French, Fijian, Creole and Dutch

Religion
- Chinese folk religions (including Taoism, Confucianism, ancestral worship and others), Mahayana Buddhism and Christianity.

Boat Dwellers
- Traditional Chinese: 1. 蜑家; 2. 艇家; 3. 水上人; 4. 曲蹄; 5. 蜑民; 6. 曲蹄囝
- Literal meaning: 1. Dan families 2. boat households 3. people on water 4. crooked hoof, bowlegged 5. Dan people 6. crooked hoof children, bowlegged children
Transcriptions
Standard Mandarin
- Hanyu Pinyin: 1. Dànjiā; 2. Tǐngjiā; 3. Shuǐshàngrén
Yue: Cantonese
- Yale Romanization: 1. Daahngā; 2. Téhnggā; 3. Séuiseuhngyàn; 4. Kūktài
- Jyutping: 1. Daan6gaa1; 2. Teng5gaa1; 3. Seoi2soeng6jan4; 4. Kuk1tai4
Eastern Min
- Fuzhou BUC: 4. Kuóh-dà̤; 5. Dáng-mìng; 6. Kuóh-dà̤-giāng

The Boat Dwellers, also known as Shuishangren (Chinese: 水上人; pinyin: shuǐshàng rén; Cantonese Yale: Séuiseuhngyàn; "people living on the water") or Boat People, or the Tankas, are an unrecognized ethnic group in China who traditionally lived on boats and junks in coastal parts of China's Guangdong, Guangxi, Fujian, Hainan, Zhejiang, cities along Yangtze river, as well as Hong Kong, and Macau. The Boat Dwellers are referred to with other names outside of Guangdong.

Though many now live onshore, some from the older generations still live on their boats and pursue their traditional livelihood of fishing.

The origins of the Boat Dwellers can be traced back to the native ethnic minorities of southern China known historically as the Baiyue, who may have taken refuge on the sea and gradually assimilated into Han Chinese culture. However, they have preserved many of their native traditions not found in Han culture. A small number of Boat Dwellers also live in parts of Vietnam. There they are called Dan (Đản) and are classified as a subgroup of the Ngái ethnicity.

Historically, the Boat Dwellers were considered outcasts. Since they lived by or on the sea, they were sometimes referred to as "sea gypsies" by both Chinese and British.

== Etymology and terminology ==
According to official Liu Zongyuan (773–819) of the Tang dynasty, there were Boat Dweller people settled in the boats of today's Guangdong Province and Guangxi Zhuang Autonomous Region.

The term "Tanka" (蜑家) may originate from tan (Cantonese: "egg") and ka (Cantonese: "family" or "people"), although another possible etymology is tank ("junk" or "large boat") rather than tan. "Tanka" is now considered derogatory and is no longer in common usage. The Boat Dwellers are now referred to in China as "people on/above water" (Chinese: 水上人; pinyin: shuǐshàng rén; Cantonese Yale: Séuiseuhngyàn), or "people of the southern sea" (Chinese: 南海人; Cantonese Yale: Nàamhóiyàn). No standardised English translation of this term exists. "Boat People" is a commonly used translation, although it may be confused with the similar term for Vietnamese refugees in Hong Kong. "Boat Dwellers" was proposed by Dr. Lee Ho Yin of The University of Hong Kong in 1999, and it has been adopted by the Hong Kong Museum of History for its exhibition.

Both the Boat Dwellers and the Cantonese speak Cantonese. However, Boat Dwellers living in Fujian speak Fuzhounese.

Boat Dwellers have lost their original language. James Hayes, the Hong Kong historian in his 1974 article in the Journal of the Hong Kong Branch of the Royal Asiatic Society, "The Hong Kong Region: Its Place in Traditional Chinese Historiography and Principal Events Since the Establishment of Hsin-an County in 1573" (Oxford University Press, 1977), notes that “By the early 20th century, most boat-dwelling families in Hong Kong spoke Cantonese fluently, and their original dialect had largely disappeared from daily use.”

Maurice Freedman, the social anthropologist on Chinese society, also observed in his 1966 work "Chinese Lineage and Society" that “The Tanka had no written language and their spoken tongue was increasingly indistinguishable from regional Cantonese by the late 19th century.”

The Boat Dwellers of the Yangtze region were called the nine-surname fishermen households (九姓漁戶), while Boat Dweller families living on land were simply jiànmín, a general term for pariahs or outcastes. (Note: Pariahs or outcastes (賤民; jiànmín; 'base/lowly people') included various peoples and professionals of the lowest social status outside of the four occupations in imperial China, contrasted with ordinary subjects (良民; liángmín; 'virtuous/respectable people').)

In Hong Kong, there were two distinct categories of people based on their way of life: the Hakka and Cantonese lived on land, while the Boat Dwellers and the Hoklo lived on boats and were classified as boat people. Though, like the Boat Dwellers, Cantonese and Hakka sometimes fished for a living, the land fishermen did not mix with the Boat Dweller fishermen. Boat Dweller people were barred from Cantonese and Hakka celebrations.

British reports on Hong Kong described the Boat Dwellers, including Hoklo-speaking Boat Dwellers, living in Hong Kong "since time unknown." The Encyclopedia Americana asserted that Boat Dweller people lived on boats in and around Hong Kong "since prehistoric times."

== Geographic distribution ==
The Boat Dwellers live throughout China, including places such as:

- Zhejiang: Zhoushan Archipelago, Taizhou Bay, Wenzhou Bay, Sanmen Bay, Hangzhou Bay, Xin'an River, Fuchun River, Lanjiang River
- Fujian: Min River Mouth, Fuqing Bay, Xinghua Bay, Quanzhou Bay, Amoy Bay, Zhangzhou Water Front
- Guangdong: Jieshi Bay, Honghai Bay, Daya Bay, Dapeng Bay, Zhujiang River Mouth, Leizhou Bay, Lingding Sea, Zhanjiang, Wanshan Archipelago
- Guangxi: You River
- Anhui: Xin'an River
- Jiangxi: Gan River
- Hainan: Qiongzhou Strait, Sanya Bay
- Beijing, Jiangsu, Henan, Hubei, Hunan: Grand Canal
- Shanghai: city river
- Hong Kong: Kowloon, Hong Kong Island
- Macau: Macau Bay

== Origins ==
=== Mythical origins ===
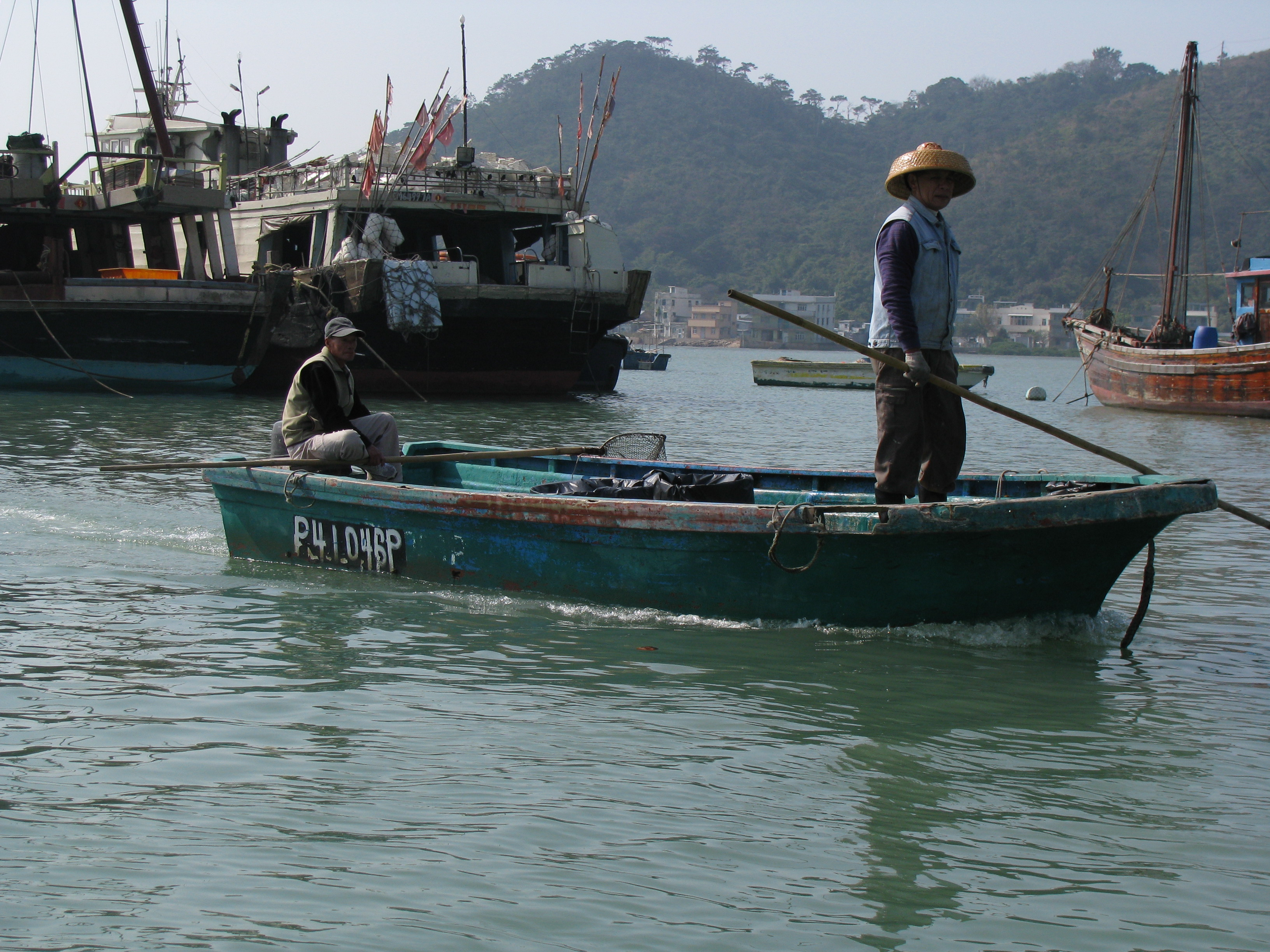
Boat Dwellers in Hong Kong

Some Chinese myths claim that animals were the ancestors of the Barbarians, including the Boat Dweller people. Some ancient Chinese sources claimed that water snakes were the ancestors of the Boat Dwellers, saying that they could last for three days in the water, without breathing air.

==== Mongol origins ====
After all male Mongols were killed, the few surviving female Mongols became Chinese Boat Dwellers.

=== Baiyue origins in Southern China ===
The Boat Dwellers are considered by some scholars to be related to other minority peoples of southern China, such as the Yao and Li people (Miao). The Amoy University anthropologist Ling Hui-hsiang wrote his theory of the Fujian Boat Dwellers as descendants of the Baiyue. He claimed that Guangdong and Fujian Boat Dwellers are definitely descended from the old Baiyue peoples, and that they may have been ancestors of the Malay race.

The Boat Dwellers inherited their lifestyle and culture from the original Yue peoples who inhabited Hong Kong during the Neolithic era. After the First Emperor of China conquered Hong Kong, groups from northern and central China moved into the general area of Guangdong, including Hong Kong.

One theory proposes that the ancient Yue inhabitants of southern China are the ancestors of the modern Boat Dwellers. The majority of western academics subscribe to this theory, and use Chinese historical sources. (The ancient Chinese used the term "Yue" to refer to all southern Barbarians.) The Oxford English Dictionary states that the ancestors of the Boat Dwellers were native people.

The ancestors of the Boat Dwellers were pushed to the southern coast by Chinese peasants who took over their land.

During the British colonial era in Hong Kong, the Boat Dwellers were considered a separate ethnic group from the Punti ("locals"), Hakka, and Hoklo.

The Boat Dwellers have been compared to the She people by some historians, as both are ethnic minorities descended from natives of Southern China who now practice Han Chinese culture.

==== Yao connections ====
Chinese scholars and gazettes described the Boat Dwellers as a "Yao" tribe, with some other sources noting that "Tan" people lived at Lantau, and other sources saying "Yao" people lived there. As a result, they refused to obey the salt monopoly of the Song dynasty (Sung dynasty; 960–1276/1279) government. The county gazetteer of Sun On in 1729 described the Boat Dwellers as "Yao barbarians."

In modern times, the Boat Dwellers claim to be ordinary Chinese who happen to fish for a living, and speak the local dialect.

=== Historiography ===
Some southern Chinese historic views of the Boat Dwellers were that they were a separate aboriginal ethnic group, rather than a Han Chinese subgroup. Chinese Imperial records also claim that the Boat Dwellers were descendants of aboriginals. Boat Dwellers were also called "sea gypsies" (海上吉普賽人).

The Boat Dwellers were regarded as Yueh and not Chinese, and were divided into three classifications in the 12th century, "the fish-Tan, the oyster-Tan, and the wood-Tan," based on what they did for a living.

The three groups of Punti, Hakka, and Hoklo, all of whom spoke different Chinese dialects, despised and fought each other during the late Qing dynasty. However, they were all united in their overwhelming hatred for the Boat Dwellers, since the aboriginals of Southern China were the ancestors of the Boat Dwellers. The Cantonese Punti had displaced the indigenous Boat Dwellers after they began conquering southern China.

The Nankai University of Tianjin published the Nankai social and economic quarterly, Volume 9 in 1936, and it referred to the Boat Dwellers as aboriginal descendants before Chinese assimilation. The scholar Jacques Gernet also wrote that the Boat Dwellers were aboriginals known as pirates (haidao), which hindered Qing dynasty attempts to assert control in Guangdong.

=== Scholarly opinions on Baiyue connection ===
The most widely held theory is that the Boat Dwellers are the descendants of the native Yue inhabitants of Guangdong before the Han Cantonese moved in. The theory states that the Yue peoples inhabited the region at the time of the Chinese conquest when they were either absorbed or expelled to southern regions. The Boat Dwellers, according to this theory, are descended from an outcast Yue tribe who preserved their separate culture.

Regarding the Fujian Minyue kingdom era Boat Dwellers it is suggested that in the southeast coastal regions of China, there were many sea nomads during the Neolithic era and they may have spoken ancestral Austronesian languages, and were skilled seafarers. In fact, there is evidence that an Austronesian language was still spoken in Fujian as late as 620 AD. Some therefore believe that the Boat Dwellers were Austronesians who could be more closely related to other Austronesian groups such as Filipinos, Javanese, or Balinese.

Eugene Newton Anderson in 1970 claimed that there was no evidence for any of the conjectures put forward by scholars on the Boat Dwellers' origins, citing Chen Xujing, who stated that "to what tribe or race they once belonged or were once akin to is still unknown".

Some researchers say the origin of the Boat Dwellers is multifaceted, with some of them having native Yueh ancestors and others having ancestors from other places.

A minority of scholars claim that the Boat Dwellers and the Han Cantonese are both descended from people indigenous to the region.

=== Genetics ===
Fujian Boat Dwellers have customs similar to Daic and Austronesian peoples. They have a closer genetic affinity with Daic populations than Han Chinese in paternal lineages, but are closely clustered with southern Han populations (such as Hakka and Teochew) in maternal lineages. It is hypothesized that the Fujian Boat Dwellers mainly originate from the ancient indigenous Daic people and have only limited gene flows from Han Chinese populations.

Another study on the Boat Dwellers concluded that the Boat Dwellers people not only had a close genetic relationship with both northern Han and ancient Yellow River basin millet farmers but also possessed more southern East Asian ancestry related to Austronesian, Kra-Dai and Hmong-Mien people compared to southern Han. Boat Dweller people had their own unique genetic structure, but kept a close relationship with geographically close southern Han Chinese populations. The results supported the claim that the Boat Dweller people arose from the admixture between southward migration Han Chinese and southern indigenous people.

== History ==
=== Sinicisation ===
The Song dynasty engaged in extensive sinicisation of the region with Han people. After many years of sinicisation and assimilation, the Boat Dwellers now identify as Han Chinese, though they also have non-Han ancestry from the natives of Southern China. The Cantonese would often buy fish from the Boat Dwellers. In some inland regions, the Boat Dwellers accounted for half of the total population. The Boat Dwellers of southern Fujian were registered as barbarian households.

=== Ming dynasty ===
The Boat Dweller boat population were not registered into the national census as they were of outcast status, with an official imperial edict declaring them untouchable.

==== Macau and Portuguese rule ====
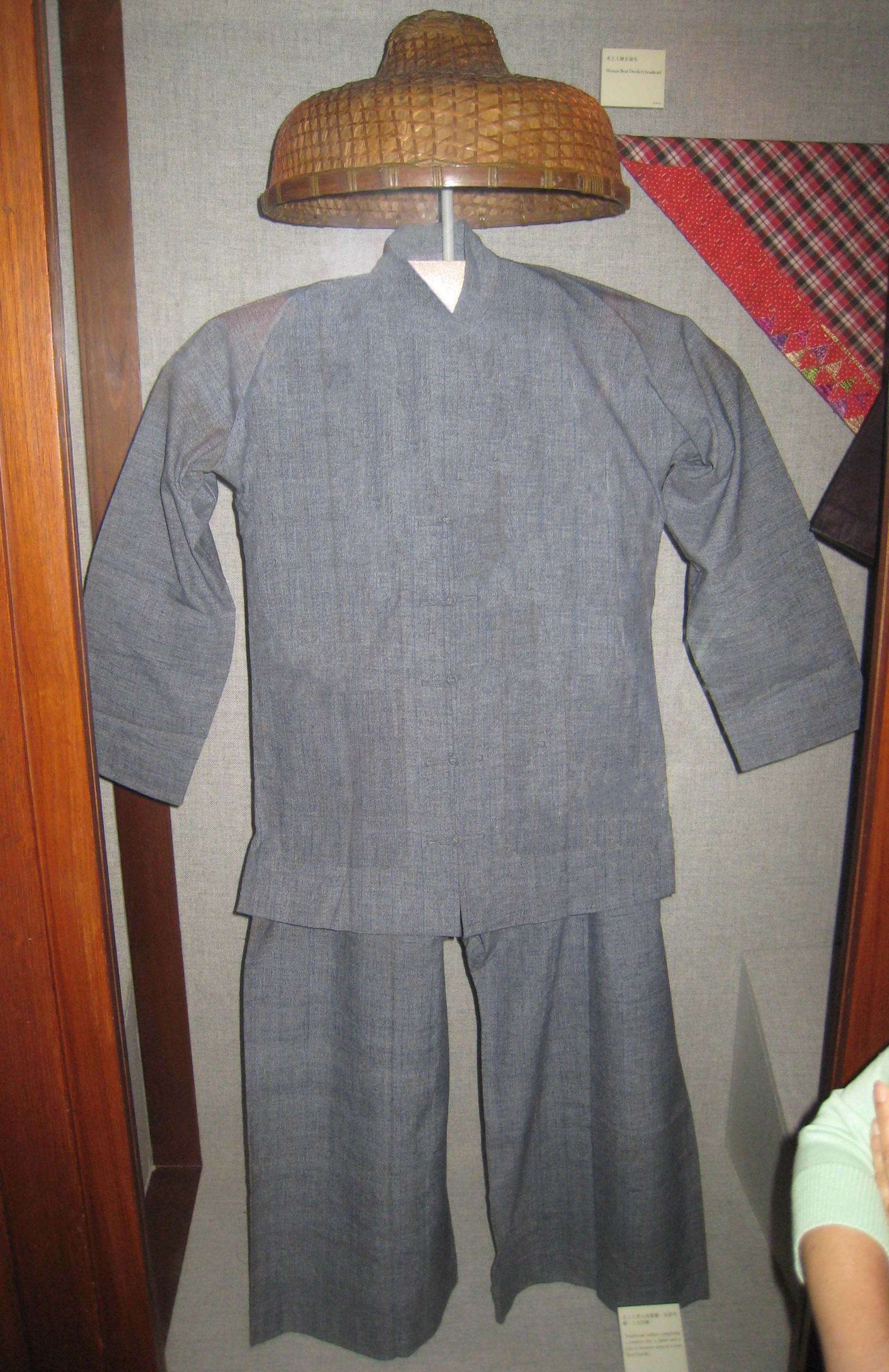
Traditional Tanka people clothes in a Hong Kong museum.

When the Portuguese arrived at Macau, enslaved women from Goa (part of Portuguese India), Siam, Indochina, and Malaya became their wives. However, Boat Dwellers also mixed and married with the Portuguese, though many other Chinese women did not. This is likely because the lower-class Boat Dwellers were less tightly bound by expectations prohibiting exogamy than higher-class people were. Some of the Boat Dwellers' descendants became Macanese people.

Boat Dwellers would also supply fish for the Portuguese, as they did for the Cantonese, an activity which is mentioned in a poem by Chinese poet Wu Li.

Some Boat Dweller children were kidnapped and enslaved by Portuguese raiders.

Literature in Macau was written about love affairs and marriage between the Boat Dweller women and Portuguese men, like "A-Chan, A Tancareira", by Henrique de Senna Fernandes.

=== Qing dynasty ===
Boat Dwellers mostly worked as fishermen and tended to gather at some bays. Some built markets or villages on the shore, while others continued to live on their junks or boats. They claimed to be Han Chinese.

The Qing edict said "Cantonese people regard the Dan households as being of the mean class (beijian zhi) and do not allow them to settle on shore. The Dan households, for their part, dare not struggle with the common people", this edict was issued in 1729.

As Hong Kong developed, some of the fishing grounds in Hong Kong became badly polluted or were reclaimed, and so became land. Those Boat Dwellers who only own small boats and cannot fish far out to sea are forced to stay inshore in bays, gathering together like floating villages.

==== Canton (Guangzhou) ====
The ancestors of the Boat Dwellers were the natives of Southern China before the Cantonese expelled them to the water, forbidding the Boat Dwellers to marry land-dwelling Chinese or live on land. They did not practice foot binding, and their dialect was unique. They also formed a class of prostitutes in Canton, operating the boats in Canton's Pearl River which functioned as brothels.

=== Modern China ===
Boat Dwellers were among the many people that remained in Nanjing in December 1939 before the Japanese massacred the population.

During the intensive land reclamation efforts around the islands of Shanghai in the late 1960s, many Boat Dwellers were settled on Hengsha Island and organised as fishing brigades.

Post 1949: Removal of Tanka people as "Mean” (贱), which existed under the caste-like system in imperial China

The term “Tanka” itself is now considered derogatory. Tanka (疍家人) were historically considered “Mean” (贱) under the caste-like system in imperial China, especially in southern coastal regions like Guangdong, Guangxi, and Fujian. They were discriminated against, and were excluded from civil service exams and many social privileges.

The Chinese Communist Party (CCP) officially abolished the legal and social classification of “mean” (贱) groups —including the Tanka boat people — after coming to power in 1949. These groups had long been stigmatized under imperial and Republican-era systems for hundreds of years, often barred from land ownership, education, and intermarriage with “good” (良) households.

Under Communist reforms after 1949, the CCP abolished hereditary status distinctions. This included the “mean” vs “good” household divide. The government promoted class-based identity (e.g., worker, peasant) over ethnic or caste-like categories. Tanka people were legally equalized, allowed to settle on land, and encouraged to integrate into main-stream society.

=== British Hong Kong ===
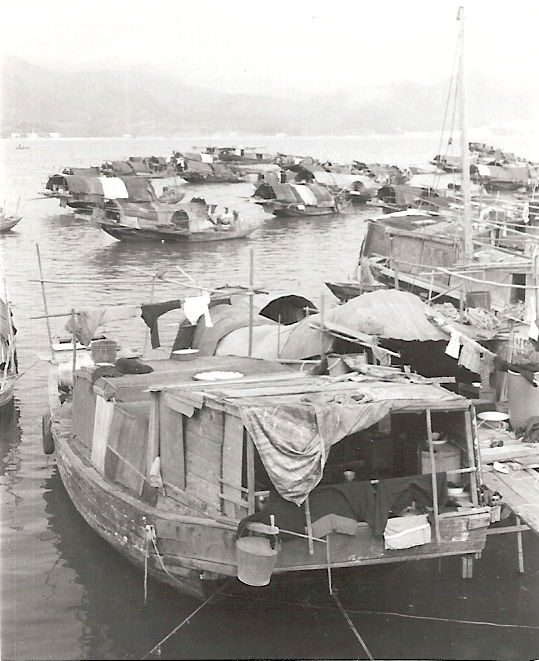
Hong Kong boat dwellings in December 1970.

In 1937, Walter Schofield, then a Cadet Officer in the Hong Kong Civil Service, wrote that at that time the Boat Dwellers were "boat-people [who sometimes lived] in boats hauled ashore, or in more or less boat-shaped huts, as at Shau Kei Wan and Tai O". They mainly lived at the harbours at Cheung Chau, Aberdeen, Tai O, Po Toi, Kau Sai Chau and Yau Ma Tei.

Many Boat Dweller women worked as prostitutes to British sailors, and Boat Dwellers assisted the British in their military actions around Hong Kong. The Boat Dwellers also assisted the Europeans with supplies. Due to their marginal position in Chinese society, and the fact that they lacked access to many of the privileges that societal integration could afford them, Boat Dwellers were not as tightly bound by social pressure and Confucian ethics as other ethnic groups when interacting with foreigners. In many cases, closeness with foreigners could serve as a "ladder to financial security, if not respectability," especially for women, many of whom became sex workers.

Other Chinese prostitutes were afraid of serving Westerners since they looked strange to them, but the Boat Dweller prostitutes freely mingled with Western men. Boat Dwellers were already ostracized from the Cantonese community, and the perception of women as prostitutes compounded this. Boat Dweller women were criticized as "low-class" and rude, and were nicknamed "saltwater girls" (ham sui mui in Cantonese). Stereotypes about Boat Dweller women were so common among Chinese people in Canton that, during the Republican era, the Chinese government inflated their count of prostitutes by assuming large numbers of Boat Dweller women were prostitutes without evidence.

Despite the negative perspective of them, the brothels run by Boat Dweller prostitutes were reportedly very well kept and tidy.

Some Boat Dweller women who worked as prostitutes for foreigners also kept a "nursery" of Boat Dweller girls in order to export them for prostitution work in overseas Chinese communities, such as in Australia or America, or to serve as concubines. In 1882, a report ("Correspondence respecting the alleged existence of Chinese slavery in Hong Kong: presented to both Houses of Parliament by Command of Her Majesty") was presented to the English Parliament concerning the existence of slavery in Hong Kong, of which many were Boat Dweller girls serving as prostitutes or mistresses to Westerners.

Ernest John Eitel claimed in 1895 that all "half-caste" people in Hong Kong were descended exclusively from Europeans' relationships with Boat Dweller women, rather than Chinese women. Though this claim is somewhat historically supported, it has also been criticized as a "myth" spread by other Chinese peoples to express xenophobia towards Hong Kong's Eurasian community.

During British rule some special schools were created for the Boat Dwellers. In 1962 a typhoon struck boats belonging to the Boat Dwellers, likely including Hoklo-speaking Boat Dwellers mistaken for being Hoklo, destroying hundreds.

During the 1970s the number of Boat Dwellers living on boats was reported to be shrinking.

=== Shanghai ===
Boat Dweller women also worked as prostitutes in Shanghai, where they were grouped separately from the Cantonese prostitutes. They continued to live on boats.

== Surnames ==
The Fuzhou Boat Dwellers have different surnames than the Boat Dwellers of Guangdong. Cantonese records indicate that "Weng, Ou, Chi, Pu, Jiang, and Hai" (翁, 歐, 池, 浦, 江, 海) were surnames of the Fuzhou Boat Dwellers. Cantonese records also stated that Boat Dweller surnames in Guangdong consisted of "Mai, Pu, Wu, Su, and He" (麥, 濮, 吴, 蘇, 何), alternatively some people claimed Gu and Zeng as Boat Dweller surnames.

== Language ==
The Boat Dwellers speak a variety of Yue Chinese. It is similar in phonology with Cantonese, with the following differences:

- eu /œ/ is pronounced as o /ɔ/ (e.g. "Hong Kong")
- /y/ is pronounced as /u/ or /i/
- /kʷ/ is pronounced as /k/
- no final -m or -p, so they are replaced by -ng /-ŋ/ or -t /-t/
- /n/ is pronounced as /l/, like in some informal varieties of Cantonese
- they also have the tone 2 diminutive change

== DNA tests and disease ==
Tests on the DNA of the Boat Dwellers found that the disease Thalassemia was common among them. Tests also stated that their ancestors were not Han Chinese, but were another Chinese ethnicity. The frequency of lung cancer is also higher among the Boat Dwellers than among the Cantonese and Teochew.

== Notable Boat Dwellers ==
- Ng Akew, smuggler
- Ho Fook, Hong Kong compradore and philanthropist.
- Sinn Sing Hoi, composer from Macau.
- Henry Fok, billionaire businessman and politician.
- Timothy Fok
- Roger Kwok, singer

== See also ==
- Pang uk
- Fuzhou Tanka
- Aberdeen floating village in Hong Kong
- Yau Ma Tei Boat People in Hong Kong

== Bibliography ==
- Chaves, Jonathan (1993). Singing of the source: nature and god in the poetry of the Chinese painter Wu Li. University of Hawaii Press. ISBN 0-8248-1485-1.
- Christina Miu Bing Cheng (1999). Macau: a cultural Janus. Hong Kong University Press. ISBN 962-209-486-4.
- Great Britain. Parliament (1882). Correspondence respecting the alleged existence of Chinese slavery in Hong Kong: presented to both Houses of Parliament by Command of Her Majesty Volume 3185 of C (Series) (Great Britain. Parliament) (reprint ed.). Printed by G.E. Eyre and W. Spottiswoode for H.M.S.O.
- This article incorporates text from Europe in China: the history of Hongkong from the beginning to the year 1882, by Eitel, Ernest John, a publication from 1895, now in the public domain in the United States.
- João de Pina-Cabral (2002). Between China and Europe: person, culture and emotion in Macao. Vol. 74 of London School of Economics monographs on social anthropology. Berg. ISBN 0-8264-5749-5.
- Hansson, Anders (1996). Chinese outcasts: discrimination and emancipation in late imperial China. Vol. 37 of Sinica Leidensia. BRILL. ISBN 90-04-10596-4.
- This article incorporates text from The Century dictionary: an encyclopedic lexicon of the English language, Part 21, by Whitney, William Dwight, a publication from 1891, now in the public domain in the United States.
- This article incorporates text from The Century Dictionary and Cyclopedia: The Century dictionary ... prepared under the superintendence of William Dwight Whitney ... rev. & enl. under the superintendence of Benjamin E. Smith, by Whitney, William Dwight and Smith, Benjamin Eli, a publication from 1911, now in the public domain in the United States.
- This article incorporates text from The Middle kingdom: a survey of the ... Chinese empire and its inhabitants ..., by Williams, Samuel Wells, a publication from 1848, now in the public domain in the United States.
- This article incorporates text from The Field afar, Volumes 15–16, by Catholic Foreign Mission Society of America, Catholic Foreign Mission Bureau of Boston, a publication from 1921, now in the public domain in the United States.
