= Ng Akew =

Chinese protected woman and opium smuggler (c.1820–c.1880)

- 吳亞嬌
- Born: c. 1820
- Died: c. 1880
- Occupations: Opium smuggler; property owner
- Known for: Cumsingmum Affair
- Children: 5

Ng Akew (Note: Also cited as Ong Akew, Ong Mo Kew, Hung Mo Kew and Hung Mow Kew (red–haired Kew).) (Chinese: 吳亞嬌; c. 1820 – c. 1880) was a Chinese protected woman, opium smuggler and property owner active in British Hong Kong. A central figure in the "Cumsingmum Affair" of 1849, Akew attracted great attention as a cause célèbre.

== Early life ==
Akew was born around 1820 to a Tanka family, and grew up in the Pearl River Delta region of Canton (present-day Guangdong). In 1842, Akew was sold in Canton to James Bridges Endicott (1814–1870), an American captain on the opium-receiving ships of Russell & Company.

Akew became a protected women; a women "acquired" by and living under the "protection" of a Western man in a long-term sexual relationship. Almost entirely from the marginalised Tanka ethnic minority (Note: In British Hong Kong some protected women were purchased from brothels.), protected women were legally distinct from sex workers (who under British Hong Kong law were registered and inspected). Protected women were able to achieve an unofficial yet precarious social status, economic independence and local influence.

== Cumsingmum Affair ==
Establishing a small opium business using her own boats, Akew proved herself to be a capable trader. In 1848, Akew bought eight chests of opium from Endicott. When her boat and cargo was stolen by pirates, she traveled herself to the pirate base and negotiated compensation. Shortly after, an American ship was attacked and its cargo stolen by a pirate ship with Ng Akew present. The stolen cargo was later discovered in her own ship. It was assumed that she had negotiated with the pirates that the cargo from their next pirate attack would go to her as compensation for the cargo they stole from her. Her guilt could not be proven in court and she was therefore freed, but the case became famous in her time.

When Bridges Endicott retired to Macao he provided Ng Akew with property in Hong Kong, including two properties which, in 1852, he had placed in a trust for her.

== Personal life ==
Akew gave birth to 5 of Endicott's children. Akew died around 1880. (Note: Also cited as 1914.)
