= 56 Flowers =

56 Flowers 五十六朵花
- Also known as: FLWN56
- Origin: Beijing, China
- Years active: 2015-Present

Founded in 2015, the music group 56 Flowers is a Chinese music group that derives its name from the 56 ethnic groups of China and is also the basis for having 56 members with one coming from each individual ethnic group. The group is primarily dedicated to remixing songs from the Cultural Revolution into newer genres. While the group's main entertainment-based goals are to promote positive characteristics such as peace, unity, and purity.

== History ==
56 Flowers was founded and debuted at the Diaoyutai Guesthouse in 2015, the group debuted with their first song "The Chinese Dream is the most beautiful". The group also made a major performance in the Great Hall of the People in 2016.

== Reception ==
In the beginning of their debut, their Weibo account received a far higher ratio of dislikes compared to likes. Although through the same platform the group did not receive an overwhelming amount of dislikes, and some did defend the group claiming that the group was not responsible for the actions that occurred during the Cultural Revolution.

== Controversies ==
56 Flowers has attracted controversy over their usage of Red Songs and association with Maoism. In 2016, the group held a concert in the Great Hall of the People during the 50th anniversary of the Chinese Cultural Revolution. The act was both in praise of Maoism, and also in praise of Chinese Communist Party general secretary Xi Jinping. The move attracted condemnation from people such as Ma Xiaoli, whose father Ma Wenrui was persecuted during the Cultural Revolution. Backlash against the event led to two organizers of the event two withdraw their support for the event, claiming that they had been misled about the group's credentials. After that the government released an official apology over the group, claiming that once again that the group being promoted at the venue was a mistake.

The group is considered by some to be a means of propaganda, to promote an idol system that is in line with Chinese thought over entertainment. Likewise, 56 Flowers has attracted criticism for their usage of using school girls for their perception of purity to promote a specific message. The group's setup has attracted criticism for using their image to promote what some have called revisionist thinking in China, bringing in rhetoric from the days of the Cultural Revolution. This criticism also goes into the way the group is named, with a claim that the group's name is actually related to May 16, the date that CCP chairman Mao Zedong justified the cultural revolution.

56 Flowers has also attracted controversies over their connections with the CCP, with claims that many of their performances are booked by members of the CCP instead of from regular demand for the group.

There was speculation that the name 56 Flowers constituted one-upmanship over AKB48 after its claims to be the largest idol group at 56 members. In fact, other groups are larger, including AKB48 itself at 107 members.
