= Archibald Fitzgerald Law =

British barrister and colonial judge (1853-1921)

Sir Archibald Fitzgerald Law
- Born: February 1853
- Died: 26 July 1921 (aged 68); Wimborne, England
- Education: Oriel College, Oxford
- Occupation: Barrister
- Years active: 1880-1912

Sir Archibald Fitzgerald Law (February 1853 – 26 July 1921) was a British barrister and colonial judge.

== Early life and education ==
Archibald Fitzgerald Law was born in 1853. He was educated at Oriel College, Oxford, and was called to the bar of the Inner Temple in 1879. During his time at Oxford, Law was capped for England in rugby union.

== Career ==
In 1880, he went to Cyprus as Assistant Commissioner, and in 1883, was appointed President of the District Court of Famagusta. In 1886, he was appointed Principal Forest Officer, the following year was appointed member of the Legislative Council, and in 1890, served as Chief Secretary to the Government. After he took silk in 1892, he was appointed Attorney General.

In 1893, he went to the Straits Settlements as a Puisne Judge, and in 1894 was appointed to carry out a special enquiry in Perak. The following year, he was appointed Puisne Judge in Penang, and in 1906, was appointed Chief Judicial Commissioner of the Federated Malay States, whilst also serving on many occasions as acting Chief Justice of the Straits Settlements in Singapore in the absence of the Chief Justice. His most notable judgment was delivered in the Six Widows Case (1908) when he decided that secondary wives of the Chinese are entitled to share equally with primary wives in the widow's third under the Statute of Distributions. He retired in 1912.

== Personal life and death ==
In 1883, Law married Louisa Alice Squarey. He died on 26 July 1921 at Wimborne, Dorset, aged 68.

== Honours ==
Law was appointed a Knight Bachelor in 1908.
