= Fuzhou Boat Dwellers =

Ethnic group of Han Chinese

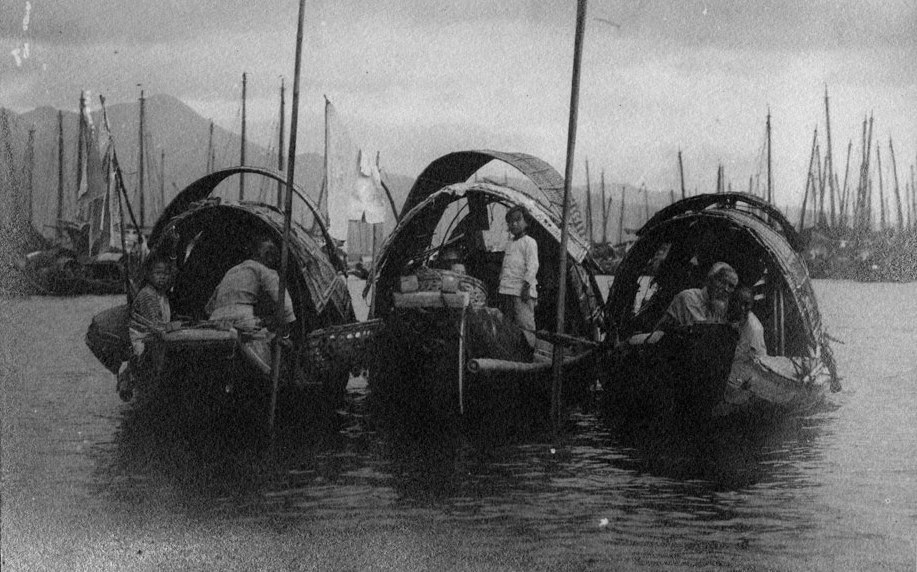
- Fuzhou Boat Dwellers on their boats in Min River, Fuzhou, Fujian, China, 1910.

Regions with significant populations
- The lower course of Min River and the coast of Fuzhou, Fujian Province in China

Languages
- Fuzhounese (native); Standard Chinese (second language)

Religion
- Roman Catholic, Taoism, Chinese Buddhism and Atheism

Related ethnic groups
- Fuzhou people and other Boat Dwellers

Fuzhou Boat Dwellers
- Chinese: 曲蹄
Transcriptions
Eastern Min
- Fuzhou BUC: Kuóh-dà̤

Mandarin name
- Chinese: 福州疍民
Transcriptions
Standard Mandarin
- Hanyu Pinyin: Fúzhōu dànmín
Eastern Min
- Fuzhou BUC: Hók-ciŭ Dáng-mìng

Alternative name
- Chinese: 江妹仔
Transcriptions
Eastern Min
- Fuzhou BUC: Gĕ̤ng-muói-giāng

Alternative name
- Chinese: 曲蹄婆
Transcriptions
Eastern Min
- Fuzhou BUC: Kuóh-dà̤-bò̤

The Fuzhou Boat Dwellers (Fuzhou dialect: 曲蹄; Kuóh-dà̤), or the Boat People, are a branch of the Boat Dwellers from Fujian, China. Derogatorily known as Tankas, they traditionally lived on sampans in the lower course of Min River and the coast of Fuzhou in Fujian Province most of their lives and have been officially recognized as Han Chinese since 1955.

== Origin and etymology ==
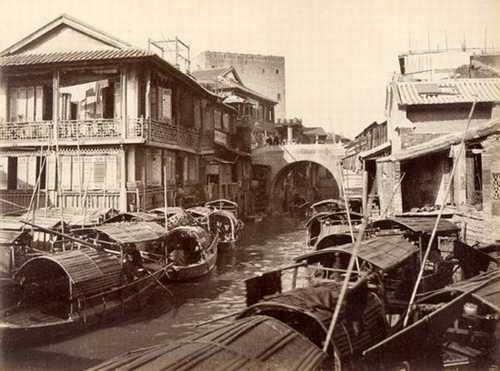
The boats of Fuzhou Boat Dwellers on an inner river in Fuzhou, circa late 19th to early 20th century.

There are several different views on the origin of Fuzhou Boat Dwellers. The mainstream theory believes that Fuzhou Boat Twellers are descendants of the Baiyue of ancient times. As a branch of the Boat Dwellers, Fuzhou Boat Dwellers have been in South China for more than 2000 years. Their Fuzhounese name "Kuóh-dà̤" (曲 蹄) is a derogatory term used by the Fuzhou people on land, which can be literally translated into "bowlegged" and might come from the bow shape of their legs caused by longtime living in the low cabins of their boats.

The Amoy University anthropologist Ling Hui-hsiang wrote on his theory of the Fujian Boat Dwellers being descendants of the Baiyue. He claimed that Guangdong and Fujian Boat Dwellers are definitely descended from the old Baiyue ('Pai Yueh') peoples and that they may have been ancestors of the Malay race.

== Language ==
Fuzhou Boat Dwellers now speak the Fuzhou dialect, which is widely used by the majority Fuzhou people in this region. Mandarin has also been brought to many of them through national compulsory education. However, they had their own language in history, but gradually abandoned it.

In Ming dynasty, many of them were already able to speak the Fuzhou dialect or other Eastern Min languages.

== Society ==
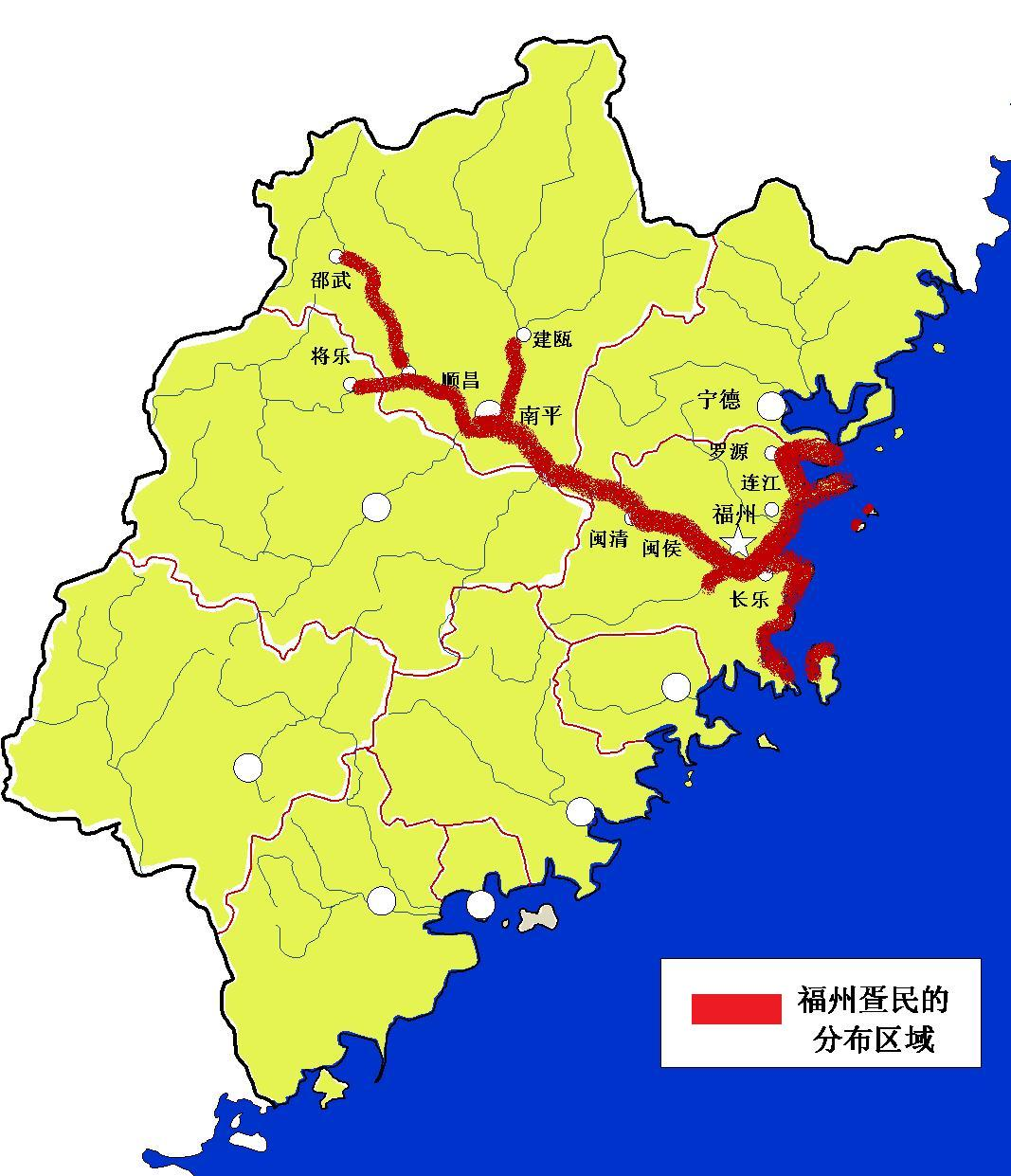
Distribution of the Fuzhou Boat Dwellers.

Traditionally, Fuzhou Boat Dwellers people lived on boats in most of their lives. They were severely discriminated by land-living Fuzhounese residents. Their life depended on fishing and ferrying, and most of them remained poor and uneducated. Fuzhou Boat Dwellers had a rich tradition of folk music, especially call and response. They also had different views on chastity and remarriage from the land-living Han Chinese. Pre-marital sex and remarriage were not restricted in their society. Due to the discriminatory policy imposed by the land-living Han majority, Fuzhou Boat Dwellers were forced to dress themselves in a humble way to show their inferiority to the land residents.

By the second half of the 19th century, many Boat Dwellers had already been converted to Roman Catholicism. Some of these Catholic Boat Dwellers consequently moved onto land under the protection of the Catholic Church.

In the Republican era, the ethnic egalitarianism was guaranteed by law. Since the 1950s, the city officials began to resettle Fuzhou Boat Dwellers to land dwellings. As a result, many Fuzhou Boat Dwellers villages were built along the Min River and the coast. Nowadays, most Fuzhou Boat Dwellers have abandoned their traditional waterborne lives and intermarriage is common. Their traditions, such as Fuzhou Boat Dweller folk music, are under threat as well.

== Discrimination against Fuzhou Boat Dwellers ==
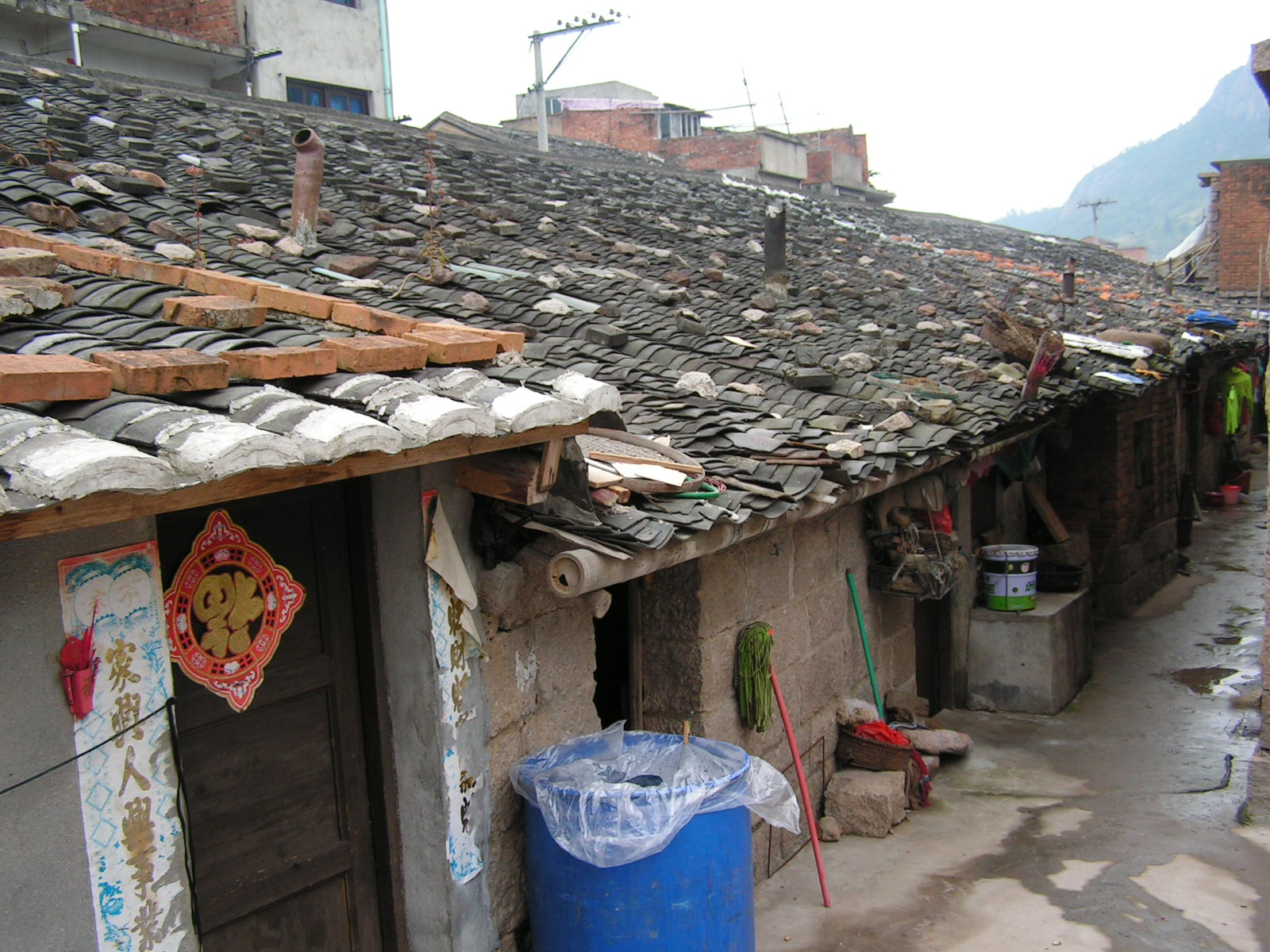
Boat Dweller land dwellings built in the mid-20th century in Luoyuan County, Fuzhou, China.

Before acceptance, the Fuzhou Boat Dwellers were generally considered by land Fuzhou residents as mean, unhygienic, ugly and inferior. They were not allowed to dwell on land, receive education, wear silk clothes or work in government or army. In some areas, they were even forbidden to walk on land; otherwise, they would be faced with death threats.

Since the 18th century, several attempts had been made to lift the discrimination against Boat Dwellers, but it was only in the People's Republic of China era that all the discriminatory policies were eliminated. Before the founding of the People's Republic of China, the 'gypsies of the sea' were not allowed to go ashore or marry the people living along the beach.

== Religion ==
Before the 19th century, many Fuzhou Boat Dwellers practiced Taoism, worshiping Mazu, Linshui and other gods and goddesses. In the late 19th century, many Fuzhou Goat Dwellers people converted to Roman Catholicism. Received, protected and assisted by the Roman Catholic Church in Fuzhou through Protectorate of missions, some of them were able to build simple land dwellings.

Currently, the majority of Fuzhou Boat Dwellers are Roman Catholic, which constitute a significant portion in Roman Catholic Archdiocese of Fuzhou.

== Surnames ==
The Fuzhou Boat Dwellers have different surnames than the Boat Dwellers of Guangdong.

Qing records indicate that "Weng, Ou, Chi, Pu, Jiang, and Hai" (翁, 歐, 池, 浦, 江) were surnames of the Fuzhou Boat Dwellers.

Qing records also stated that Boat Dweller surnames in Guangdong consisted of "Mai, Pu, Wu, Su, and He" (麥, 濮, 吴, 蘇, 何); alternatively, some people claimed Gu and Zeng (顧, 曾) as Boat Dweller surnames.
