= Maurice Freedman =

British anthropologist specialising in China

- Born: 11 December 1920; London, England, U.K.
- Died: 14 July 1975 (aged 54); London
- Resting place: Golders Green Cemetery
- Occupations: Academic; social anthropologist; Sinologist
- Title: Chair of Social Anthropology, University of Oxford
- Spouse: Judith Djamour (m. 1946)

Academic background
- Education: King's College London; London School of Economics and Political Science
- Influences: Sir Raymond Firth

Academic work
- Institutions: London School of Economics and Political Science; University of Oxford
- Main interests: Chinese society
- Military career
- Allegiance: United Kingdom
- Branch: Royal Artillery
- Service years: 1941–1945
- Rank: Second Lieutenant
- Service number: 1752949
- Conflicts: World War II

Maurice Freedman (11 December 1920 – 14 July 1975) was a British social anthropologist and Sinologist whose work focused on Chinese society, with particular attention to kinship, marriage, lineage organisation, and the study of Chinese religion. He studied anthropology at the London School of Economics and Political Science, began teaching there in 1951, and became Professor of Anthropology in 1965. In 1970 he was appointed to succeed E. E. Evans-Pritchard as Chair of Social Anthropology at the University of Oxford, where he became a Fellow of All Souls College.

== Early life and education ==
Freedman was born in London to a Jewish working-class family and studied English at the King's College. He served in the Royal Artillery between 1941 and 1945 during the Second World War, achieving the rank of Second Lieutenant.

After the war, Freedman entered the London School of Economics (LSE) as a graduate student in anthropology in 1946. His academic training took place within the tradition of British social anthropology and was shaped by contemporary debates about the relationship between anthropology and Sinology in the study of China. He was a student of eminent social anthropologist, Sir Raymond Firth.

== Academic career ==
Following fieldwork in Singapore, Freedman was appointed lecturer in anthropology at the London School of Economics in 1951. He was promoted to professor, succeeding Firth, in 1965 and remained closely associated with LSE for much of his academic career. During this period, he also held visiting appointments at institutions including the University of Malaya, Yale University, and Cornell University.

In 1970 Freedman moved to the University of Oxford, where he succeeded E. E. Evans-Pritchard as Professor of Social Anthropology and became a Fellow of All Souls College. He remained at Oxford until his death in London in July 1975 at the age of 54.

=== Research and scholarship ===
In January 1949, Freedman undertook two years of fieldwork among Chinese communities in Singapore. This research resulted in his monograph Chinese Family and Marriage in Singapore (1957). He also published a series of essays on Chinese religion and legal anthropology. These writings are described as demonstrating the value of studying overseas Chinese communities, while also formulating issues that later research in that area would continue to address.

In the early 1950s, Freedman developed a second line of work focused on “reconstructing” traditional Chinese society, especially institutions of kinship and marriage. With access to mainland China closed at the time, he used archives to study Chinese society indirectly. The resulting book, Lineage Organization in Southeastern China (1958), is characterised as a form of “armchair anthropology” based on documentary sources, and as a major point of reference for anthropological studies of China.

A third phase began with a 1963 field study in Hong Kong’s New Territories. According to the obituary, Freedman aimed to show what could be learned through observation in what he later called “residual China”, with particular reference to Hong Kong and Taiwan. The book Chinese Lineage and Society: Fukien and Kwangtung (1966) is presented as exemplifying an interplay between field research and sustained engagement with documentary and scholarly sources.

By the time of his death, Freedman was described as being well into a fourth phase of work, focused on the intellectual history of Sinological anthropology. In his Malinowski Memorial Lecture titled “A Chinese phase in social anthropology,” he examined work from the 1930s and 1940s and later extended this historical investigation back to 1870 through further archival research. Freedman suggested that China had become an important site for theoretical development within anthropology. This argument contributed to broader discussions about whether non-Western societies could serve as sources of general anthropological theory.

==== Studies of Chinese religion ====
In debates concerning the nature of Chinese religion, Freedman maintained that scholars should begin from the assumption that a coherent system of “Chinese religion” exists. He emphasised the ways in which ancestor worship, lineage organisation, and ritual practices were embedded within social structure and moral order.

This position was challenged by Arthur P. Wolf, who argued for the opposite assumption and emphasised the diversity and internal differentiation of Chinese religious practices, including distinctions among gods, ghosts, and ancestors. The exchange between Freedman and Wolf was cited in later scholarship as an example of contrasting approaches to the interpretation of Chinese religion, particularly regarding whether Chinese religious traditions should be understood as unified systems or as plural and locally differentiated practices. The Freedman–Wolf discussion was linked to broader methodological questions in the anthropology of China, including debates about unity and diversity in Chinese culture and the appropriate analytical scale for the study of religion.

== Selected published works ==
Freedman's major publications include:

- Chinese Family and Marriage in Singapore (1957)
- Lineage Organization in South-Eastern China (1958)
- Chinese Lineage and Society: Fukien and Kwangtung (1966)
- “A Chinese Phase in Social Anthropology” (1963)
- “On the sociological study of Chinese religion,” in Religion and Ritual in Chinese Society (ed. Arthur P. Wolf, 1974)

In 1959, Freedman co-founded the Jewish Journal of Sociology and served as the managing editor until his death.

== Personal life ==
In 1946 Freedman married Dr Judith Djamour (1921—2009), also a social anthropologist, who he met whilst studying at the London School of Economics. They did not have any children.

Academic offices
Preceded by Sir Raymond Firth	Professor of Social Anthropology, London School of Economics; 1965–1970	Succeeded by
Preceded by E. E. Evans-Pritchard	Chair of Social Anthropology, University of Oxford; 1970–1975	Succeeded by
