= Nisoish languages =

Sino-Tibetan language family

Nisoish
- Southeastern Loloish
- Geographic distribution: Southern China, Vietnam
- Ethnicity: Yi people, Phula people
- Linguistic classification: Sino-Tibetan: Lolo-Burmese; Loloish; Ni–Li–Kazhuoish; Nisoish
- Subdivisions: Northern Loloish (Nisoid); Southeastern Loloish (Axi-Puoid)

Language codes
- ISO 639-3: yso
- Glottolog: sout3212

The Nisoish or Yi languages, which contains both the Northern Loloish (Northern Ngwi) and Southeastern Loloish (Southeastern Ngwi) branches, are a branch of the Loloish languages proposed by Lama (2012). Northern Loloish and Southeastern Loloish were established by Bradley (1997), while the Nisoish group combining Bradley's two branches was proposed by Ziwo Lama (2012). Lama (2012) refers to Northern Loloish as Nisoid or Nisu–Lope, and Southeastern Loloish as Axi–Puoid.

== Classification history ==
In the past, Southeastern Loloish languages had variously been classified as Northern Loloish or Central Loloish, but were later recognized as forming a separate branch of Loloish by Bradley (2002). Jamin Pelkey (2011:368-371) also noted that Southeastern Loloish and Northern Loloish branches are likely to be sister branches with each other. Shortly later, Ziwo Lama's (2012) computational phylogenetic analysis of the Lolo-Burmese languages gave further support to Pelkey's hypothesis. Northern Loloish and Southeastern Loloish languages were also found to constitute a single branch in Satterthwaite-Phillips' (2011) computational phylogenetic analysis of the Lolo-Burmese languages, who considers Nasu, Nosu, Nisu, and Samei as belonging to the same branch.

== Languages ==
Lama (2012)'s Nisoish branch is contains two subgroups, namely Axi–Puoid (also known as Southeastern Loloish) and Nisoid (also known as Northern Loloish). Lama (2012) gives the following internal phylogeny for the Nisoish branch.

- Nisoish
  - Axi–Puoid
    - Puoid
      Zuoke, Pholo (≈ Phowa)
    - Axioid
      - Azha
      - Sani (–Samei), Azhe–Axi
  - Nisoid (Nisu–Lope)
    - - Lope (Awu)
      - - Nuosu (incl. Qumusu, Niesu)
        - Nasu (incl. Nesu, Gepo)
    - Nisu (Nishu)

Four of the six Yi languages (fangyan 方言) officially recognized by the Chinese government belong to Lama's Nisoish clade.

- Northern Yi (Nuosu 诺苏)
- Eastern Yi (Nasu 纳苏)
- Southern Yi (Nisu 尼苏)
- Southeastern Yi (Sani 撒尼)

However, the remaining two of the six officially recognized Yi languages belong to Lama's Lisoish clade.

- Western Yi (Lalo 腊罗)
- Central Yi (Lolopo 倮倮泼)

== Phonological innovations ==
Lama (2012) lists the following changes from Proto-Loloish as phonological innovations among various branches and languages of Nisoish.

- *NC- > NCʰ (Nasu and Gepu)
- *s- > ɕ- (Zuoke and Polo)
- *xl- > ɬ-, h- (Sani, Axi, Azhe, Azha)
- *plh- > tʰ- (Nisoid)
- *ŋg- > (n)dz-, dz- (Nisoid)

== Demographics and varieties ==
=== Wang (2003) ===
Yiyu Fangyan Bijiao Yanjiu (彝语方言比较研究) by Wang Chengyou (王成有) (2003) gives phonological inventories for Yi (Nisoish) languages spoken in the following locations.

1. Miyajing, Sanhe, Nanhua County 南华县三河底米丫井村
2. Zhuangke, Zhuangke, Yao'an County 姚安县庄科乡庄科村
3. Langzhe, Yunshan, Yongsheng County 永胜县云山乡朗者村
4. Lang'e, Lang'e, Yongsheng County 永胜县莨莪乡茛莪村
5. Zhijuxiao, Zhonghe, Yongren County 永仁县中和乡直苴小村
6. Hongmai, Lijiang 丽江红麦; Tanglang language 堂郎语
7. Huazhuqing, Xin'an, Mojiang County 思茅地区墨江县新安乡滑竹箐
8. Hemezha, Digengzuo, Buqi, Tanhua, Dayao County 大姚县昙华乡补期地耕作黑么鲊村
9. Aiguo, Yangjiang, Weishan County 巍山县漾江农场爱国村
10. Sanjia, Chongfeng, Weishan County 巍山县冲锋乡三家村
11. Lewuju, Wule, Nanjian County 南涧县五乐乡五具村
12. Yanzijiao, Guanting, Jingxing, Mojiang County 思茅地区墨江县景星乡官厅岩子脚村
13. Xiaoguangshan, Baoxiu, Shiping County 红河州石屏县宝秀乡小光山村
14. Zuoluo, Honghe County 红河州红河县座落村
15. Zhuyuan, Zhuyuan, Laochang District, Xinping County 新平县老厂区竹园乡竹园村
16. Suomili, Laowudou, Xinping County 新平县老五斗乡梭咪里村
17. Washaozong, Tadian, Eshan County 峨山县塔甸乡瓦哨宗村
18. Suxiong, Ganluo County 凉山州甘洛县苏雄乡
19. Laodashu, 2nd Township, Huili County 凉山州会理县第二乡老大树
20. Lizi, Hongma, Xide County 凉山州喜德县红玛乡李子村
21. Damaichong (upper village), Hejia, Liangshan, Yuanmou County 元谋县凉山乡何家村大麦冲上队
22. Daxingzhai, Wenshan County 文山县大兴寨; Zuoke language 坐柯
23. Huangzhai (small village), Gaodeng, Wenshan County 文山县高登乡村公所荒寨小队; Azhapu language 阿扎仆
24. Longshu, Qiubei County 丘北县龙树村; Axi Touruo language 阿细拖若
25. Anwang, Guangnan County 广南县安王村; Flowery Lolo 花倮
26. Long'an, Funing County 富宁县龙安; White Lolo 白倮
27. Musang, Funing County 富宁县木桑村; Black Lolo 黑倮
28. Sayingpan, Luquan, Kunming City 昆明市禄劝撒营盘
29. Banaji, Wuding County 武定县罢纳吉村
30. Chijiabi, Biji, Xishan, Kunming City 昆明市西山区碧鸡乡赤甲碧村
31. 2nd Village, Wafei, 5th District, Zhenxiong County 镇雄县五区娃飞乡二村
32. Laolin, Yanshan District, Zhaotong County 昭通县盐山区老林乡
33. Jingdi, Sayu, Zhaotong County 昭通县洒渔乡井底村
34. Longjie, 9th Township, Weining County 威宁县九乡龙街
35. Dafang County 大方县
36. Pan County 盘县
37. De'e, Longlin County 隆林县德峨
38. Axi 阿细: Xiaolongpu, Huakou, Xishan, Mile County 弥勒县西三镇花口村公所小龙铺村
39. Azhe 阿哲: Zhongzhai, Wushan, Mile County 弥勒县五山中寨村
40. Gupo 古泼: Songshulin, Niupo, Wushan, Mile County 弥勒县五山乡牛坡村公所松树林村
41. Sani 撒尼: Fengwu, Wujiepu, Luxi County 泸西县午街铺镇凤午村
42. Pula 濮拉: Wudupi, Chongmen, Mazheshao, Kaiyuan County 开远县马者哨乡冲门村委会乌都皮村
43. Nisu 尼苏: Baishengzhai (upper village), Baishengzhai, Yuanyang County 元阳县百胜寨乡百胜寨上村
44. Naisu 乃苏: Weisuo, Wushan, Mile County 弥勒县五山乡围锁村

=== YYFC (1983) ===
YYFC (1983) gives vocabulary lists for Yi (Nisoish) languages spoken in the following locations.

- Luquan (autonym: na̱³³so³³pʰo⁵⁵): in Tuanjie Township 团街公社
- Wuding (autonym: ʔᴀ⁵⁵lɑ̱³³pʰo⁵⁵): in Dongpo Township 东坡公社
- Xundian (autonym: ne⁵⁵su̱³³pʰo⁵⁵): in Jiga, Sishao Village, Jijie Township 鸡街公社四哨大队既嘎村
- Lunan (Heixi 黑夕) (autonym: ni⁵⁵sɛ²¹pʰu⁵⁵): in Miaozhuqing Township 亩竹箐公社
- Luoping (autonym: na⁵⁵sɯ²¹pʰo⁵⁵): in Fawan, Dashuijing Township 大水井公社法湾大队
- Weining (autonym: nɤ⁵⁵su¹³): in Shejigu, Longjie Township, District 9, Weining County, Guizhou 贵州威宁九区龙街公社奢基姑大队
- Kunming (autonym: ʂaŋ²¹ni⁵¹): in Puzhao Village, Ala Township, Guandu District 官渡区阿拉公社普照村
- Lunan (Sani 撒尼) (autonym: nɪ²¹): in Xuanzheng Village, Weize Township; and in Yehetaoshu Village, Xueshan Township 尾则公社宣政村、雪山公社野核桃树村
- Mile (Awu 阿乌) (autonym: lo²¹³pʰɯ²¹): in Jieyupo, Shemu Village, Dongshan Township 东山公社舍木大队捷雨坡村
- Mile (Axi 阿细) (autonym: ᴀ²¹ɕɪ⁵⁵pʰo²¹): in Youzhadi and Dapingdi villages, Gongyi Township 西一公社油乍地、大平地
- Mile (Azhe 阿哲) (autonym: ᴀ²¹dʐɛ²²pʰo²¹): in Zhongzhai Shengchan, Sijia Village, Wushan Township 五山公社四家大队中寨生产队
- Yanshan (autonym: pʰo⁵⁵lo⁵⁵): in Datiezhai, Changji Village, Ganhe Township 干河公社长吉大队大铁寨村
- Wenshan (autonym: dzω²¹kʰω³³): in Daxingzhai, Zhuilijie Township 追栗街公社大兴寨
- Funing (autonym: mo²¹ndʑi²¹): in Musang, Daping Village, Muyang Township 木央公社大坪大队木桑队
- Xinping (autonym: ȵe̱³³ʂu⁵⁵): in Zhuyuan, Zhuyuan Village, Laochang Township 老厂公社竹园大队竹园村
- Weishan (autonym: la²¹lu̪³³pa¹¹): in Wuying Township 武应公社[五印乡]
- Yangbi (autonym: lᴀ²¹lu⁵⁵po⁵⁵): in Yangbi County 漾濞县
- Yongren (autonym: lo³³lo³³pʰo²¹): in Zhiju, Zhonghe Township 中和公社直苴小村
- Yongsheng (Taliu 它六) (autonym: tʰɑ²¹lu̪⁵⁵): in Village 9, Liude Village, Liude Township, 六德公社六德大队九队
- Yongsheng (Lawu 拉务) (autonym: lᴀ²¹u²¹): in Wangjia, Maowu Shengchan Village, Lang'e Village, Xinghu Township 星湖公社莨莪大队茅五生产队王家村
- Lijiang (autonym: tʰo³³lo³³za³³): in Shuimao, Hongqi Village, Tai'an Township 太安公社红旗大队水茅村
- Yuanmou (autonym: niɛ³³su³³): in Upper Damaichong, Hejia Village, Liangshan Township 凉山公社何家村大队大麦冲上队
- Liangshan (autonym: nɔ³³su³³): in Yanyuan County, Sichuan 凉山州盐源县
- Honghe (autonym: ne³³ʂu⁵⁵pʰo²¹)
- Shiping (autonym: nie̱³³su⁵⁵pʰo²¹)
- Jiangcheng (autonym: ne̱³³su⁵⁵pʰo²¹)
- Eshan (autonym: nᴀ³³su⁵⁵pʰo²¹)
- Nanjian (autonym: la²¹lo³³pa²¹)

YYFC (1983) was subsequently republished as Zhang (2017).
