= Azha language =

Loloish language spoken in China

Azha
- Native to: China
- Native speakers: 53,000 (2007)
- Language family: Sino-Tibetan: Tibeto-Burman; Lolo-Burmese; Loloish; Southeastern; Sani–Azha; Azha

Language codes
- ISO 639-3: aza
- Glottolog: azha1235

Azha (Chinese: 阿扎语) is one of the Loloish languages spoken by the Yi people of China.

== Demographics ==
Azha (autonym: a33tsa21 or a55tʂa33) is spoken in Ganhe Township of Yanshan County, Yunnan and Dongshan and Binglie Townships of Wenshan County. Pelkey (2011) identifies the Azha 阿扎 (exonym: Pula 朴喇) of Kaiyuan, Yunnan as Phowa speakers.

Azha is spoken by the Phula people, but it is not a Phula language and is a Sani–Azha language, closely related to Sani, Axi and Azhe. Samei of Kunming may be related. Speakers are classified as Yi people by the Chinese Government.

== Innovations ==
In Azha, the words for 'goat', 'eat', and 'drink' are innovative (Pelkey 2011:377). Luojiayi Azha /mɛ33 xɛ33/ 'goat', /la̠45/ 'eat', /ŋɨ33/ 'drink' are not derived from Proto-Ngwi *(k)-cit^{L} 'goat', *dza² 'eat', and *m-daŋ¹ 'drink'.
