= Southeastern Loloish languages =

Sino-Tibetan language branch

Southeastern Loloish
- Southeastern Ngwi; Axi-Puoid
- Geographic distribution: Southern China, Vietnam
- Ethnicity: Yi people
- Linguistic classification: Sino-Tibetan: (Tibeto-Burman); Lolo–Burmese; Loloish; Nisoish; Southeastern Loloish

Language codes
- Glottolog: sout3212
- Phula is classified as Vulnerable by the UNESCO Atlas of the World's Languages in Danger

The Southeastern Loloish languages, also known as Southeastern Ngwi, are a branch of the Loloish languages. In Lama's (2012) classification, it is called Axi-Puoid, which forms the Nisoish branch together with the Nisoid (Nisu–Lope) (Northern Loloish) languages.

== Languages ==
Southeastern Yi is one of the six Yi languages (fangyan 方言) officially recognized by the Chinese government. Sani 撒尼 is the officially recognized literary standard for Southeastern Yi. Pelkey (2011) considers Southern Yi (Nisu 尼苏) to be another officially recognized Yi fangyan 方言 that belongs to Southeastern Loloish.

=== Pelkey (2011) ===
Jamin Pelkey (2011) lists the following languages in Southeastern Ngwi (Southeastern Loloish). Four branches of Southeastern Loloish are recognized, namely Nisu, Sani–Azha, Highland Phula, and Riverine Phula.

- Nisu: Nyisu?; Northern Nisu, Southern Nisu [+ Lope]
- Sani–Azha: Sani, Axi; Azhe; Azha [+ Samei?]
- Highland Phula:
  - Muji:
    - Core Muji: Northern Muji, Qila Muji, Southern Muji, Bokha–Phuma; Muzi; Laghuu
    - Thopho
    - Moji
  - Phowa:
    - Ani Phowa, Labo Phowa
    - Hlepho Phowa, Phukha
    - Khlula, Zokhuo
- Riverine Phula:
  - Upriver: Phola, Alo Phola, Phala
  - Downriver:
    - Phupa, Phuza
    - Phupha, Alugu

Pelkey (2011b) contains a comparative word list of Phola (Upriver Phula), Phuza (Downriver Phula), Muji (Highland Phula), Phowa (Highland Phula), and Azha.

Bradley (2007) had classified Sani, Axi, Azhe, and Azha as forming a Southeastern Central subgroup of Central Loloish, but Pelkey (2011) reclassified them as Southeastern Loloish rather than Central Loloish languages.

Also, Pelkey (2011) notes that Southeastern Ngwi may be most closely related to Northern Ngwi (including Nosu and Nasu), which is in line with Lama's (2012) proposal of a Nisoish clade.

==== Other languages ====
Pelkey (2011:353) specifically excludes Pholo, noting that although it has been closely associated with speakers of Southeastern Ngwi languages historically, it does not share the defining features of the branch.

Pelkey (2011) classifies Nyisu of Shilin County as belonging to the Nisu language cluster, but notes that this classification is in need of further formal evidence. Bradley (2007), however, classifies Nyisu of Kunming as being most closely related to Suondi Yi. It is not known whether Nyisu of Kunming and Nyisu of Shilin County are related or not.

Ethnologue classifies Ache as a Southeastern Loloish language. However, Ache has not been analyzed in classifications of Southeastern Loloish by Pelkey (2011) and Lama (2012), and hence remains unclassified within the Southeastern Loloish branch.

Pelkey (2011:431) suggests that the Xiqi, Ati, and Long languages of Huaning County may be Southeastern Loloish languages.

It is uncertain if Zhayipo 扎依颇 (dza21 ʑi21 pʰo21) of Mile County is a Southeastern Loloish language or not.

Glottolog and ISO 639 (2007) also add the "Nisi (China)" language (code: yso), previously named "Southeastern Lolo Yi", and still unclassified within branches of Southeastern Loloish.

== Innovations ==
Pelkey (2011:356-365) lists the following four mergers from Proto-Ngwi as Southeastern Ngwi innovations.

1. Proto-Ngwi *ʔ-k and *ʔ-ɡl > Proto-Southeastern Ngwi *tɬ (modern reflexes: tɬ, kɬ, k, t, ɬ, etc. in words such as to load)
2. Proto-Ngwi *pl/pj and *ʔ-kl > Proto-Southeastern Ngwi *tɬʰ (modern reflexes: tɬʰ, kɬʰ, kʰ, tʰ, ɬ, etc. in words such as bee, taro, destroy, change, excrement)
3. Proto-Ngwi *bl/bj and *ɡl > Proto-Southeastern Ngwi *dɮ (modern reflexes: dɮ, ɡɮ, ɡ, d, etc. in words such as silver, face, pus, full, to fly, lightning, four)
4. Proto-Ngwi *m-pl/m-plj and *m-bl/m-blj > Proto-Southeastern Ngwi *ndɮ (modern reflexes: ndɮ, ŋɡɮ, nd, etc.)

Another Southeastern Ngwi lexical innovation is that of ‘bat’, which is compounded from *b-yam¹ (‘to fly’) and *wa² (‘person’), literally meaning ‘flyer’ (Pelkey 2011:375).

=== Chen (1985) ===
Chen, et al. (1985) also recognizes a similar group called Southeastern Yi (彝语东南部方言), which includes the following dialects.

- Yiliang 宜良土语: spoken in Yiliang (including the Shilin border area), Qiubei, Luxi, Mile, and Luliang counties
- Mile 弥勒土语: spoken in Mile, Huaning, Kunming, Luxi, and Yiliang counties
- Huami 华弥土语 (Huaning-Mile): spoken in Mile, Huaning, and Jianshui counties
- Wenxi 文西土语 (Wenshan-Xichou): spoken in Wenshan, Xichou, Yanshan, Malipo, Maguan, Funing, Guangnan, and Qiubei counties. Internal variation is greatest within the Wenxi lect.

=== Chen (2010) ===
In Chen (2010), Southeastern Loloish called Nesu (聂苏方言). Also listed are the counties where each respective dialect is spoken.

- Nesu 聂苏方言
  - Nesu, Nièsū 聂苏次方言
    - Nesu, Nièsū 聂苏 (ne̠33su55): 500,000 speakers in Honghe, Mojiang, Yuanjiang, Yuanyang, Luchun, Jiangcheng, Jinping, Hekou, Pu'er, Jinghong, Mengla, etc.
    - Narsu, Nuósū 娜苏 (na33su55): 500,000 speakers in Shiping, Eshan, Tonghai, Jianshui, Kaiyuan, Gejiu, Mengzi, Pingbian, etc.
    - Zoko, Zuòkuò 作括 (dzo21kʰo44): 100,000 speakers in Wenshan, Yanshan, Xichou, Maguan, Malipo, etc.
  - Sani, Sǎní 撒尼次方言
    - Sani, Sǎní 撒尼 (nɪ21): 200,000 speakers in Lunan, Yiliang, Luliang, Mile, Luxi, Shizong, Malong, Luquan, Qiubei, etc.
    - Asi, Āxì 阿细 (a21ɕi55pʰo21): 200,000 speakers in Mile, Lunan, Chengjiang, Kunming, Huaning, etc.
    - Nise, Nísài 尼赛 (ni55sɛ21pʰu55): 100,000 speakers in Lunan
  - Azi, Āzhé 阿哲次方言
    - Azi, Āzhé 阿哲 (a21dʐɛ̠21pʰo21): 100,000 speakers in Mile, Huaning, Kaiyuan, Jianshui, etc.
    - Neshu, Nièshū 聂舒: (nɪ̠33ʂu55pʰo21): 500,000 speakers in Xinping, Yuxi, Jiangchuan, Yimen, Puning, etc.
    - Lopo, Luópō 罗泼 (lo21pʰɯ21): 100,000 speakers in Mile
    - Kopo, Gépō 格泼 (ko55pʰo21): 100,000 speakers in Fuyuan, Luoping, Zhanyi, Qujing, Shizong, Huize, Lunan, Luliang, Mile, etc.
    - Sanni, Sāngní 桑尼 (ʂɛ21ni51): 100,000 speakers in Kunming

== Demographics ==
The following demographics of Southeastern Loloish languages are from Pelkey (2011).

Demographics of Phula languages
| Language | Autonym(s) | Speakers | Ethnic population | Villages | Dialects | ISO-639 |
|---|---|---|---|---|---|---|
| Phala | pʰa31 la33/pʰa31 la55 | 12,000 | 13,000 | 33 | 5+ | ypa |
| Phola | pʰo31 la55 | 13,000 | 13,000 | 42 | 7+ | ypg |
| Alo Phola | pʰo31 la55 | 500 | 500 | 1 | 1 | ypo |
| Qila Muji | m̩13 dʑi33 | 1,500 | 1,500 | 3 | 3 | ymq |
| Southern Muji | m̩13 dʑi33 | 26,000 | 28,000 | 104 | 6+ | ymc |
| Northern Muji | mɯ21 dʑi33 | 9,000 | 15,000 | 61 | 3+ | ymx |
| Muzi | m̩13 dzɨ33 | 10,000 | 16,000 | 42 | 5+ | ymz |
| Bokha | po21 kʰo55 | 10,000 | 12,000 | 31 | 3+ | ybk |
| Phuma | pʰɯ55 ma21 | 8,000 | 8,000 | 23 | 2 | ypm |
| Alugu | a55 lɯ33 gɯ33 χa21 | 3,500 | 3,500 | 11 | 2 | aub |
| Phupa | pʰɯ33 pa21 | 3,000 | 4,000 | 13 | 3 | ypp |
| Phupha | pʰɯ55 pʰa33 | 1,300 | 1,500 | 5 | 3 | yph |
| Phuza | pʰɯ55 za31 | 6,000 | 8,000 | 28 | 2+ | ypz |
| Ani Phowa | pʰo21 va33 | 10,000 | 10,000 | 30 | 3+ | ypn |
| Labo Phowa | pʰo21 va33 | 17,000 | 21,000 | 70 | Dialect chain | ypb |
| Hlepho Phowa | pʰo21 va33 | 36,000 | 50,000 | 187 | Dialect chain | yhl |
| Azha | a33 tsa21, a55 tʂa33 | 53,000 | 54,000 | 98 | 5+ | aza |
| Zokhuo | tso21 kʰuo55 | 13,000 | 17,000 | 56 | 2 | yzk |
| Khlula | kɬʰu21 la33 | 21,000 | 34,000 | 114 | 3+ | ykl |
| Moji | – | 2,000 | 7,000 | 45 | 2+ | ymi |
| Phukha | – | 10,000 | 14,000 | 41? | Unknown | phh |
| Laghuu | la21 ɣɯ44 | 500 | 1,500 | 7 | Unknown | lgh |
| Pholo | pʰo55 lo55 | 30,000 | 34,000 | 112 | 3+ | yip |
| Thopho | tʰo21 pʰo33 | 200 | 500 | 2 | 1 | ytp |

The following datapoints (i.e., sample locations) for Phula languages are from Pelkey (2011:26-27).

Datapoints for Phula languages (Pelkey 2011)
| Language | County | Township | Village | Datapoint Code |
|---|---|---|---|---|
| Alugu | Gejiu | Manhao 蔓耗镇 | Chongtianling 冲天岭 | CTL |
| Azha | Yanshan County | Ganhe 干河彝族乡 | Faduke Dazhai 法都可大寨 ("Dafa 大法") | DFC |
| Azha | Wenshan County | Dongshan 东山彝族乡 | Huangzhai 荒寨 | HZC |
| Azha | Wenshan County | Binglie 秉烈彝族乡 | Luojiayi 倮家邑 | LJY |
| Azha | Wenshan County | Binglie 秉烈彝族乡 | Xiaopingba 小平坝 | XPB |
| Bokha | Pingbian County | Dishuiceng 滴水层乡 | Yibaizu 邑佰租 | YBZ |
| Bokho | Jinping County | Ma'andi 马鞍底乡 | Dixibei 地西北 | DXB |
| Khlula | Wenshan County | Liujing 柳井彝族乡 | Laozhai 老寨 | LZC |
| Khlula | Maguan County | Muchang 木厂镇 | Maxi 马西 | MXC |
| Muji | Pingbian County | Xinxian 新现乡 | Luoshuidong 落水洞 | LSD |
| Muji | Jinping County | Adibo 阿德博乡 | Pujiazhai 普家寨 | PJZ |
| Muji | Jinping County | Jinshuihe 金水河镇 | Qila 期腊 | QLC |
| Muji | Mengzi County | Shuitian 水田乡 | Xiepo 斜坡 | XPC |
| Muzi | Gejiu | Laochang 老厂镇 | Malutang 马鹿塘 | MLT |
| Muzi | Gejiu | Kafang 卡房镇 | Nuoguzhai 糯谷寨 | NGZ |
| Muzi | Jinping County | Tongchang 铜厂乡 | Shizitou 狮子头 | SZT |
| Phala | Honghe County | Baohua 宝华乡 | Beishe 碑赊 | BSC |
| Phala | Honghe County | Yisa 迤萨镇 | Feinishao 斐尼哨 | FNS |
| Phola | Honghe County | Menglong 勐龙傣族乡 | Adipo 阿底坡 | ADP |
| Phola | Yuanjiang County | Wadie 洼垤乡 | Luodie 罗垤 | LDC |
| Phola | Yuanjiang County | Lijiang 澧江镇 | Natang 那塘 | NTC |
| Phole | Wenshan County | Dehou 德厚镇 | Chekabai 扯卡白 | CKB |
| Pholo | Guangnan County | Wuzhu 五珠乡 | Fayi Xiazhai 法衣下寨 | FYX |
| Pholo | Yanshan County | Ganhe 干河彝族乡 | Shangxinzhai 上新寨 | SXZ |
| Pholo | Guangnan County | Zhulin 珠琳镇 | Xiji 西吉 | XJC |
| Phowa | Pingbian County | Xinhua 新华乡 | Feizuke 菲租克 | FZK |
| Phowa | Kaiyuan County | Beige 碑格乡 | Jiaji 架吉 | JJC |
| Phowa | Mengzi County | Mingjiu 鸣鹫镇 | Meizichong 梅子冲 | MZC |
| Phowa | Mengzi County | Beige 碑格乡 | Weibazhu Xiaozhai 尾巴猪小寨 | WBZ |
| Phowa | Kaiyuan County | Mazheshao 马者哨乡 | Wudupi 乌都皮 | WDP |
| Phowa | Mengzi County | Xibeile 西北勒乡 | Daheineng 大黑能 | DHN |
| Phowa | Kaiyuan County | Beige 碑格乡 | Lugumu 鲁姑母 | LGM |
| Phowa | Wenshan County | Baxin 坝心彝族乡 | Suozhiwan 所支弯 | SZW |
| Phowa | Mengzi County | Xibeile 西北勒乡 | Xibeile 西北勒 | XBL |
| Phuma | Pingbian County | Baihe 白河乡 | Yanzitou 岩子头 | YZT |
| Phupa | Mengzi County | Shuitian 水田乡 | Gamadi 嘎马底 | GMD |
| Phupha | Gejiu | Jiasha 贾沙乡 | Fengkou 风口 | FKC |
| Phuza | Mengzi County | Lengquan 冷泉镇 | Bujibai 补鸡白 | BJB |
| Thopho | Guangnan County | Zhetu 者兔乡 | Xinzhaicun 新寨村 | XZC |
| Zokhuo | Wenshan County | Zhuiligai 追栗街镇 | Daxingzhai 大兴寨 | DXZ |
| Moji | Xichou County | Lianhuatang 莲花塘乡 | Luchaichong 芦差冲 | LCC |

== Bibliography ==
- Bradley, David. 1997. "Tibeto-Burman languages and classification". In Tibeto-Burman languages of the Himalayas, Papers in South East Asian linguistics. Canberra: Pacific Linguistics.
- Bradley, David. 2002. The subgrouping of Tibeto-Burman. In Medieval Tibeto-Burman languages, Christopher Beckwith and Henk Blezer (eds.), 73–112. (International Association for Tibetan Studies Proceedings 9 (2000) and Brill Tibetan Studies Library 2.) Leiden: Brill.
- Bradley, David. 2007. East and Southeast Asia. In Moseley, Christopher (ed.), Encyclopedia of the World's Endangered Languages, 349-424. London & New York: Routledge.
- Chen Kang [陈康]. 2010. A study of Yi dialects [彝语方言研究]. Beijing: China Minzu University Press.
- Lama, Ziwo Qiu-Fuyuan. 2012. Subgrouping of Nisoic (Yi) Languages. Ph.D. thesis, University of Texas at Arlington.
- Pelkey, Jamin. 2011. Dialectology as Dialectic: Interpreting Phula Variation. Berlin: De Gruyter Mouton.
- van Driem, George. 2001. Languages of the Himalayas: An Ethnolinguistic Handbook of the Greater Himalayan Region. Leiden: Brill.
