= Pholo language =

Loloish language of Yunnan, China

Pholo
- Native to: China
- Ethnicity: Phula
- Native speakers: 30,000 (2011)
- Language family: Sino-Tibetan: Tibeto-Burman; Lolo-Burmese; Loloish; Nisoish; (unclassified); Pholo

Language codes
- ISO 639-3: yip
- Glottolog: phol1235

Pholo (autonym: pʰo55 lo55) is an unclassified Loloish language of Yunnan, China. Although culturally associated with the Phula languages, Pelkey (2011) does not consider it to be linguistically related to the Phula languages.

Pholo speakers are also referred to as Black Phula and Flowery Phula.

== Classification ==
Pelkey (2011:353) specifically excludes Pholo, noting that it does not share the defining features of Southeastern Loloish. However, Lama (2012) classifies Pholo as a Southeastern Loloish language, and considers it to be most closely related to Zokhuo

== Distribution ==
Pholo speakers are most densely concentrated in:

- Aji Township, Yanshan County
- eastern Tianxing Township, Qiubei County

Other Pholo speakers are found in:

- eastern Yanshan County
- Pingzhai Township, Qiubei County
- western Guangnan County
- Xinzhai Township, Malipo County

== Vocabulary ==
The following Pholo lexical items along with their Proto-Ngwi (Proto-Loloish) reconstructed proto-forms are from Pelkey (2011:390).

Gloss	Pholo	Proto-Ngwi
bee	bjɯ³³	*bya²
taro	bjɑ⁵³	*blum²
silver	pʰi³³	*plu¹
face	pʰjɔ⁵⁵	*pyu²
destroy	pe̠⁴⁵	*pyak^{H}
change	pʰjɑ̠⁴⁵	*C-plek^{L}
pus	ᵐbjɑ³³	*m-bliŋ¹
full	phɑ̠²¹	*m-bliŋ³
fly (v.)	bi⁵³	*b-yam¹
lightning		*b-lyap^{L}
release	pʰjɑ³³	*pyiŋ²
eagle	to³³	*ʔ-glaŋ²
stab		*m-gya²
excrement	tʰæ³³	*ʔ-kle²
load (v.)	ʦɯ⁵⁵	*ʔ-kun³/²

Most, but not all, of the Pholo words above do not share the following innovations that define Southeastern Ngwi.

1. Proto-Ngwi *ʔ-k and *ʔ-ɡl > Proto-Southeastern Ngwi *tɬ (modern reflexes: tɬ, kɬ, k, t, ɬ, etc.)
2. Proto-Ngwi *pl/j and *ʔ-kl > Proto-Southeastern Ngwi *tɬʰ (modern reflexes: tɬʰ, kɬʰ, kʰ, tʰ, ɬ, etc.)
3. Proto-Ngwi *bl/j and *ɡl > Proto-Southeastern Ngwi *dɮ (modern reflexes: dɮ, ɡɮ, ɡ, d, etc.)
4. Proto-Ngwi *m-pl/j and *m-bl/j > Proto-Southeastern Ngwi *ndɮ (modern reflexes: ndɮ, ŋɡɮ, nd, etc.)

Other Pholo words from Pelkey (2011:301):

- qɑ̠⁴⁵lɑ̠⁴⁵ (neck)
- ᵐbjɑ⁵⁵ʑɛ²¹ (pus)
- phɑ̠²¹ (full)
- χɑ⁵⁵ (long)
- mɑ⁵⁵ (name)
- mɑ̠⁴⁵ (cooked)

More Pholo words are documented in YYFC (1983), part of which are quoted in Lama (2012).
