= Muzi language =

Loloish language of Yunnan, China

Muzi
- Muji
- Native to: China
- Region: Yunnan
- Native speakers: 10,000 (2008)
- Language family: Sino-Tibetan: Lolo-Burmese; Loloish; Southeastern; Highland Phula; Muji languages; Core Muji; Muzi

Language codes
- ISO 639-3: ymz
- Glottolog: muzi1235
- ELP: Muzi

Muzi, or Muji, is a Loloish language spoken by the Phula people of China. It is one of several such languages to go by the name Muji.
