= Khlula language =

Loloish language of China

Khlula
- Native to: China
- Native speakers: 21,000 (2011)
- Language family: Sino-Tibetan: Lolo-Burmese; Loloish; Southeastern; Highland Phula; Phowa; Khlula–Zokhuo; Khlula

Language codes
- ISO 639-3: ykl
- Glottolog: khlu1236

Khlula is a Loloish language. It is spoken by the Phula people of China.

== Demographics ==
Khlula is spoken in southeast Wenshan County (in Liujing township), and north and central Maguan county (in Dalishu, Miechang, Muchang, and Renhe townships), Wenshan Prefecture, Yunnan, China.

Khlula is also known as Tula, Namupha, Alapha, Mo, Pao, Hei Phula, Black Phula, Shaoji Phula, Sifter basket Phula, Phulapha, Zokhuo Na, Black Zokhuo, or Khlula Yi. It is closely related to Zokhuo and this two languages form the Khlula-Zokhuo subgroup of the Phula languages which are part of the Southeastern Loloish languages which are a branch of the Loloish languages.

Khlula speakers are classified as Yi by the Chinese government. Khlula is known as 科鲁拉语 (Kēlǔlāyǔ) in Chinese.
