= Pholo =

Pholo may be,

- Pholo language
- Tsoanelo Pholo
- Mpho Pholo
