= Zhao Deguang =

Chinese politician

- 赵德光

Communist Party Secretary of Baoshan
- In office February 2016 – March 2021
- Preceded by: Li Zhengyang
- Succeeded by: Yang Jun

Mayor of Baoshan
- In office December 2015 – April 2016
- Preceded by: Wu Song
- Succeeded by: Yang Jun

Personal details
- Born: May 1962 (age 64) Shilin Yi Autonomous County, Yunnan, China
- Party: Chinese Communist Party (CCP)
- Education: Qujing Normal School; Yunnan Education College; Central Party School of the Chinese Communist Party

Chinese name
- Simplified Chinese: 赵德光
- Traditional Chinese: 趙德光
Transcriptions
Standard Mandarin
- Hanyu Pinyin: Zhào Déguāng

Zhao Deguang (Chinese: 赵德光; born May 1962) is a retired Chinese politician of Yi ethnicity who served as mayor of Baoshan from 2015 to 2016 and party secretary from 2016 to 2021.

He was a representative of the 19th National Congress of the Chinese Communist Party.

== Early life and education ==
Zhao was born in Shilin Yi Autonomous County, Yunnan, in May 1962. After resuming the college entrance examination, in 1980, he was accepted to Qujing Normal School. After graduating in 1982, he taught at Lunan County Minzu Middle School. In 1985, he entered Yunnan Education College, where he majored in Chinese language and literature. After graduation, he continued to teach at the school. He also studied at the Central Party School of the Chinese Communist Party from 1990 to 1992.

== Political career ==
Zhao was director of Lunan County Education Bureau in March 1993 and subsequently assistant secretary of the CCP Lunan County Committee in October 1997. In March 1998, he was transferred to his home-county Shilin Yi Autonomous County and appointed deputy party secretary. In April 2000, he was named acting magistrate of the county, confirmed in March 2001. He rose to become party secretary, the top political position in the county, in May 2004. He was appointed assistant mayor of Kunming in July 2004, concurrently serving as party secretary of Chenggong County.

He was appointed secretary of the Political and Legal Affairs Commission of the CCP Baoshan Municipal Committee in December 2010 and was admitted to member of the Standing Committee of the CCP Baoshan Municipal Committee, the prefecture-level city's top authority. He became mayor in December 2015, and then party secretary, the top political position in the city, beginning in February 2016.

In April 2021, he was chosen as a counsellor of Yunnan Provincial People's Government, a post he kept until September 2022.

== Downfall ==
On 9 September 2022, he was removed from public office and was placed on probation within the CCP for two years due to the pollution of East River in Baoshan.

Party political offices
Preceded by Wu Song	Mayor of Baoshan; 2015–2016	Succeeded by Yang Jun
Government offices
Preceded by Li Zhengyang	Communist Party Secretary of Baoshan; 2016–2021	Succeeded by Yang Jun
