= YMX =

YMX or ymx may refer to:

- Montréal–Mirabel International Airport, Quebec, Canada, IATA code YMX
- Northern Muji language, China, ISO 639-3 language code ymx
