= Phupha language =

Loloish languages of China

Phupha
- Phuza
- Native to: China
- Native speakers: 14,000 (2007)
- Language family: Sino-Tibetan: Lolo-Burmese; Loloish; Southeastern; Riverine Phula; Phupha

Language codes
- ISO 639-3: Variously: yph – Phupha aub – Alugu ypp – Phupa ypz – Phuza
- Glottolog: down1239

Phupha, or Downriver Phula, is a dialect cluster of Loloish languages spoken by the Phula people of China. There are four principal varieties, which may be considered distinct languages:

- Phupha, Alugu (Alugu Phupha)
- Phupa, Phuza

Usage is decreasing apart from Alugu, which is taught in primary schools.

The representative Phuza dialect studied in Pelkey (2011) is that of Bujibai (补鸡白), Lengquan Township (冷泉镇), Mengzi County.

== Demographics ==
The 4 dialects are spoken in the following locations:

- Phupa: southwest Mengzi county, southeast Lengquan and southeast Shuitian townships on southeast Gejiu panhandle.
- Phuza: southeast Gejiu county, southeast Kafang township; southwest Mengzi county, west Lengquan township.
- Phupha: southwest Gejiu county, 4 villages; Yuanyang county, 1 village across Honghe River.
- Alugu: Gejiu county, Manhao township; Yuanyang county, Fengchunling township across Honghe river.

Speakers are classified as Yi people.

== Works cited ==
- Pelkey, Jamin R. (2011). Dialectology as Dialectic: Interpreting Phula Variation. Berlin: De Gruyter Mouton. doi:10.1515/9783110245851. ISBN 978-3-11-024585-1.
