= YPG (disambiguation) =

YPG (Yekîneyên Parastina Gel) or People's Protection Units are the main armed service of the Kurdish Supreme Committee in Syria.

YPG or ypg may also refer to:

- Yellow Pages Group, a Canadian telephone-directory publisher
- Yuma Proving Ground, a U.S. Army facility in Arizona
- Portage la Prairie/Southport Airport's IATA code
- Phola language's ISO 639 code
