= Nyisu language =

Loloish language of Yunnan, China

Nyisu
- Yellow Yi
- Native to: China
- Region: Yunnan
- Ethnicity: Yi
- Native speakers: <300 (2005)
- Language family: Sino-Tibetan: (Tibeto-Burman); Lolo–Burmese; Loloish; Nisoish; Nyisu

Language codes
- ISO 639-3: –
- Glottolog: nyis1235

Nyisu or Yellow Yi 黄彝 is a Loloish language of Kunming, central Yunnan, China. There are fewer than 300 speakers remaining according to Bradley (2005, 2007). Nyisu speakers are also referred to as Doupo 都泼.

The Yellow Yi had originally migrated from Sichuan, and live in 4 villages in northwestern Fumin County (endangered) and one village in northwestern Anning, Yunnan (moribund, highly endangered). It is most closely related to Suondi Yi according to Bradley (2005). Nyisu (ȵi55 su33 pho21) was also documented by Lama (2012) in Luomian Township 罗免乡, Fumin County.

Pelkey (2011) tentatively classifies Nyisu of Shilin County as belonging to the Nisu language cluster. Nyisu (ȵi55 su33 pʰu55) of Gaohanshan Village, Zhuqing Township, Shilin County is documented in Wu Zili (1997) and YNYF (1984). It is not known whether Nyisu of Shilin and Nyisu of Kunming are closely related.

== Sources ==
- Bradley, David (2007). "East and Southeast Asia". In Moseley, Christopher (ed.). Encyclopedia of the World's Endangered Languages. London: Routledge. pp. 349–424.
- Lama, Ziwo Qiu-Fuyuan (2012). Subgrouping of Nisoic (Yi) Languages: A Study From the Perspectives of Shared Innovation and Phylogenetic Estimation (Ph.D. thesis). University of Texas at Arlington. hdl:10106/11161.
- Pelkey, Jamin (2011). Dialectology as Dialectic: Interpreting Phula Variation. Berlin: De Gruyter Mouton.
- Wu, Zili 武自立 (1997). "Nísū Yíyǔ sāibiān yīn zài fāngyán hé qīnshǔ yǔyán zhōng de duìyìng" 尼苏彝语塞边音在方言和亲属语言中的对应 [A Comparative Account of Lateral Stops in Nisu Yi and Other Closely Related Language Varieties]. Mínzú yǔwén (in Chinese). 1997 (3): 16–22.
- YNYF; Editorial Committee, eds. (1984). Yúnnán Yíyǔ fāngyán cíyǔ huìbiān 云南彝语方言词语汇编 [A Lexical Compendium of Yi Dialects] (in Chinese). Kunming: Yunnan minzu xueyuan.
