= YTP =

YTP may refer to:

- YouTube Poop, a type of video mashup
- New Turkey Party (1961) (Turkish: Yeni Türkiye Partisi or YTP), a defunct political party founded in 1961
- New Turkey Party (2002) (Turkish: Yeni Türkiye Partisi or YTP), a defunct party founded in 2002
- New Turkey Party (current) (Turkish: Yeni Türkiye Partisi or YTP), a party founded in 2013
- ISO 639:ytp, code for the Thopho language
- Yield to put (YTP), a variant of yield to maturity of fixed-interest securities
- YTP, IATA code for the Tofino Harbour Water Aerodrome in British Columbia, Canada
