= PHH (disambiguation) =

PHH may refer to:

- PHH Corporation, an American financial services corporation
- phh, the ISO 639-3 code for Phukha language
- Phan Thiet Airport, the IATA code PHH
- Benzene, sometimes denoted as PhH
- Peter H. Haynes, a British applied mathematician
