= YBK =

YBK or ybk may refer to:

- Baker Lake Airport, Nunavut, Canada, IATA airport code YBK
- Bokha language, China, ISO 639-3 language code ybk
