= Thopho language =

Endangered Loloish language of Yunnan, China

Thopho
- Native to: China
- Region: Yunnan
- Native speakers: 200 (2011)
- Language family: Sino-Tibetan: Lolo-Burmese; Loloish; Southeastern; Highland Phula; Muji languages; Thopho

Language codes
- ISO 639-3: ytp
- Glottolog: thop1236

Thopho, or Black Phula, is an endangered Loloish language spoken by the Phula people of Yunnan, China. There are 200 speakers out of an ethnic population of 500 speakers. It is spoken in the following two villages in eastern Guangnan County, Yunnan.

- Bacai 坝彩, Zhongzhai Village 中寨村, Zhulin Township 珠琳镇
- Xinzhai 新寨, Zhema Village 者妈村, Zhetu Township 者兔乡 (living alongside Zhuang speakers)
