= YSN =

YSN or ysn may refer to:

- Yale School of Nursing, a nursing school in Connecticut, United States
- YSN, the IATA code for Salmon Arm Airport, British Columbia, Canada
- ysn, the ISO 639-3 code for Sani language, China
