= YPB =

YPB or ypb may refer to:

- Port Alberni (Alberni Valley Regional) Airport, British Columbia, Canada, IATA airport code YPB
- Labo Phowa language, in China, ISO 639-3 code ypb
