= YIF =

YIF or yif may refer to:

- Saint-Augustin Airport, in Quebec, Canada, IATA code YIF
- Ache Yi language, in China, ISO 639-3 language code yif
