= Moji language =

Language

Moji
- Muji
- Flathead Phula
- Native to: China
- Region: Yunnan
- Native speakers: 2,000 (2011)
- Language family: Sino-Tibetan: Lolo-Burmese; Loloish; Southeastern; Highland Phula; Muji languages; Moji

Language codes
- ISO 639-3: ymi
- Glottolog: moji1238
- ELP: Moji

Moji, or Muji, also known as Pingtou (Flathead) Phula, is a Loloish language spoken by the Phula people of China. It is one of several such languages to go by the name Muji.

== Distribution ==
Moji is spoken in the following Counties of Yunnan:

- South and southwest Wenshan County
- West Xichou County (in Luchaichong village)
- Possibly east Fumin County
