= YMI =

YMI may refer to:

- Yeh Mera India, 2008 movie
- Young Men's Institute, Catholic organization
- Young Men's Institute Building in Asheville, North Carolina, United States
- YMI Jeans, American company
- Yamaha Motor India
- ymi, ISO 639-3 code for the Moji language
- Y's Men International, founded in 1922
