= Ache Yi language =

Sino-Tibetan language spoken in China

Ache
- Native to: China
- Ethnicity: Yi
- Native speakers: 35,000 (2003)
- Language family: Sino-Tibetan: (Tibeto-Burman); Lolo–Burmese; Loloish; Nisoish; Southeastern Loloish?; Ache

Language codes
- ISO 639-3: yif
- Glottolog: ache1244

Ache (Chinese: 阿车) is a Loloish language spoken by the Yi people of south-central Yunnan, China. Ethnologue lists Azhe as an alternate name.

== Demographics ==
Ache is spoken in Shuangbai County (pop. 23,000), Yimen County (pop. 11,100), Eshan County, and Lufeng County. Yunnan (1955) reports that their autonym in Xinping County is nei33 su33 pʰɯ21.

== Classification ==
Ethnologue classifies Ache as a Southeastern Loloish language, and lists 35,000 speakers as of 2003. Ache has not been analyzed in classifications of Southeastern Loloish by Pelkey (2011) and Lama (2012), and hence remains unclassified within the Loloish branch.
