= Kaiyuan, Yunnan =

Kaiyuan 开远市
- County-level city
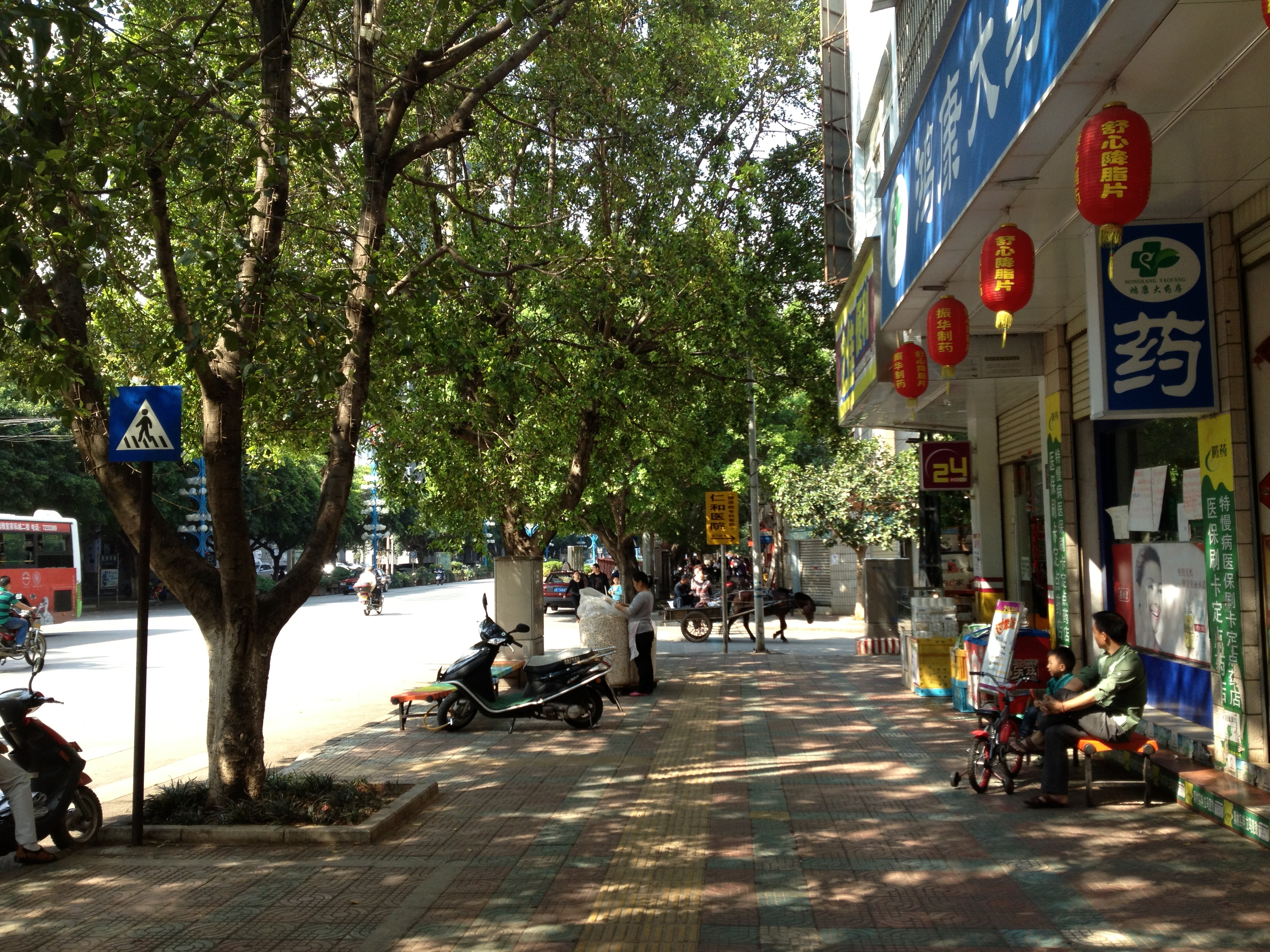
- A street in central Kaiyuan

- Location of Kaiyuan City in Honghe Prefecture within Yunnan province

- Location in Yunnan
- Coordinates: 23°42′40″N 103°14′46″E
- Country: People's Republic of China
- Province: Yunnan
- Prefecture: Honghe

Area
  - Total: 1,946.51 km^{2} (751.55 sq mi)

Population
  - Total: 299,000
  - Density: 154/km^{2} (398/sq mi)
- Postal code: 661600
- Area code: 0873
- Website: www.hhky.gov.cn

Kaiyuan (simplified Chinese: 开远; traditional Chinese: 開遠; pinyin: Kāiyuǎn) is a county-level city within the jurisdiction of Honghe Hani and Yi Autonomous Prefecture in the southeast of Yunnan province, China.

== Geography ==
The maximum sea level of Kaiyuan is 2,775.6 meters and the minimum is 950 meters. It borders Mile City to the north, Qiubei County and Yanshan County, Yunnan to the east, Mengzi City and Gejiu to the south, and Jianshui County to the west.

== Administrative divisions ==
At present, Kaiyuan City has 2 subdistricts, 2 towns, 2 townships and 1 ethnic township.

2 subdistricts

- Lebaidao (乐白道街道)
- Lingquan (灵泉街道)

2 towns

- Zhongheying (中和营镇)
- Xiaolongtan (小龙潭镇)

2 townships

- Yangjie (羊街乡)
- Beige (碑格乡)

1 ethnic township

- Dazhuang Hui (大庄回族乡)

== Demography ==
It has a population of 299,000, of whom 156,000 belong to ethnic minorities, including Yi, Zhuang, Miao, and Hui.

== Ethnic groups ==
The Kaiyuan City Almanac (1996:618) lists the following ethnic Yi subgroups.

- Gaisu 改苏 (autonyms: Gaisupo 改苏泼, Luoluopo 倮倮泼; exonyms: Luoluo 倮倮); ancestors migrated from Luxi 泸西 and Mile 弥勒
  - Mazheshao Township 马者哨: Sanjia 三家
  - Dazhuang Township 大庄: in Taoshu 桃树 and Longtan 龙潭
  - Yangjie Township 羊街: in Hongtu 红土, Gucheng 古城, Wolonggu 卧龙谷
- Azha 阿扎 (exonym: Pula 朴喇); ancestors are from Kunming.
  - Daizhanpo 呆占泼: in Beige 碑格, Xiaozhao 小寨, Xiamizhe 下米者, Jiaji 架吉, etc. of Beige Township 砷格乡
  - Anipo 阿尼泼: in Zongshe 宗舍, Masangqing 马桑箐, and Qibudi 期不底, etc. of Yangjie Township 羊街乡
  - Labapo 腊拨泼: in Jiagu 架古, Xieshimu 螯始母, and Luopodong 落坡洞 of Beige Township 碑格乡; Laozhai 老寨 of Dazhuang Township 大庄乡, etc.
  - Axiheipo 阿洒黑泼: in Jiufang 酒房 and Hongshiyan 红石岩 of Lebaidao 乐白道; Chongmen 冲门 of Mazheshao Township 马者哨乡, etc.
  - Digaopo 底高泼: in Dapingzhai 大平寨, Bajiazhai 八家寨, and Miduo 米朵 of Zhongheying Township 中和营乡; Hulutang 葫芦塘 of Mazheshao Township 马者哨乡; Adeyi 阿德邑 of Lebaidao 乐白道; Taoshu 桃树 of Dazhuang Township 大庄乡, etc.
- Azhe 阿哲: in Jiedian 楷甸 of Lebaidao Township 乐白道; and Chongzi 冲子 of Mazheshao Township 马者哨

Daizhanpo 呆占泼 and Digaopo 底高泼 are identified by Pelkey (2011) as Helpho Phowa speakers. Labopho means ‘Highland Pho’, and Digaopho means ‘Lowland Pho’. Pelkey (2011:110) identifies Phowa subgroups as Helpho (ɬɛ˧ pʰo˨˩), Anipho (a˧nɨ˥ pʰo˨˩), Digaopho (ti˨˩kaʌ˥ pʰo˨˩), Labopho (lɑ˨˩bo˨˩ pʰo˨˩), and Asaheipho (a˧sa˧χɨ˥ pʰo˨˩).

== Culture ==
Kaiyuan is thought highly of in the field of traditional martial arts, and held the first Chinese Traditional Martial Arts Festival in 2006.

== Economy ==
Kaiyuan is a long-established industrial city, which has been paying much attention to its environment problems. Its aim is "to construct an affluent city with an ecological industrial base". Kaiyuan is also home to the Yunnan Academy of Agricultural Sciences.

With the approval of the central government, Yunnan has established an experimental zone for private small businesses at Kaiyuan.

== Climate ==
Climate data for Kaiyuan, elevation 1,196 m (3,924 ft), (1991–2020 normals, extremes 1981–present)
Month	Jan	Feb	Mar	Apr	May	Jun	Jul	Aug	Sep	Oct	Nov	Dec	Year
Record high °C (°F)	30.2 (86.4)	32.0 (89.6)	34.2 (93.6)	36.5 (97.7)	37.3 (99.1)	36.0 (96.8)	35.6 (96.1)	35.2 (95.4)	35.8 (96.4)	33.6 (92.5)	32.2 (90.0)	29.4 (84.9)	37.3 (99.1)
Mean daily maximum °C (°F)	21.0 (69.8)	23.6 (74.5)	27.2 (81.0)	29.8 (85.6)	30.0 (86.0)	30.1 (86.2)	29.7 (85.5)	29.8 (85.6)	28.8 (83.8)	26.3 (79.3)	23.7 (74.7)	21.0 (69.8)	26.8 (80.1)
Daily mean °C (°F)	13.5 (56.3)	15.7 (60.3)	19.3 (66.7)	22.6 (72.7)	24.0 (75.2)	24.9 (76.8)	24.6 (76.3)	24.2 (75.6)	23.0 (73.4)	20.6 (69.1)	16.7 (62.1)	13.9 (57.0)	20.2 (68.5)
Mean daily minimum °C (°F)	8.4 (47.1)	10.0 (50.0)	13.6 (56.5)	17.0 (62.6)	19.4 (66.9)	21.2 (70.2)	21.2 (70.2)	20.6 (69.1)	19.1 (66.4)	16.8 (62.2)	12.1 (53.8)	9.2 (48.6)	15.7 (60.3)
Record low °C (°F)	0.5 (32.9)	2.7 (36.9)	1.7 (35.1)	7.6 (45.7)	10.4 (50.7)	14.6 (58.3)	15.9 (60.6)	15.3 (59.5)	9.8 (49.6)	5.7 (42.3)	2.2 (36.0)	−2.7 (27.1)	−2.7 (27.1)
Average precipitation mm (inches)	25.4 (1.00)	15.1 (0.59)	24.0 (0.94)	43.0 (1.69)	79.0 (3.11)	119.1 (4.69)	132.9 (5.23)	128.5 (5.06)	82.7 (3.26)	56.2 (2.21)	31.5 (1.24)	17.9 (0.70)	755.3 (29.72)
Average precipitation days (≥ 0.1 mm)	4.5	4.0	4.9	8.4	11.8	14.1	18.2	16.8	10.8	9.2	5.1	3.4	111.2
Average snowy days	0.1	0	0	0	0	0	0	0	0	0	0	0	0.1
Average relative humidity (%)	68	62	58	59	64	71	77	78	75	74	73	72	69
Mean monthly sunshine hours	184.6	193.2	214.6	223.9	213.1	147.0	134.3	148.3	147.9	138.1	166.7	165.3	2,077
Percentage possible sunshine	55	60	57	59	52	36	32	37	41	39	51	50	47
Source: China Meteorological Administrationall-time October recordall-time November record high
