= Phukha language =

Loloish language of Vietnam and China

Phukha
- Phula
- Native to: China, Vietnam
- Ethnicity: 18,000 Phula people (undated – 2009)
- Native speakers: 100,000 (2008–2011)
- Language family: Sino-Tibetan: Lolo-Burmese; Loloish; Southeastern; Highland Phula; Phowa; Hlepho–Phukha; Phukha

Language codes
- ISO 639-3: phh
- Glottolog: phuk1235
- ELP: Phula

Phukha is a Loloish language spoken by the Phula people of Vietnam and Southern China.

== Distribution ==
Phukha is spoken near Lao Cai town; Xin Mun District of Ha Giang Province and Lai Chau and Son La Provinces in Vietnam and villages in Maguan, Malipo and Hekou Counties in China. Phula people in Yen Bai Province do not speak Phukha but speak Laghuu.

== Phonology ==
=== Consonants ===
Phukha has the following consonants.

		Labial	Coronal			Retroflex	Palatal	Velar	Uvular
		Labial	Plain	Lateral	Sibilant	Retroflex	Palatal	Velar	Uvular
Plosive/ Affricate	Aspirated	pʰ	tʰ	tɬʰ	tsʰ	tʂʰ	tʃʰ	kʰ	
Plosive/ Affricate	Voiceless	p	t	tɬ	ts	tʂ	tʃ	k	
Plosive/ Affricate	Voiced	b	d	dɮ				ɡ	
Fricative	Voiceless	f	s	ɬ		ʂ	ʃ		χ
Fricative	Voiced	v	z	ɮ		ʐ	ʒ		ʁ
Fricative	Laryngealized	v̰	z̰				ʒ̰		
Nasal		m	n					ŋ	
Approximant		w		l			j		

=== Vowels ===
Phukha has the following vowels.

	front	central	back	
	front	central	unrounded	rounded
High	i	ɨ	ɯ	u
High-mid	e	ə		o
Low-mid	ɛ		ʌ	ɔ
Low		a		

=== Tones ===
Phukha has five tones: high /˥/ (/55/), mid /˧/ (/33/), low /˨/ (/22/), low-rising /˨˦/ (/24/), and low-falling /˨˩/ (/21/).
