= Phola language =

Loloish dialect cluster of China

Phola
- Pula
- Native to: China
- Native speakers: 25,000 (2011)
- Language family: Sino-Tibetan: Lolo-Burmese; Loloish; Southeastern; Riverine Phula; Phola

Language codes
- ISO 639-3: Variously: ypg – Phola ypa – Phala ypo – Alo Phola
- Glottolog: upri1239

Phola, or Upriver Phula, is a dialect cluster of the Loloish languages spoken by the Phù Lá people of China.

Phola proper is spoken by 13,000 people in Honghe County, Gejiu, Shiping County, Jianshui County and Yuanjiang County.

Alo Phola is spoken by 500 people in the village of Tuguozhai (土锅寨), Dashuiping Community (大水平村), Lijiang Township (澧江镇), Yuanjiang County, Yunnan, where they are surrounded by Dai speakers.

Phala is spoken by 12,000 people out of an ethnic population of 13,000 in Honghe, Shiping, Jianshui and Yuanyang Counties.

The representative Phola dialect studied in Pelkey (2011) is that of Luodie (罗垤), Wadie Township (洼垤乡), Yuanjiang County.
