= Zokhuo language =

Loloish language spoken by the Phula people of China

Zokhuo
- Native to: China, Vietnam
- Region: Yunnan
- Ethnicity: 17,000 (2011?)
- Native speakers: 13,000 in China (2011)
- Language family: Sino-Tibetan: Tibeto-Burman; Lolo-Burmese; Loloish; Southeastern; Highland Phula; Phowa; Khlula–Zokhuo; Zokhuo

Language codes
- ISO 639-3: yzk
- Linguist List: qbf Chökö
- Glottolog: zokh1238

Zokhuo (autonym: dzu21 kʰʊ33), also known as Niuweiba (Cowtail) Phula, is a Loloish language spoken by the Phula people of China. It appears to be the Chökö (Tśökö) of Vietnam.

== Demographics ==
In China, Zokhuo speakers are found in Yunnan province: southeast Wenshan County, south Dongshan and north Zhuiligai townships; south Yanshan County, Yunnan. Speakers are classified as Yi people. According to linguist Jamin Pelkey, Zokhuo is endangered and at risk of becoming moribund.

== Works cited ==
- Pelkey, Jamin R. (2011). Dialectology as Dialectic: Interpreting Phula Variation. Berlin: De Gruyter Mouton. doi:10.1515/9783110245851. ISBN 978-3-11-024585-1.
