= Sani language =

Loloish language spoken in China

Sani
- nɪ˨˩ do˨˩
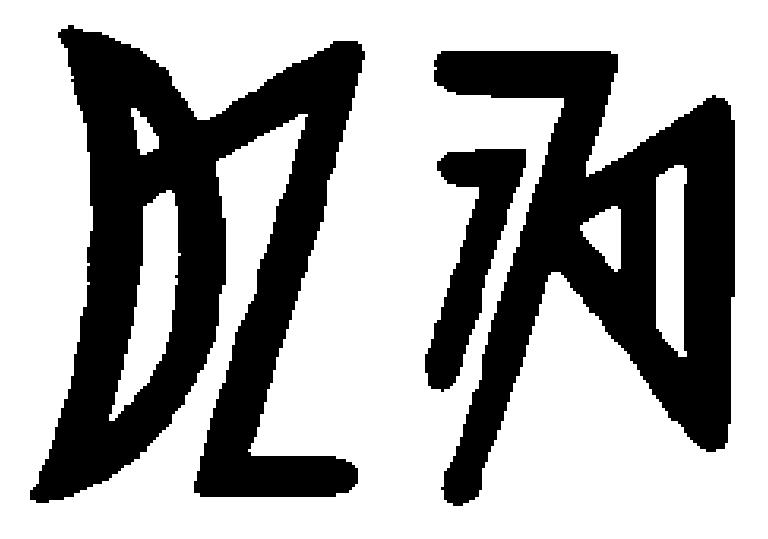
- Sani written in Yi script
- Native to: China
- Ethnicity: Yi
- Native speakers: 100,000 (2007)
- Language family: Sino-Tibetan: Tibeto-Burman; Lolo-Burmese; Loloish; Southeastern; Sani–Azha; Sani
- Writing system: Yi script

Language codes
- ISO 639-3: ysn
- Glottolog: sani1269

Sani (Chinese: 撒尼; pinyin: Sani) is one of the Loloish languages spoken by the Yi people of China. It is one of six Yi languages recognized by the Chinese government, under the name Southeastern Yi. Sani is spoken in Shilin, Luliang, Luxi, Shizong, Yiliang, Malong, Luquan, and Mile counties by about 120,000 speakers.

The Sani [sa˨˩ni˨˩] call themselves [ni21]. Their language is distinct from the closely related Samei, whose speakers call themselves Sani [sa21 ni53].

Another group known as the Sa 撒 (autonym: Sani 撒尼) lives in Qiubei County (Yunnan 1960). Yunnan (1960) considers it to be similar to Sani of Shilin County. The ethnic population consisted of 1,443 as of 1960.

== Innovations ==
Pelkey (2011:378) defines two innovations that Sani and Axi both share with each other.

1. Exclusive devoicing of tone category 1 proto-voiced initials (even if there is voiced retention in tone category 2). These words include 'fly (v.)', 'wing', 'bridge', and 'liquor'.
2. Dominant -e/-ɛ reflexes of *-ak rhymes.
