= Laghuu language =

Loloish language spoken in Vietnam

Laghuu
- Native to: Vietnam
- Native speakers: 300 (2002)
- Language family: Sino-Tibetan: Lolo-Burmese; Loloish; Southeastern; Highland Phula; Muji; Laghuu

Language codes
- ISO 639-3: lgh
- Glottolog: lagh1245
- ELP: Laghuu

Laghuu (Vietnamese: Xá Phó, Phù Lá Lão) is a Loloish language spoken in northwestern Vietnam. In Nậm Sài, Sa Pa Town, the speakers' autonym is la21 ɣɯ44, while in Sơn La Province it is la21 ɔ44. The people are also called the Phù Lá Lão by the Vietnamese.

Edmondson considers Laghuu to be related to but not part of the Yi language complex of China. Jamin Pelkey (2011) considers Laghuu to be a Southeastern Loloish language.

== Distribution ==
Laghuu is spoken in the following locations by a total of about 1,000 people (Edmondson 1999 & 2002).

- Lào Cai province
  - Văn Bàn district
  - Bảo Thắng district
  - Bát Xát district
    - A Lù
  - Sa Pa town
    - Nậm Sài
  - Cam Đường (near Lào Cai city)
- Yên Bái province
  - Văn Yên district
- Sơn La province
  - Thuần Giáo

The Vietnam, Laghuu speakers are officially classified as part of the Phù Lá ethnic group. Some Laghuu are known as "Black Phu La," and others as "Flowery Phu La."

== Phonology ==
=== Phonotactics ===
Words in Laghuu are typically disyllabic compounds, consisting of two single-syllable morphemes, as in other Yi languages. A syllable may be divided into an initial, a rhyme, and a tone. The initial is not obligatory, and it usually consists of a single consonant, though it may also be a cluster consisting of a velar stop followed by a lateral. The rhyme consists of a nuclear vowel followed by a glide /-i, -u/ or a nasal coda /-m, -n, -ŋ/, with /ŋ/ being the most common coda nasal.

=== Consonants ===
Laghuu has the following consonants. In addition to these single consonants, Laghuu also allows syllables to begin with velar stop + alveolar lateral sequences: /kl, khɬ, gl, ŋkhɬ/.

		Labial	Alveolar	Post- alveolar	Velar	Glottal
Nasal		m	n		ŋ	
Plosive and Affricate	prenasalized	ᵐb	ⁿd		ᵑɡ	
Plosive and Affricate	aspirated	pʰ	tʰ	tʃʰ	kʰ	
Plosive and Affricate	tenuis	p	t	tʃ	k	ʔ
Plosive and Affricate	voiced	b	d		ɡ	
Fricative	voiceless	f	s	ʃ	x	h
Fricative	voiced	v	z	ʒ	ɣ	
Approximant			l			

=== Vowels ===
Laghuu has the following vowels. Also, the diphthongs /ai/, /au/, /ɯi/ occur.

	front	central	back	
	front	central	unrounded	rounded
High	i	ɿ	ɯ	u
Hi-mid		ə		o
Lo-mid	ɛ			ɔ
Low			a	

=== Tones ===
Laghuu has five tones:

- high /˥/ (/55/)
- high-mid /˦/ (/44/)
- low-mid /˧/ (/33/)
- low-rising /˨˦/ (/24/)
- low-falling /˨˩/ (/21/)
