= Samei language =

Loloish language spoken in China

Samei
- Native to: China
- Ethnicity: Yi
- Native speakers: 20,000 (2007)
- Language family: Sino-Tibetan: Tibeto-Burman; Lolo-Burmese; Loloish; Southeastern; Sani–Azha; Samei

Language codes
- ISO 639-3: smh
- Glottolog: same1240
- ELP: Samei

Samei (autonym: sa21 ni53) is a Loloish language of Yunnan, China closely related to Sani. It is spoken in 47 villages in and around Ala Township 阿拉彝族乡, located in eastern Guandu District just southeast of downtown Kunming, as well as in 7 villages in western Yiliang County (Ethnologue). There are about 20,000 speakers out of an estimated 28,000 ethnic population.

== Documentation ==
Ye (2020) contains a detailed description and 3,000-word list of Samei.

Samei lexical data is also documented in Satterthwaite-Phillips (2011).
