= Qiubei County =

Qiubei County 丘北县 · Ciuhbwz Yen
- County
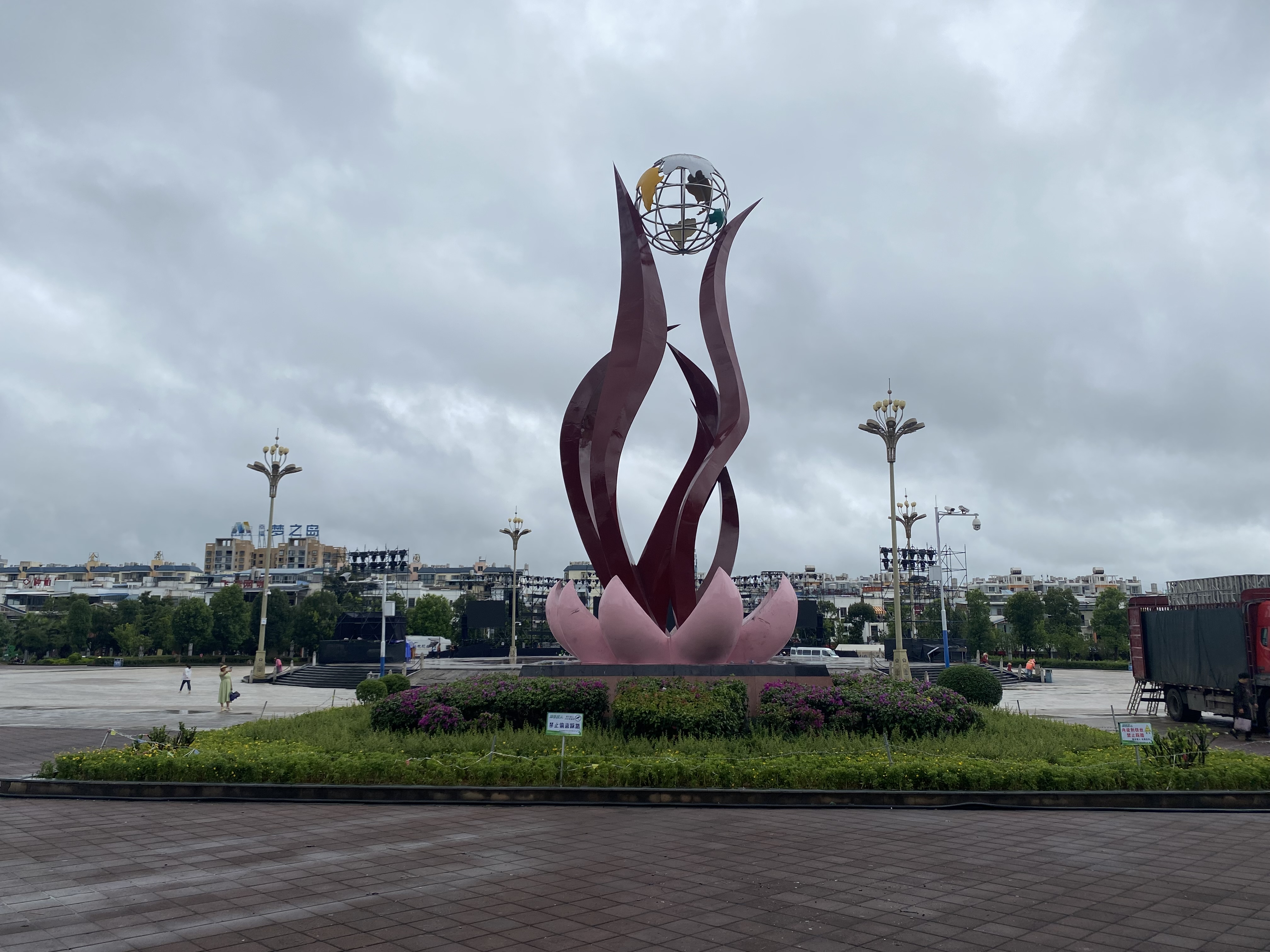
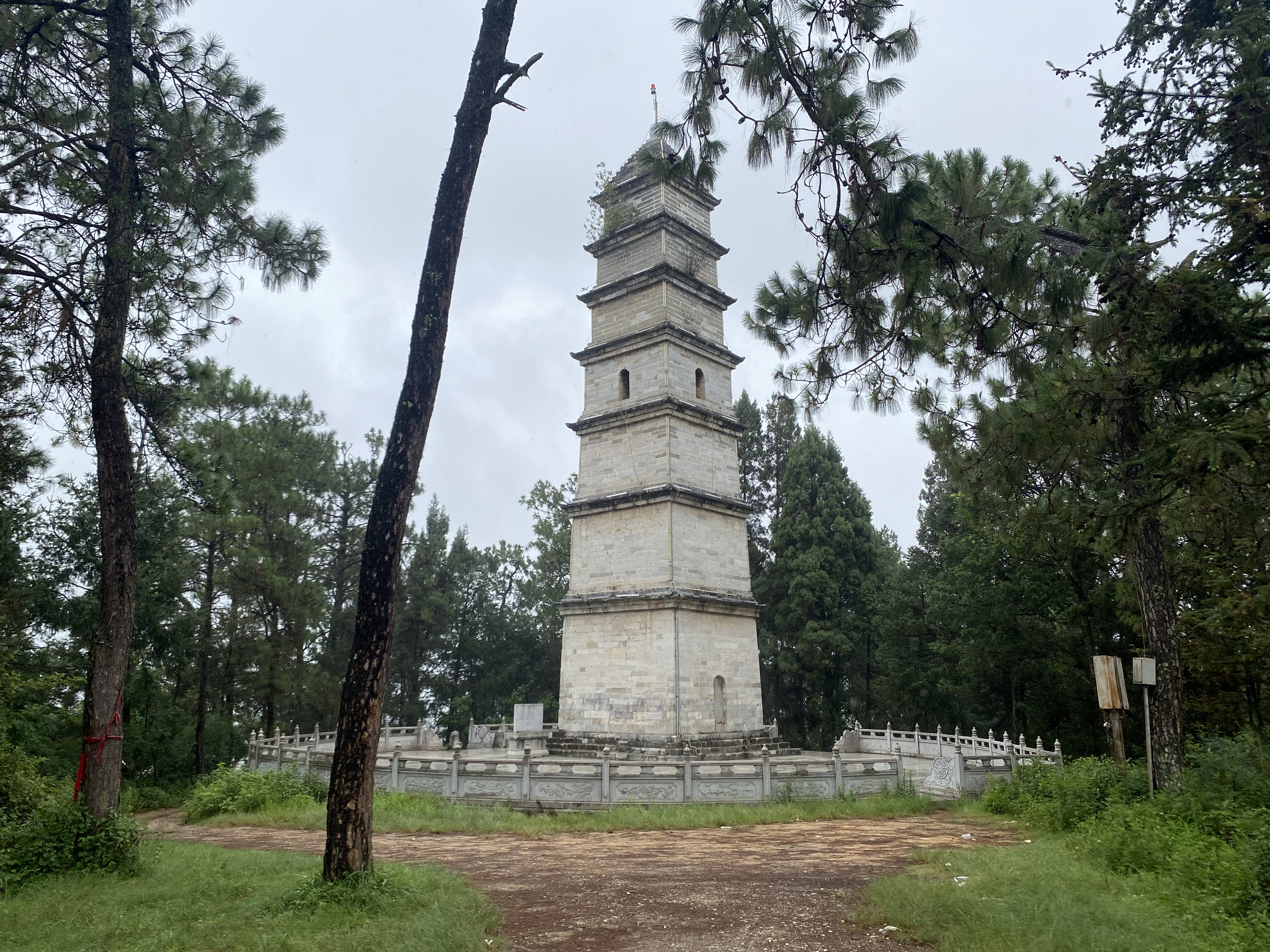
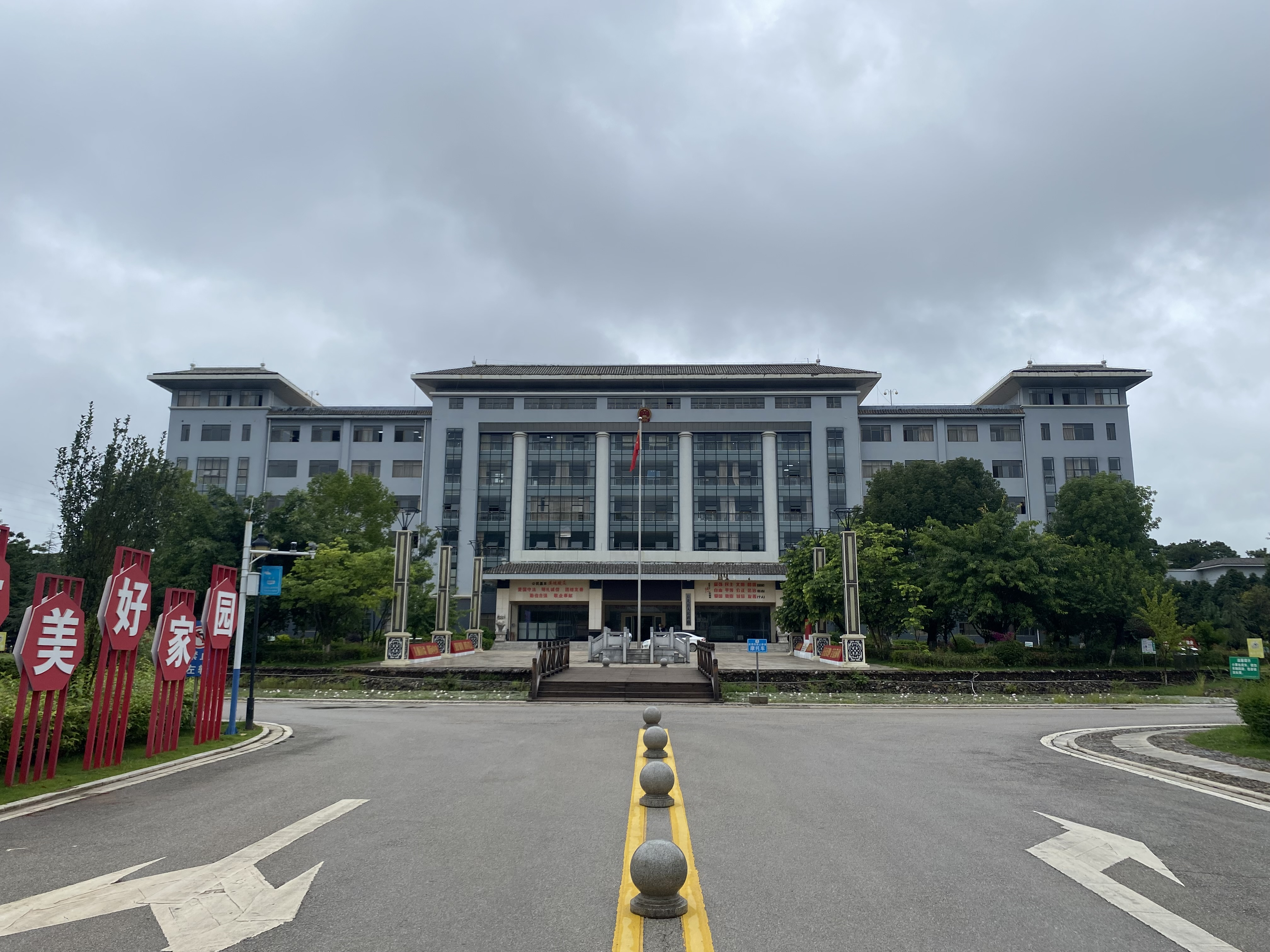
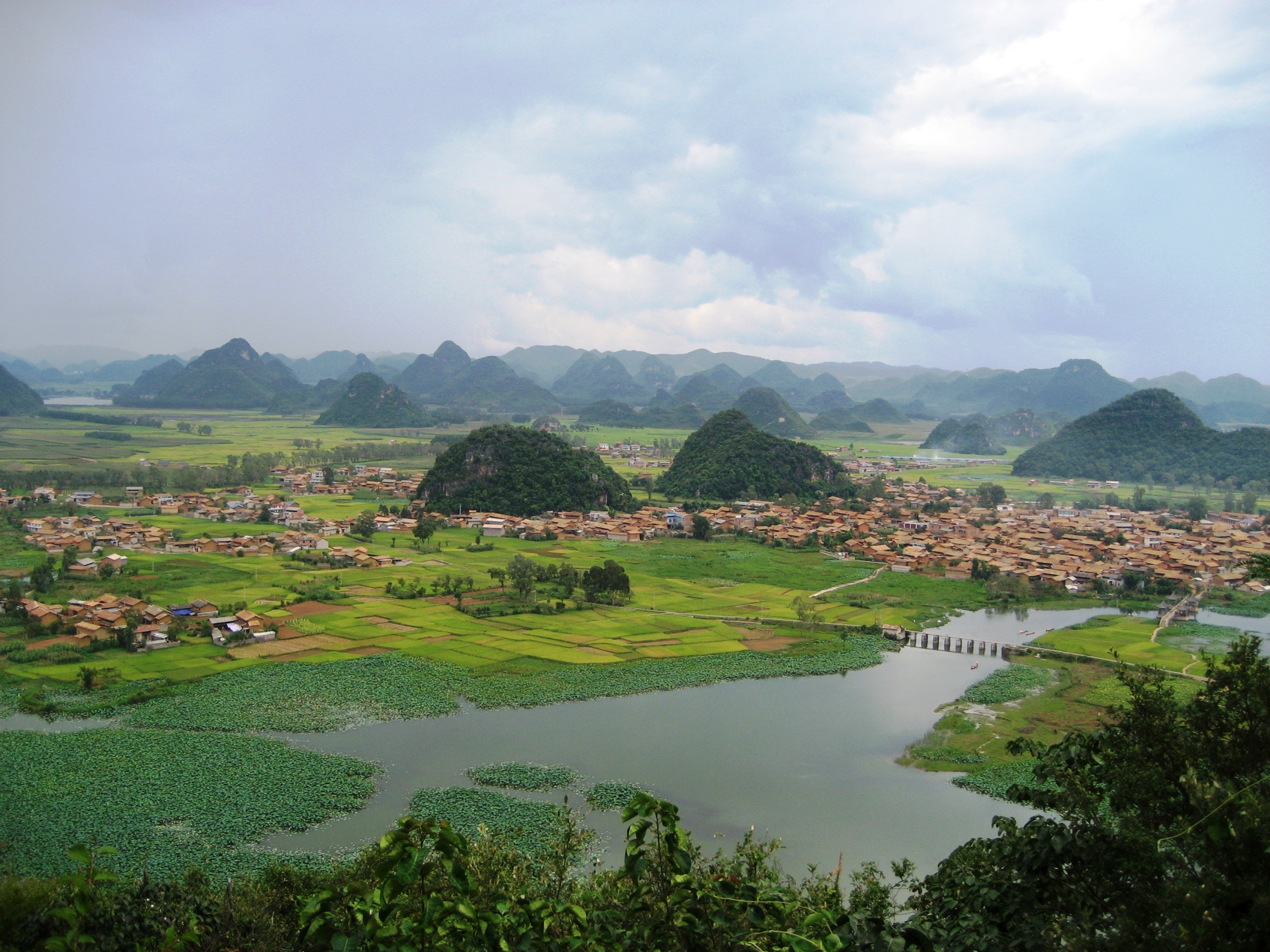
- Jiaolian Square Jinping Wenbi Tower County Hall Puzhehei Lake

- Location of Qiubei County (red) and Wenshan Prefecture (pink) within Yunnan

- Location within Yunnan
- Coordinates: 24°02′31″N 104°11′31″E
- Country: China
- Province: Yunnan
- Autonomous prefecture: Wenshan
- County seat: Jinping

Area
  - Total: 4,997 km^{2} (1,929 sq mi)

Population (2020 census)
  - Total: 468,172
  - Density: 93.69/km^{2} (242.7/sq mi)
- Time zone: UTC+8 (CST)
- Postal code: 663200
- Area code: 0876
- Website: www.ynqb.gov.cn

Qiubei County (Chinese: 丘北县; pinyin: Qiūběi Xiàn) is under the administration of the Wenshan Zhuang and Miao Autonomous Prefecture, in southeast Yunnan province, China.

Qiubei County is bordered by Guangnan County across the Qingshui River to the east, Yanshan County, Yunnan and Kaiyuan, Yunnan to the south, Mile City and Luxi County, Yunnan across the Nanpan River to the west, and Shizong County and Xilin County of Guangxi to the north.

== Administrative divisions ==
In the present, Qiubei County has 3 towns, 4 townships and 5 ethnic townships.

3 towns

- Jinping (锦屏镇)
- Yuezhe (曰者镇)
- Shuanglongying (双龙营镇)

4 townships

- Tianxing (天星乡)
- Pingzhai (平寨乡)
- Guanzhai (官寨乡)
- Wenliu (温浏乡)

5 ethnic townships

- Badaoshao Yi Ethnic Township (八道哨彝族乡)
- Shupi Yi Ethnic Township (树皮彝族乡)
- Nijiao Yi Ethnic Township (腻脚彝族乡)
- Xindian Yi Ethnic Township (新店彝乡族)
- Shede Yi Ethnic Township (舍得彝族乡)

== Ethnic groups ==
The Qiubei County Gazetteer 丘北县志 (1999) lists the following ethnic subgroups.

- Han
- Zhuang
- Miao
  - Green Miao 青苗 (autonym: Mengshi 蒙史)
  - White Miao 白苗 (autonym: Mengdou 蒙斗)
  - Flowery Miao 花苗 (autonym: Mengzhua 蒙爪)
- Yao
  - Landian Yao 蓝靛瑶
  - Daban Yao 大板瑶
  - Guoshan Yao 过山瑶
- Yi
  - Naisoupo 乃叟泼 (Black Yi 黑彝)
  - Guopo 锅泼 or Boren 僰人 (White Yi 白彝)
  - Sanipo 撒尼泼 (Sani 撒尼): in Badaoshao 八道哨, Shuanglongying 双龙营, and Yuezhe 曰者 (Wenshan Prefecture Ethnic Gazetteer 2005:352)
  - Poulongpo 剖笼泼 (Pula 仆拉)
  - Boren 僰人: in Shede 舍得 (in Bainitang 白泥塘), Yuezhe 曰者, Guanzhai 官寨, Shuanglongying 双龙营 (in Liuwanpo 六湾坡); also in Zhetai 者太 and Zhetu 者兔 of Guangnan County (Wenshan Prefecture Ethnic Gazetteer 2005:353); Luozidi 倮子地 and Dazhuqing Xinzhai 大竹箐新寨 of Shupi Township 树皮乡.
- Bai: in Mazhelong 马者龙, Buyi 布宜, Yayize 丫以则 (Upper and Lower 上下), Anuo 阿诺, Longga 龙嘎/戛, Yuezhe 曰者, Jiucheng 旧城; also in the townships of Shuanglongying 双龙营, Badaoshao 八道哨, Jinping 锦屏, Yuezhe 曰者, and Shupi 树皮; Jiayi 稼依镇 of Yanshan County (Wenshan Prefecture Ethnic Gazetteer 2005:172, 353)
- Hui: in Yuezhe 曰者 and Jinping 锦屏; also in Zhulin 珠琳 and Liancheng 莲城 of Guangnan County; Yanshan; Wenshan County

== Transport ==
- Nearest airport: Wenshan Airport
- Qiubei Tram

== Climate ==
Climate data for Qiubei, elevation 1,519 m (4,984 ft), (1991–2020 normals, extremes 1981–present)
Month	Jan	Feb	Mar	Apr	May	Jun	Jul	Aug	Sep	Oct	Nov	Dec	Year
Record high °C (°F)	27.5 (81.5)	30.6 (87.1)	31.8 (89.2)	34.1 (93.4)	34.9 (94.8)	33.7 (92.7)	32.6 (90.7)	32.5 (90.5)	31.9 (89.4)	31.0 (87.8)	30.0 (86.0)	28.8 (83.8)	34.9 (94.8)
Mean daily maximum °C (°F)	16.3 (61.3)	19.0 (66.2)	23.5 (74.3)	26.4 (79.5)	27.2 (81.0)	27.1 (80.8)	26.8 (80.2)	26.5 (79.7)	25.2 (77.4)	22.2 (72.0)	20.1 (68.2)	16.3 (61.3)	23.1 (73.5)
Daily mean °C (°F)	9.5 (49.1)	11.9 (53.4)	16.0 (60.8)	19.4 (66.9)	21.3 (70.3)	22.1 (71.8)	22.0 (71.6)	21.3 (70.3)	19.8 (67.6)	17.0 (62.6)	13.6 (56.5)	10.0 (50.0)	17.0 (62.6)
Mean daily minimum °C (°F)	5.3 (41.5)	7.2 (45.0)	10.8 (51.4)	14.3 (57.7)	16.8 (62.2)	18.6 (65.5)	18.8 (65.8)	18.1 (64.6)	16.4 (61.5)	13.7 (56.7)	9.5 (49.1)	5.9 (42.6)	13.0 (55.3)
Record low °C (°F)	−3.2 (26.2)	−2.5 (27.5)	−4.6 (23.7)	4.2 (39.6)	6.1 (43.0)	11.8 (53.2)	12.2 (54.0)	11.7 (53.1)	7.3 (45.1)	1.7 (35.1)	−2.9 (26.8)	−6.0 (21.2)	−6.0 (21.2)
Average precipitation mm (inches)	28.0 (1.10)	19.2 (0.76)	31.6 (1.24)	51.3 (2.02)	135.7 (5.34)	207.5 (8.17)	184.7 (7.27)	188.5 (7.42)	117.3 (4.62)	92.5 (3.64)	35.0 (1.38)	23.2 (0.91)	1,114.5 (43.87)
Average precipitation days (≥ 0.1 mm)	11.4	10.2	8.7	9.8	13.0	17.0	18.8	19.0	13.9	13.8	8.6	9.5	153.7
Average snowy days	1.3	0.4	0.1	0	0	0	0	0	0	0	0	0.3	2.1
Average relative humidity (%)	77	70	64	63	69	78	81	83	82	82	79	79	76
Mean monthly sunshine hours	149.6	160.1	191.2	211.6	203.5	152.2	143.3	144.0	135.0	121.1	155.4	138.4	1,905.4
Percentage possible sunshine	44	50	51	55	49	37	35	36	37	34	48	42	43
Source: China Meteorological Administrationall-time October recordall-time November record high

== See also ==
- Hanging coffins
