= Phowa language =

Loloish language spoken in China

Phowa
- Puwa
- Native to: China
- Native speakers: Hlepho: 36,000 (2011); Labo: 17,000 (2011); Ani: 10,000 (2011)
- Language family: Sino-Tibetan: Lolo-Burmese; Loloish; Southeastern; Highland Phula; Phowa
- Dialects: Ani–Labo; Hlepho–Phukha

Language codes
- ISO 639-3: Variously: yhl – Hlepho Phowa ypb – Labo Phowa ypn – Ani Phowa
- Glottolog: phow1235

Phowa is a dialect cluster of Loloish languages spoken by the Phula people of China. There are three principal varieties, Helpho, Ani, and Labo, which may be considered distinct languages. Helpho may be closer to Phukha than it is to Labo and Ani. Usage is decreasing, with about two-thirds of Phowa speaking their language.

The representative Helpho Phowa dialect studied in Pelkey (2011) is that of Feizuke 菲租克, Xinhua Township 新华乡, Pingbian County.
