= Axi language =

Loloish language spoken in China

Axi
- Axipo
- Native to: China
- Ethnicity: Yi
- Native speakers: 100,000 (2007)
- Language family: Sino-Tibetan: Tibeto-Burman; Lolo-Burmese; Loloish; Southeastern; Sani–Azha; Axi

Language codes
- ISO 639-3: yix
- Glottolog: axiy1235

Axi (Chinese: 阿细 Axi; Ahi; autonym: ɑ21 ɕi55 pʰo21) is one of the Loloish languages spoken by the Yi people of China. The Axi are one of the main linguistic sub-branches of Yi, and the Axi tiaoyue is a dance of the Axi speaking Yi people accompanied by the sanhu.

Axi is spoken in Mile, Shilin, Kunming, Luxi, and Huaning counties by about 110,000 speakers.

== Dialects ==
Wu (2014) divides Axi into three dialects and also provides word lists for each of the three dialects.

- The Western dialect 西阿土语 (approximately 75,000 speakers) is spoken in Mile (in Xishan 西山, Dongshan 东山, Midong 弥东, Jiangbian 江边, Buqi 补七); Qiubei (some areas), Lunan, Luxi, Huaning counties, etc.
- The Yanshan dialect 砚阿土语 (approximately 72,000 speakers) is spoken in Yanshan, Qiubei (some areas), Wenshan counties, etc.
- The Kunming dialect 昆阿土语 (approximately 23,000 speakers) is spoken in Kunming (Xishan, in Shuangshao 双哨; Anning); Luquan, Wuding counties, etc.

== Phonology ==
Axi consonants
		Labial	Alveolar		Alveolo- palatal	Retroflex		Velar
		Labial	plain	sibilant	Alveolo- palatal	plain	sibilant	Velar
Nasal		m	n					ŋ
Plosive/ Affricate	voiceless	p	t	t͡s	t͡ɕ	ʈ	t͡ʂ	k
Plosive/ Affricate	aspirated	pʰ	tʰ	t͡sʰ	t͡ɕʰ	ʈʰ	t͡ʂʰ	kʰ
Plosive/ Affricate	voiced	b	d	d͡z	d͡ʑ	ɖ	d͡ʐ	ɡ
Continuant	voiceless	f	ɬ	s	ɕ		ʂ	x
Continuant	voiced	v	l	z	ʑ		ʐ	ɣ

Axi vowels
	Front	Central	Back	
	Front	Central	unrd.	rnd.
Close	i, ḭ		ɯ, ɯ̰	u, ṵ
Mid	e, ḛ			o, o̰
Open-mid	ɛ, ɛ̰			
Open		a, a̰		
Syllabic consonant	ɹ̪̩, ɹ̪̰̩			

== See also ==
- Axi word list (Wiktionary)
