= Muji language =

Loloish language cluster of China

Muji
- Bokha
- Native to: China
- Native speakers: 55,000 (2007)
- Language family: Sino-Tibetan: Lolo-Burmese; Loloish; Southeastern; Highland Phula; Muji languages; Core Muji; Muji

Language codes
- ISO 639-3: Variously: ymc – Southern Muji ymq – Qila Muji ymx – Northern Muji (Bokha) ybk – Bokha (Black Muji) ypm – Phuma (Black Muji)
- Glottolog: core1246

Muji or Muzi is a Loloish language cluster spoken by the Phula people of China. It is one of several such languages to go by the name Muji. Muji varieties are Northern Muji, Qila Muji, Southern Muji, and Bokha–Phuma.

The representative Southern Muji dialect studied in Pelkey (2011) is that of Pujiazhai (普家寨), Adebo Township (阿德博乡), Jinping County.

Qila Muji is spoken in the following three villages:

- Qila (期腊) Laojizhai Township (老集寨乡), southern Jinping County, China
- Wantan, Jinshuihe Township 金水河镇, southern Jinping County, China
- Muong Gong, northwestern Lai Châu Province, Vietnam

== Phonology ==
Qila dialect has velar lateral affricates /k𝼄ʰ, k𝼄, ɡʟ̝/.
