= Shilin Yi Autonomous County =

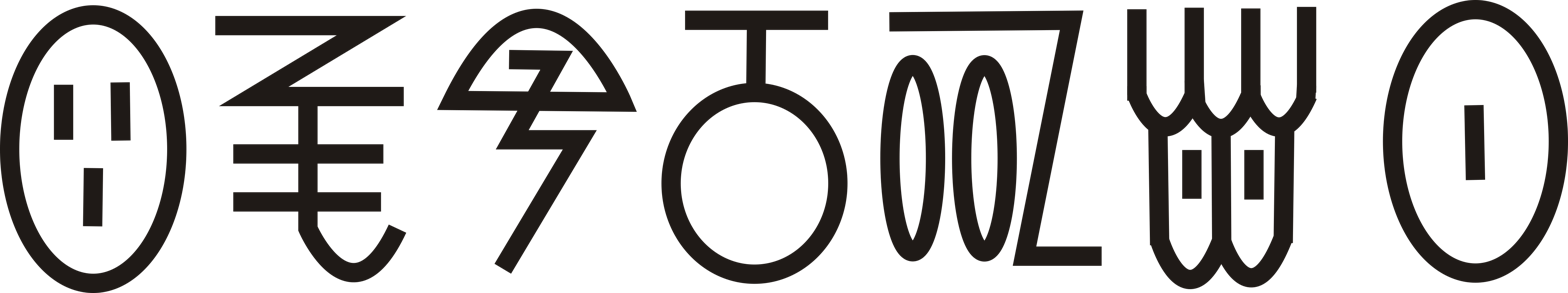
Shilin Yi Autonomous County 石林彝族自治县 ·
- Autonomous County
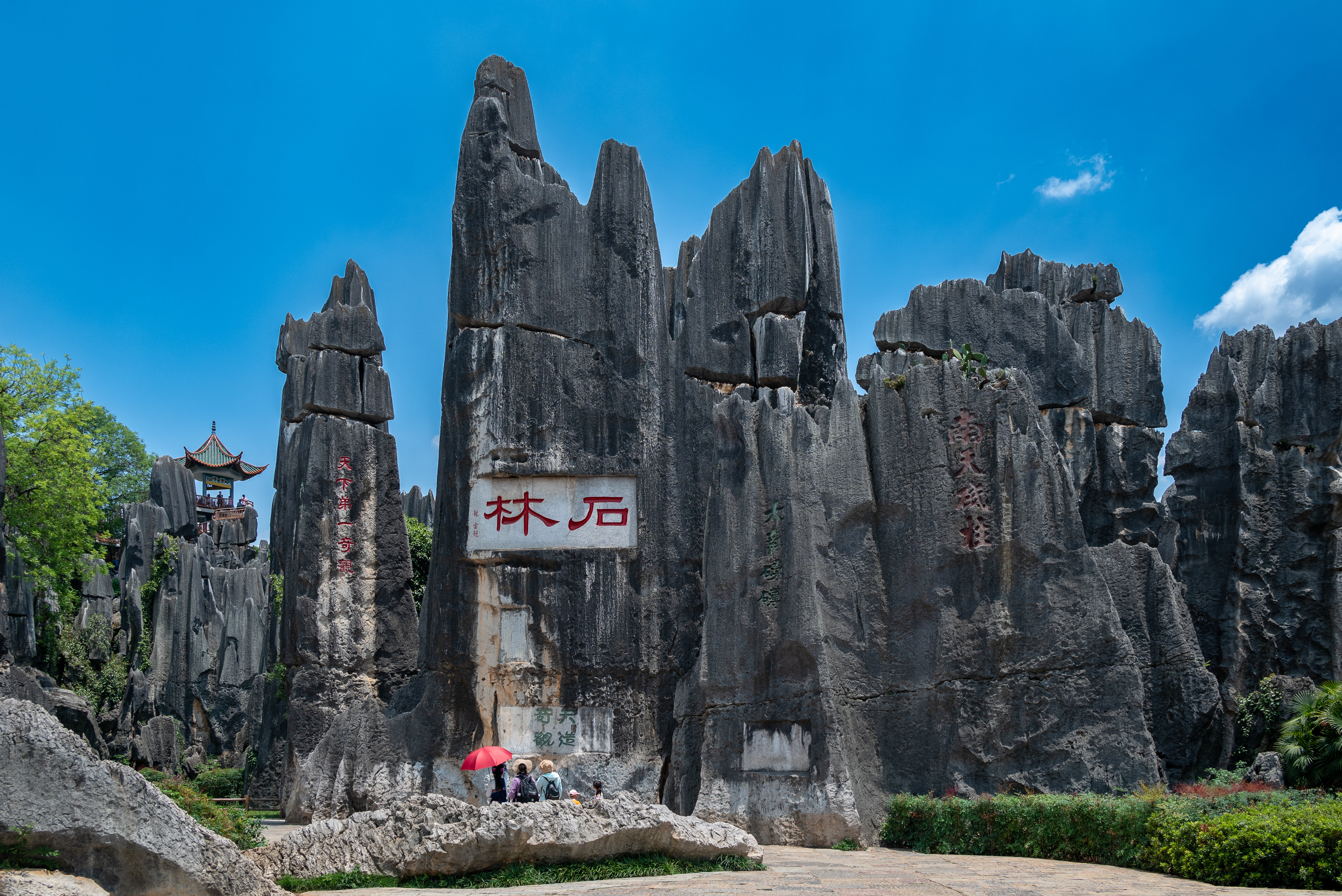
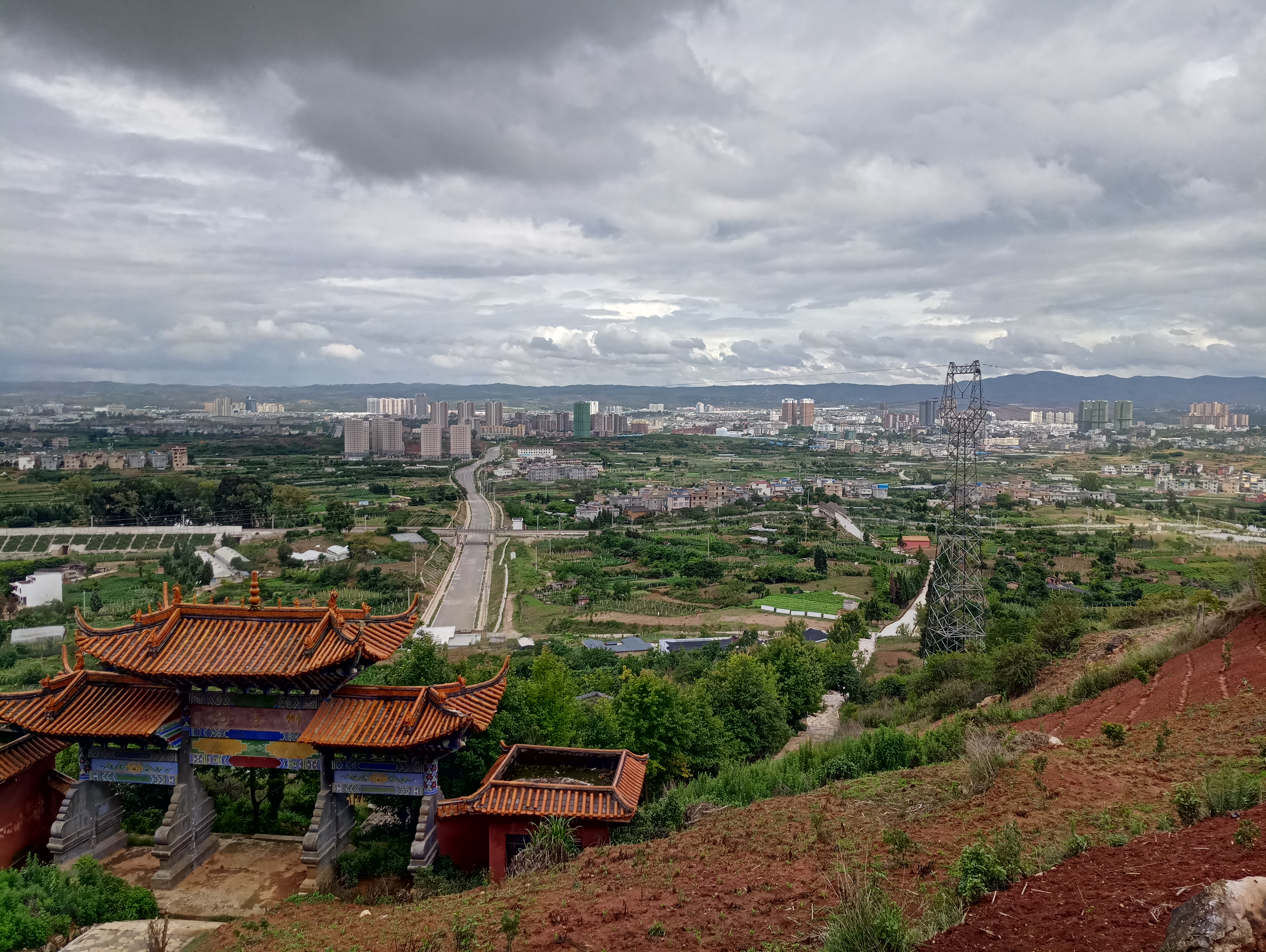
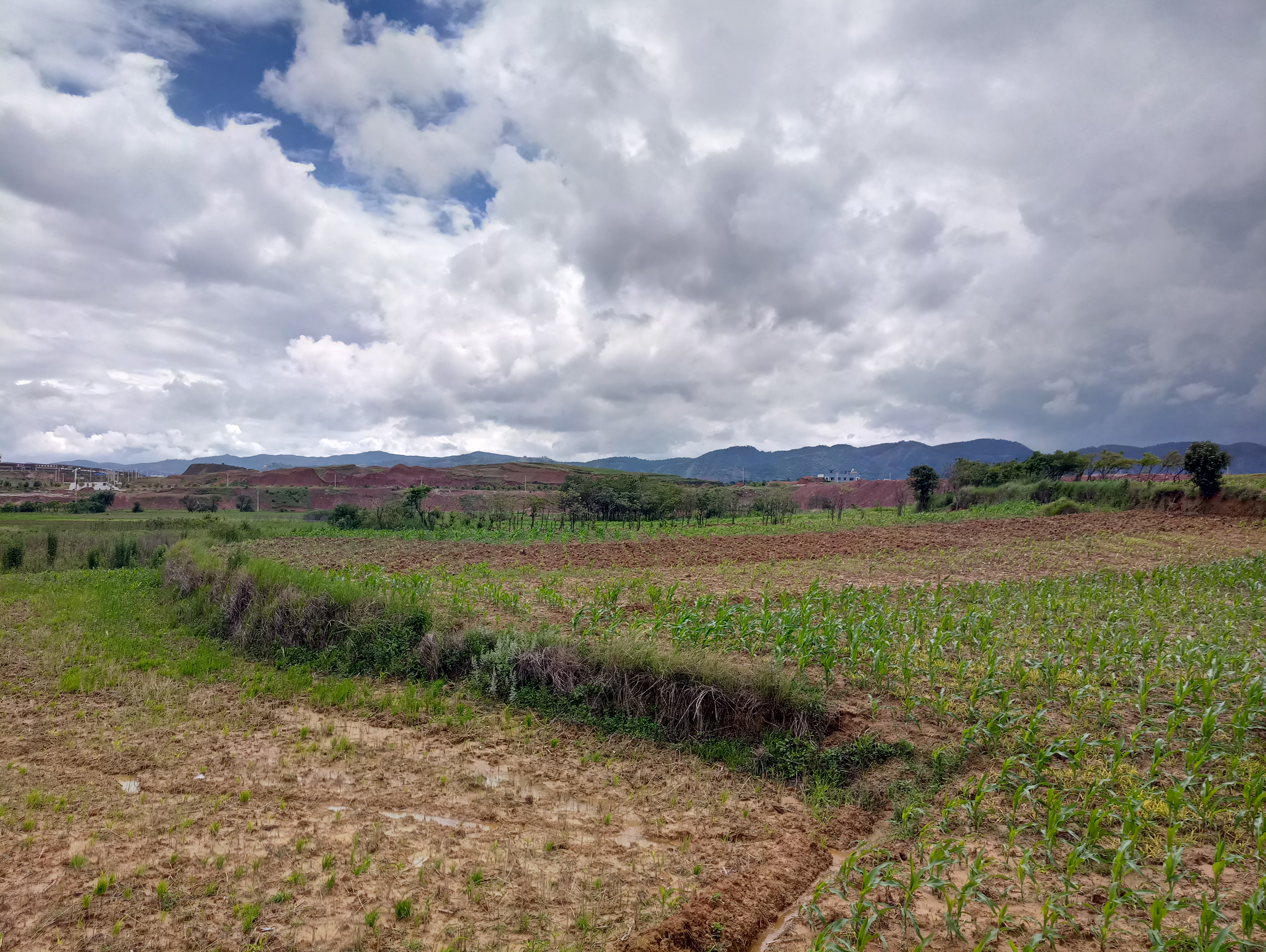
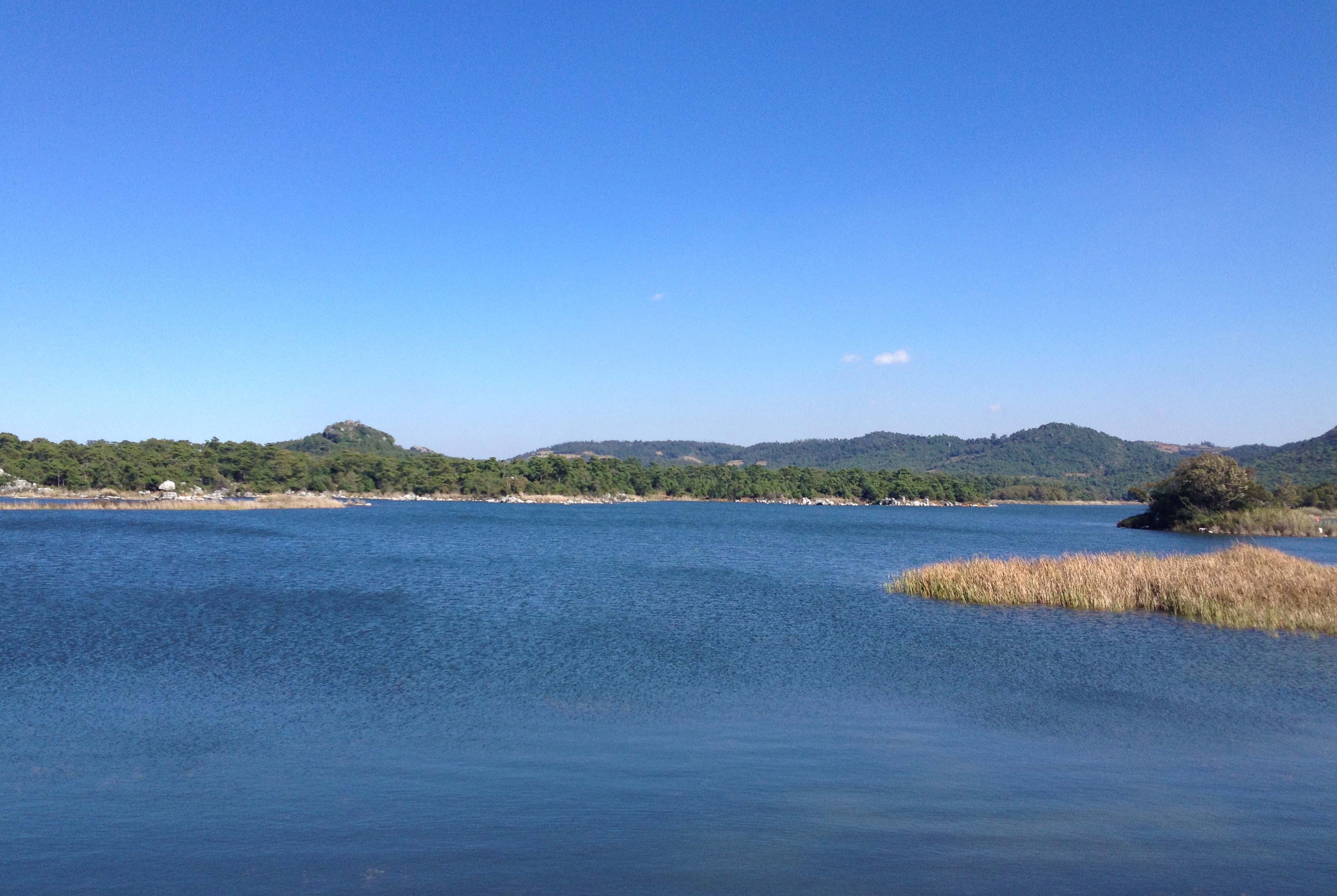
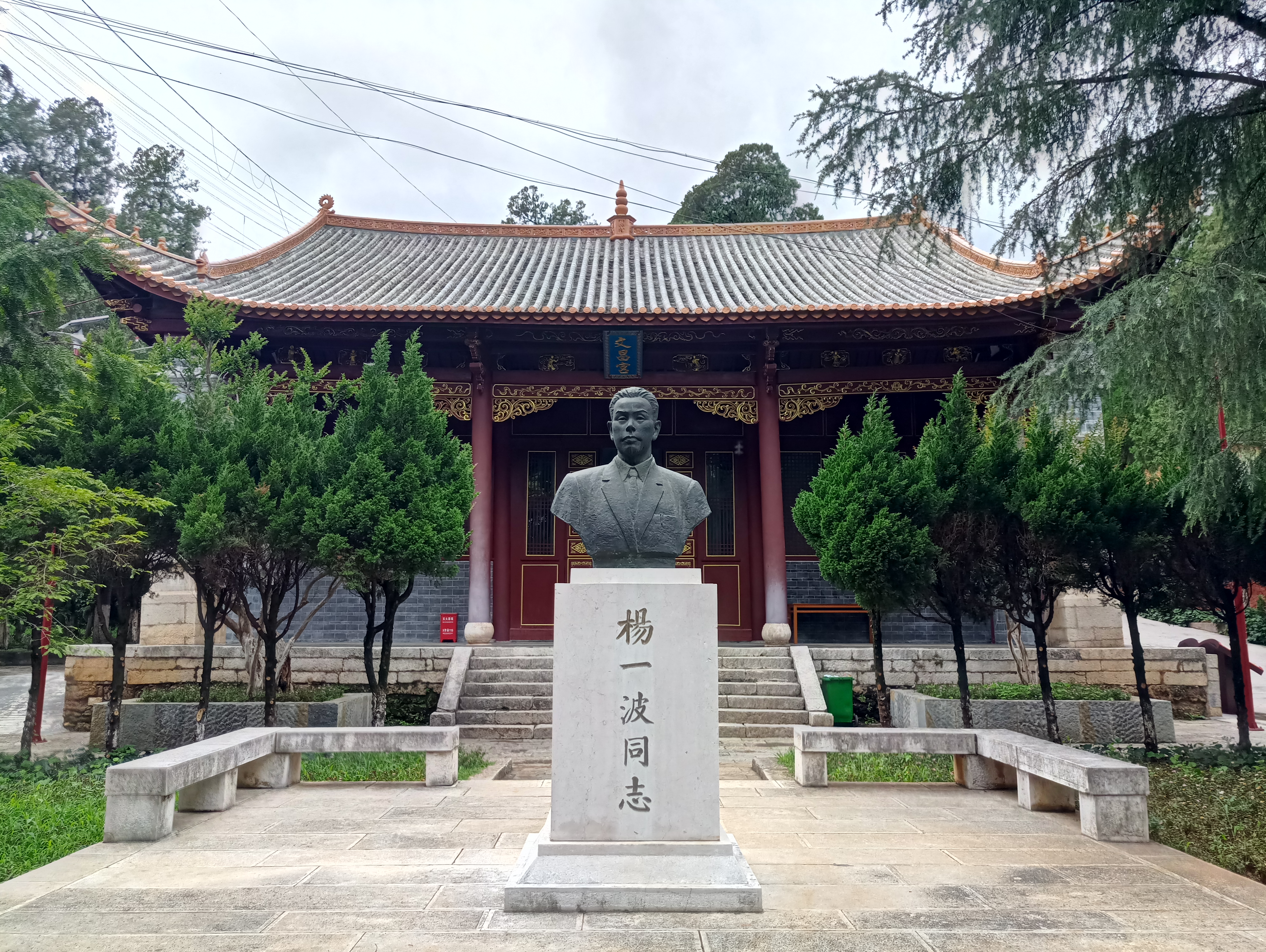
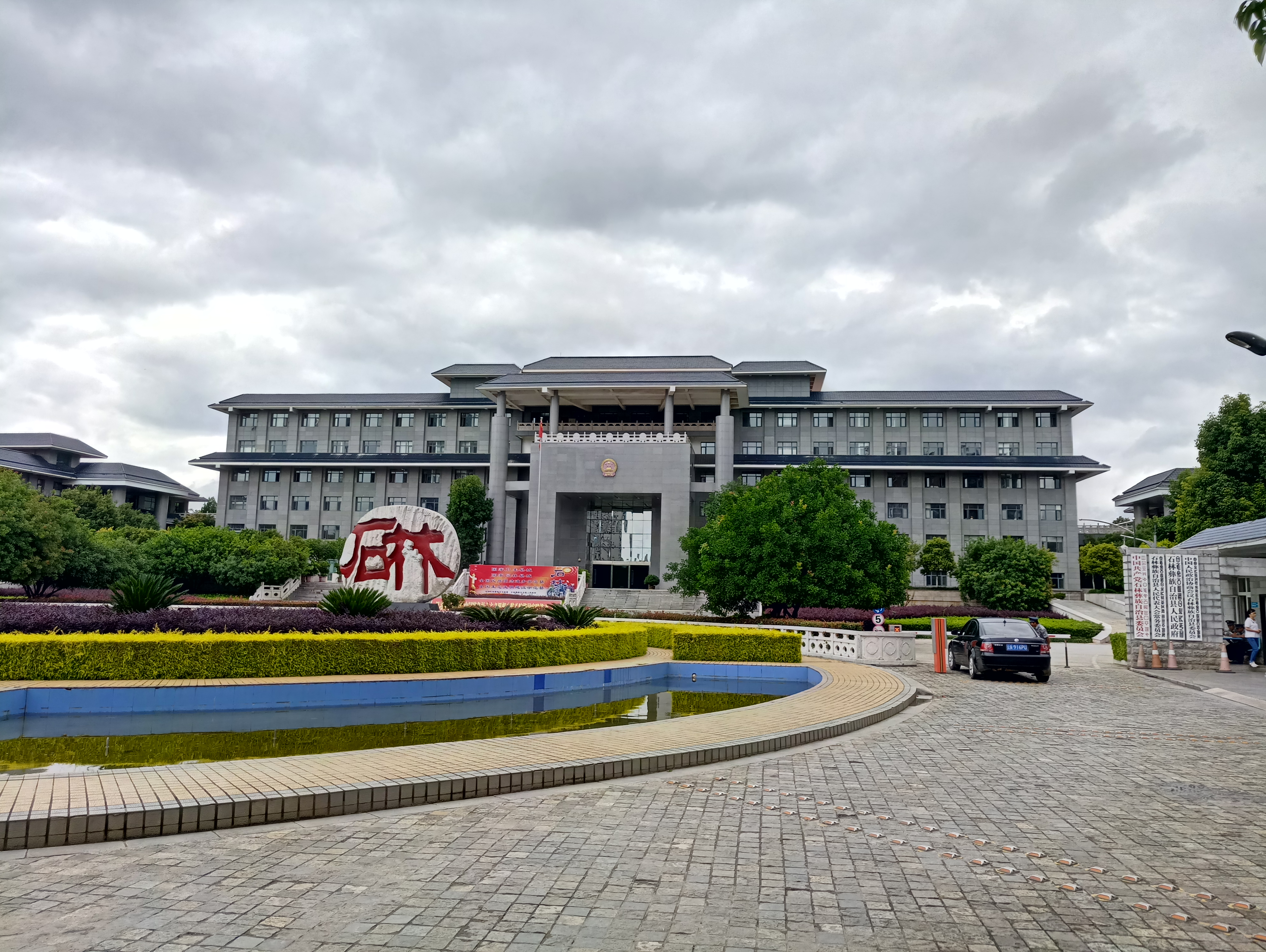
- Shilin Skyline of the county Corn field in Shilin Changhu Lake Lunan Confucian Temple Shilin County municipal hall
- Etymology: Stone Forest
- Nickname: Hometown of Ashima
- Location of the Shilin Yi Autonomous County (red) and Kunming City (pink) within Yunnan province

- Location of the seat in Yunnan
- Coordinates: 24°46′19″N 103°17′28″E
- Country: China
- Province: Yunnan
- Prefecture-level city: Kunming
- Founded: 1956
- County seat: Lufu Subdistrict

Area
  - Total: 1,680.09 km^{2} (648.69 sq mi)
- Elevation: 1,668 m (5,472 ft)

Population (2020 census)
  - Total: 240,827
  - Density: 143.342/km^{2} (371.253/sq mi)
- Time zone: UTC+8 (CST)
- Postal code: 652200
- Phone code: (0)871
- Website: www.kmsl.gov.cn

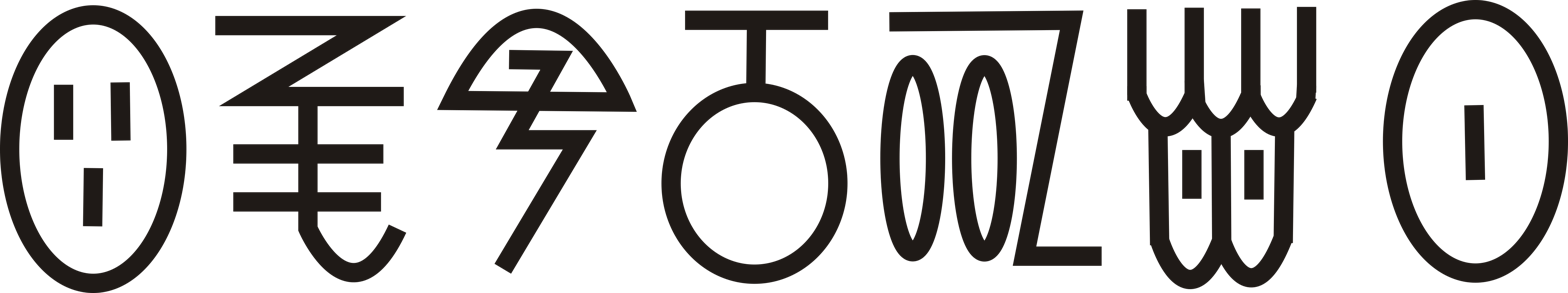
Shilin Yi Autonomous County (Chinese: 石林彝族自治县; pinyin: Shílín Yízú Zìzhìxiàn: Sani: ) is an autonomous county, under the jurisdiction of Kunming, the capital of Yunnan province, China. It borders Yiliang County, Kunming to the west, Luliang County to the northeast, Luxi County, Yunnan to the southeast, and Mile City to the south.

== Etymology ==
Lunan Yi Autonomous County (路南彝族自治县) is the former name of Shilin, and usually be called for short as Lunan County (路南县). The name of "Lunan" was first appeared in 1275, Yuan dynasty, when the administrative division of Lunan Zhou (路南州) established. The name Lunan means "South of Middle Lu (中路)". But in 1998, another said of the word's origin meaning was proposed when Lunan County apply for change the name to Shilin. The research shows "Lunan" means "South People (the most inferior people in Yuan dynasty citizen system) in Chengjiang Lu", it is a discriminatory name. Finally Lunan County was changed the name to Shilin, which means "stone forest", also is a famous tourist site in the county.

== History ==
Archaeological research show that as early as 800,000 years ago, humans began to settle in this region. Shilin area was dominated by Liangzhou (梁州) in Shang dynasty, and was governed by Chu Kingdom and Dian Kingdom in Warring States period. In 111 BC, the Han dynasty established counties in Yunnan area, and Shilin belonged to Tangao county (谈稿县), Zangke Jun (牂牁郡) (another said Lügao County (律高县), Yizhou Jun (益州郡)). After Zhuge Liang marched to the south, Shilin was conquered and still by governed by Tangao County, Jianning Jun (建宁郡). In the Southern Dynasties it was dominated by Cuanman clans, and in early Tang dynasty it was under the jurisdiction of Quanma County (泉麻县) and Longdi County (陇堤县) in Nanning Prefecture (南宁州). In Nanzhao and Dali period it was under the rule of Tuodong Jiedu (拓东节度) and Shanchan Fu (鄯阐府), later under Shicheng County (石城郡). In 742, Salü City (撒吕城) was built on Mount Xuedi (学地山) in today's Shilin urban, which can be seen as the establishment of the county seat today. In 1255 Möngke Khan established Luomeng Wanhufu (落蒙万户府), and implemented tusi system here. In 1270, Luomeng and other two Wanhufu compounded to Middle Lu Zongguanfu (中路总管府). The Zongguanfu was separated to two Lu, Shilin was Lunan Zhou under Chengjiang Lu. Sani Qin clan is the tusi of Lunan Zhou. Lunan surrendered to Ming dynasty in 1382 and still by governed by Chengjiang Fu.

== Administrative divisions ==
Shilin County is divided to 3 subdistricts, 3 towns and 1 township:

Subdistricts:

- Lufu Subdistrict (鹿阜街道), Shilin Subdistrict (石林街道), Banqiao Subdistrict (板桥街道)

Towns:

- Xijiekou Town (西街口镇), Changhu Town (长湖镇), Guishan Town (圭山镇)

Township:

- Dake Township (大可乡).

== Natural sites ==
The Shilin (Stone Forest), a set of remarkable karst formations, is part of the South China Karst, inscribed in 2007 on the UNESCO World Heritage List. Dadieshui Waterfall is the largest waterfall in Yunnan province, located at the southwest of county urban.

== Solarpower station ==
See also, Solar power in China

A large-scale solar power station in Shilin County had started construction on December 6, 2008. With a total installed capacity of 166 megawatts, the power station will be the largest experiment demonstration grid-connected solar photovoltaic power station in China.

== Climate ==
Climate data for Shilin, elevation 1,696 m (5,564 ft), (1991–2020 normals, extremes 1981–present)
Month	Jan	Feb	Mar	Apr	May	Jun	Jul	Aug	Sep	Oct	Nov	Dec	Year
Record high °C (°F)	25.7 (78.3)	29.0 (84.2)	30.9 (87.6)	32.7 (90.9)	34.4 (93.9)	33.1 (91.6)	31.7 (89.1)	31.8 (89.2)	31.7 (89.1)	29.0 (84.2)	28.5 (83.3)	26.3 (79.3)	34.4 (93.9)
Mean daily maximum °C (°F)	17.0 (62.6)	19.5 (67.1)	23.4 (74.1)	26.1 (79.0)	27.0 (80.6)	26.8 (80.2)	26.3 (79.3)	26.4 (79.5)	24.9 (76.8)	22.3 (72.1)	19.8 (67.6)	16.7 (62.1)	23.0 (73.4)
Daily mean °C (°F)	9.9 (49.8)	12.0 (53.6)	15.8 (60.4)	19.0 (66.2)	20.8 (69.4)	21.7 (71.1)	21.3 (70.3)	20.9 (69.6)	19.5 (67.1)	16.9 (62.4)	13.2 (55.8)	10.0 (50.0)	16.8 (62.1)
Mean daily minimum °C (°F)	4.7 (40.5)	6.3 (43.3)	9.8 (49.6)	13.2 (55.8)	16.1 (61.0)	18.1 (64.6)	18.2 (64.8)	17.7 (63.9)	16.2 (61.2)	13.6 (56.5)	8.9 (48.0)	5.4 (41.7)	12.4 (54.2)
Record low °C (°F)	−4.9 (23.2)	−2.8 (27.0)	−6.2 (20.8)	2.2 (36.0)	4.0 (39.2)	10.3 (50.5)	12.3 (54.1)	12.1 (53.8)	7.7 (45.9)	4.0 (39.2)	−2.2 (28.0)	−8.9 (16.0)	−8.9 (16.0)
Average precipitation mm (inches)	26.6 (1.05)	15.1 (0.59)	23.5 (0.93)	28.5 (1.12)	91.4 (3.60)	168.8 (6.65)	192.2 (7.57)	148.3 (5.84)	98.9 (3.89)	76.6 (3.02)	32.5 (1.28)	19.8 (0.78)	922.2 (36.32)
Average precipitation days (≥ 0.1 mm)	6.1	5.3	5.6	7.0	12.2	15.8	18.8	18.8	13.0	12.2	5.9	5.5	126.2
Average snowy days	1.0	0.4	0.1	0	0	0	0	0	0	0	0.1	0.2	1.8
Average relative humidity (%)	69	61	56	56	64	76	81	80	79	79	75	74	71
Mean monthly sunshine hours	192.0	203.8	237.3	243.5	217.3	153.8	131.5	147.9	135.1	140.1	174.0	165.8	2,142.1
Percentage possible sunshine	57	64	63	64	52	38	32	37	37	40	54	51	49
Source: China Meteorological Administrationall-time November record
