= Yanshan County, Yunnan =

Yanshan County 砚山县 · Yensanh Yen
- County
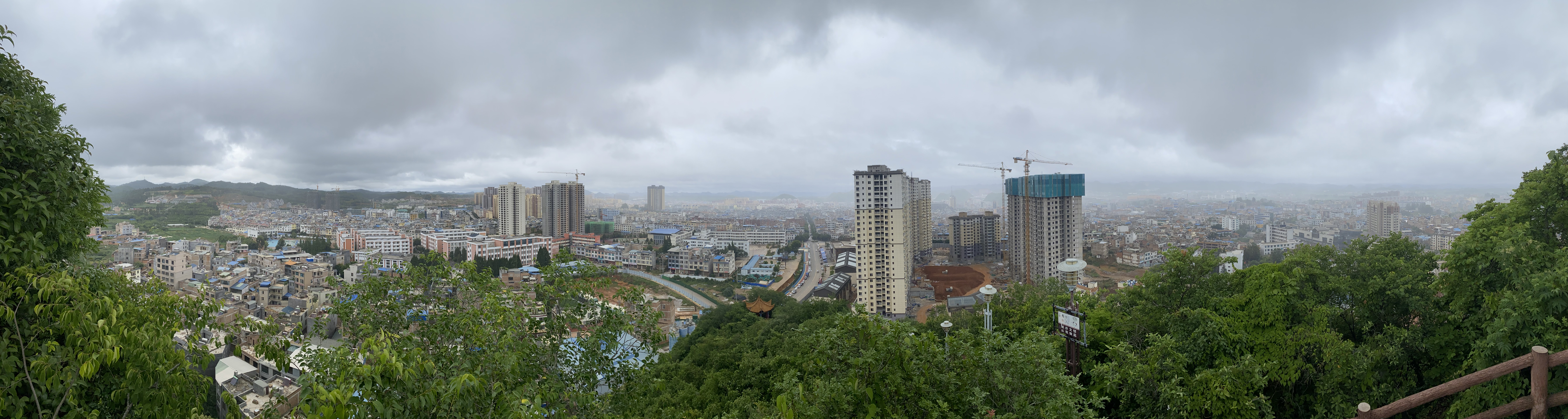
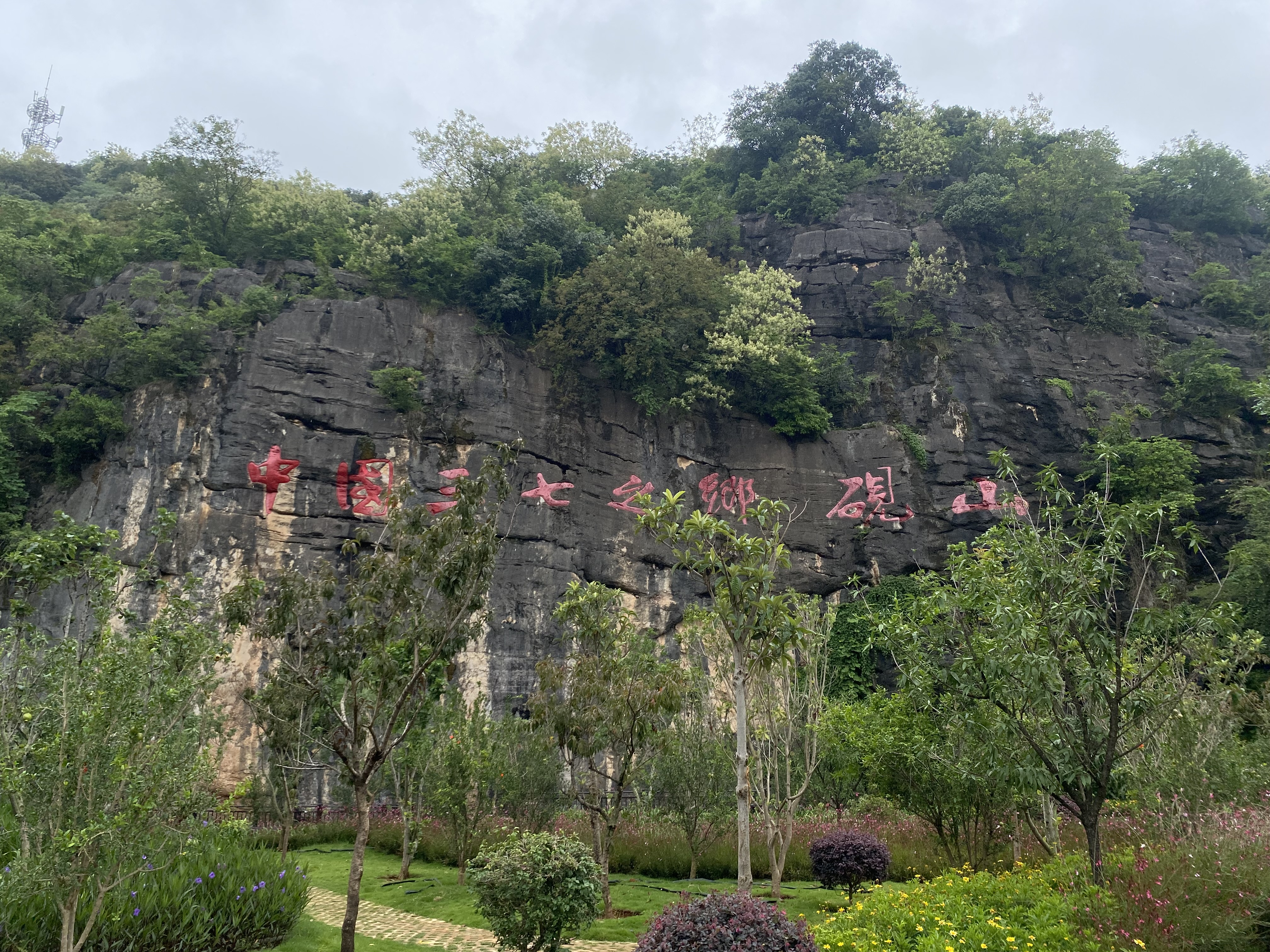
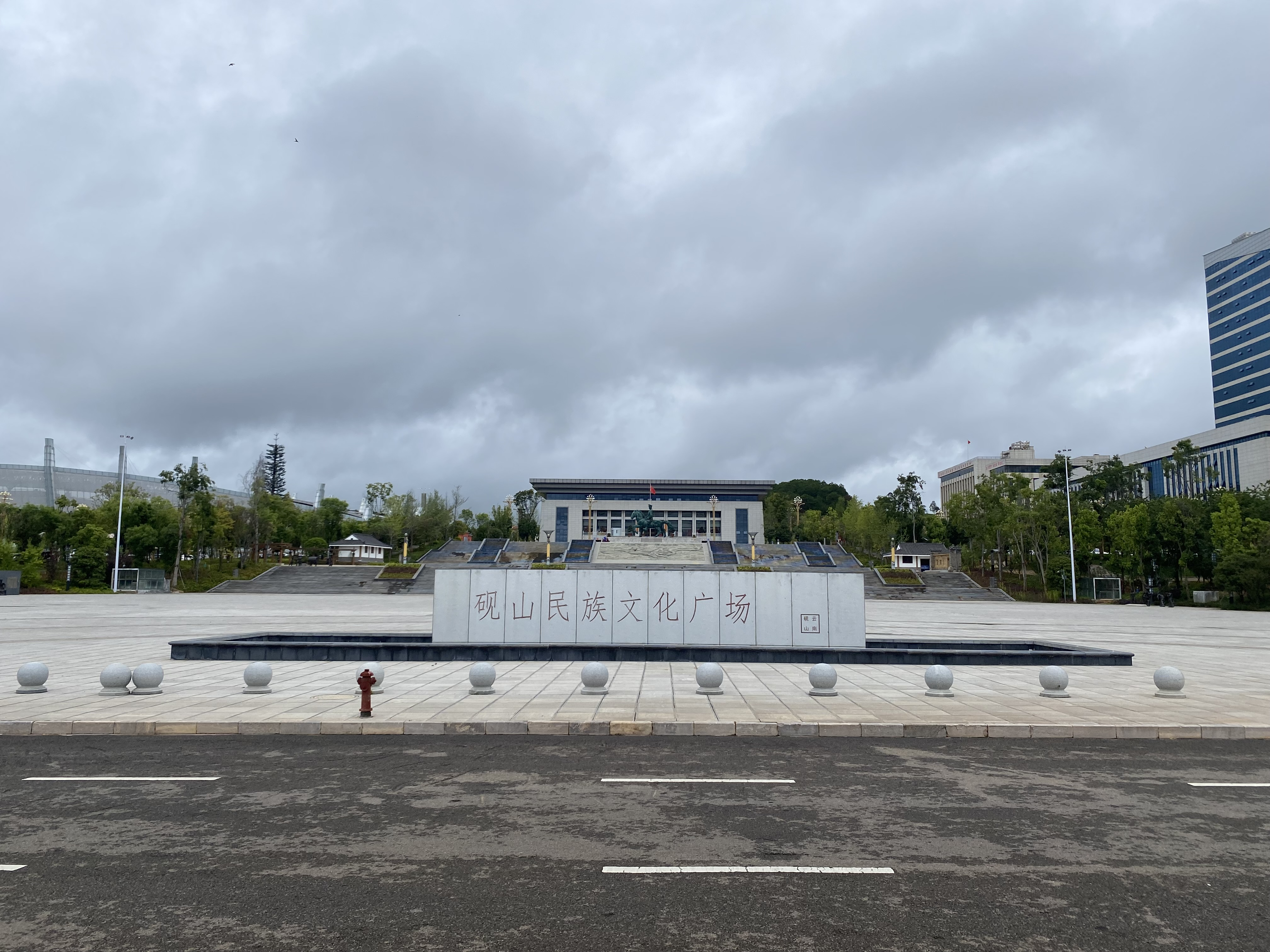
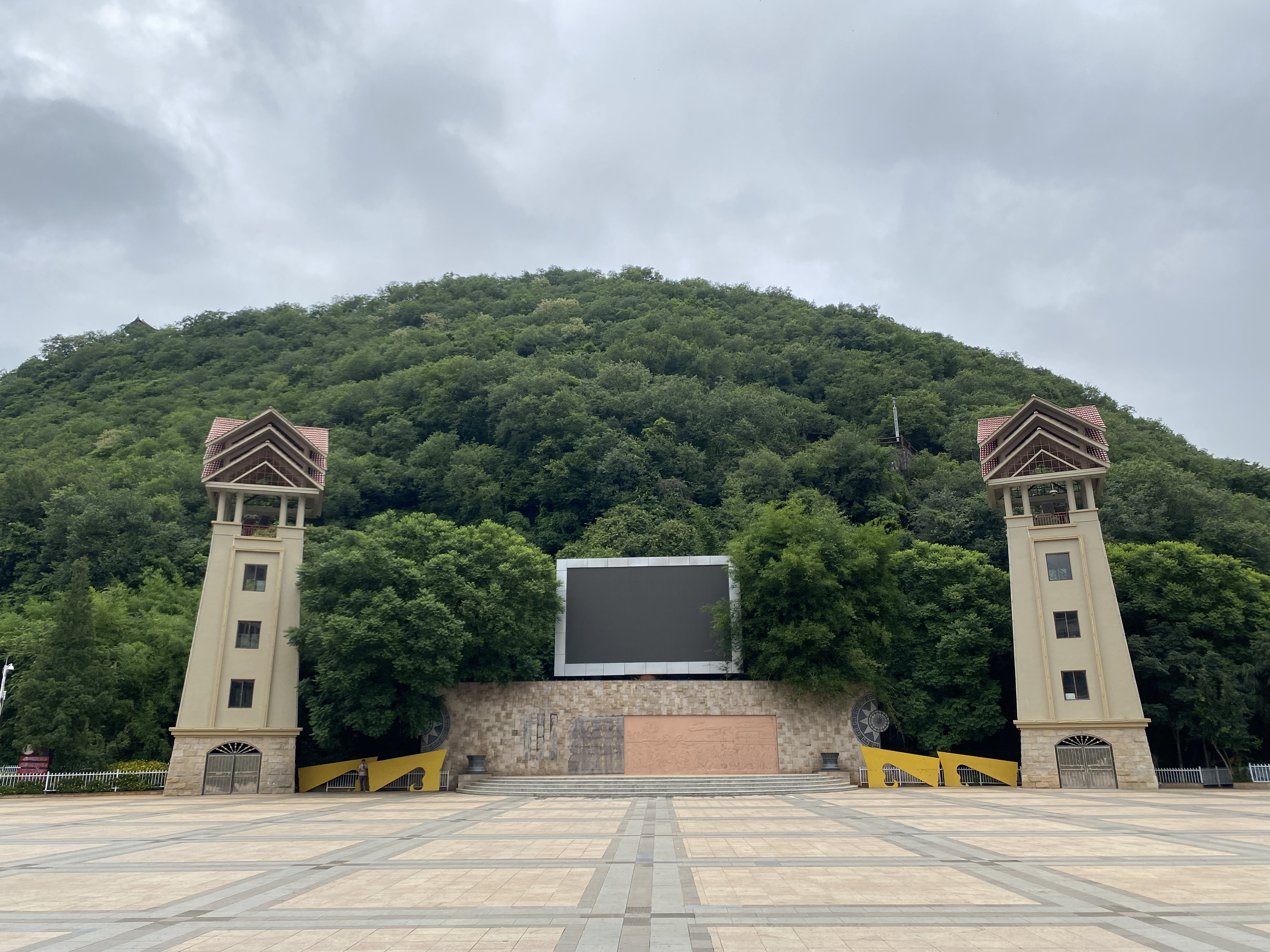
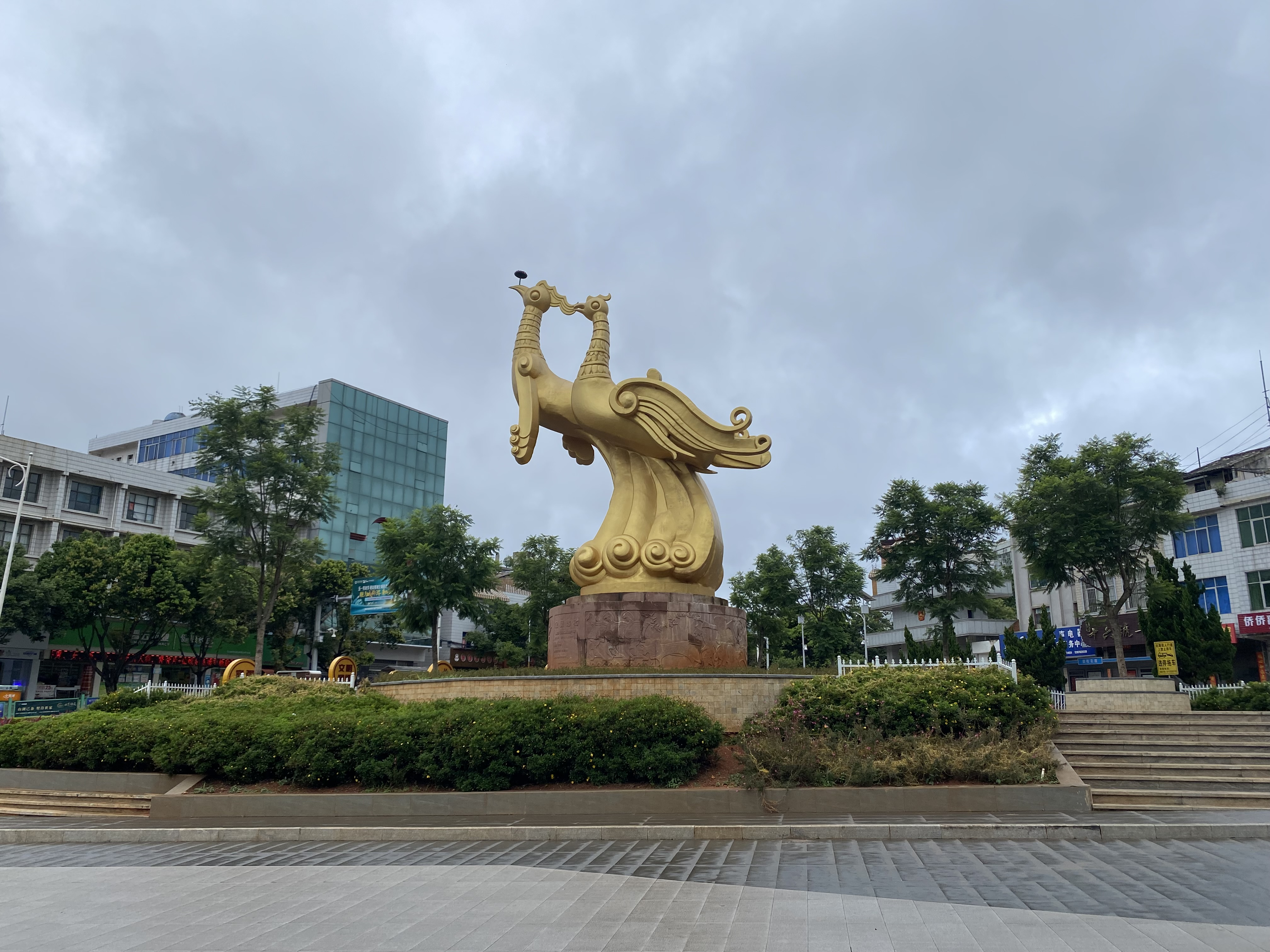
- Cityscape of county town "Hometown of Notoginseng in China" cliff inscriptions Yanshan National Culture Square Moshan Park Jin-Feng-Chuan-Qi sculpture

- Location of Yanshan County (red) and Wenshan (pink) within Yunnan

- Location within Yunnan
- Coordinates: 23°36′36″N 104°20′15″E
- Country: China
- Province: Yunnan
- Autonomous prefecture: Wenshan
- County seat: Jiangna

Area
  - Total: 3,888 km^{2} (1,501 sq mi)

Population (2020 census)
  - Total: 476,587
  - Density: 122.6/km^{2} (317.5/sq mi)
- Time zone: UTC+8 (CST)
- Postal code: 663100
- Area code: 0876
- Website: www.yanshan.gov.cn

Yanshan County (simplified Chinese: 砚山县; traditional Chinese: 硯山縣; pinyin: Yànshān Xiàn; Zhuang: Yensanh Yen) is under the administration of the Wenshan Zhuang and Miao Autonomous Prefecture, in the southeast of Yunnan province, China.

== Administrative divisions ==
In the present, Yanshan County has 4 towns 3 townships and 4 ethnic townships.

4 towns

- Jiangna (江那镇)
- Pingyuan (平远镇)
- Jiayi (稼依镇)
- Ameng (阿猛镇)

3 townships

- Baga (八嘎乡)
- Zhela (者腊乡)
- Bang'e (蚌峨乡)

4 ethnic townships

- Ashe Yi Ethnic Township (阿舍彝族乡)
- Weimo Yi Ethnic Township (维摩彝族乡)
- Panlong Yi Ethnic Township (盘龙彝族乡)
- Ganhe Yi Ethnic Township (干河彝族乡)

== Transport ==
- Nearest airport: Wenshan Airport

== Climate ==
Climate data for Yanshan, elevation 1,561 m (5,121 ft), (1991–2020 normals, extremes 1981–present)
Month	Jan	Feb	Mar	Apr	May	Jun	Jul	Aug	Sep	Oct	Nov	Dec	Year
Record high °C (°F)	28.1 (82.6)	29.9 (85.8)	32.0 (89.6)	32.9 (91.2)	34.9 (94.8)	32.5 (90.5)	31.9 (89.4)	30.7 (87.3)	31.1 (88.0)	30.1 (86.2)	29.5 (85.1)	27.3 (81.1)	34.9 (94.8)
Mean daily maximum °C (°F)	15.7 (60.3)	18.5 (65.3)	22.7 (72.9)	25.6 (78.1)	26.3 (79.3)	26.3 (79.3)	25.9 (78.6)	25.8 (78.4)	24.7 (76.5)	21.8 (71.2)	19.5 (67.1)	16.1 (61.0)	22.4 (72.3)
Daily mean °C (°F)	9.3 (48.7)	11.6 (52.9)	15.3 (59.5)	18.6 (65.5)	20.4 (68.7)	21.3 (70.3)	21.2 (70.2)	20.7 (69.3)	19.4 (66.9)	16.8 (62.2)	13.5 (56.3)	10.0 (50.0)	16.5 (61.7)
Mean daily minimum °C (°F)	5.5 (41.9)	7.3 (45.1)	10.5 (50.9)	13.9 (57.0)	16.4 (61.5)	18.2 (64.8)	18.3 (64.9)	17.8 (64.0)	16.3 (61.3)	13.8 (56.8)	9.8 (49.6)	6.3 (43.3)	12.8 (55.1)
Record low °C (°F)	−3.0 (26.6)	−3.9 (25.0)	−2.6 (27.3)	3.6 (38.5)	7.9 (46.2)	11.2 (52.2)	13.0 (55.4)	12.9 (55.2)	8.6 (47.5)	4.1 (39.4)	−0.1 (31.8)	−4.2 (24.4)	−4.2 (24.4)
Average precipitation mm (inches)	21.7 (0.85)	17.3 (0.68)	37.0 (1.46)	51.2 (2.02)	105.2 (4.14)	163.4 (6.43)	190.9 (7.52)	172.2 (6.78)	104.0 (4.09)	64.8 (2.55)	35.5 (1.40)	24.3 (0.96)	987.5 (38.88)
Average precipitation days (≥ 0.1 mm)	8.3	7.2	7.3	9.7	13.1	17.4	19.8	19.3	12.5	11.5	7.6	6.5	140.2
Average snowy days	0.7	0.2	0.2	0	0	0	0	0	0	0	0	0.2	1.3
Average relative humidity (%)	81	76	71	70	74	82	85	85	83	83	81	81	79
Mean monthly sunshine hours	143.9	157.1	187.1	204.2	187.6	139.2	130.0	137.9	131.1	119.4	149.3	141.2	1,828
Percentage possible sunshine	43	49	50	53	46	34	31	35	36	34	46	43	42
Source: China Meteorological Administrationall-time November record
