= Phù Lá people =

Ethnic group

Phù Lá
Total population
- Vietnam 12,471 (2019); China 4,200

Regions with significant populations
- Lào Cai, northern Vietnam

Languages
- Phula languages • Vietnamese

Religion
- Animism

The Pula or Phù Lá are an ethnic group of Vietnam and China. Most Pula live in Xichou County and Maguan County of Wenshan Prefecture of Yunnan and the bordering Lào Cai Province of the Northeast region of Vietnam. Their population in Vietnam is 12,471 in 2019. There are also approximately 4,200 Phù Lá in China, where they are classified as members of the Yi ethnic group.

The Phù Lá speak various Loloish languages, though many are shifting to Vietnamese or to Southwestern Mandarin Chinese (Quan hỏa).

The Phula sing Êmê kha bá and play the ma nhí (bamboo mouth organ), pi tót, and cúc kẹ (nose flute) musical instruments. They celebrate the Gù Shư Mu festival and Ga Ta Ma Chu festival.

== Subdivisions ==
According to Edmondson (2003), a 1978 Vietnamese report called "Ethnic minority peoples of Vietnam" had described 6 groups of peoples belonging to the Phù Lá ethnic group. However, since 1978, the statuses of many of these groups had changed considerably.

- Phù Lá Hán (Phu Kha, Phu Khla, Chinese Phù Lá, autonym pʰu31 kʰa33 or pʰu31 kɬʰa33): Lùng Phình Commune, Bẳc Hà District, and Tả Chu Phùng, Mường Khương District, Lào Cai Province, Vietnam. The Phù Lá Hán are said to have arrived in Vietnam in two waves, once in the 15th century, and later in the 18th century. Mai (1995) reported that the Chù Lá Phù Lá and Phù Lá Trắng are regarded as part of the Phù Lá Hán as of 1995.
  - Chù Lá Phù Lá: Lùng Phình Commune, Bắc Hà District, Lào Cai Province, Vietnam.
  - Phù Lá Trắng (White Phù Lá): Mường Khương District, Lào Cai Province, Vietnam.
- Phù Lá Lão (Xá Phó, Laghuu): southwest bank of the Red River in Sơn La and Lai Châu provinces.
- Phù Lá Đen (Black Phù Lá): A Lù Commune, Bát Xát District, Lào Cai Province. Mai (1995) reports that they have returned to China, where they had originally immigrated from.
- Phù Lá Hoa (Flowery Phù Lá): Nàn Xỉ, Xin Mần District, Hà Giang Province; A Lù Commune, Bát Xát District, Lào Cai Province; some living with the Xá Phó of Bảo Thắng District, Lào Cai Province. Mai (1995) reports that they have returned to China, where they had originally immigrated from.
