= List of administrative divisions of Yunnan =

Yunnan Province
- Province
- Capital: Kunming

Prefecture-level divisions
- Prefectural cities: 8
- Autonomous prefectures: 8

County level divisions
- County cities: 17
- Counties: 66
- Autonomous counties: 29
- Districts: 17

Township level divisions
- Towns: 683
- Townships: 545
- Ethnic townships: 151
- Subdistricts: 175

Villages level divisions
- Communities: 2,421
- Administrative villages: 11,902
- Source: Yunnan Statistical Yearbook 2018

Yunnan, a province of the People's Republic of China, is made up of the following administrative divisions.

== Administrative divisions ==
All of these administrative divisions are explained in greater detail at political divisions of China.

Prefecture level	County Level				
Prefecture level	Name	Chinese	Hanyu Pinyin	Division code	
Kunming city 昆明市; Kūnmíng Shì (Capital) (5301 / KMG)	Wuhua District	五华区	Wǔhuá Qū	530102	WHA
Kunming city 昆明市; Kūnmíng Shì (Capital) (5301 / KMG)	Panlong District	盘龙区	Pánlóng Qū	530103	PLQ
Kunming city 昆明市; Kūnmíng Shì (Capital) (5301 / KMG)	Guandu District	官渡区	Guāndù Qū	530111	GDU
Kunming city 昆明市; Kūnmíng Shì (Capital) (5301 / KMG)	Xishan District	西山区	Xīshān Qū	530112	XSN
Kunming city 昆明市; Kūnmíng Shì (Capital) (5301 / KMG)	Dongchuan District	东川区	Dōngchuān Qū	530113	DCU
Kunming city 昆明市; Kūnmíng Shì (Capital) (5301 / KMG)	Chenggong District	呈贡区	Chénggòng Qū	530114	CGG
Kunming city 昆明市; Kūnmíng Shì (Capital) (5301 / KMG)	Jinning District	晋宁区	Jìnníng Qū	530115	JNE
Kunming city 昆明市; Kūnmíng Shì (Capital) (5301 / KMG)	Fumin County	富民县	Fùmín Xiàn	530124	FMN
Kunming city 昆明市; Kūnmíng Shì (Capital) (5301 / KMG)	Yiliang County	宜良县	Yíliáng Xiàn	530125	YIL
Kunming city 昆明市; Kūnmíng Shì (Capital) (5301 / KMG)	Shilin County (Note: Conventional name: Shilin Yi Autonomous County; Chinese: 石林彝族自治县; pinyin: Shílín Yízú Zìzhìxiàn)	石林县	Shílín Xiàn	530126	SLY
Kunming city 昆明市; Kūnmíng Shì (Capital) (5301 / KMG)	Songming County	嵩明县	Sōngmíng Xiàn	530127	SMI
Kunming city 昆明市; Kūnmíng Shì (Capital) (5301 / KMG)	Luquan County (Note: Conventional name: Luquan Yi and Miao Autonomous County; Chinese: 禄劝彝族苗族自治县; pinyin: Lùquàn Yízú Miáozú Zìzhìxiàn)	禄劝县	Lùquàn Xiàn	530128	LUC
Kunming city 昆明市; Kūnmíng Shì (Capital) (5301 / KMG)	Xundian County (Note: Conventional name: Xundian Hui and Yi Autonomous County; Chinese: 寻甸回族彝族自治县; pinyin: Xúndiàn Huízú Yízú Zìzhìxiàn)	寻甸县	Xúndiàn Xiàn	530129	XDN
Kunming city 昆明市; Kūnmíng Shì (Capital) (5301 / KMG)	Anning city	安宁市	Ānníng Shì	530181	ANG
Qujing city 曲靖市; Qǔjìng Shì (5303 / QJS)	Qilin District	麒麟区	Qílín Qū	530302	QLQ
Qujing city 曲靖市; Qǔjìng Shì (5303 / QJS)	Zhanyi District	沾益区	Zhānyì Qū	530303	ZYB
Qujing city 曲靖市; Qǔjìng Shì (5303 / QJS)	Malong District	马龙区	Mǎlóng Qū	530304	
Qujing city 曲靖市; Qǔjìng Shì (5303 / QJS)	Luliang County	陆良县	Lùliáng Xiàn	530322	LLX
Qujing city 曲靖市; Qǔjìng Shì (5303 / QJS)	Shizong County	师宗县	Shīzōng Xiàn	530323	SZD
Qujing city 曲靖市; Qǔjìng Shì (5303 / QJS)	Luoping County	罗平县	Luópíng Xiàn	530324	LPX
Qujing city 曲靖市; Qǔjìng Shì (5303 / QJS)	Fuyuan County	富源县	Fùyuán Xiàn	530325	FYD
Qujing city 曲靖市; Qǔjìng Shì (5303 / QJS)	Huize County	会泽县	Huìzé Xiàn	530326	HUZ
Qujing city 曲靖市; Qǔjìng Shì (5303 / QJS)	Xuanwei city	宣威市	Xuānwēi Shì	530381	XWS
Yuxi city 玉溪市; Yùxī Shì (5304 / YXS)	Hongta District	红塔区	Hóngtǎ Qū	530402	HTA
Yuxi city 玉溪市; Yùxī Shì (5304 / YXS)	Jiangchuan District	江川区	Jiāngchuān Qū	530403	JCY
Yuxi city 玉溪市; Yùxī Shì (5304 / YXS)	Tonghai County	通海县	Tōnghǎi Xiàn	530423	THI
Yuxi city 玉溪市; Yùxī Shì (5304 / YXS)	Huaning County	华宁县	Huáníng Xiàn	530424	HND
Yuxi city 玉溪市; Yùxī Shì (5304 / YXS)	Yimen County	易门县	Yìmén Xiàn	530425	YMD
Yuxi city 玉溪市; Yùxī Shì (5304 / YXS)	Eshan County (Note: Conventional name: Eshan Yi Autonomous County; Chinese: 峨山彝族自治县; pinyin: Éshān Yízú Zìzhìxiàn)	峨山县	Éshān Xiàn	530426	ESN
Yuxi city 玉溪市; Yùxī Shì (5304 / YXS)	Xinping County (Note: Conventional name: Xinping Yi and Dai Autonomous County; Chinese: 新平彝族傣族自治县; pinyin: Xīnpíng Yízú Dǎizú Zìzhìxiàn)	新平县	Xīnpíng Xiàn	530427	XNP
Yuxi city 玉溪市; Yùxī Shì (5304 / YXS)	Yuanjiang County (Note: Conventional name: Yuanjiang Hani, Yi and Dai Autonomous County; Chinese: 元江哈尼族彝族傣族自治县; pinyin: Yuánjiāng Hānízú Yízú Dǎizú Zìzhìxiàn)	元江县	Yuánjiāng Xiàn	530428	YJA
Yuxi city 玉溪市; Yùxī Shì (5304 / YXS)	Chengjiang city	澄江市	Chéngjiāng shì	530481	
Baoshan city 保山市; Bǎoshān Shì (5305 / BOS)	Longyang District	隆阳区	Lóngyáng Qū	530502	LGU
Baoshan city 保山市; Bǎoshān Shì (5305 / BOS)	Shidian County	施甸县	Shīdiàn Xiàn	530521	SDD
Baoshan city 保山市; Bǎoshān Shì (5305 / BOS)	Longling County	龙陵县	Lónglíng Xiàn	530523	LGL
Baoshan city 保山市; Bǎoshān Shì (5305 / BOS)	Changning County	昌宁县	Chāngníng Xiàn	530524	CND
Baoshan city 保山市; Bǎoshān Shì (5305 / BOS)	Tengchong city	腾冲市	Téngchōng Shì	530581	TCT
Zhaotong city 昭通市; Zhāotōng Shì (5306 / ZTS)	Zhaoyang District	昭阳区	Zhāoyáng Qū	530602	ZGQ
Zhaotong city 昭通市; Zhāotōng Shì (5306 / ZTS)	Ludian County	鲁甸县	Lǔdiàn Xiàn	530621	LDX
Zhaotong city 昭通市; Zhāotōng Shì (5306 / ZTS)	Qiaojia County	巧家县	Qiǎojiā Xiàn	530622	QJA
Zhaotong city 昭通市; Zhāotōng Shì (5306 / ZTS)	Yanjin County	盐津县	Yánjīn Xiàn	530623	YJD
Zhaotong city 昭通市; Zhāotōng Shì (5306 / ZTS)	Daguan County	大关县	Dàguān Xiàn	530624	DGN
Zhaotong city 昭通市; Zhāotōng Shì (5306 / ZTS)	Yongshan County	永善县	Yǒngshàn Xiàn	530625	YSB
Zhaotong city 昭通市; Zhāotōng Shì (5306 / ZTS)	Suijiang County	绥江县	Suíjiāng Xiàn	530626	SUJ
Zhaotong city 昭通市; Zhāotōng Shì (5306 / ZTS)	Zhenxiong County	镇雄县	Zhènxióng Xiàn	530627	ZEX
Zhaotong city 昭通市; Zhāotōng Shì (5306 / ZTS)	Yiliang County	彝良县	Yíliáng Xiàn	530628	YLG
Zhaotong city 昭通市; Zhāotōng Shì (5306 / ZTS)	Weixin County	威信县	Wēixìn Xiàn	530629	WIX
Zhaotong city 昭通市; Zhāotōng Shì (5306 / ZTS)	Shuifu city	水富市	Shuǐfù Shì	530681	
Lijiang city 丽江市; Lìjiāng Shì (5307 / LJH)	Gucheng District	古城区	Gǔchéng Qū	530702	GUQ
Lijiang city 丽江市; Lìjiāng Shì (5307 / LJH)	Yulong County (Note: Conventional name: Yulong Naxi Autonomous County; Chinese: 玉龙纳西族自治县; pinyin: Yùlóng Nàxīzú Zìzhìxiàn)	玉龙县	Yùlóng Xiàn	530721	YLZ
Lijiang city 丽江市; Lìjiāng Shì (5307 / LJH)	Yongsheng County	永胜县	Yǒngshèng Xiàn	530722	YOS
Lijiang city 丽江市; Lìjiāng Shì (5307 / LJH)	Huaping County	华坪县	Huápíng Xiàn	530723	HAP
Lijiang city 丽江市; Lìjiāng Shì (5307 / LJH)	Ninglang County (Note: Conventional name: Ninglang Yi Autonomous County; Chinese: 宁蒗彝族自治县; pinyin: Nínglàng Yízú Zìzhìxiàn)	宁蒗县	Nínglàng Xiàn	530724	NLG
Pu'er city 普洱市; Pǔ'ěr Shì (5308 / PRS)	Simao District	思茅区	Sīmáo Qū	530802	SYM
Pu'er city 普洱市; Pǔ'ěr Shì (5308 / PRS)	Ning'er County (Note: Conventional name: Ning'er Hani and Yi Autonomous County; Chinese: 宁洱哈尼族彝族自治县; pinyin: Níng'ěr Hānízú Yízú Zìzhìxiàn)	宁洱县	Níng'ěr Xiàn	530821	NER
Pu'er city 普洱市; Pǔ'ěr Shì (5308 / PRS)	Mojiang County (Note: Conventional name: Mojiang Hani Autonomous County; Chinese: 墨江哈尼族自治县; pinyin: Mòjiāng Hānízú Zìzhìxiàn)	墨江县	Mòjiāng Xiàn	530822	MJG
Pu'er city 普洱市; Pǔ'ěr Shì (5308 / PRS)	Jingdong County (Note: Conventional name: Jingdong Yi Autonomous County; Chinese: 景东彝族自治县; pinyin: Jǐngdōng Yízú Zìzhìxiàn)	景东县	Jǐngdōng Xiàn	530823	JDD
Pu'er city 普洱市; Pǔ'ěr Shì (5308 / PRS)	Jinggu County (Note: Conventional name: Jinggu Dai and Yi Autonomous County; Chinese: 景谷傣族彝族自治县; pinyin: Jǐnggǔ Dǎizú Yízú Zìzhìxiàn)	景谷县	Jǐnggǔ Xiàn	530824	JGD
Pu'er city 普洱市; Pǔ'ěr Shì (5308 / PRS)	Zhenyuan County (Note: Conventional name: Zhenyuan Yi, Hani and Lahu Autonomous County; Chinese: 镇沅彝族哈尼族拉祜族自治县; pinyin: Zhènyuán Yízú Hānízú Lāhùzú Zìzhìxiàn)	镇沅县	Zhènyuán Xiàn	530825	ZYY
Pu'er city 普洱市; Pǔ'ěr Shì (5308 / PRS)	Jiangcheng County (Note: Conventional name: Jiangcheng Hani and Yi Autonomous County; Chinese: 江城哈尼族彝族自治县; pinyin: Jiāngchéng Hānízú Yízú Zìzhìxiàn)	江城县	Jiāngchéng Xiàn	530826	JCE
Pu'er city 普洱市; Pǔ'ěr Shì (5308 / PRS)	Menglian County (Note: Conventional name: Menglian Dai, Lahu and Va Autonomous County; Chinese: 孟连傣族拉祜族佤族自治县; pinyin: Mènglián Dǎizú Lāhùzú Wǎzú Zìzhìxiàn)	孟连县	Mènglián Xiàn	530827	MLN
Pu'er city 普洱市; Pǔ'ěr Shì (5308 / PRS)	Lancang County (Note: Conventional name: Lancang Lahu Autonomous County; Chinese: 澜沧拉祜族自治县; pinyin: Láncāng Lāhùzú Zìzhìxiàn)	澜沧县	Láncāng Xiàn	530828	LCA
Pu'er city 普洱市; Pǔ'ěr Shì (5308 / PRS)	Ximeng County (Note: Conventional name: Ximeng Va Autonomous County; Chinese: 西盟佤族自治县; pinyin: Xīméng Wǎzú Zìzhìxiàn)	西盟县	Xīméng Xiàn	530829	XMG
Lincang city 临沧市; Líncāng Shì (5309 / LIH)	Linxiang District	临翔区	Línxiáng Qū	530902	LXU
Lincang city 临沧市; Líncāng Shì (5309 / LIH)	Fengqing County	凤庆县	Fèngqìng Xiàn	530921	FQX
Lincang city 临沧市; Líncāng Shì (5309 / LIH)	Yunxian County (Note: Official name registered by the Ministry of Civil Affairs.)	云县	Yúnxiàn	530922	YXP
Lincang city 临沧市; Líncāng Shì (5309 / LIH)	Yongde County	永德县	Yǒngdé Xiàn	530923	YDX
Lincang city 临沧市; Líncāng Shì (5309 / LIH)	Zhenkang County	镇康县	Zhènkāng Xiàn	530924	ZKG
Lincang city 临沧市; Líncāng Shì (5309 / LIH)	Shuangjiang County (Note: Conventional name: Shuangjiang Lahu, Va, Blang and Dai Autonomous County; Chinese: 双江拉祜族佤族布朗族傣族自治县; pinyin: Shuāngjiāng Lāhùzú Wǎzú Bùlǎngzú ǎizú Zìzhìxiàn)	双江县	Shuāngjiāng Xiàn	530925	SGJ
Lincang city 临沧市; Líncāng Shì (5309 / LIH)	Gengma County (Note: Conventional name: Gengma Dai and Va Autonomous County; Chinese: 耿马傣族佤族自治县; pinyin: Gěngmǎ Dǎizú Wǎzú Zìzhìxiàn)	耿马县	Gěngmǎ Xiàn	530926	GMA
Lincang city 临沧市; Líncāng Shì (5309 / LIH)	Cangyuan County (Note: Conventional name: Cangyuan Va Autonomous County; Chinese: 沧源佤族自治县; pinyin: Cāngyuán Wǎzú Zìzhìxiàn)	沧源县	Cāngyuán Xiàn	530927	CYN
Chuxiong Prefecture (Note: Conventional name: Chuxiong Yi Autonomous Prefecture; Chinese: 楚雄彝族自治州; pinyin: Chǔxióng Yízú Zìzhìzhōu) 楚雄州; Chǔxióng Zhōu (5323 / CXD)	Chuxiong City	楚雄市	Chǔxióng Shì	532301	CXS
Chuxiong Prefecture 楚雄州; Chǔxióng Zhōu (5323 / CXD)	Lufeng City	禄丰市	Lùfēng Shì	532302	LFS
Chuxiong Prefecture 楚雄州; Chǔxióng Zhōu (5323 / CXD)	Shuangbai County	双柏县	Shuāngbǎi Xiàn	532322	SBA
Chuxiong Prefecture 楚雄州; Chǔxióng Zhōu (5323 / CXD)	Mouding County	牟定县	Móudìng Xiàn	532323	MDI
Chuxiong Prefecture 楚雄州; Chǔxióng Zhōu (5323 / CXD)	Nanhua County	南华县	Nánhuá Xiàn	532324	NHA
Chuxiong Prefecture 楚雄州; Chǔxióng Zhōu (5323 / CXD)	Yao'an County	姚安县	Yáo'ān Xiàn	532325	YOA
Chuxiong Prefecture 楚雄州; Chǔxióng Zhōu (5323 / CXD)	Dayao County	大姚县	Dàyáo Xiàn	532326	DYO
Chuxiong Prefecture 楚雄州; Chǔxióng Zhōu (5323 / CXD)	Yongren County	永仁县	Yǒngrén Xiàn	532327	YRN
Chuxiong Prefecture 楚雄州; Chǔxióng Zhōu (5323 / CXD)	Yuanmou County	元谋县	Yuánmóu Xiàn	532328	YMO
Chuxiong Prefecture 楚雄州; Chǔxióng Zhōu (5323 / CXD)	Wuding County	武定县	Wǔdìng Xiàn	532329	WDX
Honghe Prefecture (Note: Conventional name: Honghe Hani and Yi Autonomous Prefecture; Chinese: 红河哈尼族彝族自治州; pinyin: Hónghé Hānízú Yízú Zìzhìzhōu) 红河州; Hónghé Zhōu (5325 / HHZ)	Gejiu city	个旧市	Gèjiù Shì	532501	GJU
Honghe Prefecture 红河州; Hónghé Zhōu (5325 / HHZ)	Kaiyuan city	开远市	Kāiyuǎn Shì	532502	KYD
Honghe Prefecture 红河州; Hónghé Zhōu (5325 / HHZ)	Mengzi city	蒙自市	Měngzì Xiàn	532503	MEZ
Honghe Prefecture 红河州; Hónghé Zhōu (5325 / HHZ)	Mile city	弥勒市	Mílè Shì	532504	MLY
Honghe Prefecture 红河州; Hónghé Zhōu (5325 / HHZ)	Pingbian County (Note: Conventional name: Pingbian Miao Autonomous County; Chinese: 屏边苗族自治县; pinyin: Píngbiān Miáozú Zìzhìxiàn)	屏边县	Píngbiān Xiàn	532523	PBN
Honghe Prefecture 红河州; Hónghé Zhōu (5325 / HHZ)	Jianshui County	建水县	Jiànshuǐ Xiàn	532524	JSD
Honghe Prefecture 红河州; Hónghé Zhōu (5325 / HHZ)	Shiping County	石屏县	Shípíng Xiàn	532525	SPG
Honghe Prefecture 红河州; Hónghé Zhōu (5325 / HHZ)	Luxi County	泸西县	Lúxī Xiàn	532527	LXD
Honghe Prefecture 红河州; Hónghé Zhōu (5325 / HHZ)	Yuanyang County	元阳县	Yuányáng Xiàn	532528	YYD
Honghe Prefecture 红河州; Hónghé Zhōu (5325 / HHZ)	Honghe County	红河县	Hónghé Xiàn	532529	HHX
Honghe Prefecture 红河州; Hónghé Zhōu (5325 / HHZ)	Jinping County (Note: Conventional name: Jinping Miao, Yao and Dai Autonomous County; Chinese: 金平苗族瑶族傣族自治县; pinyin: Jīnpíng Miáozú Yáozú Dǎizú Zìzhìxiàn)	金平县	Jīnpíng Xiàn	532530	JNP
Honghe Prefecture 红河州; Hónghé Zhōu (5325 / HHZ)	Lüchun County	绿春县	Lǜchūn Xiàn	532531	LCX
Honghe Prefecture 红河州; Hónghé Zhōu (5325 / HHZ)	Hekou County (Note: Conventional name: Hekou Yao Autonomous County; Chinese: 河口瑶族自治县; pinyin: Hékǒu Yáozú Zìzhìxiàn)	河口县	Hékǒu Xiàn	532532	HKM
Wenshan Prefecture (Note: Conventional name: Wenshan Zhuang and Miao Autonomous Prefecture; Chinese: 文山壮族苗族自治州; pinyin: Wénshān Zhuàngzú Miáozú Zìzhìzhōu) 文山州; Wénshān Zhōu (5326 / WSZ)	Wenshan city	文山市	Wénshān Xiàn	532601	WSB
Wenshan Prefecture 文山州; Wénshān Zhōu (5326 / WSZ)	Yanshan County	砚山县	Yànshān Xiàn	532622	YSD
Wenshan Prefecture 文山州; Wénshān Zhōu (5326 / WSZ)	Xichou County	西畴县	Xīchóu Xiàn	532623	XIC
Wenshan Prefecture 文山州; Wénshān Zhōu (5326 / WSZ)	Malipo County	麻栗坡县	Málìpō Xiàn	532624	MLP
Wenshan Prefecture 文山州; Wénshān Zhōu (5326 / WSZ)	Maguan County	马关县	Mǎguān Xiàn	532625	MGN
Wenshan Prefecture 文山州; Wénshān Zhōu (5326 / WSZ)	Qiubei County	丘北县	Qiūběi Xiàn	532626	QBE
Wenshan Prefecture 文山州; Wénshān Zhōu (5326 / WSZ)	Guangnan County	广南县	Guǎngnán Xiàn	532627	GGN
Wenshan Prefecture 文山州; Wénshān Zhōu (5326 / WSZ)	Funing County	富宁县	Fùníng Xiàn	532628	FND
Xishuangbanna Prefecture (Note: Conventional name: Xishuangbanna Dai Autonomous Prefecture; Chinese: 西双版纳傣族自治州; pinyin: Xīshuāngbǎnnà Dǎizú Zìzhìzhōu) 西双版纳州; Xīshuāngbǎnnà Zhōu (5328 / XSB)	Jinghong city	景洪市	Jǐnghóng Shì	532801	JHG
Xishuangbanna Prefecture 西双版纳州; Xīshuāngbǎnnà Zhōu (5328 / XSB)	Menghai County	勐海县	Měnghǎi Xiàn	532822	MHI
Xishuangbanna Prefecture 西双版纳州; Xīshuāngbǎnnà Zhōu (5328 / XSB)	Mengla County	勐腊县	Měnglà Xiàn	532823	MLA
Dali Prefecture (Note: Conventional name: Dali Bai Autonomous Prefecture; Chinese: 大理白族自治州; pinyin: Dàlǐ Báizú Zìzhìzhōu) 大理州; Dàlǐ Zhōu (5329 / DLZ)	Dali city	大理市	Dàlǐ Shì	532901	DLS
Dali Prefecture 大理州; Dàlǐ Zhōu (5329 / DLZ)	Yangbi County (Note: Conventional name: Yangbi Yi Autonomous County; Chinese: 漾濞彝族自治县; pinyin: Yàngbì Yízú Zìzhìxiàn)	漾濞县	Yàngbì Xiàn	532922	YGB
Dali Prefecture 大理州; Dàlǐ Zhōu (5329 / DLZ)	Xiangyun County	祥云县	Xiángyún Xiàn	532923	XYD
Dali Prefecture 大理州; Dàlǐ Zhōu (5329 / DLZ)	Binchuan County	宾川县	Bīnchuān Xiàn	532924	BCD
Dali Prefecture 大理州; Dàlǐ Zhōu (5329 / DLZ)	Midu County	弥渡县	Mídù Xiàn	532925	MDU
Dali Prefecture 大理州; Dàlǐ Zhōu (5329 / DLZ)	Nanjian County (Note: Conventional name: Nanjian Yi Autonomous County; Chinese: 南涧彝族自治县; pinyin: Nánjiàn Yízú Zìzhìxiàn)	南涧县	Nánjiàn Xiàn	532926	NNJ
Dali Prefecture 大理州; Dàlǐ Zhōu (5329 / DLZ)	Weishan County (Note: Conventional name: Weishan Yi and Hui Autonomous County; Chinese: 巍山彝族回族自治县; pinyin: Wēishān Yízú Huízú Zìzhìxiàn)	巍山县	Wēishān Xiàn	532927	WSY
Dali Prefecture 大理州; Dàlǐ Zhōu (5329 / DLZ)	Yongping County	永平县	Yǒngpíng Xiàn	532928	YPX
Dali Prefecture 大理州; Dàlǐ Zhōu (5329 / DLZ)	Yunlong County	云龙县	Yúnlóng Xiàn	532929	YLO
Dali Prefecture 大理州; Dàlǐ Zhōu (5329 / DLZ)	Eryuan County	洱源县	Ěryuán Xiàn	532930	EYN
Dali Prefecture 大理州; Dàlǐ Zhōu (5329 / DLZ)	Jianchuan County	剑川县	Jiànchuān Xiàn	532931	JIC
Dali Prefecture 大理州; Dàlǐ Zhōu (5329 / DLZ)	Heqing County	鹤庆县	Hèqìng Xiàn	532932	HQG
Dehong Prefecture (Note: Conventional name: Dehong Dai and Jingpo Autonomous Prefecture; Chinese: 德宏傣族景颇族自治州; pinyin: Déhóng Dǎizú Jǐngpōzú Zìzhìzhōu) 德宏州; Déhóng Zhōu (5331 / DHG)	Ruili city	瑞丽市	Ruìlì Shì	533102	RUI
Dehong Prefecture 德宏州; Déhóng Zhōu (5331 / DHG)	Mangshi city	芒市	Mángshì	533103	MAB
Dehong Prefecture 德宏州; Déhóng Zhōu (5331 / DHG)	Lianghe County	梁河县	Liánghé Xiàn	533122	LHD
Dehong Prefecture 德宏州; Déhóng Zhōu (5331 / DHG)	Yingjiang County	盈江县	Yíngjiāng Xiàn	533123	YGL
Dehong Prefecture 德宏州; Déhóng Zhōu (5331 / DHG)	Longchuan County	陇川县	Lǒngchuān Xiàn	533124	LCN
Nujiang Prefecture (Note: Conventional name: Nujiang Lisu Autonomous Prefecture; Chinese: 怒江傈僳族自治州; pinyin: Nùjiāng Lìsùzú Zìzhìzhōu) 怒江州; Nùjiāng Zhōu (5333 / NUJ)	Lushui city	泸水市	Lúshuǐ Shì	533302	LMS
Nujiang Prefecture 怒江州; Nùjiāng Zhōu (5333 / NUJ)	Fugong County	福贡县	Fúgòng Xiàn	533323	FGO
Nujiang Prefecture 怒江州; Nùjiāng Zhōu (5333 / NUJ)	Gongshan County (Note: Conventional name: Gongshan Derung and Nu Autonomous County; Chinese: 贡山独龙族怒族自治县; pinyin: Gòngshān Dúlóngzú Nùzú Zìzhìxiàn)	贡山县	Gòngshān Xiàn	533324	GSN
Nujiang Prefecture 怒江州; Nùjiāng Zhōu (5333 / NUJ)	Lanping County (Note: Conventional name: Lanping Bai and Pumi Autonomous County; Chinese: 兰坪白族普米族自治县; pinyin: Lánpíng Báizú Pǔmǐzú Zìzhìxiàn)	兰坪县	Lánpíng Xiàn	533325	LPG
Dêqên (Diqing) Prefecture (Note: Conventional name: Dêqên Tibetan Autonomous Prefecture; Chinese: 迪庆藏族自治州; pinyin: Díqìng Zàngzú Zìzhìzhōu) 迪庆州; Díqìng Zhōu (5334 / DEZ)	Xianggelila city	香格里拉市	Xiānggélǐlā Shì	533401	SEL
Dêqên (Diqing) Prefecture 迪庆州; Díqìng Zhōu (5334 / DEZ)	Deqin County	德钦县	Déqīn Xiàn	533422	DQN
Dêqên (Diqing) Prefecture 迪庆州; Díqìng Zhōu (5334 / DEZ)	Weixi County (Note: Conventional name: Weixi Lisu Autonomous County; Chinese: 维西傈僳族自治县; pinyin: Wéixī Lìsùzú Zìzhìxiàn)	维西县	Wéixī Xiàn	533423	WXI

== Recent changes in administrative divisions ==
Date	Before	After	Note	Reference
1981-01-18	parts of Zhaotong County	Zhaotong (PC-City)	established	
1981-05-09	parts of Pu'er County	Simao County	established	
1981-08-14	Shuifu (CC-District)	Shuifu County	reorganized	
1981-08-14	parts of Yanjin County	Shuifu County	merged into	
1981-08-14	parts of Suijiang County	Shuifu County	merged into	
1981-11-18	Kaiyuan County	Kaiyuan (PC-City)	reorganized	
1983-01-18	all Province-controlled city (P-City) → Prefecture-level city (PL-City)			Civil Affairs Announcement
1983-01-18	all Prefecture-controlled city/town (PC-City/Town) → County-level city/town (CL-City/Town)			Civil Affairs Announcement
1983-09-09	parts of Qujing Prefecture	Kunming (PL-City)	transferred	
1983-09-09	↳ Yiliang County	↳ Yiliang County	transferred	
1983-09-09	↳ Songming County	↳ Songming County	transferred	
1983-09-09	↳ Lunan County (Aut.)	↳ Lunan County (Aut.)	transferred	
1983-09-09	parts of Chuxiong Prefecture (Aut.)	Kunming (PL-City)	transferred	
1983-09-09	↳ Luquan County	↳ Luquan County	transferred	
1983-09-09	Zhaotong County	Zhaotong (CL-City)	merged into	
1983-09-09	Qujing County	Qujing (CL-City)	reorganized	
1983-09-09	Zhanyi County	Qujing (CL-City)	merged into	
1983-09-09	Yuxi County	Yuxi (CL-City)	reorganized	
1983-09-09	Baoshan County	Baoshan (CL-City)	reorganized	
1983-09-09	Dali County	Dali (CL-City)	reorganized	
1983-09-09	Xiaguan (CL-City)	Dali (CL-City)	merged into	
1985-01-31	Wanding (CL-Town)	Wanding (CL-City)	reorganized	
1985-06-11	Shuangjiang County	Shuangjiang County (Aut.)	reorganized	
1985-06-11	Weixi County	Weixi County (Aut.)	reorganized	
1985-06-11	Jingdong County	Jingdong County (Aut.)	reorganized	
1985-06-11	Jinggu County	Jinggu County (Aut.)	reorganized	
1985-06-11	Pu'er County	Pu'er County (Aut.)	reorganized	
1985-06-11	Yangbi County	Yangbi County (Aut.)	reorganized	
1985-06-11	Luquan County	Luquan County (Aut.)	reorganized	
1985-06-11	Jinping County	Jinping County (Aut.)	reorganized	
1986-09-24	Bijiang County	Lushui County	disestablished & merged into	
1986-09-24	Bijiang County	Fugong County	disestablished & merged into	
1987-11-27	Lanping County	Lanping County (aut.)	reorganized	
1990-02-03	Zhenyuan County	Zhenyuan County (Aut.)	reorganized	
1992-06-26	Ruili County	Ruili (CL-City)	reorganized	Civil Affairs [1992]69
1993-03-25	Simao County	Simao (CL-City)	reorganized	Civil Affairs [1993]61
1993-12-22	Jinghong County	Jinghong (CL-City)	reorganized	Civil Affairs [1993]256
1994-02-18	Xuanwei County	Xuanwei (CL-City)	reorganized	
1995-10-13	Anning County	Anning (CL-City)	reorganized	
1996-10-28	Luxi County	Luxi (CL-City)	reorganized	Civil Affairs [1996]80
1997-05-06	Qujing Prefecture	Qujing (PL-City)	reorganized	State Council [1997]32
1997-05-06	Qujing (CL-City)	Qilin District	disestablished & established	State Council [1997]32
1997-05-06	Qujing (CL-City)	Zhanyi County	disestablished & established	State Council [1997]32
1997-12-13	Yuxi Prefecture	Yuxi (PL-City)	reorganized	State Council [1997]108
1997-12-13	Yuxi (CL-City)	Hongta District	disestablished & established	State Council [1997]108
1998-10-08	Lunan County (Aut.)	Shilin County (Aut.)	renamed	
1998-12-06	Dongchuan (PL-City)	Kunming (PL-City)	disestablished & merged into	
1998-12-06	Dongchuan (PL-City)	↳ Dongchuan District	reorganized & transferred	
1998-12-06	parts of Qujing (CL-City)	Kunming (PL-City)	transferred	
1998-12-06	↳ Xundian County (Aut.)	↳ Xundian County (Aut.)	transferred	
1999-01-02	Wanding (CL-City)	Ruili (CL-City)	merged into	State Council [1999]1
2000-12-30	Baoshan Prefecture	Baoshan (PL-City)	reorganized	
2000-12-30	Baoshan (CL-City)	Longyang District	reorganized	
2001-01-30	Zhaotong Prefecture	Zhaotong (PL-City)	reorganized	State Council [2001]6
2001-01-30	Zhaotong (CL-City)	Zhaoyang District	reorganized	State Council [2001]6
2001-12-17	Zhongdian County	Xianggelila County	renamed	Civil Affairs [2001]348
2002-12-26	Lijiang Prefecture	Lijiang (PL-City)	reorganized	State Council [2002]122
2002-12-26	Lijiang (CL-City)	Gucheng District	reorganized	State Council [2002]122
2002-12-26	Lijiang County (Aut.)	Yulong County (Aut.)	renamed	State Council [2002]122
2003-10-30	Simao Prefecture	Simao (PL-City)	reorganized	State Council [2003]113
2003-10-30	Simao (CL-City)	Cuiyun District	reorganized	State Council [2003]113
2003-10-30	Lincang Prefecture	Lincang (PL-City)	reorganized	State Council [2003]136
2003-10-30	Lincang (CL-City)	Linxiang District	reorganized	State Council [2003]136
2007-01-21	Simao (PL-City)	Pu'er (PL-City)	renamed	State Council [2007]8
2007-01-21	Cuiyun District	Simao District	renamed	State Council [2007]8
2007-01-21	Pu'er County (Aut.)	Ning'er County (Aut.)	renamed	State Council [2007]8
2010-07-20	Luxi (CL-City)	Mangshi (CL-City)	renamed	State Council [2010]166
2010-09-10	Mengzi County	Mengzi (CL-City)	reorganized	Civil Affairs [2010]219
2010-12-02	Wenshan County	Wenshan (CL-City)	reorganized	Civil Affairs [2010]295
2011-05-20	Chenggong County	Chenggong District	reorganized	State Council [2011]58
2013-01-24	Mile County	Mile (CL-City)	reorganized	Civil Affairs [2013]29
2014-12-16	Xianggelila County	Xianggelila (CL-City)	reorganized	Civil Affairs [2014]375
2015-08-01	Tengchong County	Tengchong (CL-City)	reorganized	Civil Affairs [2015]248
2015-12-03	Jiangchuan County	Jiangchuan District	reorganized	State Council [2015]208
2016-03-20	Zhanyi County	Zhanyi District	reorganized	State Council [2016]54
2016-06-16	Lushui County	Lushui (CL-City)	reorganized	Civil Affairs [2016]176
2016-11-24	Jinning County	Jinning District	reorganized	State Council [2016]187
2018-02-09	Malong County	Malong District	reorganized	State Council [2018]24
2018-07-02	Shuifu County	Shuifu (CL-City)	reorganized	Civil Affairs [2018]108
2019-11-20	Chengjiang County	Chengjiang (CL-City)	reorganized	Civil Affairs [2019]124

== Population composition ==
=== Prefectures ===
Prefecture	2010	2000
Kunming	6,432,212	5,781,294
Qujing	5,855,055	5,466,100
Yuxi	2,303,511	2,073,005
Baoshan	2,506,491	2,348,315
Zhaotong	5,213,533	4,592,388
Lijiang	1,244,769	1,126,646
Pu'er	2,542,898	2,395,248
Lincang	2,429,505	2,228,785
Dehong	1,211,440	1,071,300
Nujiang	534,337	491,824
Dêqên (Diqing)	400,182	353,518
Dali	3,456,000	3,297,000
Chuxiong	2,684,174	2,542,465
Honghe	4,501,000	4,130,500
Wenshan	3,517,941	3,268,553
Xishuangbanna	1,133,515	993,397

=== Counties ===
Name	Prefecture	2010
Wuhua	Kunming	855,521
Panlong	Kunming	809,881
Guandu	Kunming	853,371
Xishan	Kunming	753,813
Dongchuan	Kunming	271,917
Chenggong	Kunming	310,843
Jinning	Kunming	283,784
Fumin	Kunming	145,554
Yiliang	Kunming	419,400
Songming	Kunming	287,095
Shilin	Kunming	246,220
Luquan	Kunming	396,404
Xundian	Kunming	457,068
Anning	Kunming	341,341
Qilin	Qujing	740,747
Malong	Qujing	184,989
Luliang	Qujing	622,397
Shizong	Qujing	392,361
Luoping	Qujing	549,680
Fuyuan	Qujing	722,640
Huize	Qujing	908,292
Zhanyi	Qujing	431,058
Xuanwei	Qujing	1,302,891
Hongta	Yuxi	495,129
Jiangchuan	Yuxi	280,889
Chengjiang	Yuxi	169,366
Tonghai	Yuxi	300,800
Huaning	Yuxi	214,650
Yimen	Yuxi	177,110
Eshan	Yuxi	162,831
Xinping	Yuxi	285,344
Yuanjiang	Yuxi	217,392
Longyang	Baoshan	935,618
Shidian	Baoshan	305,223
Tengchong	Baoshan	644,765
Longling	Baoshan	277,319
Changning	Baoshan	343,566
Zhaoyang	Zhaotong	787,845
Ludian	Zhaotong	390,654
Qiaojia	Zhaotong	516,349
Yanjin	Zhaotong	369,881
Daguan	Zhaotong	263,225
Yongshan	Zhaotong	394,267
Suijiang	Zhaotong	153,091
Zhenxiong	Zhaotong	1,328,375
Yiliang	Zhaotong	521,838
Weixin	Zhaotong	385,865
Shuifu	Zhaotong	102,143
Gucheng	Lijiang	211,151
Yulong	Lijiang	214,697
Yongsheng	Lijiang	392,024
Huaping	Lijiang	168,028
Ninglang	Lijiang	258,869
Simao	Pu'er	296,500
Ning'er	Pu'er	185,700
Mojiang	Pu'er	360,500
Jingdong	Pu'er	359,500
Jinggu	Pu'er	291,700
Zhenyuan	Pu'er	208,600
Jiangcheng	Pu'er	121,500
Menglian	Pu'er	135,500
Lancang	Pu'er	491,900
Ximeng	Pu'er	91,300
Linxiang	Lincang	323,708
Fengqing	Lincang	458,330
Yun(xian)	Lincang	449,460
Yongde	Lincang	369,702
Zhenkang	Lincang	176,356
Shuangjiang	Lincang	176,549
Gengma	Lincang	296,302
Cangyuan	Lincang	179,098
Chuxiong	Chuxiong	588,620
Shuangbai	Chuxiong	159,867
Mouding	Chuxiong	208,726
Nanhua	Chuxiong	236,138
Yao'an	Chuxiong	197,676
Dayao	Chuxiong	273,315
Yongren	Chuxiong	109,304
Yuanmou	Chuxiong	215,795
Wuding	Chuxiong	271,963
Lufeng	Chuxiong	422,770
Mengzi	Honghe	417,200
Gejiu	Honghe	459,800
Kaiyuan	Honghe	322,700
Mile	Honghe	539,700
Shiping	Honghe	299,100
Jianshui	Honghe	531,500
Luxi(xian)	Honghe	400,700
Yuanyang	Honghe	396,800
Honghe	Honghe	296,500
Lüchun	Honghe	222,200
Pingbian	Honghe	154,000
Jinping	Honghe	356,200
Hekou	Honghe	104,600
Wenshan	Wenshan	481,504
Yanshan	Wenshan	463,264
Xichou	Wenshan	255,286
Malipo	Wenshan	277,960
Maguan	Wenshan	367,507
Qiubei	Wenshan	477,441
Guangnan	Wenshan	787,449
Funing	Wenshan	407,530
Jinghong	Xishuangbanna	519,935
Menghai	Xishuangbanna	331,850
Mengla	Xishuangbanna	281,730
Dali	Dali	652,000
Xiangyun	Dali	456,000
Binchuan	Dali	349,000
Midu	Dali	313,000
Yongping	Dali	175,000
Yunlong	Dali	200,000
Eryuan	Dali	268,000
Jianchuan	Dali	170,000
Heqing	Dali	255,000
Yangbi	Dali	102,000
Nanjian	Dali	212,000
Weishan	Dali	304,000
Ruili	Dehong	180,627
Luxi(shi) → Mangshi	Dehong	389,891
Lianghe	Dehong	154,175
Yingjiang	Dehong	305,167
Longchuan	Dehong	181,580
Lushui	Nujiang	184,835
Fugong	Nujiang	98,616
Gongshan	Nujiang	37,894
Lanping	Nujiang	212,992
Xianggelila	Dêqên	172,988
Diqin	Dêqên	66,589
Weixi to	Dêqên	160,605

== List of autonomous subdivisions by ethnic group ==
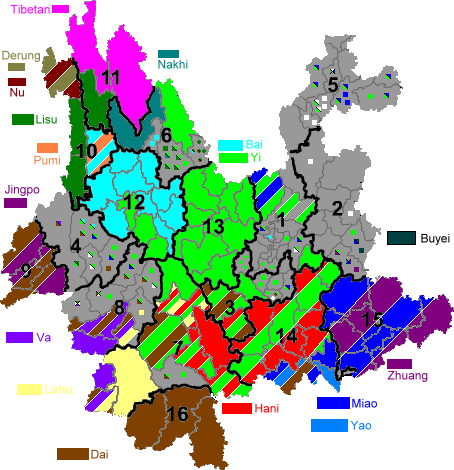
Major Autonomous areas within Yunnan. (excluding Hui)

There are 29 autonomous counties and 8 autonomous prefectures assigned to 18 different ethnic minorities in Yunnan.

Yi (15 counties, 2 prefectures)

- Shilin Yi Autonomous County, Kunming
- Luquan Yi and Miao Autonomous County, Kunming
- Xundian Hui and Yi Autonomous County, Kunming
- Eshan Yi Autonomous County, Yuxi
- Xinping Yi and Dai Autonomous County, Yuxi
- Yuanjiang Hani, Yi and Dai Autonomous County, Yuxi
- Ninglang Yi Autonomous County, Lijiang
- Ning'er Hani and Yi Autonomous County, Pu'er
- Jingdong Yi Autonomous County, Pu'er
- Jinggu Dai and Yi Autonomous County, Pu'er
- Zhenyuan Yi, Hani and Lahu Autonomous County, Pu'er
- Jiangcheng Hani and Yi Autonomous County, Pu'er
- Yangbi Yi Autonomous County, Dali
- Nanjian Yi Autonomous County, Dali
- Weishan Yi and Hui Autonomous County, Dali
- Chuxiong Yi Autonomous Prefecture
- Honghe Hani and Yi Autonomous Prefecture

Hui (2 counties)

- Xundian Hui and Yi Autonomous County, Kunming
- Weishan Yi and Hui Autonomous County, Dali

Miao (3 counties, 1 prefecture)

- Luquan Yi and Miao Autonomous County
- Jinping Miao, Yao and Dai Autonomous County, Honghe
- Pingbian Miao Autonomous County, Honghe
- Wenshan Zhuang and Miao Autonomous Prefecture

Yao (2 counties)

- Jinping Miao, Yao and Dai Autonomous County, Honghe
- Hekou Yao Autonomous County, Honghe

Zhuang (1 prefecture)

- Wenshan Zhuang and Miao Autonomous Prefecture

Dai (6 counties, 2 prefectures)

- Xinping Yi and Dai Autonomous County, Yuxi
- Yuanjiang Hani, Yi and Dai Autonomous County, Yuxi
- Jinggu Dai and Yi Autonomous County, Pu'er
- Menglian Dai, Lahu and Va Autonomous County, Pu'er
- Gengma Dai and Va Autonomous County, Lincang
- Dehong Dai and Jingpo Autonomous Prefecture
- Jinping Miao, Yao and Dai Autonomous County, Honghe
- Xishuangbanna Dai Autonomous Prefecture

Lahu (4 counties)

- Zhenyuan Yi, Hani and Lahu Autonomous County, Pu'er
- Menglian Dai, Lahu and Va Autonomous County, Pu'er
- Lancang Lahu Autonomous County, Pu'er
- Shuangjiang Lahu, Va, Blang and Dai Autonomous County, Lincang

Hani (5 counties, 1 prefecture)

- Yuanjiang Hani, Yi and Dai Autonomous County, Yuxi
- Ning'er Hani and Yi Autonomous County, Pu'er
- Mojiang Hani Autonomous County, Pu'er
- Zhenyuan Yi, Hani and Lahu Autonomous County, Pu'er
- Jiangcheng Hani and Yi Autonomous County, Pu'er
- Honghe Hani and Yi Autonomous Prefecture

Wa (5 counties)

- Menglian Dai, Lahu and Va Autonomous County, Pu'er
- Ximeng Va Autonomous County, Pu'er
- Shuangjiang Lahu, Va, Blang and Dai Autonomous County, Lincang
- Gengma Dai and Va Autonomous County, Lincang
- Cangyuan Va Autonomous County, Lincang

Bulang (1 county)

- Shuangjiang Lahu, Va, Blang and Dai Autonomous County, Lincang

Jingpo (1 prefecture)

- Dehong Dai and Jingpo Autonomous Prefecture

Bai (1 county, 1 prefecture)

- Lanping Bai and Pumi Autonomous County, Nujiang
- Dali Bai Autonomous Prefecture

Lisu (1 county, 1 prefecture)

- Nujiang Lisu Autonomous Prefecture
- Weixi Lisu Autonomous County, Dêqên

Naxi (1 county)

- Yulong Naxi Autonomous County, Lijiang

Pumi (1 county)

- Lanping Bai and Pumi Autonomous County, Nujiang

Dulong (1 county)

- Gongshan Derung and Nu Autonomous County, Nujiang

Nu (1 county)

- Gongshan Derung and Nu Autonomous County, Nujiang

Tibetan (1 prefecture)

- Dêqên Tibetan Autonomous Prefecture
