= Ding Wei (Go player) =

Chinese professional Go player

Ding Wei 丁伟
Personal information
- Native name: Trad. 丁偉 Simp. 丁伟 (Chinese); Dīng Wěi (Pinyin)
- Full name: Ding Wei
- Born: May 16, 1979 (age 47) Nanhua County, Chuxiong, Yunnan, China

Sport
- Turned pro: 1992
- Rank: 9 dan
- Affiliation: Chinese Weiqi Association

Ding Wei (simplified Chinese: 丁伟; traditional Chinese: 丁偉; pinyin: Dīng Wěi, born 16 May 1979 ~ , in Nanhua County, Chuxiong, Yunnan) is a Chinese professional Go player.

== Biography ==
In 1992, Ding became a professional. He advanced a rank every year until 2001, when he reached 8 dan. After six years, he reached his current rank of 9 dan.

In 1997, Ding won his first title, the National Go Individual. His second and latest title came in 2000, when he won the CCTV Cup.

== Past titles and runners-up ==
Title	Years Held
Current	2
(China) CCTV Cup	2000
(China) National Go Individual	1997

Title	Years Lost
Current	5
(China) Xinan Wang	2003, 2000
(China) CCTV Cup	2002
(China) Tianyuan	2001
(China) National Go Individual	1999
