= Xinqiao, Yunnan =

Xinqiao 新桥镇
- Town
- Location in Yunnan
- Coordinates: 25°21′28″N 101°35′29″E
- Country: People's Republic of China
- Province: Yunnan
- Autonomous prefecture: Chuxiong
- County: Mouding
- Elevation: 1,789 m (5,869 ft)
- Time zone: UTC+8 (China Standard)

Xinqiao (simplified Chinese: 新桥; traditional Chinese: 新橋; pinyin: Xīnqiáo; lit. 'new bridge') is a town of Mouding County in north-central Yunnan province, China, located 6 kilometres (3.7 mi) northeast of the county seat and 35 km (22 mi) north-northeast of Chuxiong City. As of 2011, it has 15 villages under its administration.
