= Longchuan =

Longchuan may refer to the following locations in the People's Republic of China:

- Longchuan County, Guangdong (龙川县), of Heyuan City
- Longchuan County, Yunnan (陇川县), of Dehong Prefecture
- Longchuan, Baise (龙川镇), town in Youjiang District, Baise, Guangxi
- Longchuan, Nanhua County (龙川镇), town in Nanhua County, Yunnan

== See also ==
- Longquan, Zhejiang, Lung-ch'üan in Wade–Giles
