= 2009 Yunnan earthquake =

Earthquake in China

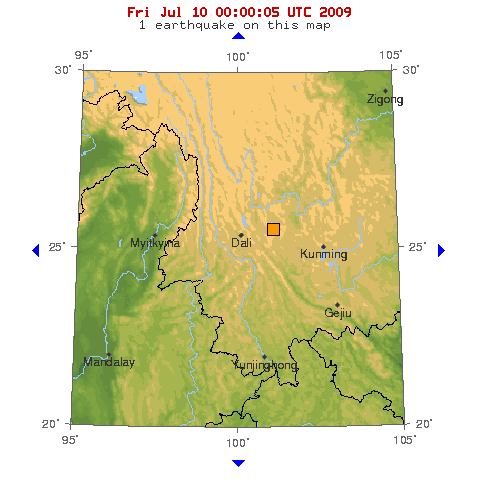
- UTC time: 2009-07-09 11:19:17
- ISC event: 13380449
- USGS-ANSS: ComCat
- Local date: July 9, 2009
- Local time: 19:19:17 CST
- Magnitude: 5.7 M_{w}
- Depth: 10 kilometres (6.2 mi)
- Epicenter: 25°37′08″N 101°05′10″E
- Areas affected: China
- Casualties: 1 killed, 336 injured.

An earthquake with a moment magnitude of 5.7 occurred in Yao'an County, Yunnan province, People's Republic of China on 9 July 2009. At least one person died and over 300 were injured, with over 50 of these sustaining serious injuries.

== Background and tectonics ==
At 11:19 UTC (19:19 local time), a magnitude 5.7 earthquake with an epicentre at 25°37′08″N 101°05′10″E occurred. The epicentre was in Guantun, 200 kilometres (120 mi) from the province's capital Kunming and 98 kilometres (61 mi) east north east of Dali. The depth of the event was 10 kilometres (6.2 mi). Eight aftershocks were recorded. A magnitude 5.0 aftershock occurred on July 10 at 09:02:04 UTC (17:02:04 local time). Its epicentre was located at 25°37′37″N 100°56′56″E. In total, there were over 8 aftershocks.

== Damage and casualties ==
The earthquake destroyed 10,000 houses and damaged a further 30,000. One person died and over 300 people were injured, with over 50 suffering serious injuries. Yunnan province's civil affairs department was dispatching 4,500 tents, and 3,000 quilts as part of the disaster relief efforts. Also, a coal mine collapsed in the epicentral area within 50 miles.

== See also ==
- List of earthquakes in 2009
- List of earthquakes in China
