= Shuifu =

Coordinates: 28°37′59″N 104°25′05″E

Shuifu 水富市
- County-level city
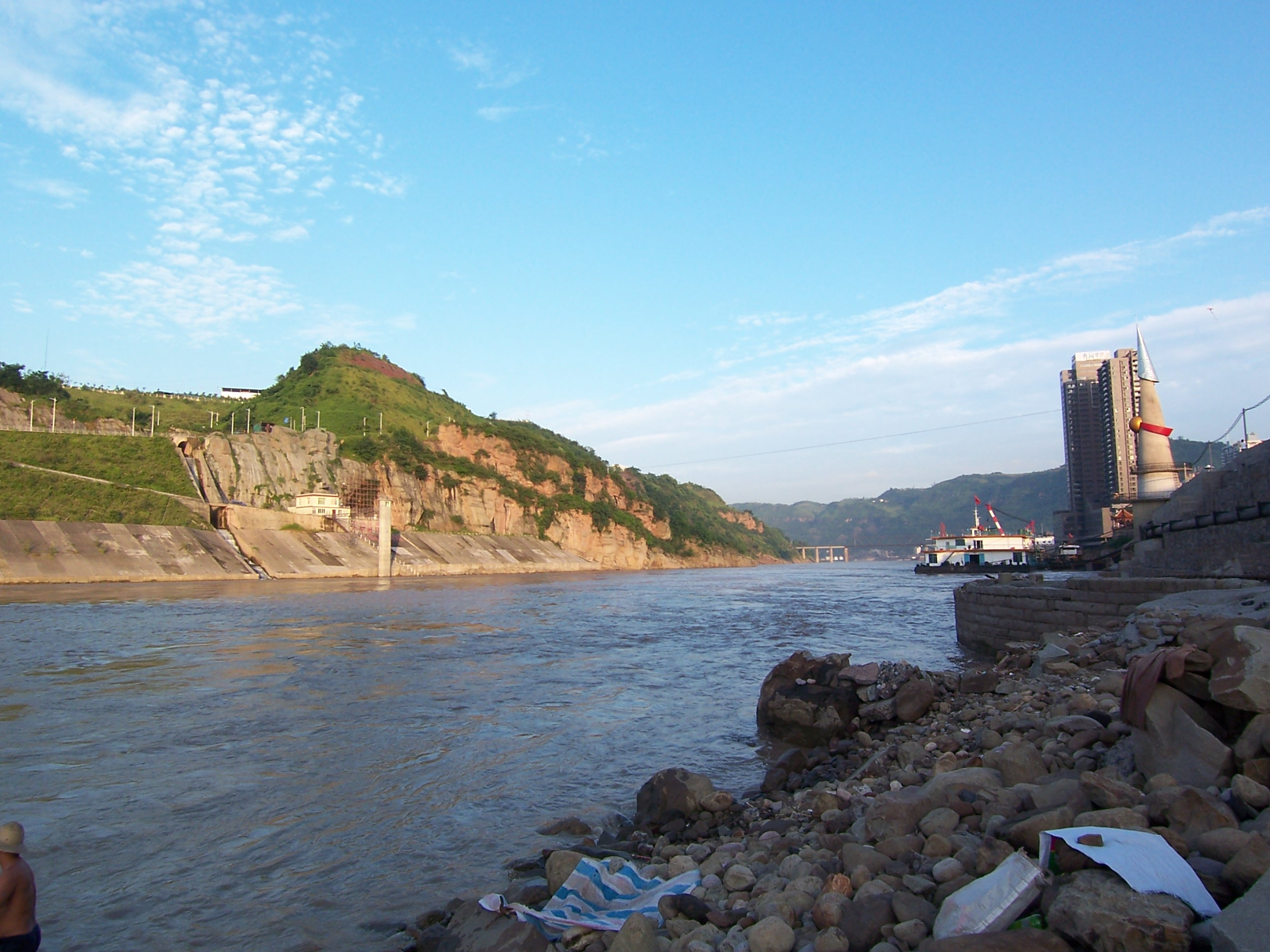

- Location of Shuifu County (red) and Zhaotong City (pink) within Yunnan
- Country: People's Republic of China
- Province: Yunnan
- Prefecture-level city: Zhaotong

Area
  - Total: 319 km^{2} (123 sq mi)

Population
  - Total: 91,123
  - Density: 286/km^{2} (740/sq mi)
- Time zone: UTC+8 (CST)
- Postal code: 657800
- Area code: 0870
- Website: shuifu.mofcom.gov.cn

Shuifu (Chinese: 水富市; pinyin: Shuǐfù Shì) is a county-level city under the jurisdiction of the prefecture-level city of Zhaotong, in the northeast of Yunnan province, China, bordering Sichuan to the east and northeast across the Jinsha River.

== History ==
Shuifu has only 25 years of history. It used to belong to Sichuan province, but it is now in Yunnan province.

== Administrative divisions ==
Shuifu City has 1 subdistrict and 3 towns.

1 subdistrict

- Yunfu (云富街道)

3 towns

- Xiangjiaba (向家坝镇)
- Taiping (太平镇)
- Liangwan (两碗镇)

== Agriculture ==
Rice, corn, pears.

== Transportation ==
There is a train-station outside the town itself. The Jinsha River passes by it. Many roads are connected to the town, and a huge freeway was under construction in 2006.
