= Dayao County =

Dayao County 大姚县
- County
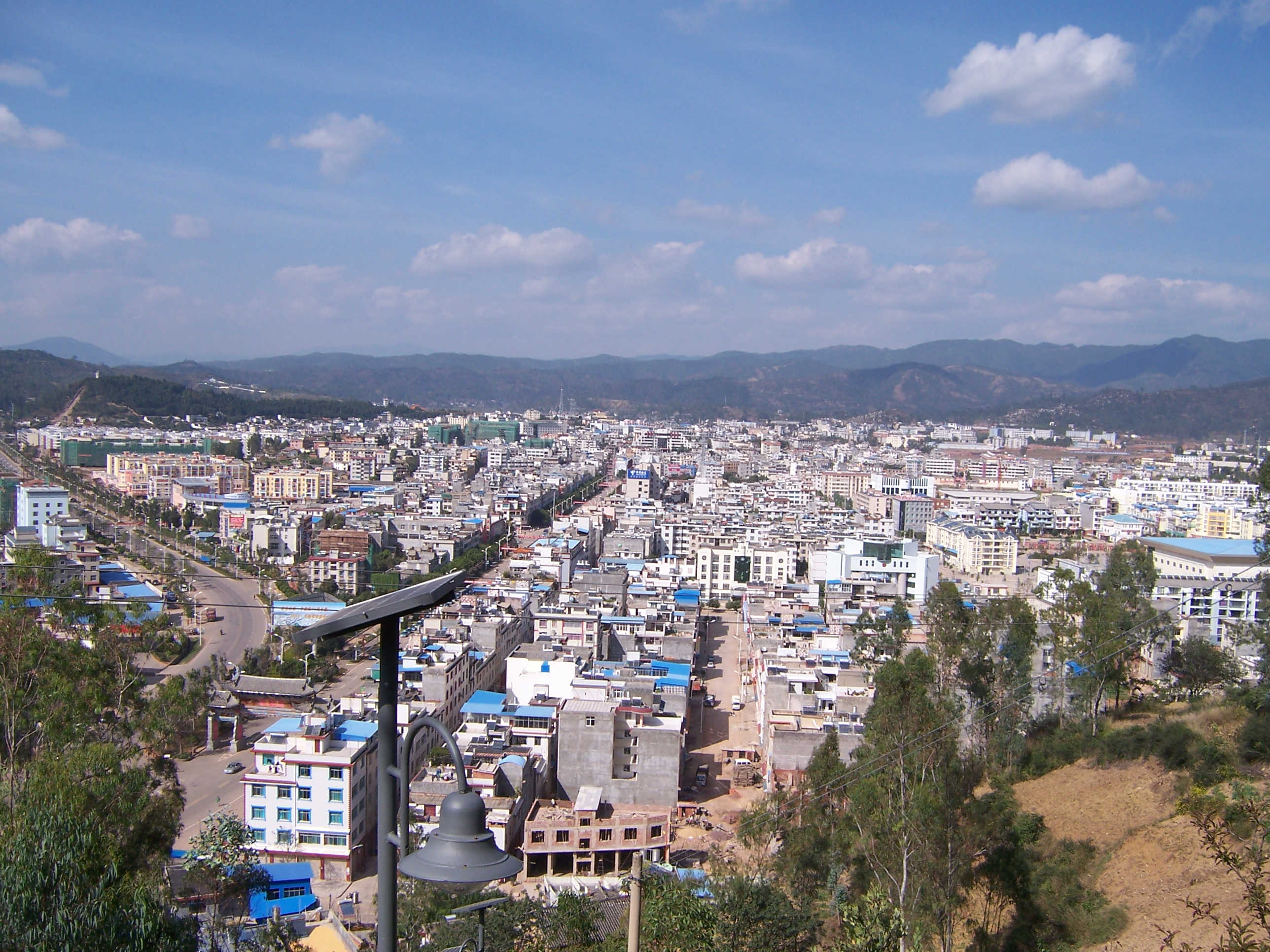
- Urban skyline of Dayao

- Location of Dayao County in Chuxiong Prefecture within Yunnan province

- Location of the county seat in Yunnan
- Coordinates: 25°43′N 101°19′E
- Country: People's Republic of China
- Province: Yunnan
- Prefecture: Chuxiong

Area
  - Total: 4,146 km^{2} (1,601 sq mi)
- Elevation: 1,862 m (6,109 ft)

Population
  - Total: 280,000
  - Density: 68/km^{2} (170/sq mi)
- Time zone: UTC+8 (China Standard)
- Postal code: 675400
- Area code: 0878
- Website: dayao.gov.cn

Dayao County (simplified Chinese: 大姚县; traditional Chinese: 大姚縣; pinyin: Dàyáo Xiàn; Chuxiong Yi script:, IPA：/di^{33} ʑi^{33} bu^{33}/) is a county of northwestern Yunnan province, People's Republic of China, under the administration of Chuxiong Yi Autonomous Prefecture.

== Geography ==
Dayao County is located in the northwest of Chuxiong Prefecture in northwestern Yunnan. It borders Yongren County and Yuanmou County to the east, Mouding County and Yao'an County to the south, Xiangyun County and Binchuan County to the west and Yongsheng County and Huaping County across the Jinsha River to the north.

== Administrative divisions ==
Dayao County has 8 towns, 3 townships and 1 ethnic township.

8 towns

- Jinbi (金碧镇)
- Shiyang (石羊镇)
- Liuju (六苴镇)
- Longjie (龙街镇)
- Xinjie (新街镇)
- Zhaojiadian (赵家店镇)
- Sanchahe (三岔河镇)
- Guihua (桂花镇)

3 townships

- Tanhua (昙华乡)
- Tiesuo (铁锁乡)
- Santai (三台乡)

1 ethnic township

- Wanbi Dai and Lisu (湾碧傣族傈僳族乡)

== Ethnic groups ==
The Dayao County Gazetteer (1999:780) lists the following Yi subgroups.

- Luoluopu 罗罗濮 dialect (spoken in the northwest hill districts)
  - Luoluopu 罗罗濮
  - Laluobo 腊罗拨
  - Popei 婆胚
- Lipu 俚濮 dialect: (spoken in the Qingling River 蜻蛉河 and Yipao River 一泡江 watersheds)
  - Lipu 俚濮
  - Machipu 骂池濮
  - Gesupu 格苏濮

== Climate ==
Climate data for Dayao, elevation 1,878 m (6,161 ft), (1991–2020 normals, extremes 1981–present)
Month	Jan	Feb	Mar	Apr	May	Jun	Jul	Aug	Sep	Oct	Nov	Dec	Year
Record high °C (°F)	24.5 (76.1)	25.3 (77.5)	29.3 (84.7)	31.1 (88.0)	33.7 (92.7)	32.6 (90.7)	31.9 (89.4)	31.2 (88.2)	30.1 (86.2)	28.6 (83.5)	27.8 (82.0)	23.6 (74.5)	33.7 (92.7)
Mean daily maximum °C (°F)	17.1 (62.8)	19.2 (66.6)	22.3 (72.1)	25.2 (77.4)	26.6 (79.9)	26.9 (80.4)	25.7 (78.3)	25.6 (78.1)	24.5 (76.1)	22.7 (72.9)	19.9 (67.8)	17.4 (63.3)	22.8 (73.0)
Daily mean °C (°F)	9.4 (48.9)	11.8 (53.2)	15.0 (59.0)	18.0 (64.4)	20.3 (68.5)	21.5 (70.7)	20.7 (69.3)	20.1 (68.2)	18.6 (65.5)	16.2 (61.2)	12.0 (53.6)	9.2 (48.6)	16.1 (60.9)
Mean daily minimum °C (°F)	2.2 (36.0)	4.4 (39.9)	7.8 (46.0)	11.1 (52.0)	14.8 (58.6)	17.6 (63.7)	17.5 (63.5)	16.6 (61.9)	15.0 (59.0)	12.0 (53.6)	6.1 (43.0)	2.5 (36.5)	10.6 (51.1)
Record low °C (°F)	−4.8 (23.4)	−4.5 (23.9)	−3.1 (26.4)	2.5 (36.5)	4.5 (40.1)	9.6 (49.3)	11.6 (52.9)	8.1 (46.6)	5.5 (41.9)	3.5 (38.3)	−1.0 (30.2)	−6.1 (21.0)	−6.1 (21.0)
Average precipitation mm (inches)	12.5 (0.49)	7.1 (0.28)	10.8 (0.43)	18.1 (0.71)	63.3 (2.49)	132.0 (5.20)	174.0 (6.85)	160.1 (6.30)	106.0 (4.17)	66.5 (2.62)	19.4 (0.76)	5.7 (0.22)	775.5 (30.52)
Average precipitation days (≥ 0.1 mm)	2.9	3.0	3.9	5.5	9.1	13.4	19.8	19.2	15.8	10.9	4.7	2.4	110.6
Average snowy days	0.4	0.1	0.2	0	0	0	0	0	0	0	0.1	0.2	1
Average relative humidity (%)	56	49	46	48	58	69	79	82	81	77	71	65	65
Mean monthly sunshine hours	243.9	238.7	265.1	257.9	235.8	183.9	133.7	144.4	137.8	173.8	218.8	232.9	2,466.7
Percentage possible sunshine	73	75	71	67	57	45	32	36	38	49	68	72	57
Source: China Meteorological Administrationall-time November record high

== Notable people ==
- Shi Ping, supercentenarian and politician
