= Shuangbai County =

Shuangbai County 双柏县
- County
- Location of Shuangbai County in Chuxiong Prefecture within Yunnan province

- Location of the seat in Yunnan
- Coordinates: 24°40′48″N 101°38′24″E
- Country: People's Republic of China
- Province: Yunnan
- Autonomous prefecture: Chuxiong

Area
  - Total: 4,045 km^{2} (1,562 sq mi)

Population
  - Total: 160,000
  - Density: 40/km^{2} (100/sq mi)
- Time zone: UTC+8 (CST)
- Postal code: 675100
- Area code: 0878
- Website: www.shuangbai.gov.cn

Shuangbai County (simplified Chinese: 双柏县; traditional Chinese: 雙柏縣; pinyin: Shuāngbǎi Xiàn; Chuxiong Yi script:, IPA: /de^{33} la^{33} bu^{33}/) is under the administration of the Chuxiong Yi Autonomous Prefecture, in the central part of Yunnan province, China. It is the southernmost county-level division of Chuxiong Prefecture. It borders Yimen County and Lufeng City to the east, Xinping County and Eshan County to the south, Jingdong County and Zhenyuan County to the west, and Chuxiong City to the north.

== Administrative divisions ==
Shuangbai County has five towns and three townships.

Towns

- Tuodian (妥甸镇)
- Dazhuang (大庄镇)
- Fabiao (法脿镇)
- Ejia (鄂嘉镇)
- Damaidi (大麦地镇)

Townships

- Anlongbao (安龙堡乡)
- Ainishan (爱尼山乡)
- Dutian (独田乡)

== Ethnic groups ==
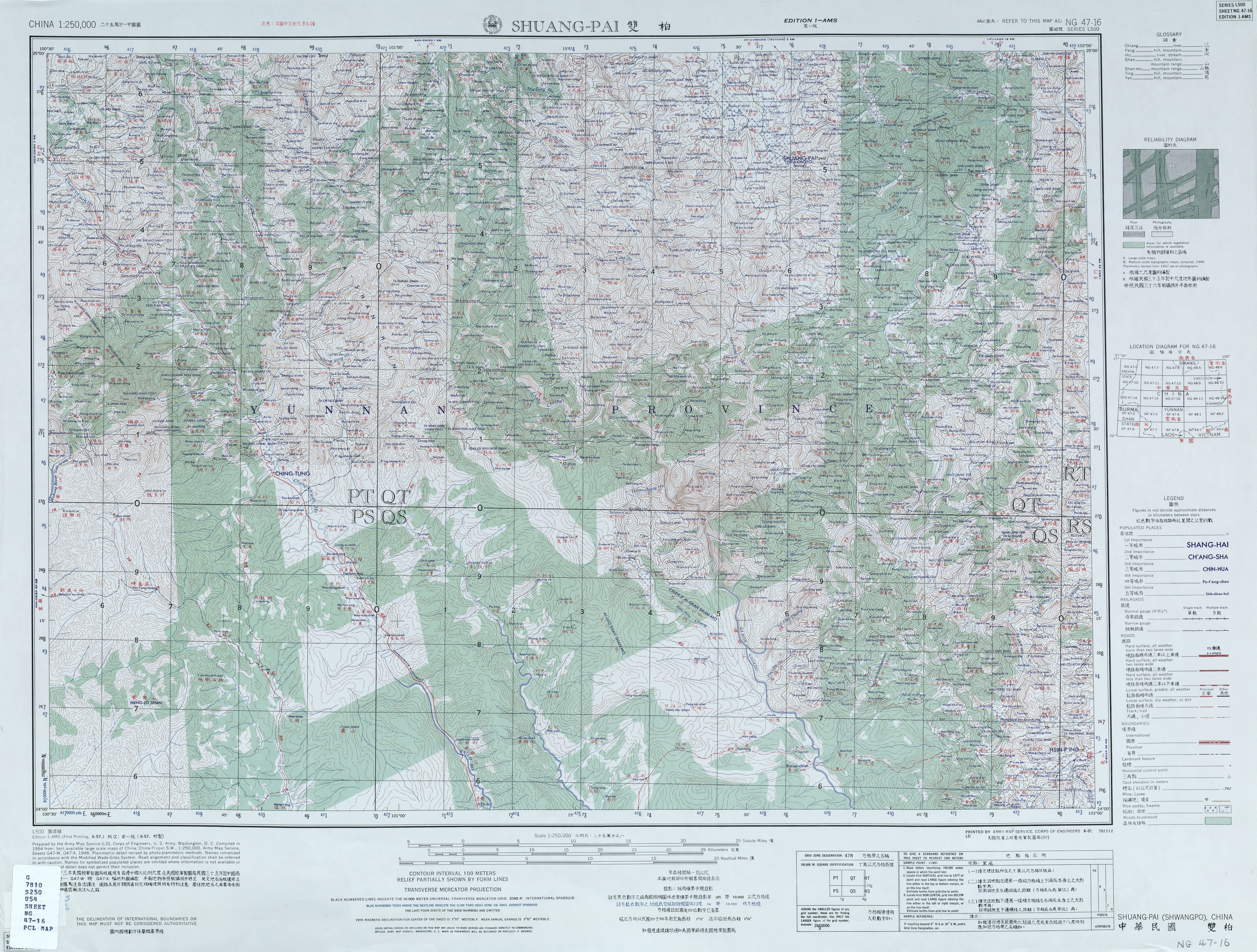
Map including Shuangbai (labeled as SHUANG-PAI (SHWANGPO) (Walled) 雙柏) (AMS, 1954)

The Shuangbai County Gazetteer (1996:89-90) lists the following ethnic subgroups. All population statistics, given in parentheses, are as of 1986.

- Yi
  - Luoluo 罗罗 (30,237)
  - Luowu 罗武 (3,455; autonym: Naisu 乃苏)
  - Ache 阿车 (20,543)
  - Chesu 车苏 (2,528): Candoutian 蚕豆田, Hekou Township 河口乡; Damaidi 大麦地, Yulong 雨龙, Ainishan 爱尼山
  - Shansu 山苏 (autonym: Lesu 勒苏): Guangming 光明村, Bajiaoqing 芭蕉箐村

== Climate ==
Climate data for Shuangbai, elevation 1,968 m (6,457 ft), (1991–2020 normals, extremes 1981–present)
Month	Jan	Feb	Mar	Apr	May	Jun	Jul	Aug	Sep	Oct	Nov	Dec	Year
Record high °C (°F)	21.5 (70.7)	24.5 (76.1)	27.3 (81.1)	28.8 (83.8)	31.3 (88.3)	31.0 (87.8)	29.8 (85.6)	28.5 (83.3)	27.7 (81.9)	27.0 (80.6)	25.2 (77.4)	21.8 (71.2)	31.3 (88.3)
Mean daily maximum °C (°F)	14.7 (58.5)	17.4 (63.3)	20.8 (69.4)	23.5 (74.3)	24.4 (75.9)	24.8 (76.6)	23.7 (74.7)	23.6 (74.5)	22.3 (72.1)	19.9 (67.8)	17.2 (63.0)	14.4 (57.9)	20.6 (69.0)
Daily mean °C (°F)	9.3 (48.7)	11.7 (53.1)	15.1 (59.2)	17.7 (63.9)	19.0 (66.2)	20.0 (68.0)	19.5 (67.1)	19.1 (66.4)	17.8 (64.0)	15.5 (59.9)	12.2 (54.0)	9.3 (48.7)	15.5 (59.9)
Mean daily minimum °C (°F)	5.3 (41.5)	7.4 (45.3)	10.5 (50.9)	13.0 (55.4)	15.0 (59.0)	16.8 (62.2)	16.8 (62.2)	16.4 (61.5)	15.1 (59.2)	12.9 (55.2)	8.8 (47.8)	5.8 (42.4)	12.0 (53.5)
Record low °C (°F)	−1.5 (29.3)	−2.8 (27.0)	−3.9 (25.0)	3.7 (38.7)	5.7 (42.3)	10.6 (51.1)	11.8 (53.2)	10.7 (51.3)	6.1 (43.0)	3.7 (38.7)	−1.7 (28.9)	−4.4 (24.1)	−4.4 (24.1)
Average precipitation mm (inches)	27.4 (1.08)	15.4 (0.61)	22.5 (0.89)	34.5 (1.36)	81.6 (3.21)	125.2 (4.93)	183.3 (7.22)	193.9 (7.63)	130.2 (5.13)	77.5 (3.05)	33.8 (1.33)	12.8 (0.50)	938.1 (36.94)
Average precipitation days (≥ 0.1 mm)	6.5	4.9	5.9	7.9	11.2	14.1	19.7	20.1	15.3	13.1	7.0	5.9	131.6
Average snowy days	0.5	0.1	0.2	0	0	0	0	0	0	0	0.2	0.2	1.2
Average relative humidity (%)	68	56	50	53	65	77	84	85	85	85	79	77	72
Mean monthly sunshine hours	218.9	225.2	249.7	248.7	218.5	159.4	122.4	134.1	128.4	137.0	182.3	186.8	2,211.4
Percentage possible sunshine	65	70	67	65	53	39	29	34	35	39	56	57	51
Source: China Meteorological Administrationall-time November record high
