= Yao'an County =

Coordinates: 25°30′25″N 101°14′30″E

Yao'an County 姚安县
- County
- Location in Yunnan
- Country: People's Republic of China
- Province: Yunnan
- Autonomous prefecture: Chuxiong

Area
  - Total: 1,803 km^{2} (696 sq mi)

Population
  - Total: 200,000
  - Density: 110/km^{2} (290/sq mi)
- Time zone: UTC+8 (CST)
- Postal code: 675300
- Area code: 0878
- Website: www.yaoan.gov.cn

Yao'an County (Chinese: 姚安县; pinyin: Yáo'ān Xiàn; Chuxiong Yi script:, IPA: /ʐa^{33} mɔ^{33} bu^{33}/) is under the administration of the Chuxiong Yi Autonomous Prefecture, in the northwest of Yunnan province, China. A prominent Chinese philosopher Li Zhi used to a prefect of Yao'an county and his governance here was warmly welcomed by local people. In 2009, an earthquake took place in Yao'an.

== Geography ==
Yao'an County is located in the west of Chuxiong Prefecture and borders Mouding County to the east, Nanhua County to the south, Dayao County to the north and Xiangyun County across the river to the west.

== Administrative divisions ==
Yao'an County has 6 towns and 3 townships.

6 towns

- Dongchuan (栋川镇)
- Guanglu (光禄镇)
- Qianchang (前场镇)
- Mixing (弥兴镇)
- Taiping (太平镇)
- Guantun (官屯镇)

3 townships

- Shizhong (适中乡)
- Zuomen (左门乡)
- Dahekou (大河口乡)

== Climate ==
Climate data for Yao'an, elevation 1,874 m (6,148 ft), (1991–2020 normals, extremes 1981–present)
Month	Jan	Feb	Mar	Apr	May	Jun	Jul	Aug	Sep	Oct	Nov	Dec	Year
Record high °C (°F)	24.0 (75.2)	25.7 (78.3)	28.9 (84.0)	31.2 (88.2)	32.5 (90.5)	32.0 (89.6)	31.9 (89.4)	30.7 (87.3)	30.2 (86.4)	28.3 (82.9)	27.6 (81.7)	23.2 (73.8)	32.5 (90.5)
Mean daily maximum °C (°F)	17.3 (63.1)	19.4 (66.9)	22.4 (72.3)	25.3 (77.5)	26.5 (79.7)	26.9 (80.4)	25.8 (78.4)	25.7 (78.3)	24.6 (76.3)	22.9 (73.2)	20.1 (68.2)	17.6 (63.7)	22.9 (73.2)
Daily mean °C (°F)	8.9 (48.0)	11.1 (52.0)	14.2 (57.6)	17.5 (63.5)	20.1 (68.2)	21.4 (70.5)	20.7 (69.3)	20.1 (68.2)	18.7 (65.7)	16.4 (61.5)	12.1 (53.8)	9.0 (48.2)	15.9 (60.5)
Mean daily minimum °C (°F)	1.5 (34.7)	3.3 (37.9)	6.4 (43.5)	10.1 (50.2)	14.5 (58.1)	17.3 (63.1)	17.4 (63.3)	16.5 (61.7)	15.0 (59.0)	12.1 (53.8)	6.2 (43.2)	2.4 (36.3)	10.2 (50.4)
Record low °C (°F)	−4.9 (23.2)	−4.6 (23.7)	−3.4 (25.9)	2.4 (36.3)	4.4 (39.9)	10.0 (50.0)	10.6 (51.1)	8.5 (47.3)	5.7 (42.3)	3.2 (37.8)	−2.3 (27.9)	−6.3 (20.7)	−6.3 (20.7)
Average precipitation mm (inches)	15.5 (0.61)	9.2 (0.36)	13.3 (0.52)	18.0 (0.71)	61.1 (2.41)	123.2 (4.85)	168.8 (6.65)	160.8 (6.33)	106.4 (4.19)	64.6 (2.54)	21.2 (0.83)	6.1 (0.24)	768.2 (30.24)
Average precipitation days (≥ 0.1 mm)	3.5	3.4	4.7	5.6	9.2	12.9	20.0	19.4	14.9	10.5	4.3	2.5	110.9
Average snowy days	0.4	0.2	0.1	0	0	0	0	0	0	0	0.1	0.2	1
Average relative humidity (%)	61	54	52	53	60	72	81	83	82	79	73	69	68
Mean monthly sunshine hours	239.7	233.8	255.6	251.5	227.9	165.4	116.0	127.8	123.6	160.3	207.5	224.2	2,333.3
Percentage possible sunshine	72	73	68	66	55	40	28	32	34	45	64	69	54
Source: China Meteorological Administrationall-time November record high
