= Xiangyun County =

Xiangyun County 祥云县 · Piel-dant xiainb
- County
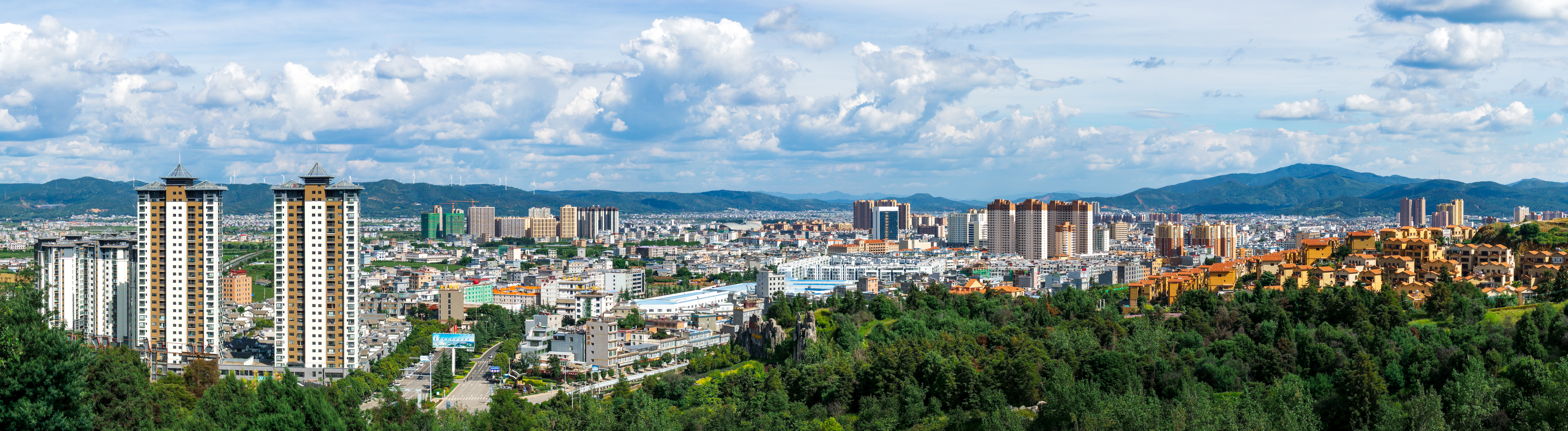

- Location of Xiangyun County (red) and Dali Prefecture (pink) within Yunnan

- Location within Yunnan Location within China
- Coordinates: 25°28′36″N 100°33′08″E
- Country: China
- Province: Yunnan
- Autonomous Prefecture: Dali
- County seat: Xiangcheng

Area
  - Total: 2,498 km^{2} (964 sq mi)

Population (2020 census)
  - Total: 406,642
  - Density: 162.8/km^{2} (421.6/sq mi)
- Time zone: UTC+8 (CST)
- Postal code: 672100
- Area code: 0872
- Website: www.xiangyun.gov.cn

Xiangyun County (simplified Chinese: 祥云县; traditional Chinese: 祥雲縣; pinyin: Xiángyún Xiàn; Bai: Piel-dant) is a county in the Dali Bai Autonomous Prefecture located in the west-central part of Yunnan province, China. It borders Dayao County, Yao'an County and Nanhua County to the east, Midu County to the south, Dali City to the west, and Binchuan County to the north.

== Administrative divisions ==
Xiangyun County has 8 towns, 1 township and 1 ethnic township.

8 towns

- Xiangcheng (祥城镇)
- Shalong (沙龙镇)
- Yunnanyi (云南驿镇)
- Xiazhuang (下庄镇)
- Pupeng (普棚镇)
- Liuchang (刘厂镇)
- Hedian (禾甸镇)
- Midian (米甸镇)

1 township

- Luming Township (鹿鸣乡)

1 ethnic township

- Dongshan Yi Ethnic Township (东山彝族乡)

Map

== Ethnic groups ==
The Xiangyun County Gazetteer (1996:138-139) lists the following ethnic Yi subgroups. Western Yi and Central Yi are linguistic classifications.

- Western Yi (Lalo)
  - Turen 土人
  - Tuzu 土族
  - Qiangyi 羌彝
- Central Yi (Lolopo)
  - Luoluopo 罗罗颇
  - Luolupo 罗鲁泼
  - Nanshansu 南山苏
- White Luoluo 白倮倮

== Climate ==
Climate data for Xiangyun, elevation 1,993 m (6,539 ft), (1991–2020 normals, extremes 1991–present)
Month	Jan	Feb	Mar	Apr	May	Jun	Jul	Aug	Sep	Oct	Nov	Dec	Year
Record high °C (°F)	21.7 (71.1)	23.9 (75.0)	27.8 (82.0)	30.0 (86.0)	31.8 (89.2)	31.8 (89.2)	30.5 (86.9)	30.9 (87.6)	29.7 (85.5)	28.2 (82.8)	25.6 (78.1)	21.3 (70.3)	31.8 (89.2)
Mean daily maximum °C (°F)	15.3 (59.5)	17.3 (63.1)	20.5 (68.9)	23.5 (74.3)	25.2 (77.4)	25.7 (78.3)	24.5 (76.1)	24.5 (76.1)	23.9 (75.0)	21.8 (71.2)	18.5 (65.3)	15.8 (60.4)	21.4 (70.5)
Daily mean °C (°F)	8.6 (47.5)	10.5 (50.9)	13.5 (56.3)	16.6 (61.9)	19.2 (66.6)	20.6 (69.1)	19.9 (67.8)	19.3 (66.7)	18.3 (64.9)	16.1 (61.0)	12.1 (53.8)	9.0 (48.2)	15.3 (59.6)
Mean daily minimum °C (°F)	2.8 (37.0)	4.4 (39.9)	7.0 (44.6)	10.5 (50.9)	14.4 (57.9)	16.9 (62.4)	16.7 (62.1)	16.0 (60.8)	14.8 (58.6)	12.3 (54.1)	7.2 (45.0)	3.5 (38.3)	10.5 (51.0)
Record low °C (°F)	−4.3 (24.3)	−3.0 (26.6)	−0.9 (30.4)	2.5 (36.5)	5.6 (42.1)	10.3 (50.5)	11.0 (51.8)	8.6 (47.5)	5.5 (41.9)	4.2 (39.6)	−1.4 (29.5)	−6.8 (19.8)	−6.8 (19.8)
Average precipitation mm (inches)	16.8 (0.66)	12.5 (0.49)	16.4 (0.65)	22.6 (0.89)	60.7 (2.39)	117.1 (4.61)	168.8 (6.65)	174.1 (6.85)	112.9 (4.44)	71.3 (2.81)	21.7 (0.85)	7.4 (0.29)	802.3 (31.58)
Average precipitation days (≥ 0.1 mm)	4.1	4.2	5.9	6.7	8.9	11.3	18.4	18.1	15.0	11.1	4.5	2.8	111
Average snowy days	0.4	0.1	0.3	0	0	0	0	0	0	0	0.1	0.2	1.1
Average relative humidity (%)	57	53	50	52	60	71	80	83	80	76	68	64	66
Mean monthly sunshine hours	245.2	230.2	248.8	238.5	225.3	185.6	121.2	131.0	148.5	180.0	218.8	237.4	2,410.5
Percentage possible sunshine	73	72	67	62	54	45	29	33	41	51	67	73	56
Source: China Meteorological Administrationall-time November record high
