= Mouding County =

Mouding County 牟定县
- County
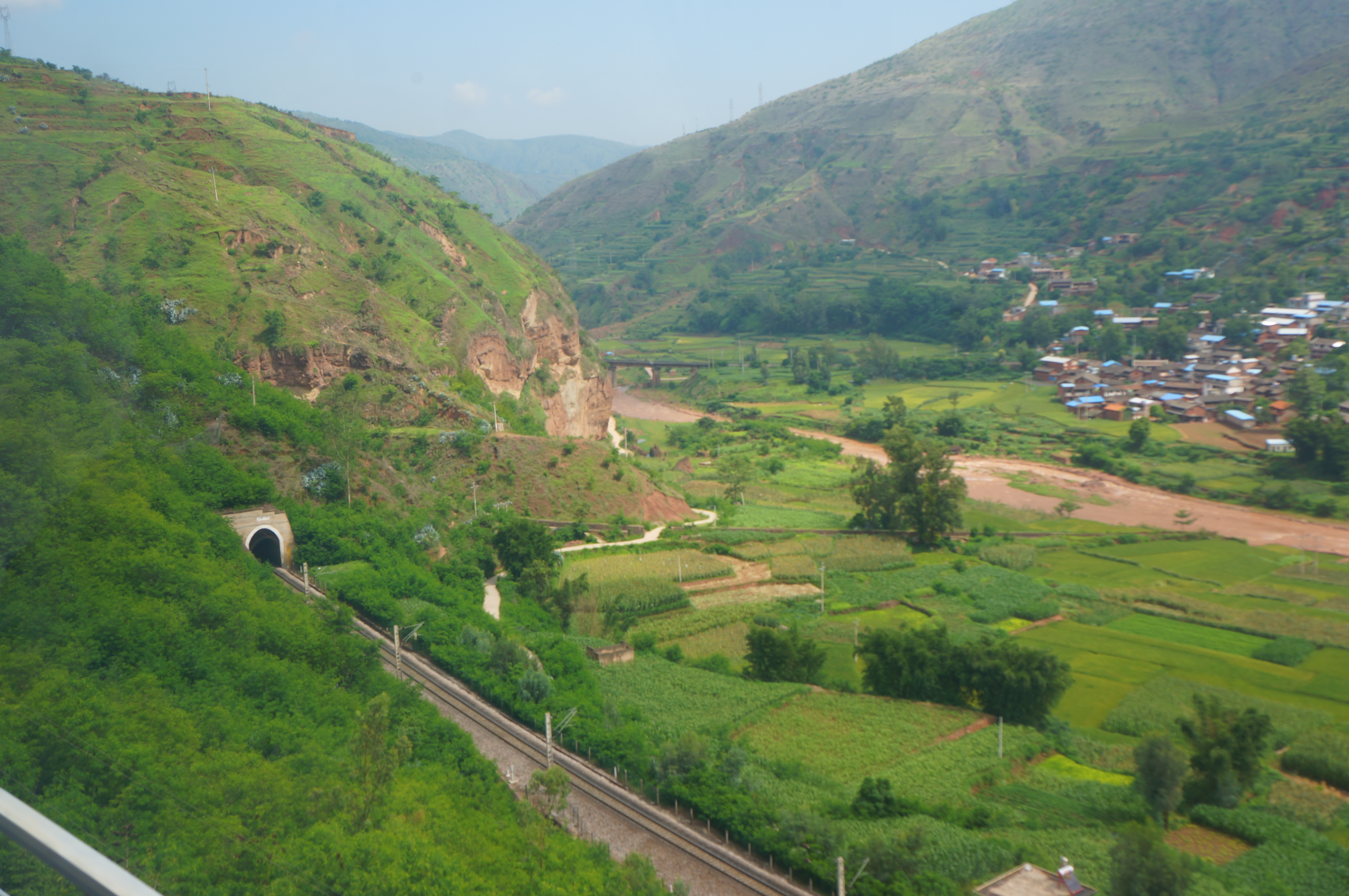

- Location of Mouding County in Chuxiong Prefecture within Yunnan province

- Location of the seat in Yunnan
- Coordinates: 25°18′47″N 101°32′49″E
- Country: People's Republic of China
- Province: Yunnan
- Autonomous prefecture: Chuxiong

Area
  - Total: 1,646 km^{2} (636 sq mi)

Population
  - Total: 250,000
  - Density: 150/km^{2} (390/sq mi)
- Time zone: UTC+8 (CST)
- Postal code: 675500
- Area code: 0878
- Website: http://www.mdx.gov.cn/

Mouding County (Chinese: 牟定县; pinyin: Móudìng Xiàn; Chuxiong Yi script:, IPA: /mɯ^{21} di^{33} bu^{33}/) is located in Chuxiong Yi Autonomous Prefecture, Yunnan province, China. It borders Lufeng, Yunnan to the east, Chuxiong City to the south, Nanhua County and Yao'an County to the west, and Dayao County and Yuanmou County to the north.

== Administrative divisions ==
Mouding County has 4 towns and 3 townships.

4 towns

- Gonghe (共和镇)
- Xinqiao (新桥镇)
- Jiangpo (江坡镇)
- Fengtun (凤屯镇)

3 townships

- Panmao (蟠猫乡)
- Xujie (戌街乡)
- Anle (安乐乡)

== Climate ==
Climate data for Mouding, elevation 1,822 m (5,978 ft), (1991–2020 normals, extremes 1981–present)
Month	Jan	Feb	Mar	Apr	May	Jun	Jul	Aug	Sep	Oct	Nov	Dec	Year
Record high °C (°F)	24.9 (76.8)	27.4 (81.3)	29.9 (85.8)	32.1 (89.8)	33.5 (92.3)	32.8 (91.0)	32.5 (90.5)	31.6 (88.9)	31.1 (88.0)	29.2 (84.6)	28.2 (82.8)	25.0 (77.0)	33.5 (92.3)
Mean daily maximum °C (°F)	17.8 (64.0)	20.1 (68.2)	23.1 (73.6)	25.8 (78.4)	26.9 (80.4)	27.2 (81.0)	26.2 (79.2)	26.0 (78.8)	24.7 (76.5)	22.8 (73.0)	20.3 (68.5)	17.6 (63.7)	23.2 (73.8)
Daily mean °C (°F)	9.3 (48.7)	11.7 (53.1)	15.0 (59.0)	18.3 (64.9)	20.7 (69.3)	21.9 (71.4)	21.2 (70.2)	20.6 (69.1)	19.3 (66.7)	16.9 (62.4)	12.7 (54.9)	9.5 (49.1)	16.4 (61.6)
Mean daily minimum °C (°F)	2.1 (35.8)	4.2 (39.6)	7.3 (45.1)	11.3 (52.3)	15.4 (59.7)	17.9 (64.2)	17.9 (64.2)	17.1 (62.8)	15.7 (60.3)	12.9 (55.2)	7.1 (44.8)	3.2 (37.8)	11.0 (51.8)
Record low °C (°F)	−4.8 (23.4)	−4.7 (23.5)	−2.7 (27.1)	4.0 (39.2)	6.0 (42.8)	10.8 (51.4)	11.7 (53.1)	10.7 (51.3)	8.0 (46.4)	4.2 (39.6)	−1.7 (28.9)	−7.3 (18.9)	−7.3 (18.9)
Average precipitation mm (inches)	15.9 (0.63)	7.3 (0.29)	15.0 (0.59)	22.0 (0.87)	71.4 (2.81)	139.5 (5.49)	180.0 (7.09)	193.5 (7.62)	115.3 (4.54)	71.7 (2.82)	28.6 (1.13)	7.5 (0.30)	867.7 (34.18)
Average precipitation days (≥ 0.1 mm)	3.8	3.2	4.9	6.3	9.3	12.8	18.9	19.3	15.0	11.6	5.2	2.9	113.2
Average snowy days	0.3	0	0.1	0	0	0	0	0	0	0	0.1	0.2	0.7
Average relative humidity (%)	63	55	51	51	59	70	79	81	81	78	74	71	68
Mean monthly sunshine hours	229.4	227.0	247.4	238.3	217.3	161.5	116.1	133.3	124.0	153.1	195.1	207.6	2,250.1
Percentage possible sunshine	69	71	66	62	52	39	28	33	34	43	60	64	52
Source: China Meteorological Administrationall-time November record high
