= Yongren County =

Coordinates: 26°03′43″N 101°40′12″E

Yongren County 永仁县
- County
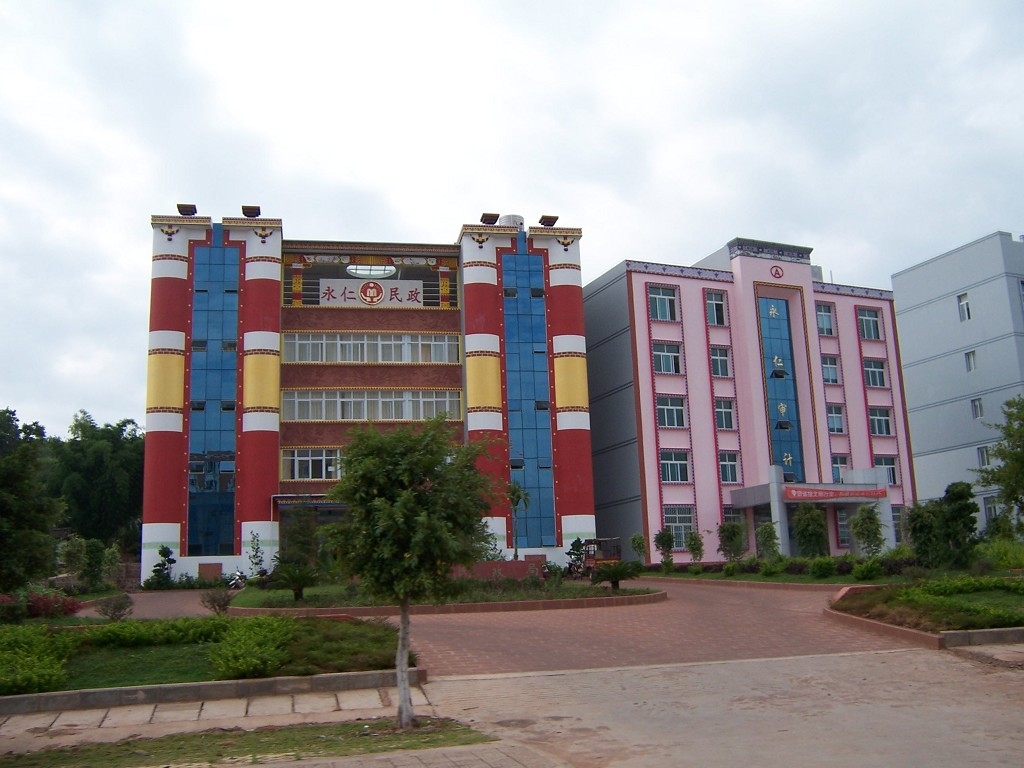

- Location in Yunnan
- Country: People's Republic of China
- Province: Yunnan
- Autonomous prefecture: Chuxiong

Area
  - Total: 2,189 km^{2} (845 sq mi)

Population
  - Total: 100,000
  - Density: 46/km^{2} (120/sq mi)
- Time zone: UTC+8 (CST)
- Postal code: 651400
- Area code: 0878
- Website: Website

Yongren County (Chinese: 永仁县; pinyin: Yǒngrén Xiàn; Chuxiong Yi script:, [zô kʰû bū]) is a county under the administration of the Chuxiong Yi Autonomous Prefecture, in the north of Yunnan province, China. It borders Huili, Sichuan across the Jinsha River to the east, Yuanmou County to the southeast, Dayao County to the southwest, Renhe District of Panzhihua, Sichuan to the northeast, and Huaping County across the Jinsha River to the northwest.

== Administrative divisions ==
Yongren County has 3 towns, 3 townships and 1 ethnic township.

3 towns

- Yongding (永定镇)
- Yijiu (宜就镇)
- Zhonghe (中和镇)

3 townships

- Lianchi (莲池乡)
- Weide (维的乡)
- Menghu (猛虎乡)

1 ethnic township

- Yongxing Dai (永兴傣族乡)

== Ethnic groups ==
Yi subgroups in Yongren County include the Lipo 里颇, Luoluopo 罗罗颇, and Nuosu 诺苏 (Yongren County Gazetteer 1995:95).

== Climate ==
Climate data for Yongren, elevation 1,589 m (5,213 ft), (1991–2020 normals, extremes 1981–present)
| Month | Jan | Feb | Mar | Apr | May | Jun | Jul | Aug | Sep | Oct | Nov | Dec | Year |
|---|---|---|---|---|---|---|---|---|---|---|---|---|---|
| Record high °C (°F) | 26.0 (78.8) | 29.0 (84.2) | 32.4 (90.3) | 34.7 (94.5) | 36.5 (97.7) | 34.9 (94.8) | 35.2 (95.4) | 32.4 (90.3) | 32.4 (90.3) | 31.0 (87.8) | 29.2 (84.6) | 25.2 (77.4) | 36.5 (97.7) |
| Mean daily maximum °C (°F) | 19.5 (67.1) | 22.2 (72.0) | 25.5 (77.9) | 28.3 (82.9) | 29.2 (84.6) | 29.0 (84.2) | 28.0 (82.4) | 27.9 (82.2) | 26.3 (79.3) | 24.3 (75.7) | 21.6 (70.9) | 19.0 (66.2) | 25.1 (77.1) |
| Daily mean °C (°F) | 10.2 (50.4) | 13.1 (55.6) | 16.9 (62.4) | 20.3 (68.5) | 22.6 (72.7) | 23.5 (74.3) | 22.8 (73.0) | 22.2 (72.0) | 20.5 (68.9) | 17.8 (64.0) | 13.2 (55.8) | 9.8 (49.6) | 17.7 (63.9) |
| Mean daily minimum °C (°F) | 2.3 (36.1) | 4.6 (40.3) | 8.3 (46.9) | 12.4 (54.3) | 16.4 (61.5) | 19.0 (66.2) | 19.0 (66.2) | 18.3 (64.9) | 16.7 (62.1) | 13.5 (56.3) | 7.4 (45.3) | 3.1 (37.6) | 11.8 (53.1) |
| Record low °C (°F) | −3.1 (26.4) | −1.5 (29.3) | −1.7 (28.9) | 4.0 (39.2) | 7.3 (45.1) | 11.8 (53.2) | 13.6 (56.5) | 12.5 (54.5) | 7.5 (45.5) | 6.1 (43.0) | −0.1 (31.8) | −4.4 (24.1) | −4.4 (24.1) |
| Average precipitation mm (inches) | 8.5 (0.33) | 4.8 (0.19) | 7.6 (0.30) | 16.2 (0.64) | 61.8 (2.43) | 150.2 (5.91) | 194.5 (7.66) | 157.9 (6.22) | 148.3 (5.84) | 78.4 (3.09) | 18.6 (0.73) | 3.9 (0.15) | 850.7 (33.49) |
| Average precipitation days (≥ 0.1 mm) | 2.3 | 2.1 | 2.7 | 4.4 | 9.7 | 13.9 | 18.7 | 16.9 | 14.6 | 11.2 | 4.0 | 2.0 | 102.5 |
| Average snowy days | 0.2 | 0 | 0 | 0 | 0 | 0 | 0 | 0 | 0 | 0 | 0 | 0 | 0.2 |
| Average relative humidity (%) | 60 | 50 | 45 | 47 | 55 | 70 | 79 | 81 | 82 | 79 | 74 | 70 | 66 |
| Mean monthly sunshine hours | 248.5 | 242.5 | 263.9 | 254.7 | 235.0 | 179.8 | 155.9 | 169.7 | 145.9 | 179.2 | 222.8 | 229.3 | 2,527.2 |
| Percentage possible sunshine | 75 | 76 | 71 | 66 | 56 | 44 | 37 | 42 | 40 | 51 | 69 | 71 | 58 |
Source: China Meteorological Administrationall-time November record high
