= Yuanmou County =

Coordinates: 25°43′04″N 101°51′40″E

Yuanmou County 元谋县
- County
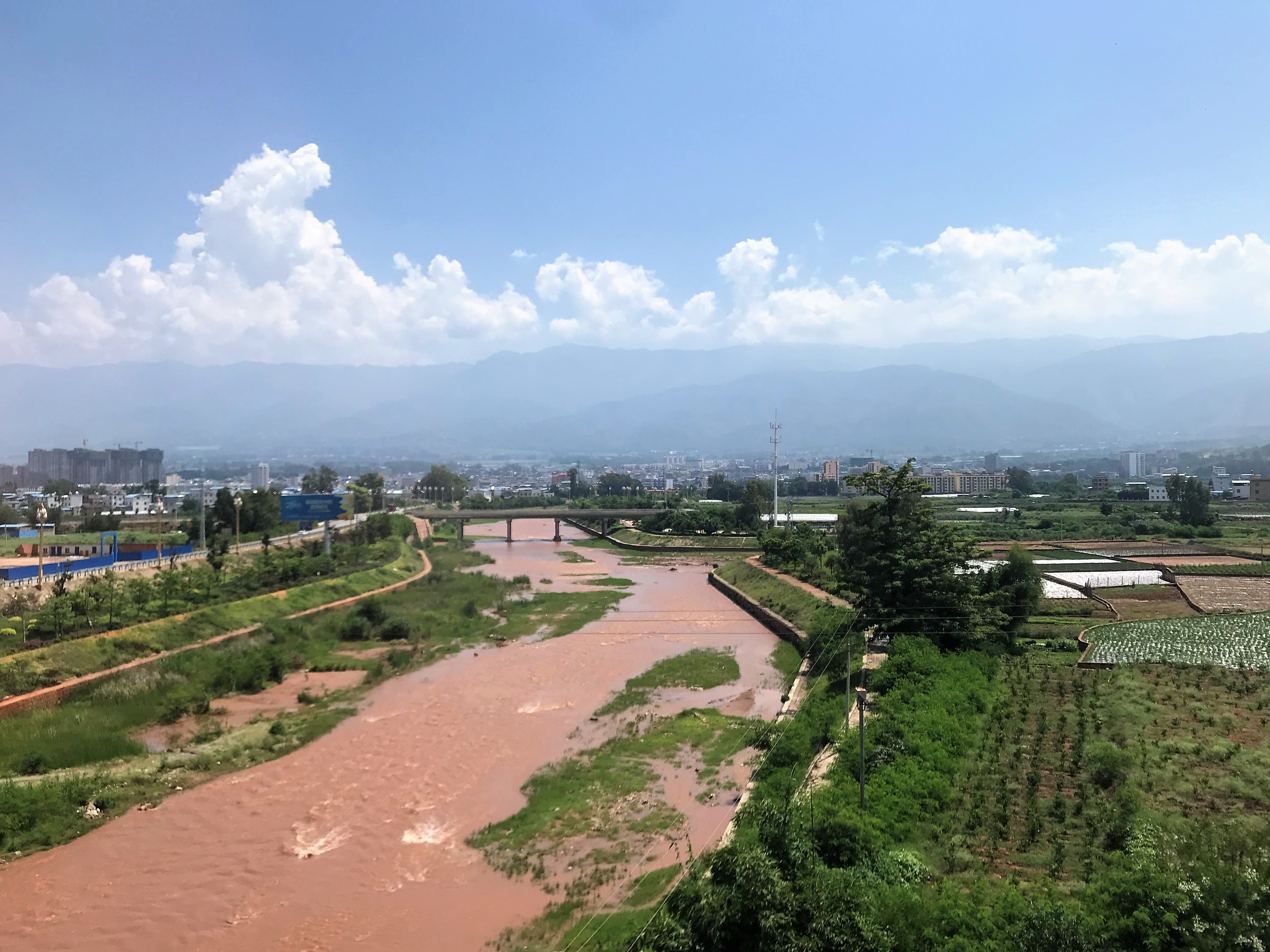

- Location in Yunnan
- Country: People's Republic of China
- Province: Yunnan
- Autonomous prefecture: Chuxiong

Area
  - Total: 2,021 km^{2} (780 sq mi)

Population
  - Total: 210,000
  - Density: 100/km^{2} (270/sq mi)
- Time zone: UTC+8 (CST)
- Postal code: 651300
- Area code: 0878
- Website: yuanmou.gov.cn

Yuanmou County (simplified Chinese: 元谋县; traditional Chinese: 元謀縣; pinyin: Yuánmóu Xiàn; Chuxiong Yi script:, IPA: /pʻə^{33} lə^{21} bu^{33}/) is under the administration of the Chuxiong Yi Autonomous Prefecture, in the north of Yunnan province, China. It borders Wuding County to the east, Lufeng, Yunnan to the south, Dayao County to the west, Huili of Sichuan to the north, Mouding County to the southwest, and Yongren County to the northwest.

The famous Yuanmou Man was found in Yuanmou County in 1965.

The Dinosaur Yuanmouraptor was named after this county

== Administrative divisions ==
Yuanmou County has 3 towns and 7 townships.

3 towns

- Yuanma (元马镇)
- Huangguayuan (黄瓜园镇)
- Yangjie (羊街镇)

7 townships

- Laocheng (老城乡)
- Wumao (物茂乡)
- Jiangbian (江边乡)
- Xinhua (新华乡)
- Pingtian (平田乡)
- Liangshan (凉山乡)
- Jiangyi (姜驿乡)

== Climate ==
Climate data for Yuanmou, elevation 1,121 m (3,678 ft), (1991–2020 normals, extremes 1991–present)
Month	Jan	Feb	Mar	Apr	May	Jun	Jul	Aug	Sep	Oct	Nov	Dec	Year
Record high °C (°F)	31.2 (88.2)	34.6 (94.3)	36.7 (98.1)	39.1 (102.4)	41.6 (106.9)	42.4 (108.3)	38.9 (102.0)	37.5 (99.5)	37.5 (99.5)	35.7 (96.3)	33.7 (92.7)	30.1 (86.2)	42.4 (108.3)
Mean daily maximum °C (°F)	23.7 (74.7)	26.5 (79.7)	29.7 (85.5)	32.3 (90.1)	32.9 (91.2)	32.7 (90.9)	31.4 (88.5)	31.3 (88.3)	30.2 (86.4)	28.2 (82.8)	25.7 (78.3)	23.2 (73.8)	29.0 (84.2)
Daily mean °C (°F)	14.5 (58.1)	17.5 (63.5)	21.1 (70.0)	24.5 (76.1)	26.2 (79.2)	26.8 (80.2)	25.8 (78.4)	25.3 (77.5)	24.2 (75.6)	21.7 (71.1)	17.3 (63.1)	14.2 (57.6)	21.6 (70.9)
Mean daily minimum °C (°F)	7.2 (45.0)	9.8 (49.6)	13.3 (55.9)	17.1 (62.8)	20.4 (68.7)	22.3 (72.1)	21.9 (71.4)	21.3 (70.3)	20.3 (68.5)	17.4 (63.3)	11.4 (52.5)	7.7 (45.9)	15.8 (60.5)
Record low °C (°F)	0.7 (33.3)	2.5 (36.5)	4.0 (39.2)	9.3 (48.7)	11.7 (53.1)	15.0 (59.0)	16.3 (61.3)	15.3 (59.5)	11.4 (52.5)	9.9 (49.8)	0.0 (32.0)	−1.3 (29.7)	−1.3 (29.7)
Average precipitation mm (inches)	8.3 (0.33)	4.2 (0.17)	7.6 (0.30)	14.3 (0.56)	61.2 (2.41)	120.8 (4.76)	140.1 (5.52)	108.4 (4.27)	90.1 (3.55)	58.1 (2.29)	19.6 (0.77)	4.8 (0.19)	637.5 (25.12)
Average precipitation days (≥ 0.1 mm)	2.1	1.4	2.8	4.1	8.3	12.4	17.0	15.4	11.8	9.4	3.5	1.9	90.1
Average relative humidity (%)	53	43	39	39	50	63	72	73	71	69	67	62	58
Mean monthly sunshine hours	249.1	241.6	260.3	250.5	230.8	182.4	160.1	170.9	156.0	179.8	222.1	231.1	2,534.7
Percentage possible sunshine	75	75	70	65	56	44	38	43	43	51	69	71	58
Source: China Meteorological Administrationall-time November record high

== Tourist Resources ==
Besides the big discovery of Yuanmou Man, Yuanmou County is also famous for its Tulin, which literally means earth forest. It is a natural landscape composed of earth columns or pillars forming like immense forest. The unique landscape was formed by geological movement and soil erosion one or two million years ago. It is named for its shape like immense forest and the main composition of the expansion is earth.There are three scenic areas, which are Wumao Earth Forest, Langbapu Earth Forest and Banguo Earth Forest. Wumao and Langbapu have been developed as scenic areas. Yuanmou Earth Forest has been more and more popular these years.
