= Midu County =

Midu County 弥渡县
- County
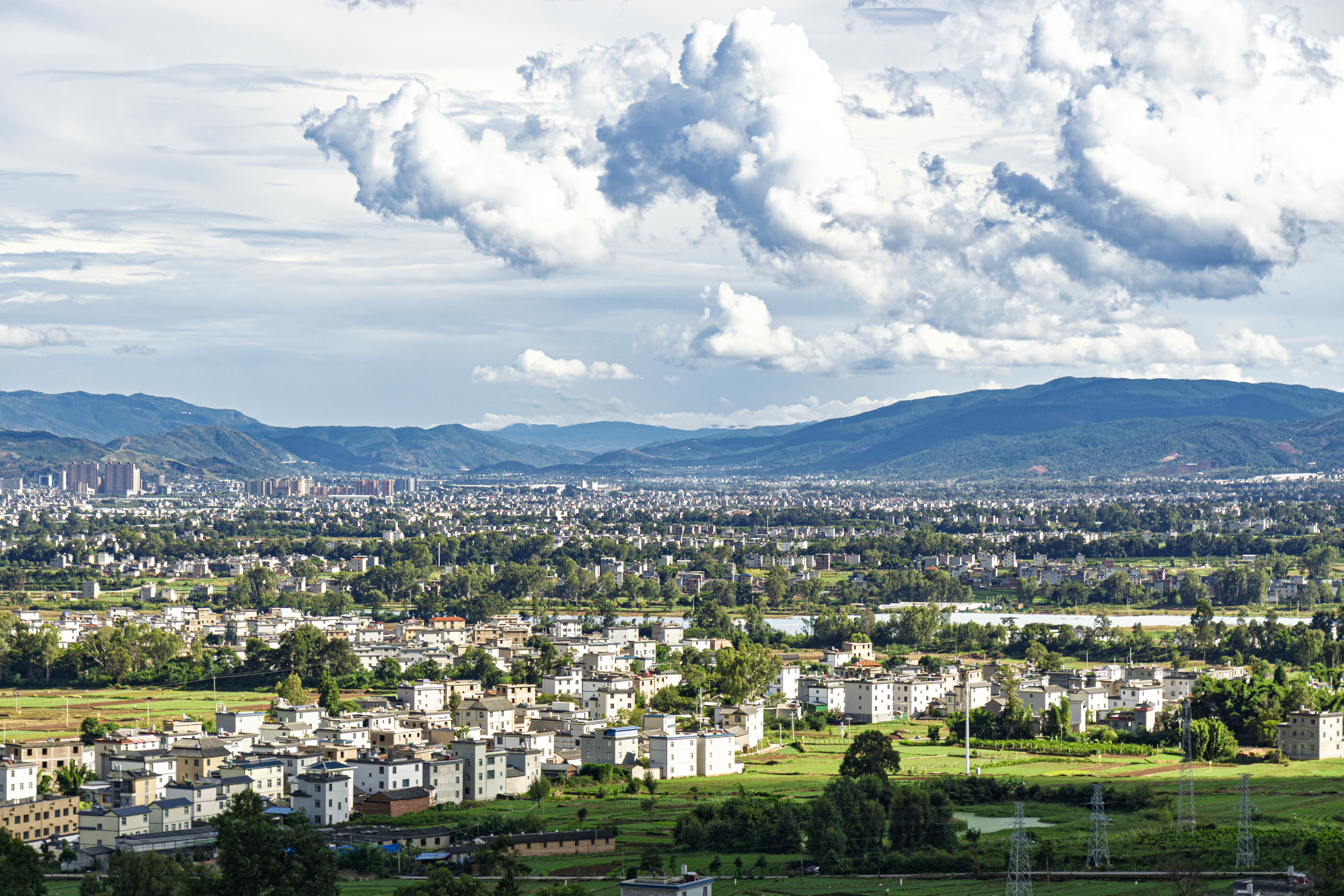

- Location of Midu County (red) and Dali Prefecture (pink) within Yunnan

- Location of the seat in Yunnan Midu (China)
- Coordinates: 25°20′34″N 100°29′35″E
- Country: China
- Province: Yunnan
- Autonomous prefecture: Dali
- County seat: Micheng

Area
  - Total: 1,571 km^{2} (607 sq mi)

Population (2020 census)
  - Total: 261,205
  - Density: 166.3/km^{2} (430.6/sq mi)
- Time zone: UTC+8 (CST)
- Postal code: 675600
- Area code: 0872
- Website: www.midu.gov.cn

Midu County (simplified Chinese: 弥渡县; traditional Chinese: 彌渡縣; pinyin: Mídù Xiàn) is a county in the Dali Bai Autonomous Prefecture located in the northwest of Yunnan province, China. It borders Xiangyun County and Nanhua County to the east, Jingdong County and Nanjian County to the south, Weishan County to the west and Dali City to the north.

== Administrative divisions ==
Midu County has 6 towns, 1 township and 1 ethnic township.

6 towns

- Micheng (弥城镇)
- Hongyan (红岩镇)
- Xinjie (新街镇)
- Yinjie (寅街镇)
- Juli (苴力镇)
- Mizhi (密祉镇)

1 township

- Deju Township (德苴乡)

1 ethnic township

- Niujie Yi Ethnic Township (牛街彝族乡)

Map

== Ethnic groups ==
The Midu County Gazetteer (1993:721) lists the following ethnic groups.

- Yi people
  - Mocha 墨叉
  - Luowu 罗婺
  - Tuzu 土族
- Hui people
- Bai people
- Lisu people
- Han people

== Transportation ==
- China National Highway 214

== Climate ==
Climate data for Midu, elevation 1,712 m (5,617 ft), (1991–2020 normals, extremes 1981–present)
Month	Jan	Feb	Mar	Apr	May	Jun	Jul	Aug	Sep	Oct	Nov	Dec	Year
Record high °C (°F)	23.9 (75.0)	26.3 (79.3)	30.3 (86.5)	32.6 (90.7)	34.0 (93.2)	33.2 (91.8)	32.7 (90.9)	31.7 (89.1)	31.8 (89.2)	29.4 (84.9)	27.4 (81.3)	23.1 (73.6)	34.0 (93.2)
Mean daily maximum °C (°F)	18.1 (64.6)	20.1 (68.2)	23.2 (73.8)	25.9 (78.6)	27.2 (81.0)	27.7 (81.9)	26.8 (80.2)	26.8 (80.2)	26.0 (78.8)	23.9 (75.0)	21.0 (69.8)	18.5 (65.3)	23.8 (74.8)
Daily mean °C (°F)	9.9 (49.8)	12.2 (54.0)	15.4 (59.7)	18.6 (65.5)	21.3 (70.3)	22.6 (72.7)	21.8 (71.2)	21.2 (70.2)	20.1 (68.2)	17.6 (63.7)	13.3 (55.9)	10.2 (50.4)	17.0 (62.6)
Mean daily minimum °C (°F)	3.0 (37.4)	4.9 (40.8)	8.0 (46.4)	11.8 (53.2)	16.1 (61.0)	18.8 (65.8)	18.5 (65.3)	17.7 (63.9)	16.3 (61.3)	13.3 (55.9)	7.5 (45.5)	3.8 (38.8)	11.6 (52.9)
Record low °C (°F)	−4.7 (23.5)	−3.4 (25.9)	−1.4 (29.5)	3.0 (37.4)	6.8 (44.2)	12.9 (55.2)	12.7 (54.9)	10.6 (51.1)	7.2 (45.0)	4.9 (40.8)	−0.3 (31.5)	−5.9 (21.4)	−5.9 (21.4)
Average precipitation mm (inches)	20.0 (0.79)	14.3 (0.56)	19.9 (0.78)	26.6 (1.05)	62.6 (2.46)	106.2 (4.18)	157.4 (6.20)	162.4 (6.39)	110.2 (4.34)	70.5 (2.78)	22.4 (0.88)	8.4 (0.33)	780.9 (30.74)
Average precipitation days (≥ 0.1 mm)	3.9	4.3	6.5	7.0	9.2	12.1	18.3	18.0	14.4	11.0	4.4	2.5	111.6
Average snowy days	0.2	0	0.1	0	0	0	0	0	0	0	0.1	0	0.4
Average relative humidity (%)	59	53	50	51	58	69	78	81	79	76	70	66	66
Mean monthly sunshine hours	254.6	242.8	267.0	259.4	244.1	201.0	154.8	163.3	164.3	189.4	227.5	243.0	2,611.2
Percentage possible sunshine	76	76	71	68	59	49	37	41	45	53	70	74	60
Source: China Meteorological Administrationall-time November record high
