= Chuxiong Yi Autonomous Prefecture =

Autonomous prefecture in Yunnan, China

Chuxiong Prefecture 楚雄州
- Autonomous prefecture
- 楚雄彝族自治州; Chuxiong Yi Autonomous Prefecture
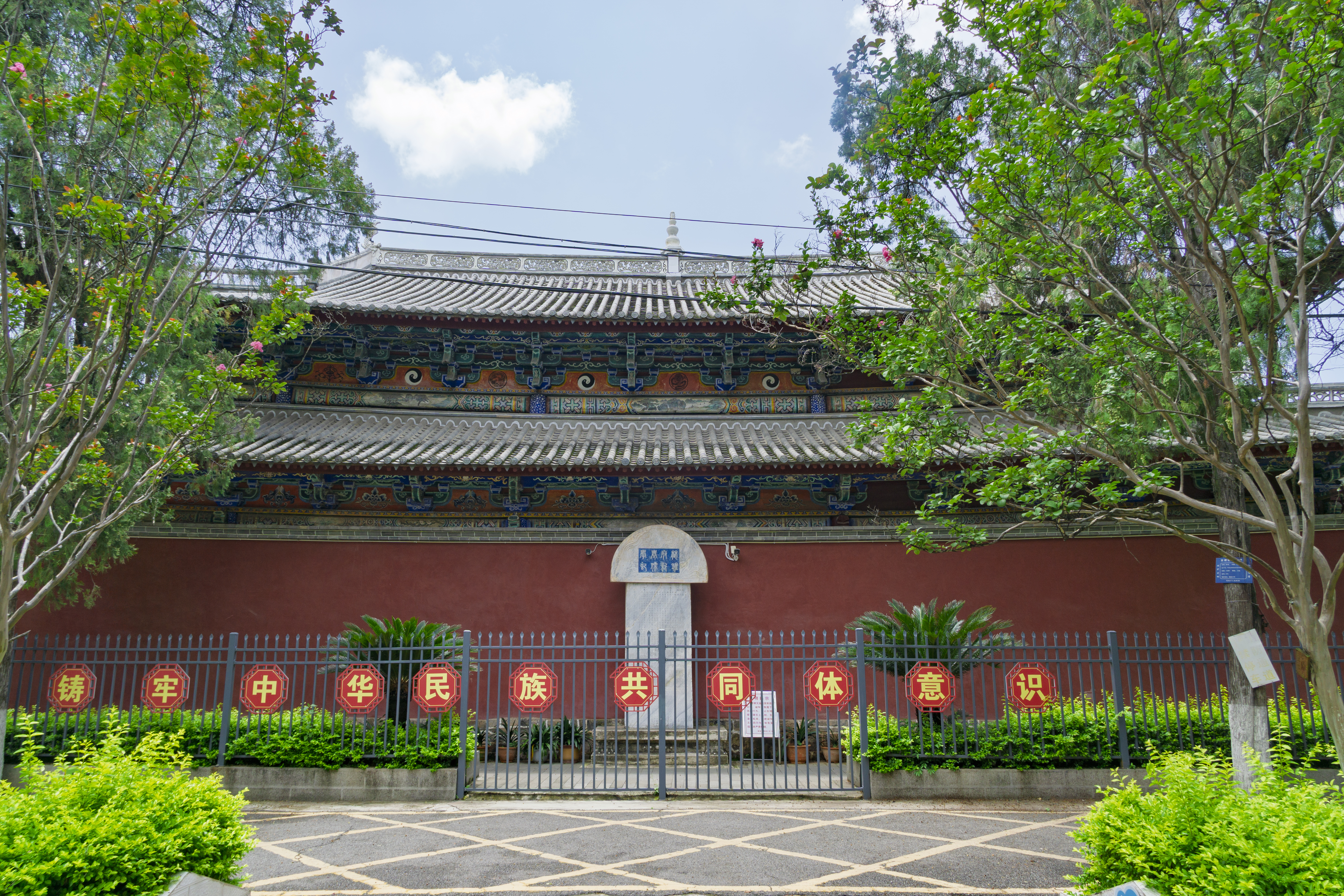
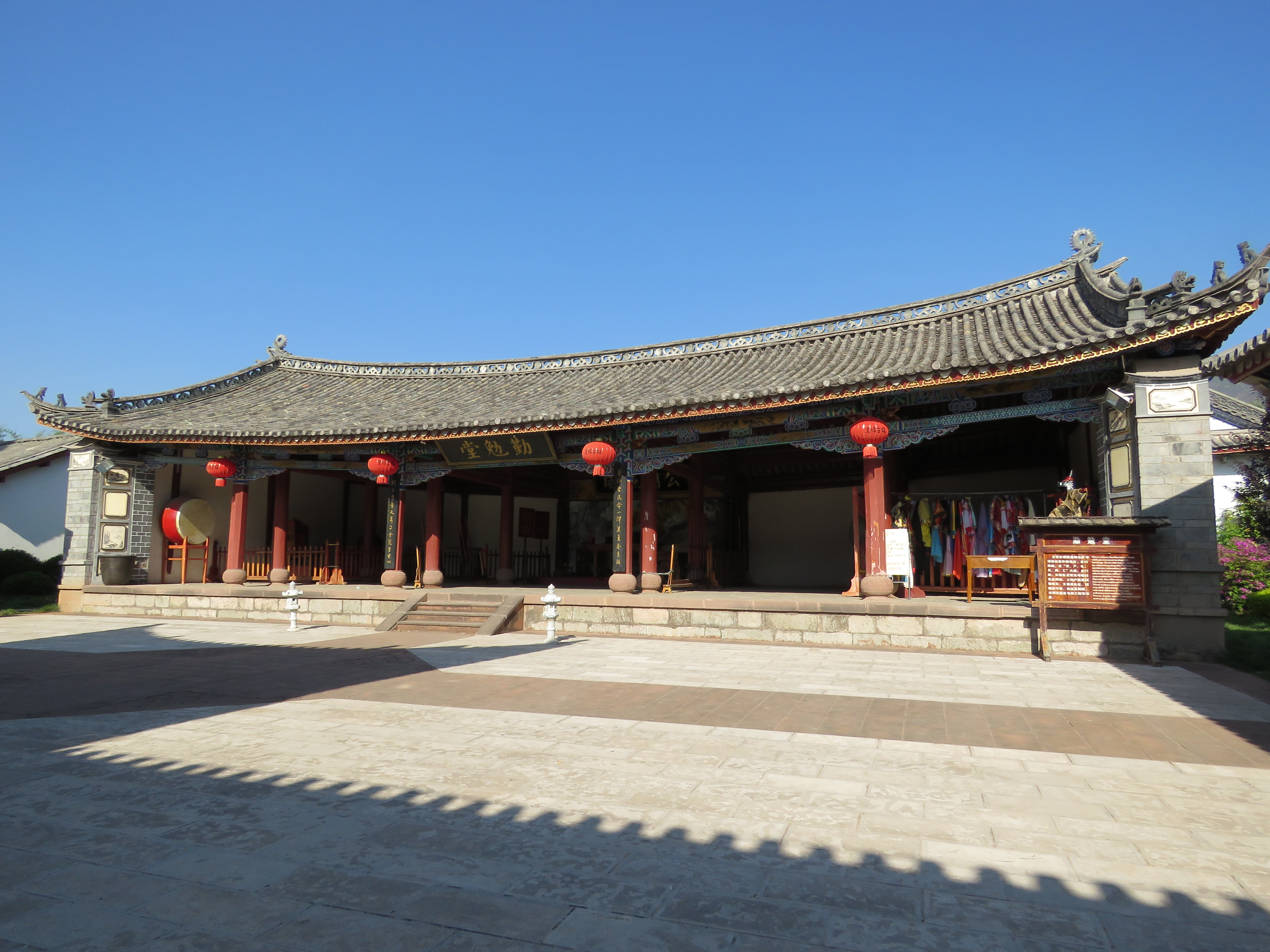
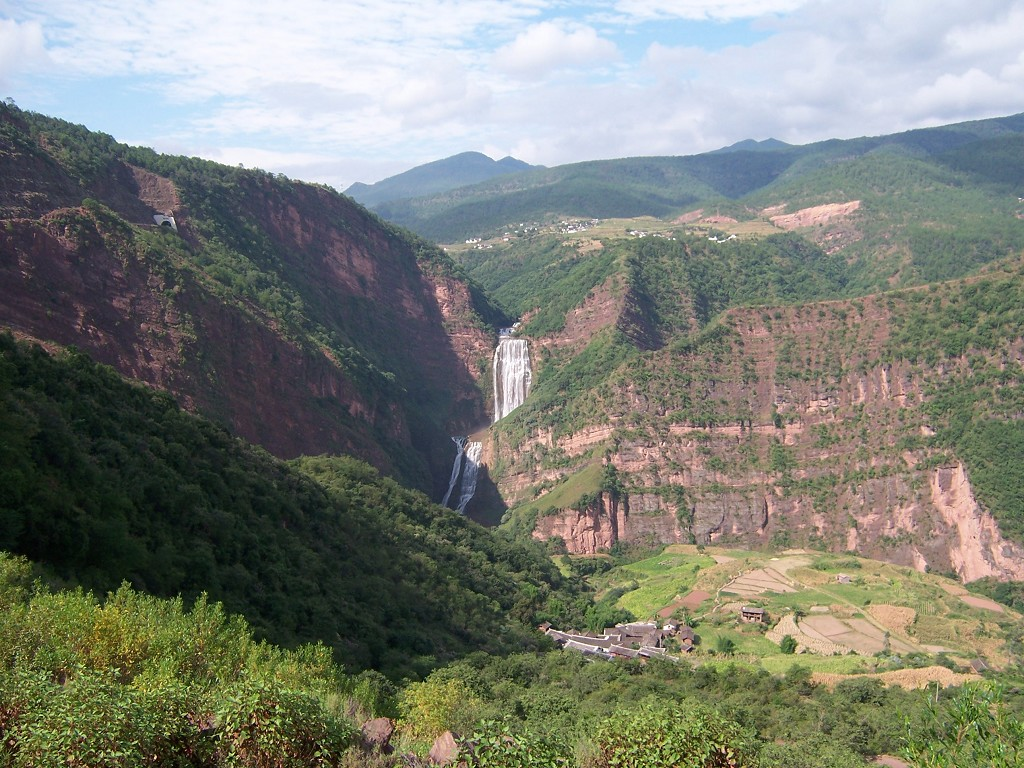
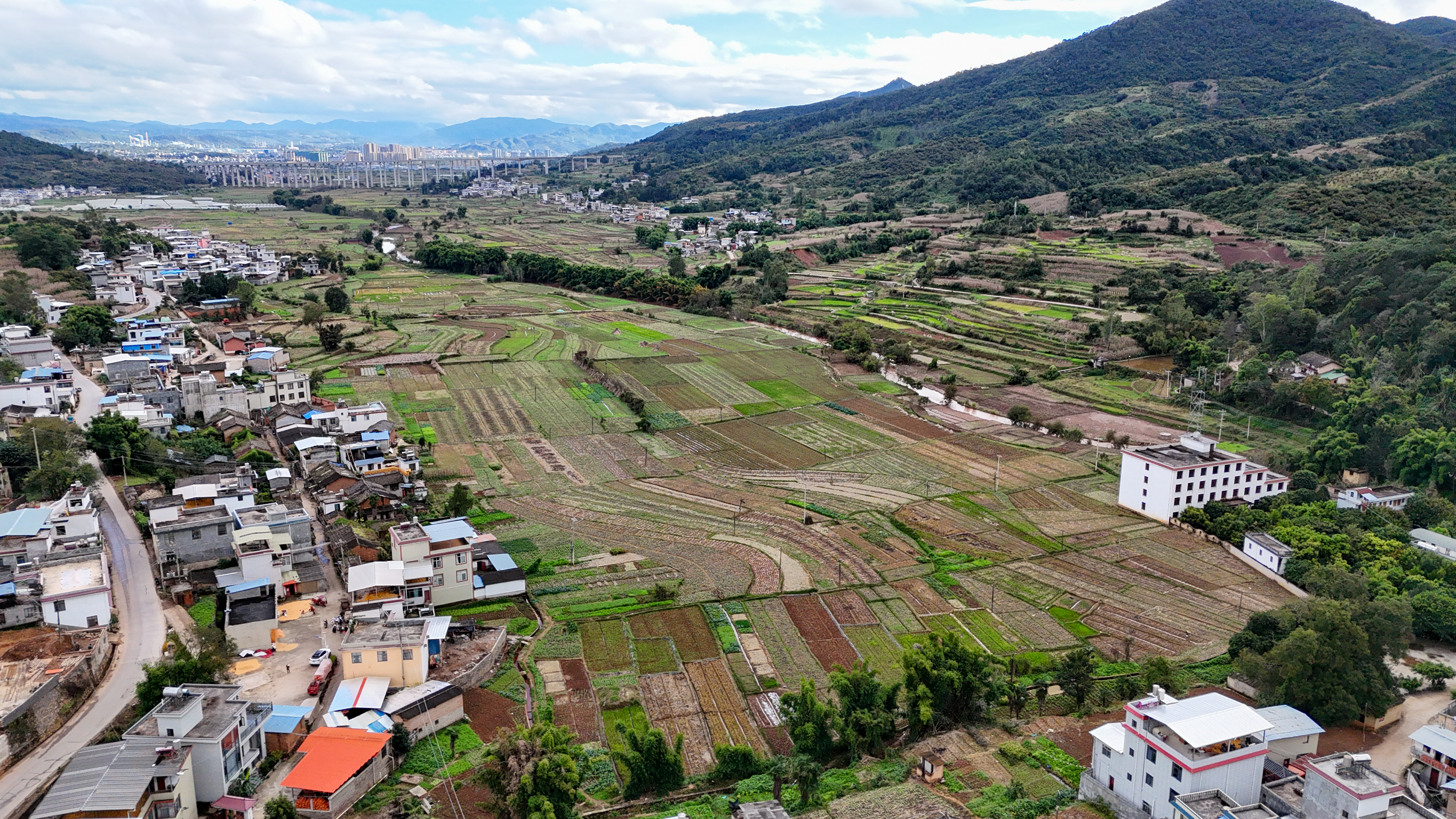
- Chuxiong Confucian Temple Yao'an Circuit Governance Building Santan Falls in Dayao Lufeng

- Location of Chuxiong Prefecture in Yunnan
- Coordinates (Chuxiong Prefecture government): 25°02′46″N 101°31′41″E
- Country: People's Republic of China
- Province: Yunnan
- Admin HQ: Chuxiong

Area
  - Total: 29,256 km^{2} (11,296 sq mi)

Population (2023)
  - Total: 2,648,682
  - Density: 90.535/km^{2} (234.48/sq mi)

GDP
  - Total: CN¥ 176.3 billion US$ 26.0 billion
  - Per capita: CN¥ 74,046; US$ 10,921
- Postal code: 675000
- Area code: 0878
- ISO 3166 code: CN-YN-23
- License Plate Prefix: 云E
- Website: cxz.gov.cn (in Chinese)

Chuxiong Prefecture, officially the Chuxiong Yi Autonomous Prefecture (Chinese: 楚雄彝族自治州; pinyin: Chǔxióng Yízú Zìzhìzhōu; Chuxiong Yi script: , IPA: /ɣo^{21} lu^{21} nə^{55} su^{33} ʑɔ^{33} gɔ^{21} mi^{33}/; Yi script: ꊉꇑꆑꌠꑼꂰ; Yi Pinyin: wop lup nut su yuop mi), is an autonomous prefecture located in central Yunnan Province, China. It borders Kunming to the east, Yuxi and Pu'er City to the south, Dali Bai Autonomous Prefecture to the west, and Lijiang and Sichuan (Panzhihua and Liangshan Yi Autonomous Prefecture) to the north. Chuxiong has an area of 29,256 km^{2} (11,296 sq mi). The capital of the prefecture is Chuxiong City.

== Subdivisions ==
There are two county-level cities and eight counties.

Map
Name	Chinese	Hanyu Pinyin	Population (2020)	Area (km^{2})	Density (/km^{2})
Chuxiong City	楚雄市	Chǔxióng Shì	631,530	4,482	141
Lufeng City	禄丰市	Lùfēng Shì	366,512	3,631	101
Shuangbai County	双柏县	Shuāngbǎi Xiàn	133,884	4,045	33
Mouding County	牟定县	Móudìng Xiàn	149,437	1,494	100
Nanhua County	南华县	Nánhuá Xiàn	203,704	2,343	87
Yao'an County	姚安县	Yáo'ān Xiàn	164,165	1,803	91
Dayao County	大姚县	Dàyáo Xiàn	228,961	4,146	55
Yongren County	永仁县	Yǒngrén Xiàn	97,985	2,189	45
Yuanmou County	元谋县	Yuánmóu Xiàn	201,510	1,803	118
Wuding County	武定县	Wǔdìng Xiàn	239,059	3,322	72

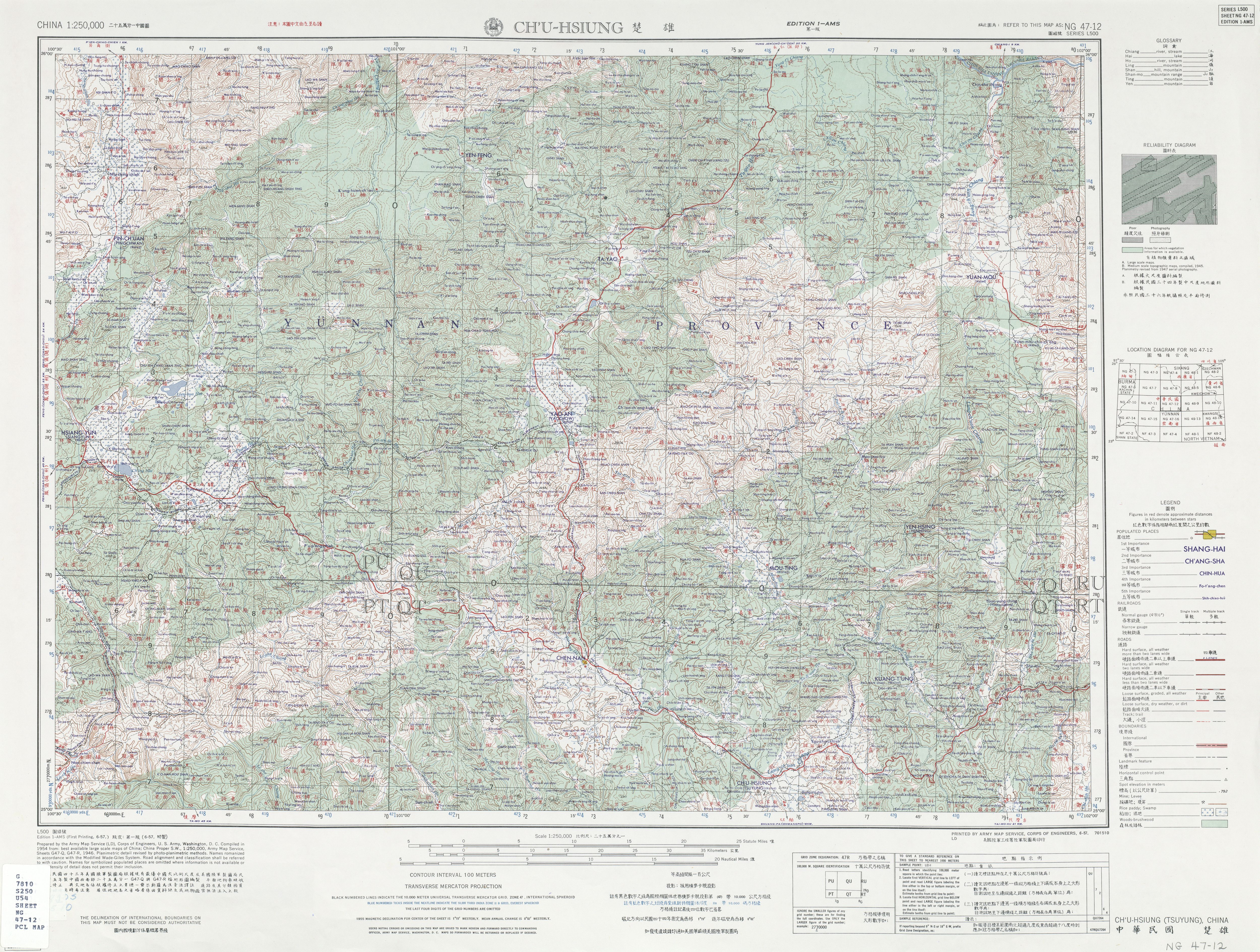
Map including Chuxiong (labeled as CH'U-HSIUNG (TSUYUNG) (Walled) 楚雄) (AMS, 1954)

== Demographics ==
As of the 2020 Chinese Census, Chuxiong Prefecture had a resident population of 2,416,747 and a population density of 90.53 inhabitants/km^{2}. The 2010 Chinese Census reported a resident population of 2,684,000, while 2000 Census recorded 2,542,530 residents.

=== Ethnic groups in Chuxiong, 2000 census ===
Nationality	Population	Percentage
Han	1,714,851	67.45%
Yi	668,937	26.31%
Lisu	51,553	2.03%
Miao	41,077	1.62%
Dai	20,514	0.81%
Hui	20,189	0.79%
Bai	15,251	0.6%
Hani	5,376	0.21
Others	4,782	0.18%
Total	2,542,530	

The Chuxiong Prefecture Almanac (1993:411) lists the following two ethnic Hani subgroups and their respective locations.

- Woni (窝尼) (in Shuangbai County and Chuxiong City): Fabiao 法脿, Dazhuang 大庄, Yulong 雨龙, Damaidi 大麦地 of Shuangbai County
- Luomian (罗缅) (in Wuding County): Nigagu 尼嘎古

The Bai language of Chuxiong is different from Bai of Dali, but the two are mutually intelligible nonetheless (Chuxiong Prefecture Almanac 1993:406)

=== Yi people ===
The Chuxiong Prefecture Ethnic Gazetteer (2013:361) lists the following 13 ethnic Yi subgroups and their respective autonyms (endonyms), exonyms, and demographic information.

Subgroup	Autonyms	Exonyms	Population	Locations
Luoluo (罗罗)	Luoluopu (罗罗濮), Luoluoru (罗罗儒), Laluopu (腊罗濮)	White Yi (白彝族), Diga (底嘎族), Gaoshan (髙山族), Alu (阿鲁), Baijiaozi (白脚子)	140,000	Chuxiong (楚雄), Nanhua (南华), Yao'an (姚安), Dayao (大姚), Yanfeng (盐丰), Mouding (牟定), Yanxing (盐兴), Guangtong (广通), Shuangbai (双柏), etc.
Lipu (俚濮)	Lipu (俚濮), Maci (骂池濮)	White Yi (白彝族), Li (黎族), Li (栗族), Maci (骂池族)	93,800	Yongren (永仁), Yanfeng (盐丰), Dayao (大姚), Yuanmou (元谋), Luquan (禄劝), Wuding (武定), etc.
Nuosu (诺苏)	Niesupu (聂苏濮)	Liangshan (凉山族), Black Yi (黑彝族), Man (蛮族), Mansan (蛮散族)	1,643	Yuanmou (元谋), Yongren (永仁), Wuding (武定), Luquan (禄劝), etc.
Nasu (纳苏)	Nasupu (纳苏濮), Nisupu (尼苏濮)	Black Yi (黑彝族), Ache (阿车族), Red Yi (红彝族), Luowu (罗武族)	120,767	Luquan (禄劝), Wuding (武定), Fumin (富民), Tianmou (天谋), Guangtong (广通), Mouding (牟定), Shuangbai (双柏), etc.
Shansu (山苏)	Shansuru (山苏儒)	Shesu (赊苏), Shansu (山苏)	37	Shuangbai (双柏)
Chesu (车苏)	Chesuru (车苏儒)	Qisupu (气苏濮)	2,769	Shuangbai (双柏)
Misaru (米撒儒)	Misaru (米撒儒)	Menghua (蒙化), Tuzu (土族), Tujia (土家)	90	Nanhua (南华), Yao'an (姚安)
Miqiepu (米切濮)	Miqiepu (米切濮)	Micha (密岔族)	7,785	Wuding (武定), Luoci (罗次), Fumin (富民), Luquan (禄劝)
Gesupu (格苏濮)	Gesupu (格苏濮)	Yi (彝族)	6,753	Yanfeng (盐丰), Wuding (武定)
Sani (撒尼)	Sanipu (撒尼濮)	Minglang (明朗族)	953	Wuding (武定), Luquan (禄劝)
Shui Yi (水彝)	Popei (婆胚)	Shuitian White Yi (水田白彝), Shui Yi (水彝族)	-	Dayao (大姚), Yongren (永仁)
Naluo (纳罗)	Naluopu (纳罗濮), Aluopu (阿罗濮)	Gan Yi (干彝族)	8,522	Wuding (武定), Luquan (禄劝), Yuanmou (元谋)
Gepu (葛濮)	Gepu (葛濮)	Gan Yi (甘彝族)	747	Luquan (禄劝), Wuding (武定)
