= Nanhua County =

Nanhua County 南华县
- County
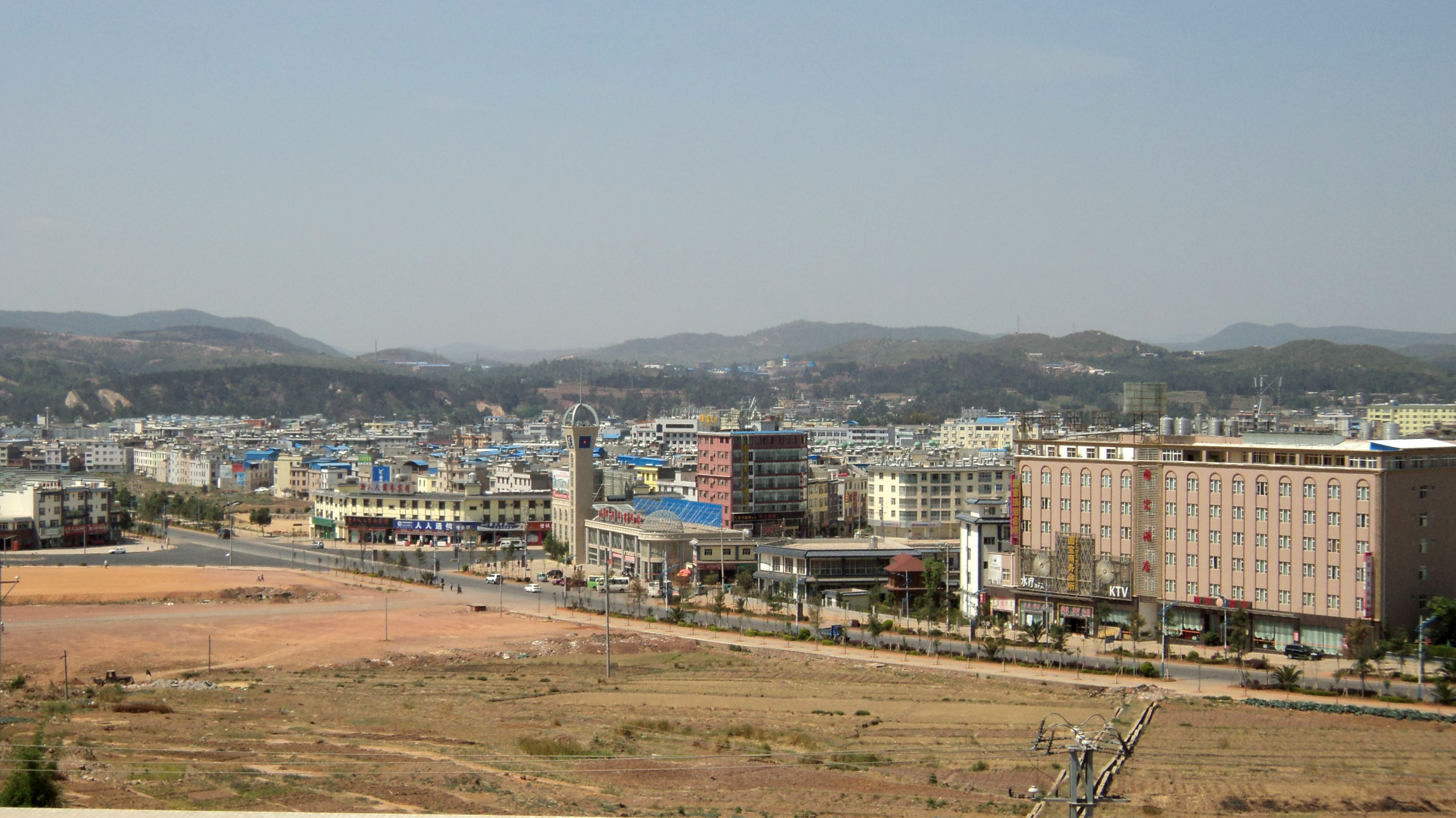

- Location of Nanhua County in Chuxiong Prefecture within Yunnan province

- Location of the seat in Yunnan
- Coordinates: 25°11′31″N 101°16′26″E
- Country: People's Republic of China
- Province: Yunnan
- Autonomous prefecture: Chuxiong

Area
  - Total: 2,343 km^{2} (905 sq mi)

Population
  - Total: 230,000
  - Density: 98/km^{2} (250/sq mi)
- Time zone: UTC+8 (CST)
- Postal code: 675200
- Area code: 0878
- Website: YNNH.gov.cn

Nanhua County (simplified Chinese: 南华县; traditional Chinese: 南華縣; pinyin: Nánhuá Xiàn; Chuxiong Yi script:, IPA: /mɯ^{21} xo^{33} bu^{33}/) is a county located in Chuxiong Yi Autonomous Prefecture, Yunnan Province, China. It is located in western Chuxiong Prefecture and borders Mouding County to the east, Chuxiong City and Jingdong County to the south, Midu County to the west, and Xiangyun County and Yao'an County to the north.

== Administrative divisions ==
Nanhua County has 6 towns, 3 townships and 1 ethnic township.

6 towns

- Longchuan (龙川镇)
- Shaqiao (沙桥镇)
- Wujie (五街镇)
- Hongtupo (红土坡镇)
- Majie (马街镇)
- Tujie (兔街镇)

3 townships

- Yijie (一街乡)
- Luowuzhuang (罗武庄乡)
- Wudingshan (五顶山乡)

1 ethnic township

- Yulou Bai (雨露白族乡)

== Climate ==
Climate data for Nanhua, elevation 1,905 m (6,250 ft), (1991–2020 normals, extremes 1981–present)
Month	Jan	Feb	Mar	Apr	May	Jun	Jul	Aug	Sep	Oct	Nov	Dec	Year
Record high °C (°F)	24.7 (76.5)	25.1 (77.2)	29.1 (84.4)	30.6 (87.1)	33.0 (91.4)	31.5 (88.7)	30.8 (87.4)	30.4 (86.7)	30.3 (86.5)	28.2 (82.8)	27.5 (81.5)	22.8 (73.0)	33.0 (91.4)
Mean daily maximum °C (°F)	16.9 (62.4)	19.0 (66.2)	22.0 (71.6)	24.7 (76.5)	26.0 (78.8)	26.4 (79.5)	25.4 (77.7)	25.3 (77.5)	24.1 (75.4)	22.2 (72.0)	19.6 (67.3)	17.0 (62.6)	22.4 (72.3)
Daily mean °C (°F)	7.6 (45.7)	9.9 (49.8)	13.1 (55.6)	16.3 (61.3)	19.3 (66.7)	20.9 (69.6)	20.4 (68.7)	19.7 (67.5)	18.2 (64.8)	15.7 (60.3)	11.2 (52.2)	7.9 (46.2)	15.0 (59.0)
Mean daily minimum °C (°F)	0.1 (32.2)	1.7 (35.1)	4.7 (40.5)	8.2 (46.8)	12.9 (55.2)	16.4 (61.5)	16.9 (62.4)	16.1 (61.0)	14.5 (58.1)	11.4 (52.5)	5.4 (41.7)	1.4 (34.5)	9.1 (48.5)
Record low °C (°F)	−7.8 (18.0)	−4.6 (23.7)	−3.4 (25.9)	−0.1 (31.8)	4.8 (40.6)	10.3 (50.5)	11.0 (51.8)	9.8 (49.6)	5.5 (41.9)	3.0 (37.4)	−2.6 (27.3)	−6.9 (19.6)	−7.8 (18.0)
Average precipitation mm (inches)	18.6 (0.73)	9.5 (0.37)	15.4 (0.61)	22.5 (0.89)	66.7 (2.63)	134.7 (5.30)	165.9 (6.53)	178.0 (7.01)	117.7 (4.63)	67.1 (2.64)	24.8 (0.98)	10.1 (0.40)	831 (32.72)
Average precipitation days (≥ 0.1 mm)	3.9	3.5	5.1	6.3	9.6	13.0	18.9	19.8	15.8	11.6	5.4	3.4	116.3
Average snowy days	0.4	0.1	0.1	0	0	0	0	0	0	0	0.1	0.2	0.9
Average relative humidity (%)	69	62	59	60	65	76	82	85	85	82	78	76	73
Mean monthly sunshine hours	238.1	235.8	262.7	259.5	239.8	185.1	143.5	151.3	142.2	166.7	204.1	211.2	2,440
Percentage possible sunshine	71	74	70	68	58	45	34	38	39	47	63	65	56
Source: China Meteorological Administrationall-time November record high
