= List of lesser-known Loloish languages =

Listed below are lesser-known ethnolinguistic groups that speak Loloish languages. Most of these groups speak languages of uncertain affiliation within Loloish, and are under-documented or undocumented.

== List of languages and ethnic groups ==
Lesser-known Loloish ethnolinguistic groups
| Ethnolinguistic group | Population | Linguistic affiliation | Locations |
|---|---|---|---|
| A Che 阿车 | 35,000 | Southern Yi (ISO 639-3: yif) | Shuangbai County (pop. 23,000) and Yimen County (pop. 11,100) of Chuxiong Prefecture. Autonym in Xinping County (pop. 100+ (1955)): nei³³su³³pʰɯ²¹ |
| Adu 阿笃 | 6,500+ | Form of Chinese similar to the Dajie District dialect of Jiangchuan County, and the Zijun dialect of Kunming | Huaning County (pop. 3,500) in Songzichang 松子厂, Xinzhai 新寨, Douju 斗居, and Chengmentong 城门同; Haikou District 海口镇 in Chengjiang County (pop. 2,025) |
| Aling 阿灵 | 5,500 | Eastern Yi; similar to Da Hei Neisu and Xiao Hei Neisu | Shizong County (pop. 5,600) in Yimai 矣麦, Faza 法杂, Chezhai 扯寨, Musheluo 木舍落/木舌落, Yinie 矣捏, Yijia 遗甲, Shugandian 束干甸/束米甸, and Dashao 大哨; Longhai Mountains of Luliang County (pop. 2,400); Shilin County: Guishan 圭山乡 (mostly in Yumeidu Village 雨美堵村), Muzhuqing 亩竹箐乡, and Dake 大可乡 townships |
| Alu 阿鲁 (Luwu 鲁乌, Luowu 倮乌) | 5,500 (China); 1,407 (Laos) | Southern Yi | Hama Village 哈马, Huangcaoling Township 黄草岭乡, Yuanyang County; Laojizhai Township 老集寨乡, Jinping County; possibly Simao Prefecture, Jiangcheng County (people also called Alu); Gnot-Ou District, Phongsali Province, Laos. Autonym of the Luowu 罗武 in Xinping County (pop. 300+ (1955); 100 households in Shuangbai County; also in Zhenyuan County): ni³³su³³pʰo³³ |
| Apu 阿普 | 2,500 | Unclassified | Western Ma'andi Township 马鞍底乡, Jinping County. Also known as Bokho, po21 kʰo55 |
| Ati 阿梯 | 12,600 (1999) | Southeastern Yi | Huaning County; smaller numbers also in Jianshui County |
| Awu 阿邬 | | Unclassified | Xiaopingzi 小坪子, Daping Township 大坪乡, Yuanyang County |
| Awu, Northern 阿乌(北) | 3,500 | Northern Yi, related to Xiaoliangshan Nosu, Talu, Liwu, Tagu, and Naza | Peiyuan 培元村, Shuiping 水坪村, and Yongle 永乐村 Villages of Da'an Township 大安彝族纳西族乡, Yongsheng County |
| Ayizi 阿夷子 (Ge) | 426 (1986) | Eastern Yi or Southeastern Yi? (ISO 639-3: yyz, ELP) | Shilin County: Aimailongcun Village 爱买龙, Beidacun Township 北大村乡; also in Banqiao Township 板桥乡, and other parts of Beidacun 北大村乡 |
| Azong 阿宗 | 1,000 | Southern Yi or Western Yi? | Jiangcheng County |
| Bubeng 布崩 | 100 | Southern | Spoken in Mengla County by 15 households, near the Khabit area (You 2013:173) |
| Budo 布度 | 10,000+ | Bi-Ka branch, closely related to Biyo and Kado; people classified as Hani | Ailao Mountains 哀牢山, Mojiang County and Yuanjiang County; possibly also Xinping County |
| Chesu 车苏 | 6,600 | Southern Yi, similar to Lesu; the Chesu claim that their language is not a Yi language (ISO 639-3: ych) | Southern Shuangbai County, northern Xinping County. Ethnologue also lists Eshan County. Used as L2 by Hlersu speakers. Autonym: tsu su³³pa²¹ or tɕi²¹su⁵⁵pʰo²¹ (Jishupo 吉输颇). Located mostly in Taihe Township 太和乡, with a population of over 360 as of 1955. Bradley (2007) reports that it is closely related to Nasu, but is being replaced by Nisu. |
| Daizhan 带占 | 11,600 | Southeastern Yi, related to Puwa, Digao, Asahei, Ani, and Labapo | Beige Township 碑格乡, Kaiyuan County. Phowa according to Pelkey (2011). |
| Depo 得颇 (Adou[puo], Gan Yi) | 6,000 | Eastern Nasu? | Panzhihua, Sichuan |
| Doupo 都泼 | 600+ | Eastern Nasu? | Mafang Village 马房, Fumin County (pop. 400), Guanshanchang Village 官山场, Qinglong Township 青龙镇, Anning County (pop. 200). Also known as the Yellow Yi 黄彝. They consider themselves to be separate from the Depo 德颇 (pop. 6,000) of northern Yunnan and southern Sichuan, who are also called Adoupo 阿斗泼 or Dry Yi 干彝. |
| Duota 多它 | 11,000+ | Southern Yi or Northern Yi?; speakers variously classified as Yi and Hani | Mojiang County, Yuanjiang County |
| Enipu 厄尼蒲 | 16,000+ | Lolopo | Nanjian County (pop. 11,000): Wanubu 瓦怒卜, Baishajing 白沙井, and Laojiaku 老家库 Villages of Xinmin Township 新民, and Ertaipo 二台坡 Villages, Langcang Township 浪沧乡; Weishan County (pop. 5,000): Yinchang 银厂村, Qinghe 青和村, Qingmin 箐民村, and Wuxing 五星村 Villages of Qinghua Township 青华乡. The term Enipu is pejorative, as it is a term used by the Lalo that means 'water buffalo'. |
| Gaiji 改积 | 30,000 | Western Yi | Central Yun County |
| Gaisu, Southern 改苏(南) (Bailili, Luozu) | 35,000 | Southern Yi | Eastern Kaiyuan County (pop. 35,000); small portion of Gejiu County (pop. 1,400) |
| Gaisu, Western 改苏(西) (Luoren) | 1,000 | Western Yi? | Northeastern Yongde County; possibly in Myanmar |
| Gepo, Western 葛泼(西) | 6,500 | Western Yi? | Liuhe Township 六合彝族乡, Heqing County |
| Gese 葛色 | 12,000 | Eastern Yi; most of their neighbors speak Central Yi and Western Yi languages | Lufeng County: Eastern Tuo'an Township 妥安乡, Southern Gaofeng Township 高峰乡 |
| Gesu 葛苏 | 12,000 | Central Yi? | Dayao County, Wuding County |
| Gouzou 构邹 | 4,000 | Eastern Yi | Weining County, Guizhou |
| Guaigun 乖滚 | 400 | Southern Yi or Southeastern Yi?; unclassified | Southern Zhenyuan County: Tianba 田坝村, Sanhe/Santai 三合村/三台村, Lianhe 联合村, and Minjiang 民江村 of Tianba Township 田坝乡. Guaigun is now extinct. Hsiu (2017) reported that Guaigun is a pejorative term given to them by other ethnic groups due to their poverty. Ethnic Guaigun people live in Xiongxing 熊姓 hamlet, Sanhe Village 三合村; Datian 大田 hamlet, Lianhe Village 联合村; and also some in Minqiang 民强. |
| Guopu 果铺 (Guoluo) | 16,900 | Eastern Yi | Weining County, in the Wumeng Mountains |
| Labapo 腊拔泼 | 6,400 (1999) | Southeastern Yi; classified as Aza | Kaiyuan County: more than 20 villages in Beige 碑格乡 and Dazhuang 大庄回族乡 Townships. Phowa according to Pelkey (2011). |
| Lagou 腊勾 | 8,000+ | Same as Nasu?; former slaves of the Nasu people | Weining County (pop. 6,000+), Yiliang County of Zhaotong Prefecture (pop. 2000) |
| Laka 腊卡 | 6,000+ | Same as Naluo?; subgroup of the Naluo people | Wuding County |
| Lami 腊米 | 100,000 | Western Yi; mostly classified as Yi, some as Hani | Yuanyang County (in Habo 哈播村), Pu'er County, 5 other counties; northern Vietnam |
| Laopang 劳旁 | 12,000 | Lahu? | Yongde or Yongkang; northern Myanmar |
| Laowu 老乌 | 6,300 (1999) | Southern Yi | Western Jinping County |
| Lemo 勒墨 | 2,000+ | Lisu and Tai Mao mixed language, or Chinese?; classified as Lisu | Lemo 勒墨寨, Pianma Township 片马镇, 78 km (48 mi.) from Liuku Township 六库镇 (the seat of Nujiang Prefecture), along the Nujiang River. Bai dialect according to Wang Feng (2012). |
| Liude 六得 | 1,400; 500 | Northern Yi, with Xiaoliangshan Nosu influences?; closely related to Talu people | Yongsheng County: 3 villages of Liude Township 六德乡 |
| Liwu 里乌 | 4,300 | Northern Yi | Yongsheng County: Liang'e 良峨 and Jifu 吉福 Villages of Xinghu Township 星湖村 |
| Long 弄 | 1,300 | Southeastern Yi | Huaning County: 5 villages (Kazhai 卡寨, Sheyin 舍阴寨, Shemuduo 舍木多村, Suojigou 所基沟, and Pusulu 普苏鲁) in Xingcheng Township 新城村 |
| Lopi (Shuitian 水田) | Essentially extinct (ethnicity: 15,000+) | Central Yi (ISO 639-3: lov) | Panzhihua, Sichuan: Futian 福田 and Pingjiang 平江 Townships; northern Yunnan |
| Maci | 100 | Central Ngwi | Maci village 骂池, Taipingdi Village Cluster 太平地村, Yongding City 永定镇, northeastern Yongren County |
| Meng 孟 | 4,000 | Akha branch | Shuangjiang County |
| Mengwu 孟武 | 1,379 | Central Yi? | Population: 8,000 in Funing County; 7,000 in Guangnan County; 2,000 in Xichou County; 1,200 in Malipo County. Maguan County and Xichou County (You 2013:135-136). The autonym is Mo 嚜, the Dai refer to them as Pumeng 普孟, and the Han Chinese refer to them as Mengwu 孟武. They claim to have migrated from Weishan County 巍山县, Yunnan over 100 years ago. |
| Michi 米切 (Michia) | 29,700 | Central Yi, Eastern Yi, Southeastern Yi? | Northern Yunnan (mostly in Wuding County; also in Fumin, Lufeng, Luquan, Yimen, and Anning Counties) and Panzhihua, Sichuan |
| Minglang 明廊 | 1,500+ | Related to Sani | Wuding County: Lower Lemei Village 下乐美 of Chadian Township 插甸乡, and Tianxin Village 田心 of Gaoqiao Township 高桥镇; Maoshan Township 茂山乡, Luquan County; probably also Fumin County. It is related to but unintelligible with Sani. |
| Mixisu 米习俗 | 5,000 | Northern Yi | Xichang County and Mianning County |
| Naru 纳儒; Naruo 纳若 (Zhili) | 11,500+; may be the same as Xiaoliangshan Nosu | Northern Yi | Southern and Central Yongsheng County (pop. 7,000), Southern Huaping County (pop. 4,500) |
| Naza 纳咱 | 1,300+ | Northern Yi? | Nazan Village 纳咱, Liude Village 六德村, Liude Township 六德乡, Yongsheng County. Also 2 villages in Liude Township, and a few in Banqiao Township. |
| Pengzi 棚子 | 250 | Western Yi? | Wumulong Township 乌木龙彝族乡 (and possibly also Mengban Township 勐板乡), Yongde County |
| Popei 泼胚 | 3,000 - 5,000 | Similar to Central Luoluopo | Huaping County (pop. 1,000; several villages), Dayao and Yongren Counties; small pockets in nearby regions |
| Qiangyi 羌夷 | 10,000 | Lolopo | Xiangyun County (pop. 9,000): Xiangme 香么村, Ziqianglang 自羌朗村, Huangcaoshao 黄草哨村, Chuchang 楚场村, and Chalangshao 插朗哨村 Villages of Midian Township 米甸彝族镇; Daying 大营村 and Xinxingzuo 新兴苴村 Villages of Hedian Township 禾甸乡; Binchuan County (pop. 1,000) |
| Samadu, Western 撒马堵(西) | 7,500 (1999) | Western Yi? | Zhenkang County (pop. 6,000), Yongde County (pop. 1,500). Sinicized group. |
| Sanda 散达 | 1,000 (1996) | Related to Jino and Ake? | Between Jinghong and Menglian Counties: 6 villages in the Sanda Mountains (between Jinghong and Menglian) |
| Suan 蒜 | 250 | Western Yi? | Yongde County: Wumulong Township 乌木龙彝族乡 and Mengban Township 勐板乡; neighbors with the Pengzi people |
| Ta'er 塔尔 | 1,000 | Northern Yi | Ninglang County |
| Tazhi | Few hundred | Central Ngwi | Puwei Township 普威镇, northern Miyi County 米易县, Sichuan. A few hundred people who claim they came from northern Yunnan centuries ago. Moribund or extinct; perhaps related to Talu, Tagu or other languages of Yongsheng County. |
| Tushu 土数 | 5,000+ | Eastern Yi | Weining County, Yiliang County of Zhaotong Prefecture |
| Tusu 土族 | 31,000 | Lolopo | Xiangyun County: Da'aonai Village 大敖奶村/大凹奈村 of Luming Township 鹿鸣乡; Jindan 金单村, Zhifang 支方村, and Dacang 大仓村 Villages of Xiazhuang Township 下庄镇; Jiangwei Village 江尾村 of Pupeng Township 普棚镇; Dongshan Township 东山乡; Dayao County (in Baiyangdi Village 白羊地村 in Sanchahe Township 三岔河乡, and in Tiesuo Township 铁锁乡) and Binchuan County |
| Woni 窝尼 | 110,000 | Bi-Ka branch; people classified as Hani, but may be an assimilated Mon-Khmer group | Mojiang, Pu'er, and Simao Counties |
| Wopu 窝普 | 3,000+ | Eastern Yi; may be similar to Da Hei Neisu | Xingyi County of Guizhou, Luoping County of Yunnan; possibly also Longlin or Xilin Counties of Guangxi |
| Xiangtang 香堂 | 80,000 | Lolopo | 9 scattered counties of southwestern Yunnan; far-western Lüchun County. Also about 4,000 speakers in northwestern Yongsheng County (about 4,000) and a few hundred in eastern Lijiang; closely related to Lolo. |
| Xijima 洗期麻 | 30,000 | Western Yi | Central Yun County |
| Xiqi 西期 | 13,000 | Southeastern Yi | Huaning County, Yuxi Prefecture: Tonghongdian Township 通红甸乡 (in Suomeizao 所梅早村 and Dapozuo 大婆左村), Panxi Township 盘溪镇 (in and around Yide 矣得村, Fagao 法高村, Dayaxi 大丫喜村, and Longtanying 龙潭营村), Huaxi Township 华溪镇 (in and around Xishajing 西沙井村 and Dujiacun 独家村), Qinglong Township 青龙镇 (in Shanzhi 山枝村 and Qize 起则村), Chengjia Township 陈家乡 (on Denglou Mountain 登楼山) |
| Yiche 以车 | 19,000 | Similar to Hani; people classified as Hani | Honghe Prefecture: Chegu 车古乡, Langdi 浪堤乡, and Dayangjie 大羊街乡 Townships |

Yunnan (1979) lists the following ethnolinguistic groups that are classified as Yi.

- Mengwu 孟武 (exonym: Awu 阿武) of Xichou County. Population: 1,243 as of 1960. Yunnan (1979) lists Mengwu 孟武 twice, and in another entry lists Mengwu 孟武 of Maguan County and Xichou County with a population of 1,379. Also known as Lai (俫) (autonym; a branch of the Awu 阿武, also called Mengwu 孟武): in Xisa 西洒镇, Xichou; Daping 大坪镇 and Nanwenhe 南温河乡 of Malipo.
- Sanda 三达 of Dazhai, Sanda Township, Jinghong City (景洪市三达乡大寨). There were only 2 elderly women who remembered about 40 words. Yunnan (1979) classifies Sanda as a Yi language, but also notes that it has many words of Hani origin. The Sanda have no autonym. Population: 946 as of 1960.
- Datou 达头 of Pu'er and Simao. Population: 254 as of 1960. Their traditions and festivals are similar to those of the Yi people of Weishan County.
- Aciga 阿次嘎 of Lancang County. Spoken in Yakou Township 雅口乡 and Nanxian Township 南现乡 (now Nuozhadu Town 糯扎渡镇). Population: 50 as of 1960. 100 years ago, they had migrated from Niujian Mountain 牛肩山, Zhenyue County 镇越县 (now renamed as Mengla County), and had spoken a different language that is now extinct. They now speak Chinese and Yi. Aciga is an exonym, as the Aciga do not have an autonym.

A Yi language called Zhayipo 扎依颇 (dza²¹ʑi²¹pʰo²¹) is spoken in Mile County.

Lewu of Jingdong Yi Autonomous County, Yunnan is an extinct Loloish language.

== Notes and references ==
- Lama, Ziwo Qiu-Fuyuan (2012), Subgrouping of Nisoic (Yi) Languages, thesis, University of Texas at Arlington (archived)
- Yunnan provincial ethnic classification research unit [云南省民族识别研究组]. 1956. Preliminary summary of ethnic classifications in Yunnan province: no. 1, 2 [云南省民族识别研究第一、二阶段初步总结]. Beijing: Central University for Nationalities Research Institute 中央民族学院.
