= Lisoish languages =

Branch of the Loloish languages

Lisoish
- Central Loloish
- Geographic distribution: Southern China, Mainland Southeast Asia, South Asia
- Linguistic classification: Sino-Tibetan: Tibeto-Burman; Lolo–Burmese; Loloish; Lisoish

Language codes
- Glottolog: liso1234

The Lisoish languages are a branch of the Loloish languages proposed by Ziwo Lama (2012) that includes Lisu and several of the Yi languages. David Bradley (1997) considers Lisoish languages to be part of the Central Loloish branch.

== Languages and classifications ==
=== Lama (2012) ===
- Lisoish
  - Lipo, Lolopo, Hlersu (Shansu)
  - - Toloza (Tanglang)
    - - Lisu
      - Lalo (Laluba), Lavu (+ other Taloid languages)

David Bradley (2007) considers Lisu, Lipo, and Lamu to form a Lisoid subgroup.

Other Lisoish languages are:

- Miqie (Micha)
- Lamu
- Limi
- Lalo languages: Lalo, Yangliu, Eka, Mangdi, Xuzhang
- Taloid languages: Talu, Lavu, Lang'e, Tagu, Popei, Naruo, Kua-nsi, Kuamasi, Laizisi, Zibusi, Sonaga, Gomotage

The following two of the six Yi languages (fangyan 方言) officially recognized by the Chinese government belong to Lama's Lisoish clade. (The remaining four are Nisoish.)

- Western Yi (Lalo 腊罗)
- Central Yi (Lolopo 倮倮泼)

Names for Lolopo varieties include Enipu 厄尼蒲, Qiangyi 羌夷, Tuzu 土族, and Xiangtang 香堂.

=== Chen (2010) ===
Chen (2010) lists the following dialects for "Lolo" (倮倮) languages, which corresponds to Lama's (2012) Lisoish clade. The position of Lisu is not addressed. Also listed are the counties where each respective dialect is spoken.

Lolo 倮倮方言

- Lolo, Luóluó 倮倮次方言 (lo̠21lo̠33pʰo21): 600,000 speakers in all counties of Chuxiong Yi Autonomous Prefecture
- Lalu, Làlǔ 腊鲁次方言
  - Lalu, Làlǔ 腊鲁 (la21lu̠33pa21): 250,000 speakers in Dali, Weishan, Midu, Yongping, Baoshan, etc.
  - Lalo, Làluó 腊罗 (la21lo̠21ɣɑ55ly55): 250,000 speakers in Dali, Weishan, Yunxian, Changning, Nanjian, Lincang, Shuangjiang, Midu, Jingdong, Jinggu, etc.
- Lipo, Lǐpō 里泼次方言
  - Lipo, Lǐpō 里泼 (li33pʰo21): 200,000 speakers in Luquan, Wuding, Yongsheng, Huaping, etc.
  - Lavu, Lāwù 拉务 (la21u21): 50,000 speakers in Yongsheng
  - Talu, Tǎlǔ 塔鲁 (tʰa21lu55): 50,000 speakers in Yongsheng, Huaping, and Ninglang.
  - Toloza, Tánglángràng 堂郎让 (tʰo33lo33za33): 2,000+ speakers in Tai'an Township, Lijiang County

=== Hsiu (2016) ===
Below is a classification of the Lisoish languages by Hsiu (2016) based on a phylogenetic analysis of selected lexical isoglosses.

- Lisoish
  - Toloza
  - Lavu, Talu
  - Heqing cluster
    - Kua-nsi
    - Kuamasi, Laizisi, Zibusi
    - Sonaga
  - Lolopo linkage
    - Hlersu / Shansu
    - Luquan Lisu (Lipha)
    - Lolo(po)
    - Lipo
    - ? Tu / Tuzu / Tujia
    - Tulao of Jinping (?)
    - ? Qiangyi
    - ? Xiangtang
  - Lisu
  - Mili
  - Limi
  - Lalo
    - Alu
    - Eka
    - Mangdi
    - Xuzhang-Lalo
      - Xuzhang
      - Lalo
        - Eastern
        - Central, Western

=== Other languages ===
The Chuxiong Prefecture Ethnic Gazetteer (2013:364) lists the following cognate percentages between Lolopo 罗罗濮 and other Yi languages in Chuxiong Prefecture.

- Ache 阿车: 74.86% (211/282)
- Chesu 车苏: 55% (155/282)
- Luowu 罗武: 75.89% (214/282)
- Shansu 山苏: 78.4% (221/282)
- Lipo 里濮: 93.36% (253/271)

Yang, et al. (2017) lists the following languages as part of the Taloid branch, whose speakers are descendants of soldiers sent by the Nanzhao Kingdom from the Dali region to be stationed in northwestern Yunnan. Taloid languages are most closely related to Lalo, Lolopo, and Lipo, all of which share the lexical innovation a¹to^{L} for 'fire'. They are spoken primarily in Yongsheng County and Heqing County. Popei 泼佩 is spoken in Huaping County, while Gomotage is spoken in Eryuan County.

- Talu 他留, Nazan 纳咱
- Lang'e 崀峨, Lawu 拉务
- Tagu 塔古
- Popei 泼佩 (Shuitian 水田)
- Naruo 纳若 (Shuitian 水田)
- Kua-nsi 跨恩斯
- Kuamasi 跨玛斯
- Laizisi 莱兹斯
- Zibusi 子逋斯
- Sonaga 锁内嘎
- Gomotage 俄毛柔

Tazhi of Puwei Township 普威镇, northern Miyi County 米易县, Sichuan may also be a Taloid language.

Cathryn Yang (2010:7) also suggests that Wotizo (wɔ21 ti33 zɔ21) of Midu County may probably be related to Lolo (Lolopo).

Cathryn Yang (2010) lists the following 4 languages as peripheral Lalo languages. Hsiu (2017) suggests that Alu is also likely a peripheral Lalo language.

- Yangliu
- Eka
- Mangdi
- Xuzhang

Bradley (2007) reports the moribund language Samatu as a Laloid language.

Tulao (土老) of Jinping County (spoken in the 2 villages of Yugadi 鱼嘎底, Xinzhai Village 新寨村, Mengqiao Township 勐桥乡; and Laowangzhai 老王寨, Qingjiao Village 箐脚村, Dazhai Township 大寨乡) may fit in the Lisoish branch, although this is uncertain due to lack of data.

Other languages that may be Lisoish include (see also List of lesser-known Loloish languages):

- Gaiji 改积 of central Yun County
- Gaisu, Western 改苏(西) (Luoren) of northeastern Yongde County
- Gepo, Western 葛泼(西) of Liuhe Township 六合彝族乡, Heqing County
- Pengzi 棚子 of Wumulong Township 乌木龙彝族乡 (and possibly also Mengban Township 勐板乡), Yongde County
- Suan 蒜 of Wumulong Township 乌木龙彝族乡 and Mengban Township 勐板乡, Yongde County
- Western Samadu 撒马堵(西) of Zhenkang County (pop. 6,000), Yongde County (pop. 1,500)

Lolopo varieties:

- Enipu 厄尼蒲 of Nanjian County (pop. 11,000) and Weishan County (pop. 5,000)
- Maci 骂池 of Maci village 骂池, Taipingdi Village Cluster 太平地村, Yongding City 永定镇, northeastern Yongren County
- Qiangyi 羌夷 of Xiangyun County (pop. 9,000) and Binchuan County (pop. 1,000)
- Tusu 土族 of Xiangyun County
- Xiangtang 香堂 of southwestern Yunnan
- Xijima 洗期麻 of central Yun County

Below are autonyms of Central Yi (彝语中部方言) speakers as listed in the Yunnan Province Ethnic Minority Languages Gazetteer (1997) (云南省志：少数民族语言文字志; p. 57):

- lo22 lo33 pʰo21 (Lolopo language)
- li33 pʰo21 (Lipo language)
- mi˥tɕʰe21 pʰo21 (Micha language)
- kɚ33sɨ33 pʰo21
- ɬɚ33su pʰo21 (Shansu language)

== Innovations ==
Lama (2012) lists the following sound changes from Proto-Loloish as Lisoish innovations.

- *m- > zero
- *m- > p-
