= Lamu language =

Endangered Loloish language of China

Lamu
- Native to: China
- Region: Yunnan
- Ethnicity: 300 (2007)
- Native speakers: 120 (2007)
- Language family: Sino-Tibetan: (Tibeto-Burman); Lolo–Burmese; Loloish; Lisoish; Lisu–Lalo ?; Micha; Lamu

Language codes
- ISO 639-3: llh
- Glottolog: lamu1257
- ELP: Lamu

Lamu (Lamo; autonym: la21 mu33) is a highly endangered Loloish language of northeastern Binchuan County, Yunnan. According to Bradley (2007), the Lamo language is similar to Lisu and Lipo, although the speakers are classified by the Chinese government as ethnic Lahu. There are only about 100 speakers left, all of whom are also first-language speakers of Lipo. Lamo speakers were located by Bradley in 1999.

== Demographics ==
Lamu is spoken in 5 villages of Zhongying Township 钟英傈僳族乡 in the northeastern corner of Binchuan County, Dali Prefecture, Yunnan, China. In all 5 villages, the Lipo (officially classified as Lisu) are the majority while the Lamu are the minority. There are also some Lolo speakers (officially classified as Yi) in the area. Most Lamu speakers have non-Lamu spouses. According to Bradley (2004), the Central Ngwi homeland may be in the Lamu area.
