= Taloid languages =

Lolo-Burmese language cluster

Taloid
- Geographic distribution: Yunnan, China
- Ethnicity: Yi
- Linguistic classification: Sino-Tibetan: (Tibeto-Burman); Lolo–Burmese; Loloish; Lisoish; Lalo–Lavu; Taloid

Language codes
- Glottolog: kuan1251 ((partial))

Taloid is a cluster of languages in the Lisoish branch of Lolo–Burmese.

== Languages ==
Yang, et al. (2017) lists the following languages as belonging to the Taloid cluster of languages, whose speakers are descendants of soldiers sent by the Nanzhao Kingdom from the Dali region to be stationed in northwestern Yunnan. Taloid languages are most closely related to Lalo, Lolopo, and Lipo, all of which share the lexical innovation a¹to^{L} for 'fire'. They are spoken primarily in Yongsheng County and Heqing County. Popei 泼佩 is spoken in Huaping County, while Gomotage is spoken in Eryuan County.

- Talu 他留, Nazan 纳咱
- Lang'e 崀峨, Lavu 拉务
- Tagu 塔古
- Popei 泼佩 (Shuitian 水田)
- Naruo 纳若 (Shuitian 水田)
- Kua-nsi 跨恩斯
- Kuamasi 跨玛斯
- Laizisi 莱兹斯
- Zibusi 子逋斯
- Sonaga 锁内嘎
- Gomotage 俄毛柔

Andy Castro, et al. (2010) have reported the discovery of 5 languages in Heqing County, Yunnan that are most closely related to Talu (他留话) of Yongsheng County. Autonyms are from Castro (2010:25). Sonaga is the most divergent, while the other four languages comprise a core subclade.

- Kua-nsi (khua33 n̩21 sɨ55; 跨恩斯话): 5,000+ speakers
- Kuamasi (khua33 ma33 sɨ55; 跨玛斯话)
- Laizisi (lai21 dzɨ̠55 sɨ55; 莱兹斯话)
- Zibusi (zɨ21 pu55 sɨ55; 子逋斯话)
- Sonaga (so21 na33 ka̠33; 锁内嘎话): 2,000+ speakers

Gomotage (ɣɔ21 mɔ33 ta55 ɣə21; also known as ɣɔ31 mɔ33 zɔ31 or Emaorou 俄毛柔) of Eryuan County is also probably related to Kua-nsi (Yang 2010:7).

Other languages that may belong to the Taloid cluster include:

- Awu, Northern 阿乌(北): 3,000 speakers in Peiyuan 培元村, Shuiping 水坪村, and Yongle 永乐村 Villages of Da'an Township 大安彝族纳西族乡, Yongsheng County
- Liude 六得: 500 speakers in 3 villages of Liude Township 六德乡, Yongsheng County.
- Liwu 里乌: 4,000 speakers in Yongsheng County, in Liang'e 良峨 and Jifu 吉福 Villages of Xinghu Township 星湖村
- Tazhi: spoken by a few hundred people in Puwei Township 普威镇, northern Miyi County 米易县, Sichuan. The Tazhi claim they came from northern Yunnan centuries ago. It is moribund or extinct, and is perhaps related to Talu, Tagu, or other languages of Yongsheng County.
- Ta'er 塔尔 of Ninglang County, spoken by about 1,000 people

== Innovations ==
Some Taloid lexical innovations are:

- head hair (头发) > fur (毛) + hair (头发)
- 'sky' > my²di¹mo³
- 'mouth' > kʰa²bi²

Taloid phonological innovations are:

- *a > u
- *ak > a̱
- *(-)rwe > ua
- *(-)r/way > ua
