= Zibusi language =

Loloish language of Yunnan, China

Zibusi
- Native to: China
- Region: Yunnan
- Language family: Sino-Tibetan: (Tibeto-Burman); Lolo–Burmese; Loloish; Lisoish; Lalo–Lavu; Taloid; Heqing Yi; Zibusi

Language codes
- ISO 639-3: None (mis)
- Glottolog: None

Zibusi (zɨ21 pu55 sɨ55; Chinese: 子逋斯话; Daqing Yi 大箐彝) is a Loloish language of Heqing County, Yunnan, China. They are known by the Kua-nsi as zɨ21 pɯ55 sɨ55. The Zibusi are found in Shangshiyan 上石岩, Daqing Village 大箐村, Duomei Township 朵美乡, Heqing County (Castro, et al. 2010); the sɨ21 pʰɨ̪21 sɨ55 are located in Jidiping 吉地坪, Moguang Village 磨光村, Jindun Township 金墩乡.
