= Kuamasi language =

Loloish language of Yunnan, China

Kuamasi
- Native to: China
- Region: Yunnan
- Native speakers: 1,000 (2011)
- Language family: Sino-Tibetan: (Tibeto-Burman); Lolo–Burmese; Loloish; Lisoish; Lalo–Lavu; Taloid; Heqing Yi; Kuamasi

Language codes
- ISO 639-3: yku
- Glottolog: kuam1234

Kuamasi (kʰua33 ma33 sɨ55; Chinese: 跨玛斯话; Songping Yi 松坪彝) is a Loloish language of Heqing County, Yunnan, China. They are known by the Kua-nsi as kʰua33 ma33 sɨ55. The Kuamasi are found in Matang 麻塘, Songping Village 松坪村, Liuhe Township 六合乡, Heqing County (Castro, et al. 2010). A Loloish language spoken in Daying Village 大营村, Songgui Town 松桂镇 is also likely closely related to Kuamasi (Castro 2010:23).
