= Dadan River =

River in Yunnan, China

Coordinates: 26°11′24″N 100°34′31″E

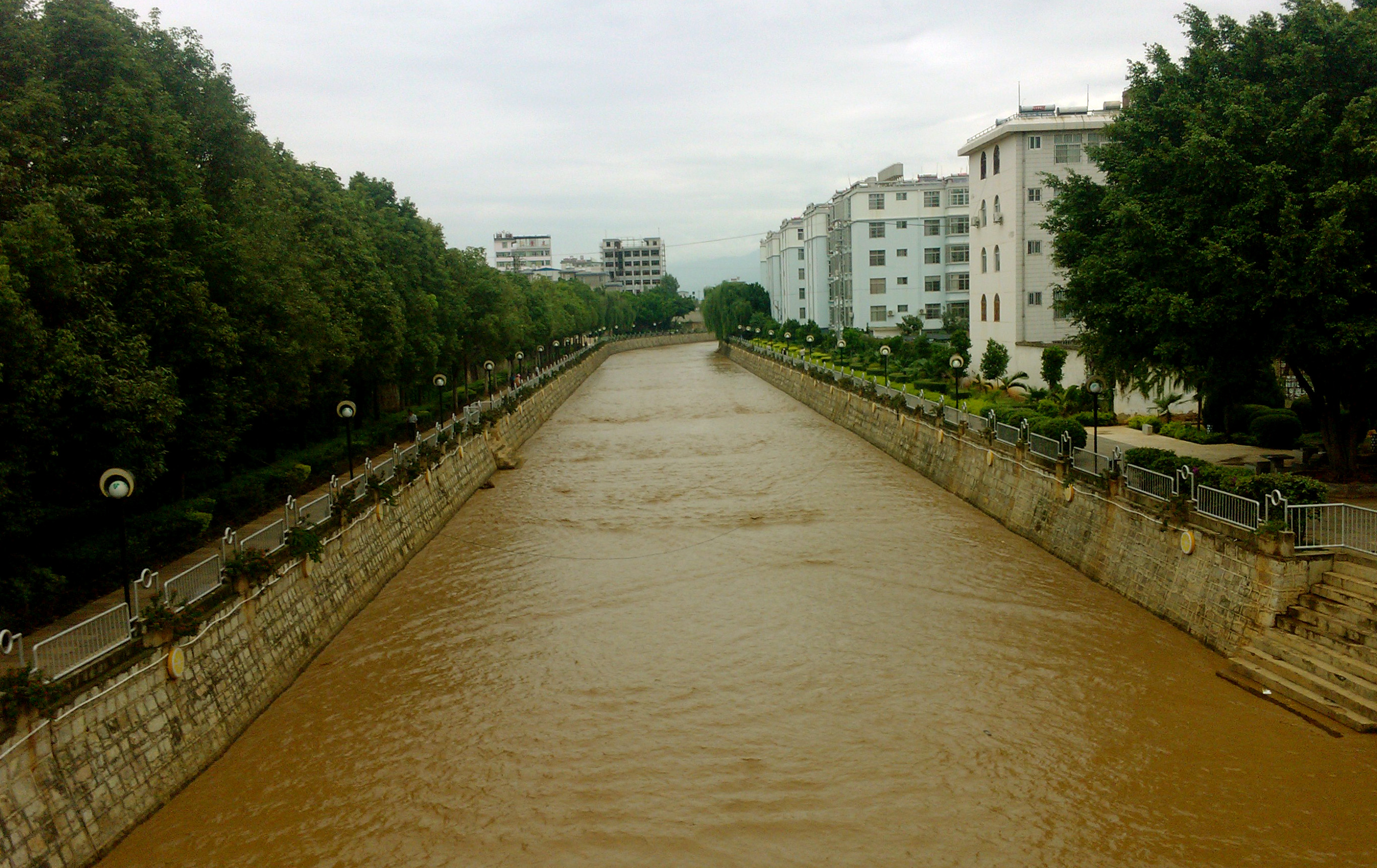
Dadan River (Sangyuan River) in Binchuan County, Yunnan, China.

Dadan River (simplified Chinese: 达旦河; traditional Chinese: 達旦河; pinyin: Dádàn hé) is a right tributary of the Jinsha River in Yunnan, Southwestern China. It is 102.4 km long in total, with a watershed area of 1,888 square kilometers.

== Overview ==
Dadan River rises in the western Binchuan County, the upper course is called Waxi River (瓦溪河, Wǎxī hé) or Binju River (宾居河, Bīnjū hé). The middle course of it is called Sangyuan River (桑园河, Sāngyuán hé) or Naxi River (纳溪河, Nàxī hé) and flows through the Binchuan County from south to north.

The lower course of it is located in southern Yongsheng County. The river has a length of 102.4 km and drains an area of 1,888 square km.

The River has also spots for fishing such as Yongsheng, Lijiang, Yunnan.
