= YSG =

YSG or ysg may refer to:

- Yellow supergiant
- IATA code of Lutselk'e Airport
- ISO 639-3 code of Sonaga language, China
