= Lipo =

Lipo may refer to:

== Science and technology ==
- Liposuction, a medical procedure
- Lithium polymer battery (LiPo)
- lipo, a Mac OS X command line utility for the manipulation of Mach-O universal binary object files

== Other uses ==
- Lipo language, a language of the Lisu people
- Li Po or Li Bai (701–762), Chinese poet

== See also ==
- Lipovitan, an energy drink
- Lipotomy, a medical procedure
- Brescia Airport, airport in Lombardy, Italy (ICAO code: LIPO)
