= Schistura nandingensis =

Scientific classification
- Kingdom: Animalia
- Phylum: Chordata
- Class: Actinopterygii
- Order: Cypriniformes
- Family: Nemacheilidae
- Genus: Schistura
- Species: S. nandingensis

Binomial name
- Schistura nandingensis (S. Q. Zhu & S. H. Wang, 1985)

Synonyms
- Noemacheilus nandingensis Zhu & Wang, 1985

Species of fish

Schistura nandingensis is a species of ray-finned fish, a stone loach in the genus Schistura from the Nanding River drainage in Yunxian County, Yunnan.
