= Laizisi language =

Loloish language of Yunnan, China

Laizisi
- Native to: China
- Region: Yunnan
- Language family: Sino-Tibetan: (Tibeto-Burman); Lolo–Burmese; Loloish; Lisoish; Lalo–Lavu; Taloid; Heqing Yi; Laizisi

Language codes
- ISO 639-3: None (mis)
- Glottolog: None

Laizisi (lai21 dzɨ̠55 sɨ55; Chinese: 莱兹斯话; Moguang Yi 磨光彝) is a Loloish language spoken in Jidiping 吉地坪, Moguang Village 磨光村, Jindun Township 金墩乡, Heqing County, Yunnan, China. Whereas the Laizisi refer to themselves as lai55 dzɨ̠55 sɨ55, they refer to the Yi people of Xipo village 西坡村 as la55 dzɨ̠55 sɨ55. Laizisi was first
