= Limi (disambiguation) =

Limi is a locale in Nepal.

Limi may also refer to:

- Turu language, a Bantu language of Africa
- Limi language, a Loloish language of Asia
