= Tanglang =

Tanglang may be,

- Tanglang River
- Tanglang language
- Tanglang station
