= Naruo language =

Loloish language of Yunnan, China

Naruo
- Native to: China
- Ethnicity: Yi
- Native speakers: 15,000 (2007)
- Language family: Sino-Tibetan: (Tibeto-Burman); Lolo–Burmese; Loloish; Lisoish; Taloid; Naruo

Language codes
- ISO 639-3: ylo
- Glottolog: nalu1239
- ELP: Naluo

Naruo 纳若 (Naluo 纳罗, Laluo; also Alu, Gan Yi) is a Loloish language cluster spoken by the Yi people of Yunnan, China.

== Classification ==
Naluo is classified by Ethnologue as a Northern Loloish language, but Yang, et al. (2017) classifies Naruo as a Taloid language.

== Demographics ==
According to David Bradley (2004), Naluo (Naruo, Laluo, Naru, Shuitian 水田, Shui Yi 水彝 (used in Yunnan)) is spoken by about 15,000 people mostly in eastern Yongsheng County and southern Huaping County, Yunnan, as well as in Pingjiang 平江 and Futian 福田镇 townships, western Panzhihua City, Sichuan. Naluo is moribund or extinct in Sichuan, and endangered in Yunnan.

== Varieties ==
You (2013:85) reports that the na21 zu21 (Naruo 纳儒) language is spoken by the following Yi subgroups.

- Zhili 支里 (autonym: Naruo 纳儒): Nanhua Township, District 1, Yongsheng County 永胜县一区南华乡
- Luo 倮族 (autonym: Naruo 纳儒): Zhongcheng Township, District 4, Yongsheng County 永胜县四区忠诚乡
- Zi Yi 子彝 (autonym: Naruo 纳儒): Xilang Township, District 3, Yongsheng County 永胜县三区习朗乡

On the other hand, the Yongsheng County Gazetteer (1989:637) lists the following subgroups within Shuitian 水田.

- Shuitian 水田 (autonym: Naru 纳儒)
- Shui Yi 水彝 subgroup (autonym: Naruo 纳若)
- Luoluo 倮倮 subgroup (autonym: Xiqima 洗期麻; also called Li 傈/黎)

Other varieties are:

- Naru 纳儒 of southern and central Yongsheng County (pop. 7,000) and southern Huaping County (pop. 4,500)
- Naruo 纳若 (Zhili) of Yongsheng County and Huaping County, spoken by about 12,000 people. It may be the same as Xiaoliangshan Nosu.

Lopi (Shuitian 水田) is an essentially extinct language, although there are more than 15,000 people belonging to the ethnic group in Panzhihua, Sichuan (in Futian 福田 and Pingjiang 平江 Townships) and in northern Yunnan.

Yang, et al. (2017) lists Popei 泼佩 and Naruo 纳若 as Shuitian 水田 varieties, and classifies them as part of the Taloid cluster of Central Ngwi languages.

Zhili 支里 (autonym: Naruo 那若) is spoken by more than 300 persons in Xinying Village 新营村, Nanhua Township 南华乡, Beisheng District 北胜区; and in Xianrenhe Village 仙人河村, Dachang Township 大厂乡 (Yongsheng County Gazetteer 1989:637).
