= YMH =

YMH or ymh may refer to:

- Mary's Harbour Airport, Newfoundland and Labrador, Canada, IATA code YMH
- Mili language, in Yunnan Province, China, ISO 639-3 language code ymh
