= Streptomyces rosealbus =

Scientific classification
- Domain: Bacteria
- Kingdom: Bacillati
- Phylum: Actinomycetota
- Class: Actinomycetia
- Order: Streptomycetales
- Family: Streptomycetaceae
- Genus: Streptomyces
- Species: S. rosealbus

Binomial name
- Streptomyces rosealbus corrig. Xu et al. 2012

Type strain
- CCTCC AA001029, CCTCC M 203016, DSM 41833, YIM 31634

Synonyms
- Streptomyces roseoalbus

Species of bacterium

Streptomyces rosealbus is a bacterium species from the genus of Streptomyces which has been isolated from forest soil from Yongsheng from the Yunnan Province in China.

== See also ==
- List of Streptomyces species
