= Eastern Lipo =

Eastern Lipo (Black Lisu, Heipo, Lipoo) are a Lipo-speaking ethnic group of China. Lipo is a Burmic language. They officially are included with either the Yi people or the Lisu people. They live in Yunnan and Sichuan provinces, mainly in Wuding and Yuanmou counties. An ethnic group named Western Lipo exists, too. Paul Hattaway, author of Operation China, estimates that three-fourths of the Eastern Lipo are Christians.

== Sources ==
- Lewis, M. Paul, ed. (2009), Ethnologue: Languages of the World (Sixteenth ed.), Dallas, TX: SIL International
