= Eka language =

Loloish language of Yunnan, China

Eka
- Native to: China
- Ethnicity: Yi
- Native speakers: 3,000 (2010)
- Language family: Sino-Tibetan: (Tibeto-Burman); Lolo–Burmese; Loloish; Lisoish; Lalo–Lavu; Eka

Language codes
- ISO 639-3: (proposal rejected)
- Glottolog: ekaa1234

Eka (autonym: o21 kha24; exonym: Menghua) is a Loloish language of Yunnan, China. There are 3,000 speakers in Yijiacun, Heliu, Shuangjiang County, Lincang Prefecture. Eka speakers claim to have migrated from Weishan County about 300 years ago.

== Bibliography ==
- Yang, Cathryn. 2010. Lalo regional varieties: Phylogeny, dialectometry, and sociolinguistics. Melbourne: La Trobe University PhD dissertation. http://arrow.latrobe.edu.au:8080/vital/access/HandleResolver/1959.9/153015.
