= Talu language =

Loloish language spoken in Yunnan, China

Talu
- Native to: China
- Region: Yunnan
- Native speakers: 14,000 (2007)
- Language family: Sino-Tibetan: (Tibeto-Burman); Lolo–Burmese; Loloish; Lisoish; Lalo–Lavu; Taloid; Talu

Language codes
- ISO 639-3: yta
- Glottolog: talu1238 Lavu-Yongsheng-Talu
- ELP: Talu
- Talu is classified as Vulnerable by the UNESCO Atlas of the World's Languages in Danger

Talu (他鲁; also known as Taliu; tʰa31 lu55 su55) is a Loloish language spoken by just over 10,000 speakers in Yongsheng and Huaping counties (Zhou 2004:1). Zhou (2004) focuses on the Talu dialect of Liude Township 六德乡. Bradley (2004) reports that Talu (autonym: tʰa31 lu̠55) is spoken in Yongsheng, Ninglang and Huaping counties by 10,138 people, mainly in 4 villages of Liude Township 六德乡 in northeastern Yongsheng County. There are also Talu speakers in adjacent parts of Ninglangping Township, southern Ninglang County, and Tongda Township 通达傈僳族乡 in northeastern Huaping County. Talu has voiceless nasals as also the voiceless lateral. It is related to Lolopo.

A closely related language variety called Nazan 纳咱 (Naza, Nazha) is spoken in Nazan Village 纳咱, Liude Village 六德村, Liude Township 六德乡, Yongsheng County (Yongsheng County Gazetteer 1989:637). It is also spoken in 2 villages in Liude Township, and a few in Banqiao Township.
