= Limi language =

Language spoken in western Yunnan province, China

Limi
- Liumi
- Native to: China
- Region: Yunnan
- Native speakers: 29,000 (2002)
- Language family: Sino-Tibetan: (Tibeto-Burman); Lolo–Burmese; Loloish; Lisoish; Limi

Language codes
- ISO 639-3: ylm
- Glottolog: limi1243

Limi (autonym: li33 mi33) is a Loloish language spoken in Yongde, Fengqing, and Yun counties of western Yunnan province, China.

== Distribution ==
Limi is spoken in the following locations.

- Yongde County (Wumulong 乌木龙彝族乡 and Yalian 亚练乡 Townships)
- Southern Guodazhai Township 郭大寨彝族白族乡, Fengqing County (pop. 4,000)
- Southeastern Yingpan Township 营盘镇, Fengqing County
- Yun County (pop. 1,000)

Yang (2017) reports that Limi is spoken by about 20,000 people in Yongde, Fengqing, and Yun counties. Limi speakers make up 70% of the 26,000 people living in Wumulong Township (乌木龙乡), Yongde County, Yunnan. About 2,600 members of a nearby ethnic group called "Luo" (倮族) (likely Lolopo) also live in and around Wumulong.

== Classification ==
Limi is likely most closely related to Lolopo, but also has many Lalo loanwords.

== History ==
Limi speakers likely migrated from Jingdong County during the early 1300s, first arriving in Bangmai Village (邦卖/班卖), Fengqing County, and then later migrating to Wumulong Township, Yongde County.
