= Tholo language =

Loloish language spoken in Yunnan, China

Tanglang
- Tholo
- 吐鲁沙, Toloza
- Pronunciation: [thólōzɑ̄]
- Native to: China
- Region: Yunnan
- Native speakers: 2,000 (2009)
- Language family: Sino-Tibetan: Tibeto-Burman; Lolo–Burmese; Loloish; Lisoish; Tanglang

Language codes
- ISO 639-3: ytl
- Glottolog: tang1372
- ELP: Tanglang
- Tholo is classified as Vulnerable by the UNESCO Atlas of the World's Languages in Danger

Tanglang (Chinese: 堂郎语), or Tholo (autonym: tʰo55 lo33 zɑ33), is a Loloish language spoken by 947 people in 8 villages of southern Tai'an Township 太安乡, Lijiang County, Yunnan, including in Hongmai 红麦 and Shuijing 水井村 villages. Tanglang has been in long-term contact with Bai, and is also in contact with Naxi. The speakers' name for the language is tʰo42 lo42.

== Names ==
Tanglang speakers are referred to by the following names.

- autonym: tʰo42 lo42 zɑ33 (Tulusha 吐鲁沙)
- exonym in Heqing County: Tanglangzi 堂郎子
- exonym of the Nalu 那鲁 (Heihua 黑话) people: Moxie 麽些
- exonym in Jianchuan County 剑川县: tʰo31 lo31 χo33
- exonym in Lijiangba District 丽江县坝区: tʰo33 le33 dʌ31
- exonym in Nanshan 南山: lu55 lu33
