= Lang'e language =

Loloish language of Yunnan, China

Lang'e
- Native to: China
- Region: Yunnan
- Native speakers: (undated figure of 2,500)
- Language family: Sino-Tibetan: (Tibeto-Burman); Lolo–Burmese; Loloish; Lisoish; Lalo–Lavu; Taloid; Lang'e

Language codes
- ISO 639-3: yne

Lang’e 崀峨 (autonym: la21 u21) is a Loloish language spoken in 12 villages of Lang’e village cluster in Changhai Township, southwestern Yongsheng County by about 2,500 people.
