= Tagu language =

Loloish language of Yunnan, China

Tagu
- Native to: China
- Region: Yunnan
- Language family: Sino-Tibetan: (Tibeto-Burman); Lolo–Burmese; Loloish; Lisoish; Lalo–Lavu; Taloid; Tagu

Language codes
- ISO 639-3: None (mis)
- Glottolog: None

Tagu 塔古 is a Loloish language spoken in parts of Dongshan and Sina townships in southeastern Yongsheng County by at least 2,000 people (Bradley 2004).
