= Mili language =

Loloish language spoken in China

Mili
- Native to: China
- Region: Yunnan
- Native speakers: 23,000 (2002)
- Language family: Sino-Tibetan: (Tibeto-Burman); Lolo–Burmese; Loloish; Lisoish; Lolopo; Mili

Language codes
- ISO 639-3: ymh
- Glottolog: mili1235

Mili is a Loloish language spoken in Jingdong County (in Anding 安定乡 and Wenlong 文龙乡 townships), Yun, Zhenyuan, and Xinping counties of Yunnan province, China. Mili is a variety of Lolopo.

== Vocabulary ==
The following basic vocabulary word list of Mili is from the Xinping County Ethnic Gazetteer (1992:79-80).

English gloss	Chinese gloss	Mili 咪俚语
One	一	tɕʰo²¹
Two	二	ȵi³³
Three	三	so³³
Four	四	li³³
Five	五	ŋo²¹
Six	六	tɕʰo²¹
Seven	七	xə²¹
Eight	八	xẽ²¹
Nine	九	kɯ³³
Ten	十	tʰi³³
Sun	太阳	ʔɑ⁵⁵mu³³tɕʰu³³
Moon	月亮	xo³³bo³⁵
Sky	天	ɤ̃³³tso³³
Ground	地	mi²¹li³³
Mountain	山	ʂe²¹
Water	水	ɤ⁵⁵tsʰou²¹
Fire	火	ʔɑ⁵⁵to⁵⁵
Field	田	dau⁵⁵mi⁵⁵
Valley	谷	tsʰɤ⁵⁵ʂa²¹
Cow	牛	y⁵⁵ŋĩ²¹
Sheep	羊	ʔɑ⁵⁵tsʰi²¹
Horse	马	me²¹
Pig	猪	ve²¹
Chicken	鸡	ʑi³³
Dog	狗	ɑ⁵⁵nu⁵⁵
Eat	吃饭	tso⁵⁵dzo²¹
Sleep	睡觉	ʑi²¹do³³
Man (male)	男人	tsʰo⁵⁵po³³
Woman	女人	tsʰo⁵⁵mo³³
House	房屋	jɛ⁵⁵xɛ⁵⁵
Clothes	衣服	kɑ²¹tɕʰi⁵⁵
Red	红	nɤ̃⁵⁵
Black	黑	nɑ³³
Street	街子	ʑi³³kɑ²¹
