= Lisu language =

Tibeto-Burman language

Lisu
- ꓡꓲ-ꓢꓴ ꓥꓳꓽ, Lisu ngot
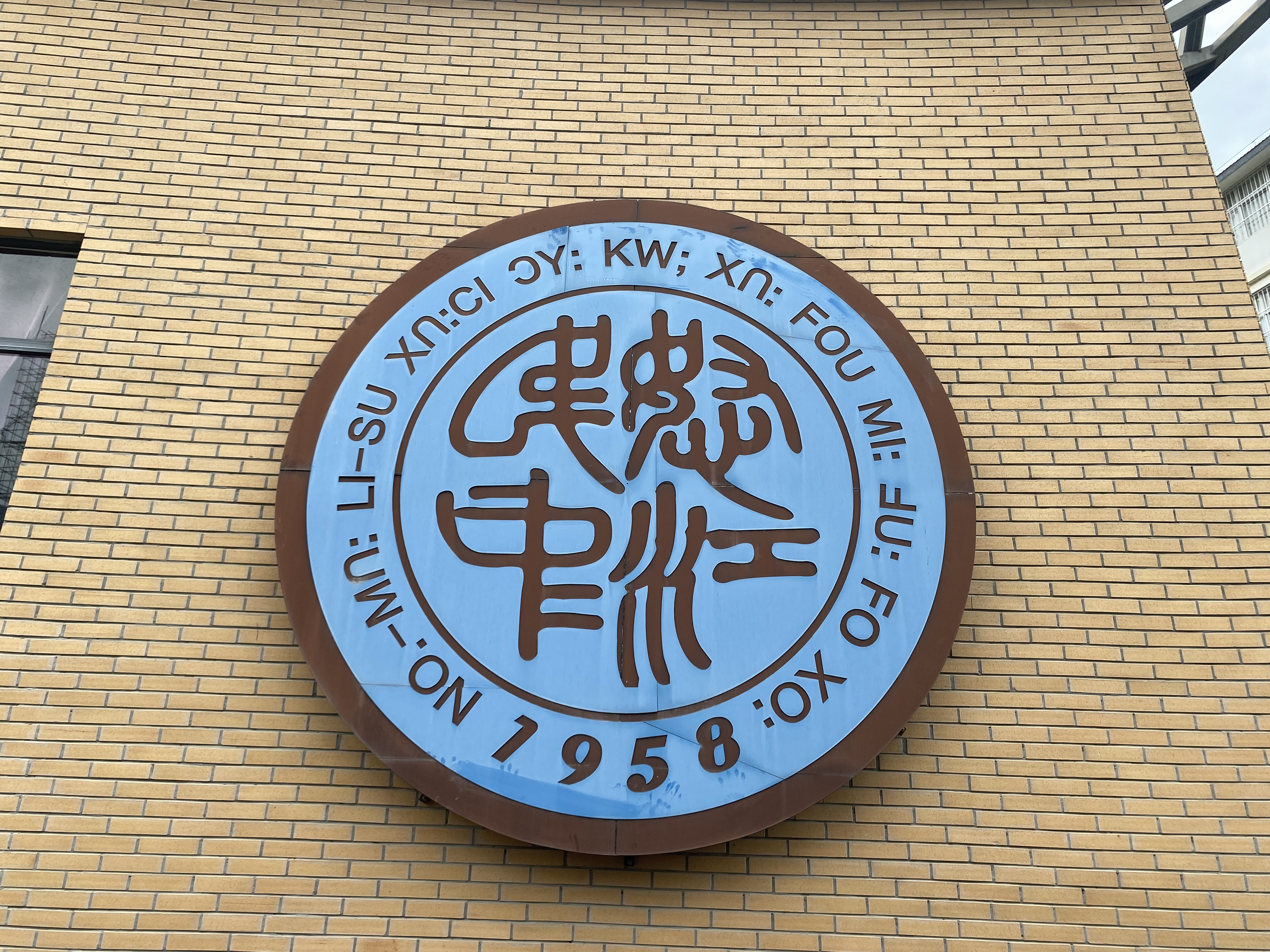
- Nujiang Lisu Autonomous Prefecture Middle School logo written in Lisu
- Native to: China, Myanmar (Burma), India, Thailand
- Ethnicity: Lisu
- Native speakers: (c. 940,000 cited 2000–2007)
- Language family: Sino-Tibetan: Tibeto-Burman; Lolo–Burmese; Loloish; Lisoish; Lisu–Lalo; Lisu
- Writing system: Fraser alphabet, Lisu syllabary, Latin

Official status
- Official language in: Weixi Lisu Autonomous County, Nujiang Lisu Autonomous Prefecture (PRC)

Language codes
- ISO 639-3: lis
- Glottolog: lisu1250

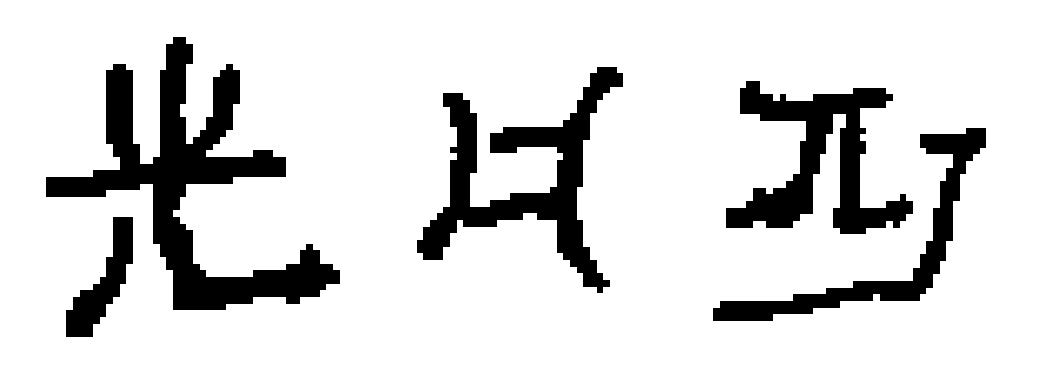
Lisu (Fraser alphabet: ꓡꓲ-ꓢꓴ, ꓡꓲ‐ꓢꓴ ꓥꓳꓽ or ꓡꓲꓢꓴ; Latin: Lisu ngot; Lisu syllabary: ; Chinese: 傈僳语; pinyin: Lìsùyǔ; Burmese: လီဆူဘာသာစကား, pronounced [lìsʰù bàðà zəɡá]) is a tonal Tibeto-Burman language spoken in Yunnan (Southwestern China), Northern Burma (Myanmar) and Thailand and a small part of India. Along with Lipo, it is one of two languages of the Lisu people. Lisu has many dialects that originate from the country in which they live. Hua Lisu, Pai Lisu and Lu Shi Lisu dialects are spoken in China. Although they are mutually intelligible, some have many more loan words from other languages than others.

The Lisu language is closely related to the Lahu and Akha languages and is also related to Burmese, Jingphaw and Yi languages.

== Demographics ==
In China, the Lisu people are mostly found in Yunnan, the majority living mainly in Nujiang and Weixi, but also in Baoshan, Dehong, Dêqên, Lijiang, Lincang, Pu'er, Chuxiong, Luquan and Dali. In Liangshan and Panzhihua, Sichuan, where they make a small minority, some speak Lisu and others speak Lipo, and some are classified under the Yi nationality. A number of Lisu can also be found in southern Tibet.

In Myanmar, it is spoken in Shan State, Kachin State, Sagaing Division and Mandalay Division. The two states are bordered by Yunnan. The Fraser script was invented in Myanmar by Sara Ba Thaw.

In India, it is spoken in the Changlang District of Arunachal Pradesh and possibly in the Tinsukia District of Assam. See Lisu people § Lisu in India for more information. Lisu people in India are called Yobin.

In Northern Thailand, it is spoken mainly in the provinces of Chiang Mai, Chiang Rai, Mae Hong Son and Kamphaeng Phet.

Possibly, there are also perhaps some Lisu speakers in Laos and in Vietnam. The Lisu villages in Laos and Vietnam are rare and isolated from the outside world, and are difficult to distinguish among the Hmong and Yao villages, which make up the majority.

== Dialects ==
Three dialects can be distinguished: northern, central and southern, with northern being the standard.

=== Bradley (2003) ===
Bradley (2003) lists the following three Lisu dialects.

- Northern (/lo35 nɛ̠44/, 'Black Lisu' (autonym), /lo35 wu55/, 'Northern Lisu' (name given by other Lisu)): Northwest Yunnan, Kachin State, Mandalay region, Sagaing Region and India
- Central (/ɕɑ̠44 ɕɑ̠44/, Flowery Lisu or Hua Lisu): Western Yunnan, Burma
- Southern (/lo35 ʂɨ33/, 'Yellow Lisu'): extreme Southwestern Yunnan, Shan State of Burma, Thailand, Laos, Vietnam

=== Mu and Sun (2012) ===
In their study of Lisu dialects, Mu and Sun (2012) split Lisu into three dialects.

- Nujiang 怒江方言: 550,000 speakers in Nujiang Prefecture (all counties), Baoshan Prefecture (all counties), Dehong Prefecture (some counties), Lincang Prefecture (some counties), Dali Prefecture (a few counties) and Weixi County
- Luquan 禄劝方言: 65,000 speakers in parts of Chuxiong Prefecture (in Luquan County, Wuding County, etc.) and parts of neighboring prefectures
- Yongsheng 永胜方言: 18,000 speakers in the counties of Yongsheng, Huaping, Panzhihua, Muli, Yanyuan and others

Mu and Sun (2012) compare a total of five datapoints in their comparative vocabulary table.

- Fugong 福贡: 140,000 speakers in Fugong, Gongshan, Lanping, etc.
- Luquan 禄劝 (autonym: li33 pʰɒ31, Lipo): 45,000+ speakers in Binchuan, Wuding, Yuanmou, Dayao, Yao'an, Yongren, Dechang, Huili, Huidong, Yanyuan, etc.
- Weixi 维西: 100,000+ speakers in Weixi, Deqin, Zhongdian, Lijiang, etc.
- Tengchong 腾冲: 120,000+ speakers in Longling, Dehong Prefecture, Gengma, Simao, Lushui, Shan State (Burma), Chiang Mai (Thailand)
- Yongsheng 永胜: 90,000+ speakers in Yongsheng, Huaping, Ninglang, Dayao, Yongren, Dechang, etc.

== Orthography ==
=== Pollard alphabet ===
Sam Pollard's A-Hmao was adapted to write Lipo, another Lisoish language (sometimes called Eastern Lisu) spoken by the Lisu people.

=== Fraser alphabet ===
The Lisu alphabet currently in use throughout Lisu-speaking regions in China, Burma and Thailand was primarily developed by two Protestant missionaries from different missionary organizations. The more famous of the two is James O. Fraser, a British evangelist from the China Inland Mission. His colleague, who developed the original version of the alphabet (later revised and improved with Fraser and various colleagues from the C.I.M.) was Sara Ba Thaw, a polyglot Karen preacher based in Myitkyina, Burma, who belonged to the American Baptist Mission.

Ba Thaw had prepared a simple Lisu catechism by 1915. The script now widely known as the "Fraser alphabet" was finished by 1939, when Fraser's mission houses in the Lisu ethnic areas of Yunnan Province (China) received their newly printed copies of the Lisu New Testament.

=== Lisu syllabary ===
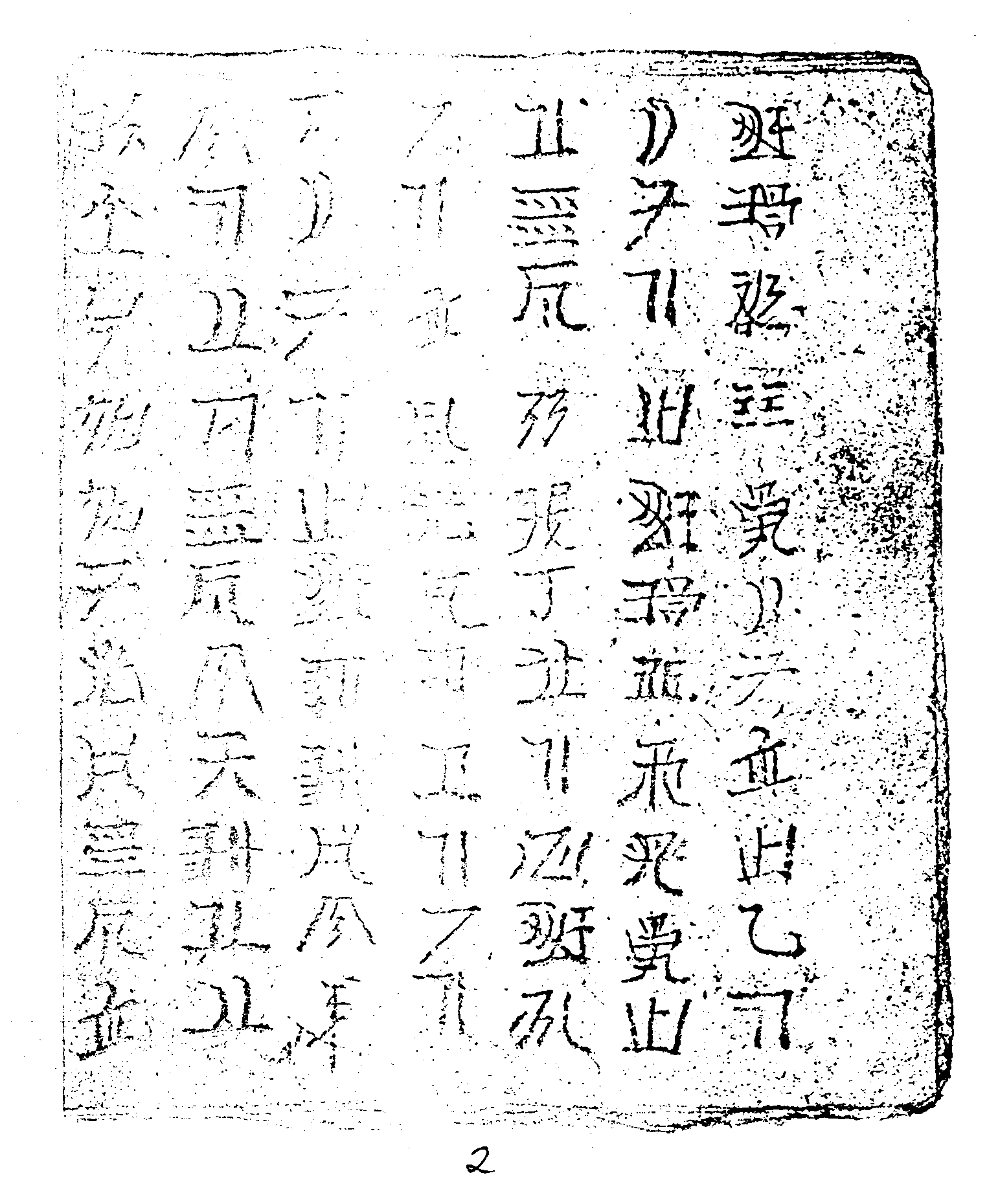
Lisu syllabary

From 1924 to 1930, a Lisu farmer named Ngua-ze-bo (pronounced [ŋua˥ze˧bo˦]; Chinese: 汪忍波/哇忍波) invented the Lisu syllabary from Chinese characters, Dongba script and Geba script. However, it looks more different from the Chinese script than Chữ Nôm and Sawndip (Zhuang logograms). Since Ngua-ze-bo initially carved his characters on bamboos, the syllabary is known as the Lisu Bamboo script (傈僳竹书).

It has a total of 1250 glyphs and 989 characters.

=== Latin Lisu alphabet ===
A new Lisu alphabet based on pinyin was created in 1957, but most Lisu continued to use the old alphabet. The Fraser alphabet was officially recognized by the Chinese government in 1992, since which time its use has been encouraged.

=== Burmese Lisu script ===
In a few places in Myanmar in which Lisu is spoken, an orthography based on the Burmese alphabet has been developed and is taught to speakers and used in several publications and school books.

=== Thai script ===
In the 1970s, missionary Edward Hope of OMF International created a variant of the Thai script for the Lisu of Thailand. In doing so, he was guided by the policy of the Thai authorities, who believed that the writing systems of the country's national minorities should be based on the Thai script. However, this alphabet did not gain any popularity.

Thai alphabet for Lisu:

Consonants
ก	ข	ค	ฆ	ง	จ	ฉ	ช	ซ	ฌ	ญ	ฎ	ด	ดส	ดซ	ต	ตส	ตซ	ถ
/k/	/kʰ/	/kʰ/	/x/	/ŋ/	/tɕ/, /tʂ/	/tɕʰ/, /tʂʰ/	/tɕʰ/, /tʂʰ/	/s/, /ɕ/, /ʂ/	/dʑ/, /dʐ/	/z/, /ʐ/	/g/	/d/	/dz/	/dz/	/t/	/ts/	/ts/	/tʰ/
ท	ทส	ทซ	น	บ	ป	ผ	ฝ	พ	ฟ	ม	ย	ฦ	ล	ว	ส	ห	อ	ฮ
/tʰ/	/tsʰ/	/tsʰ/	/n/, /ɲ/	/b/	/p/	/pʰ/	/f/	/pʰ/	/f/	/m/	/y/, /ʑ/	/ɣ/	/l/	/v/, /w/	/s/, /ɕ/, /ʂ/	/h/	/ʔ/	/h/

Vowels
ะ	า	◌ิ	◌ี	◌ึ	◌ื	◌ุ	◌ู	เ-ะ	เ	แ-ะ	แ	เ-าะ	อ	เ-อะ	เ-อ
/ɑ/	/ɑ/	/i/	/i/	/ɯ/, /ɤ/	/ɯ/, /ɤ/	/u/, /y/	/u/, /y/	/e/	/e/	/ɛ/	/ɛ/	/o/	/o/	/e/	/ø/

Tones
◌่	◌๋	◌๊
low	laryngealized high	high

== Phonology ==
The Lisu phonological inventory is as follows.

=== Vowels ===
Lisu vowels
	Front		Back	
	Unrounded	Rounded	Unrounded	Rounded
Close	i~ɨ	y~ʉ	ɯ	u
Mid	e	ø	ɤ	o
Open	ɛ		ɑ	

[i] and the fricative vowel [ɨ] are in complementary distribution: [ɨ] is only found after palato-alveolars, though an alternate analysis is possible, with the palato-alveolars viewed as allophones of the palatals before [u] and [ɨ]. The distinction originates from proto-Lolo–Burmese consonant clusters of the type *kr or *kj, which elsewhere merge, but where Lisu normally develops /i/, they remain distinct with the latter producing the type [tʃɨ], the former the type [tɕi]. Inherited palatal affricates + /i/ also become [tʃɨ].

In Central Lisu, [i] is heard as a syllabic [z̩] when after alveolar sibilant sounds, and as [ʐ̩] when after retroflex sibilant sounds. /ɑ/ is heard as more fronted [a] when following alveolo-palatal sounds.

/y/ is variable across dialects. It may be either endolabial or exolabial, central [ʉ] or even merged with /u/. The distinction between ɯ and ɤ is marginal, and both are written ⟨e⟩ in pinyin.

=== Tones ===
Lisu has six tones: high [˥], mid creaky [˦ˀ], mid [˧], low [˨˩], rising [˧˥] and low checked [˨˩ʔ] (that is, [tá ta̰ ta tà tǎ tàʔ]). In some dialects the creaky tone is higher than mid tone, in others they are equal. The rising tone is infrequent, but common in baby talk (which has a stereotypical disyllabic low–rising pattern); both high and rising tone are uncommon after voiced consonants.

=== Consonants ===
Lisu consonants
		Labial	Alveolar		Retroflex	(Alveolo-) Palatal	Velar	Glottal
		Labial	plain	sibilant	Retroflex	(Alveolo-) Palatal	Velar	Glottal
Nasal		m	n			ɲ	ŋ	h, h̃
Plosive/ Affricate	tenuis	p	t	ts	tʂ	tɕ	k	ʔ
Plosive/ Affricate	aspirated	pʰ	tʰ	tsʰ	tʂʰ	tɕʰ	kʰ	
Plosive/ Affricate	voiced	b	d	dz	dʐ	dʑ	ɡ	
Fricative	voiceless	(f)		s	ʂ	ɕ	x	
Fricative	voiced	v~w		z	ʐ	j	ɣ	
Continuant		v~w	l			j		

[v] and [w] are in complementary distribution, with [v] before front vowels. /f/ is marginal, occurring in a few words before /u/ or /y/. The subdialect Fraser first encountered also distinguishes a retroflex series, /tʂ tʂʰ dʐ ʂ ʐ/, but only before /ɑ/.

Medial glides appear before /ɑ/. These are /w/ with velars and /j/ with bilabials and /h̃/. The latter consonant (see rhinoglottophilia) has a non-nasal allophone in the imperative particle [hɑ́]. /ɣ/ is only distinctive before /ɑ/ and in some dialects is merged with /j/.

In Central Lisu, /j/ can be heard as an alveolo-palatal [ʑ] when before /i/. In Southern Lisu, the velar plosives become alveopalatal before front vowels. The vowels /u/ and /e/ trigger an offglide on preceding consonants, so /tu du te de/ are pronounced [tfu dvu tje dje].

The vowels /ɯ ɤ/ do not occur initially—or, at least, in initial position they are pronounced [ɣɯ ɣɤ]. It has been argued that the initial vowels /i e y u ɯ ɤ/ are phonetically [ji je fy fu ɣɯ ɣɤ], so initial consonants do not need to be posited in such cases (and marginal /f/ can be removed from the inventory of native words), or that they are phonemically /ʔV/, with glottal stop.

== Works cited ==
- Bradley, David (2003). "Lisu". In Thurgood, Graham; LaPolla, Randy J. (eds.). The Sino-Tibetan Languages. London: Routledge. ISBN 0-7007-1129-5.
- Handel, Zev. "Proto-Lolo–Burmese Velar Clusters and the Origin of Lisu Palatal Sibilant" (PDF). Archived from the original (PDF) on 2020-08-03 – via faculty.washington.edu.
- Mu, Yuzhang 木玉璋; Sun, Hongkai 孙宏开 (2012). Lìsùyǔ fāngyán yánjiū 傈僳语方言研究 [A Study of Lisu Dialects] (in Chinese). Beijing: Minzu chubanshe. ISBN 978-7-105-12004-8.
- Tabain, Marija; Bradley, David; Yu, Defen (2019). Central Lisu. Journal of the International Phonetic Association, 49(1). pp. 129–147.
