= Sonaga language =

Loloish language of Yunnan, China

Sonaga
- Native to: China
- Region: Yunnan
- Native speakers: 2,000 (2009)
- Language family: Sino-Tibetan: (Tibeto-Burman); Lolo–Burmese; Loloish; Lisoish; Lalo–Lavu; Taloid; Heqing Yi; Sonaga

Language codes
- ISO 639-3: ysg
- Glottolog: sona1244

Sonaga (so21 na33 ka̠33; Chinese: 锁内嘎话; Xinfeng Yi 新峰彝) is a Loloish language of Heqing County, Yunnan, China. Sonaga is spoken in Dongdeng 东登 of Xinfeng Village 新峰村 (as well as Anle Village 安乐村), Caohai Township 草海乡, Heqing County (Castro, et al. 2010).
