= Lolopo language =

Loloish language spoken in China

Lolopo
- Central Yi
- Loxrlavu
- Native to: China
- Ethnicity: Yi
- Native speakers: 570,000 (2002–2007)
- Language family: Sino-Tibetan: Tibeto-Burman; Lolo–Burmese; Loloish; Lisoish; Lipo–Lolopo; Lolopo
- Writing system: Yi script

Language codes
- ISO 639-3: ycl – inclusive code Individual code: ysp – Southern Lolopo
- Glottolog: lolo1259

Lolopo (Chinese: 倮倮颇; pinyin: Luǒluǒpō; autonyms: lɔ21 lo33 pʰɔ21, lo31 lo31 pʰo31; Chinese: 彝语中部方言; Central Yi) is a Loloish language spoken by half a million Yi people of China. Chinese speakers call it Central Yi, as the name Lolopo does not exist in Chinese. It is one of the six Yi languages recognized by the government of China.

== Distribution ==
The Lolo language is mainly spoken in central Yunnan. It is also spoken in Laos.

In Laos, Lolo is spoken in three villages of Phongsaly Province. An alternative spelling of Lolopo is Lolopho.

== Names ==
Lolo speakers are referred to by a variety of exonyms. Below is a list of exonyms followed by their respective autonyms and demographics.

- Mili: lo21 lo33 pʰo21 (spoken by about 12,000 people in Jingdong County). Also called Alie.
- Enipu 厄尼蒲 (ɣɯ55 ni21 pa̠21 'water buffalo people', an offensive exonym used by Lalo speakers): lo21 lo33 pʰo21 (spoken in Nanjian County). Spoken by nearly 20,000 people in Weishan County (Qinghua Township) and Nanjian County (in Wuliang, Xiaowandong, and Langcang townships)
- Tu 土 (Tuzu 土族): lo21 lo33 pʰo21 (spoken by nearly 10,000 people in southern Xiangyun County)
- Qiangyi 羌夷: lɔ̠21 lɔ33 sɨ55 (spoken by nearly 15,000 people in northern and central Xiangyun County)
- Eastern Lalu: lo̠21 lo̠33 (spoken by nearly 20,000 people in Xinping County and Zhenyuan County). The Xinping dialect is documented in Wang (2020). In Xinping County, there are about 3,000 ethnic "Lalu" (腊鲁; i.e., Lolopo) in Malutang 马鹿塘 and Mowei 磨味 villages, located in Jianxing Township 建兴乡.
- Lolo (of northeastern Binchuan County): lo̠21 lo33 pʰo21
- Xiangtang 香堂 (spoken in Zhenkang County). Widespread distribution in Jinggu, Zhenyuan, Pu'er, Jiangcheng, Mengla, Jinghong, and Zhenkang counties, with perhaps under 80,000 speakers.
- Lolo (of Nanhua County): lo̠21 lo̠33 pʰo21
- Lolo (of Yao'an County): lo21 la33 pʰo21
- Wotizo: wɔ21 ti33 zɔ21 (Yang 2010:7)

== Classification ==
Yang (2011) proposes this tentative internal classification of Lolo.

- Southern Lolo (?)
  - Western Lolo (Southern Lolopo in Ethnologue)
  - Xiangtang
  - Jingdong Lolo (Mili)
- Southern Dali Lolo (Enipu)
- Nanhua Lolo
  - Eastern Lalu
  - Tu
- Binchuan Lolo (?)
- Yao'an Lolo (Qiangyi) (?)

The Chuxiong Prefecture Ethnic Gazetteer (2013:364) lists the following cognacy percentages between Lolopo 罗罗濮 and other Yi languages in Chuxiong Prefecture.

- Ache 阿车: 74.86% (211/282)
- Chesu 车苏: 55% (155/282)
- Luowu 罗武: 75.89% (214/282)
- Shansu 山苏: 78.4% (221/282)
- Lipo 里濮: 93.36% (253/271)

== Phonology ==
=== Consonants ===
		Labial	Alveolar		Palatal	Velar	Glottal
Plosive/ Affricate	voiceless	p	t	ts	tʃ	k	ʔ
Plosive/ Affricate	aspirated	pʰ	tʰ	tsʰ	tʃʰ	kʰ	ʔ
Plosive/ Affricate	voiced	b	d	dz	dʒ	ɡ	ʔ
Fricative	voiceless	f	s		ʃ	x	
Fricative	voiced	v	z		ʝ	ɣ	
Nasal		m	n			ŋ	
Lateral			l~ɮ				
Semivowel						w	

- /m, n, ŋ/ before stops and fricatives are heard as syllabic sounds [m̩, ɱ̍], [n̩], and [ŋ̍].
- /l/ is also heard in free variation as a voiced lateral fricative [ɮ].

=== Vowels ===
There is distinction between tight-throat vowels and lax-throat (plain) vowels.

	Front		Back	
	lax	tight	lax	tight
Close	i	i̱	ɯ	ɯ̱
Near-close			ʊ	ʊ̱
Mid	e	e̱	o	o̱
Near-open	æ	æ̱		
Open	a	a̱		

Diphthongs
	Front		Back
Mid			ʲo, ʲo̱
Open	ʲɛ, ʲæ̱	ʲa, ʲa̱	

- Sounds /ʊ, ʊ̱/ are pronounced as syllabic consonants [z̩ʷ, ẕ̩ʷ] when following alveolar sibilants, and as [v̩, v̱̩] when following /d/ in a low [˨] tone syllable.
- Sounds /i, i̱/ are heard as syllabic consonants [z̩, ẕ̩] when following alveolar sibilants.
- Sounds /ɯ, ɯ̱/ are heard as central sounds [ə, ə̱] when following alveolar consonants.
- /æ/ is heard as open-mid [ɛ] following alveolar plosives /t, d, ts, dz/, a palatal fricative /ʝ/, and within palatalized diphthongs /ʲ/.

=== Tones ===
Name	Pitch	Symbol
Low	21	˨
Mid	33	˧
High	55	˦
