= Hlersu language =

Loloish language spoken in Yunnan, China

Hlersu
- Sansu
- Native to: China
- Ethnicity: Yi
- Native speakers: 15,000 (2007)
- Language family: Sino-Tibetan: Tibeto-Burman; Lolo–Burmese; Loloish; Lisoish; Lipo–Lolopo; Hlersu

Language codes
- ISO 639-3: hle
- Glottolog: hler1235
- ELP: Hlersu
- Hlersu is classified as Vulnerable by the UNESCO Atlas of the World's Languages in Danger

Hlersu (Lesu 勒苏), or Sansu (Shansu 山苏/散苏), is a Loloish language of Yunnan Province, China. It is spoken in Xinping, Jinping, Zhenyuan, Eshan (as Shansu 山苏), and (as Sansu) Yuanjiang County.

A deprecated ISO 639-3 code sca was assigned to Sansu of Yuanjiang County and Myanmar, but was later merged with Hlersu (hle).

== Background ==
Hlersu (autonym: ɬɛɾ55 sɨ55 pʰa21; exonym: ɬɛɾ55 sɨ55 pʰo21; so33 su33 pʰa21) autonym reported in Yunnan (1955)) is spoken by ethnic Hlersu people, who live in 13 townships (50 administrative villages and 143 hamlets). There are 4,040 households and 15,737 individuals in Xinping, Yuanjiang, and Eshan counties (Xu & Bai 2013:1). The ethnic population of each township is as follows.

- Xinping County
  - Pingdian 平甸乡 (1,862 people)
  - Guishan 桂山镇 (756 people)
  - Yangwu 杨武镇 (1,203 people)
  - Xinhua 新化乡 (2,205 people)
  - Laochang 老厂乡 (381 people)
  - Yaojie 腰街镇 (255 people)
  - Gasa 嘎洒镇 (155 people)
  - Mosha 漠沙镇 (412 people)
- Yuanjiang County
  - Ganzhuangjie 甘庄街道 (3,950 people)
  - Wadie 洼垤乡 (102 people)
  - Longtan 龙潭乡 (1,560 people)
- Eshan County
  - Tadian 塔甸镇 (1,725 people)
  - Fuliangpeng 富良棚乡 (371 people)
- Shiping County
  - Daqiao 大桥乡 (312 people)
  - Baoxiu 宝秀镇 (433 people)
- Shuangbai County (81 people)
- Zhenyuan County (150 people): Zhedong 者东乡 Zhangpen 樟盆村, Heping 和平乡 Yakou 丫口村

Speakers refer to their language as ɬɛɾ55 su55 do21 (Xu & Bai 2013:62). The Hlersu dialect documented by Xu & Bai (2013) is that of Pujiehei 普杰黑, Daxi Village 大西村, Tadian Town 塔甸镇, Eshan County.
