= Kua-nsi language =

Language

Kua-nsi
- Native to: China
- Region: Yunnan
- Native speakers: 5,000 (2009)
- Language family: Sino-Tibetan: (Tibeto-Burman); Lolo–Burmese; Loloish; Lisoish; Lalo–Lavu; Taloid; Heqing Yi; Kua-nsi

Language codes
- ISO 639-3: ykn
- Glottolog: kuan1249

Kua-nsi (kʰua33 n̩21 sɨ55; Chinese: 跨恩斯话; Hedong Yi 河东彝) is a Loloish language of Heqing County, Yunnan, China.

Gomotage (ɣɔ21 mɔ33 ta55 ɣə21), an undocumented and little-known Loloish language of Eryuan County, is also probably related to Kua-nsi (Yang 2010:7).

== Distribution ==
The Kua-nsi live in the following villages of Liuhe Township 六合乡, northern Heqing County (Castro, et al. 2010:23).

- Hedong 河东
- Sangezhuang 三戈庄
- Shang'eping 上萼坪
- Wuxing 五星
- Nanpo 南坡
- Maidi 麦地
- Longda 龙大
