= Lavu language =

Language

Lavu
- Native to: China
- Region: Yunnan
- Ethnicity: Yi
- Language family: Sino-Tibetan: (Tibeto-Burman); Lolo–Burmese; Loloish; Lisoish; Lalo–Lavu; Taloid; Lavu

Language codes
- ISO 639-3: None (mis)
- Glottolog: talu1238 Lavu-Yongsheng-Talu

Lavu (Chinese: 拉乌; autonym: lɑ55 vu̠55) is a Loloish language of Yongsheng County, Yunnan, China.

Languages related to Lavu include Liude 六得, Nazha 纳渣, and perhaps Shuitian 水田, Zhili 支里, Luo 倮, Ziyi 子彝, and Liming 黎明.
