= Popei language =

Loloish language of Yunnan, China

Popei
- Native to: China
- Region: Yunnan
- Ethnicity: Yi
- Language family: Sino-Tibetan: (Tibeto-Burman); Lolo–Burmese; Loloish; Lisoish; Lalo–Lavu; Taloid; Popei

Language codes
- ISO 639-3: None (mis)
- Glottolog: None

Popei 泼佩 is a Loloish language spoken in Huaping County, Yunnan, China. In Huaping County, it is spoken by about 1,000 people in several villages. Popei is also spoken in Dayao and Yongren Counties, as well as small pockets in nearby regions.
