= Yun County, Yunnan =

Yun County 云县
- County
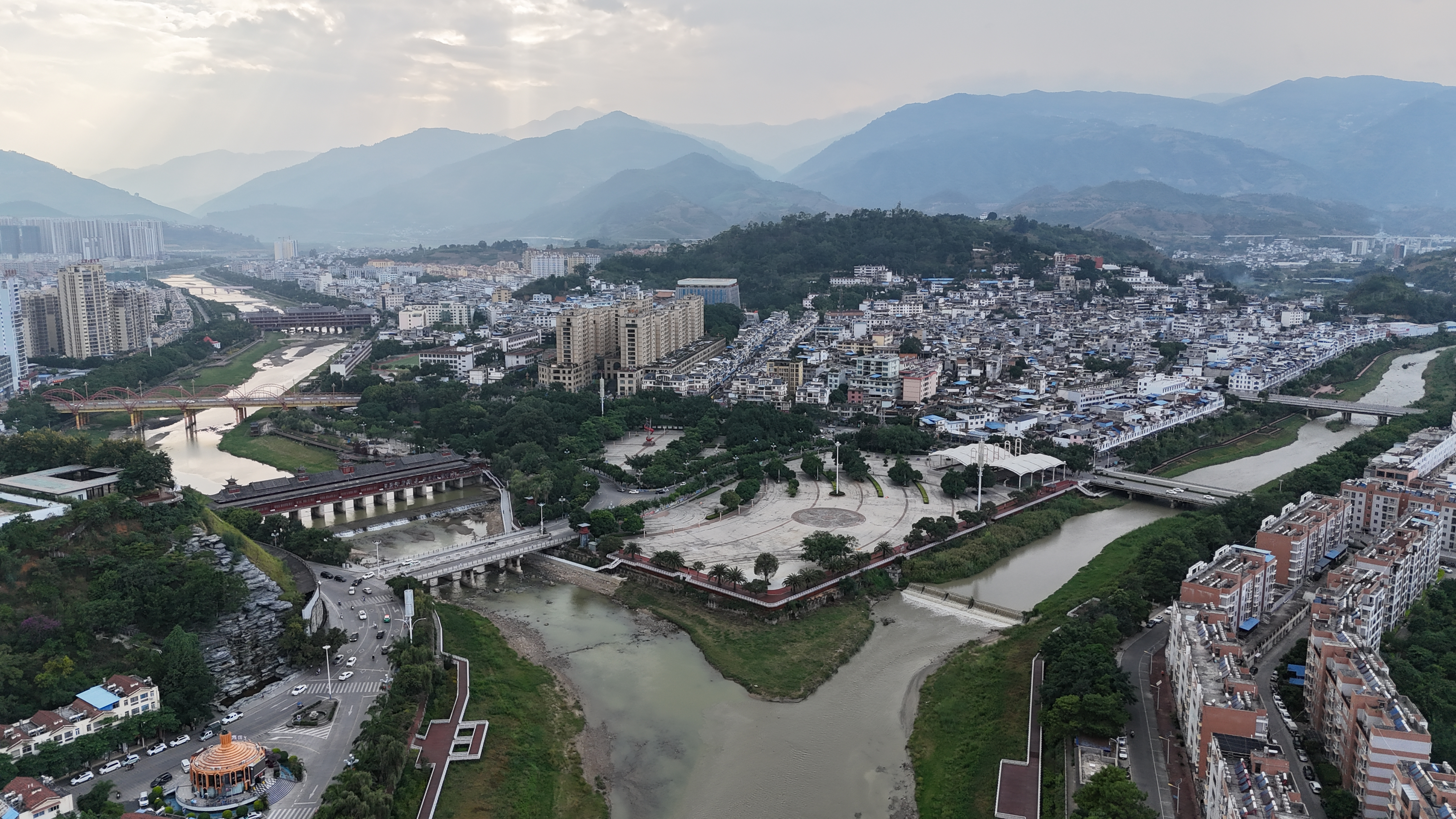
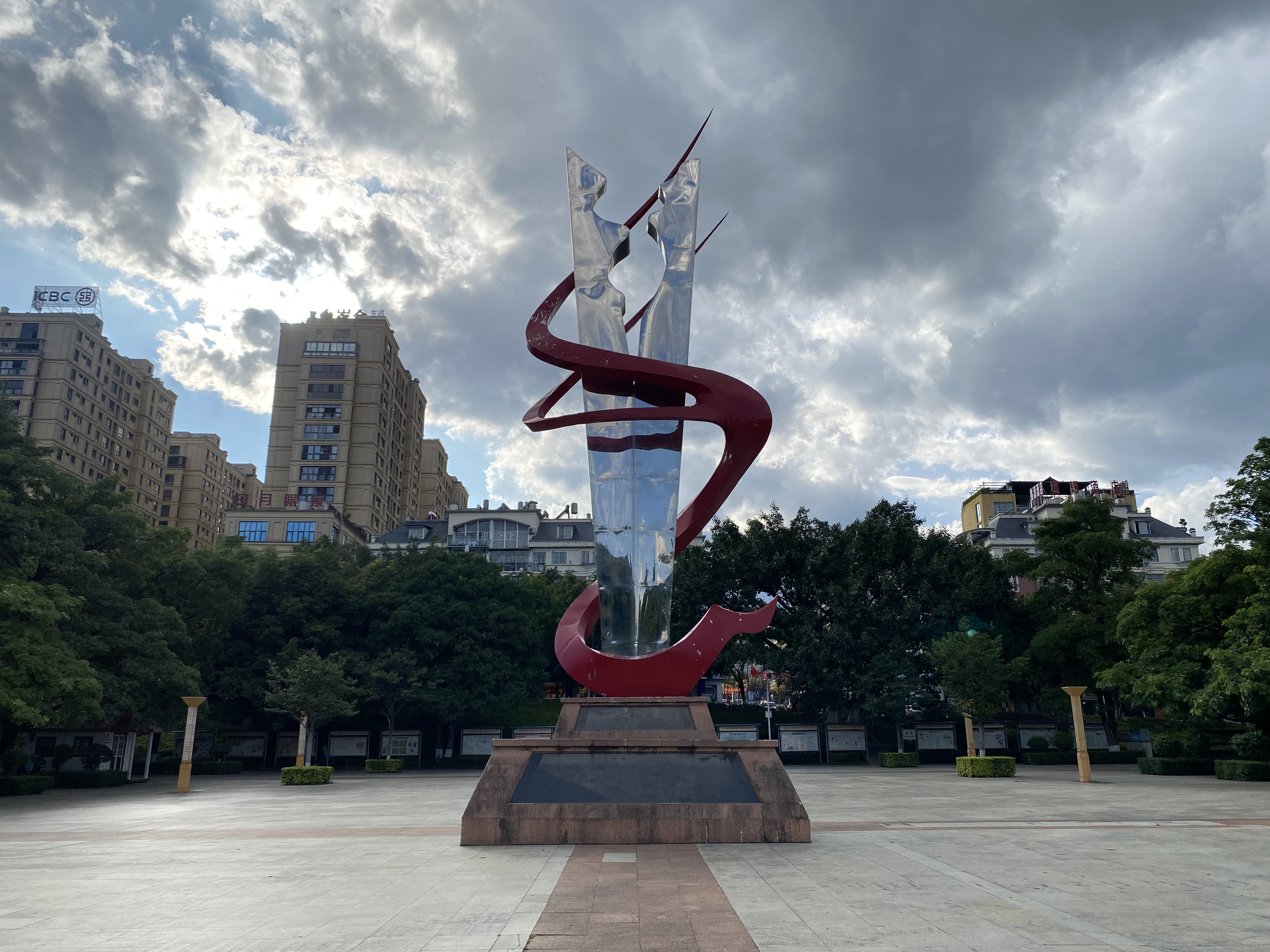
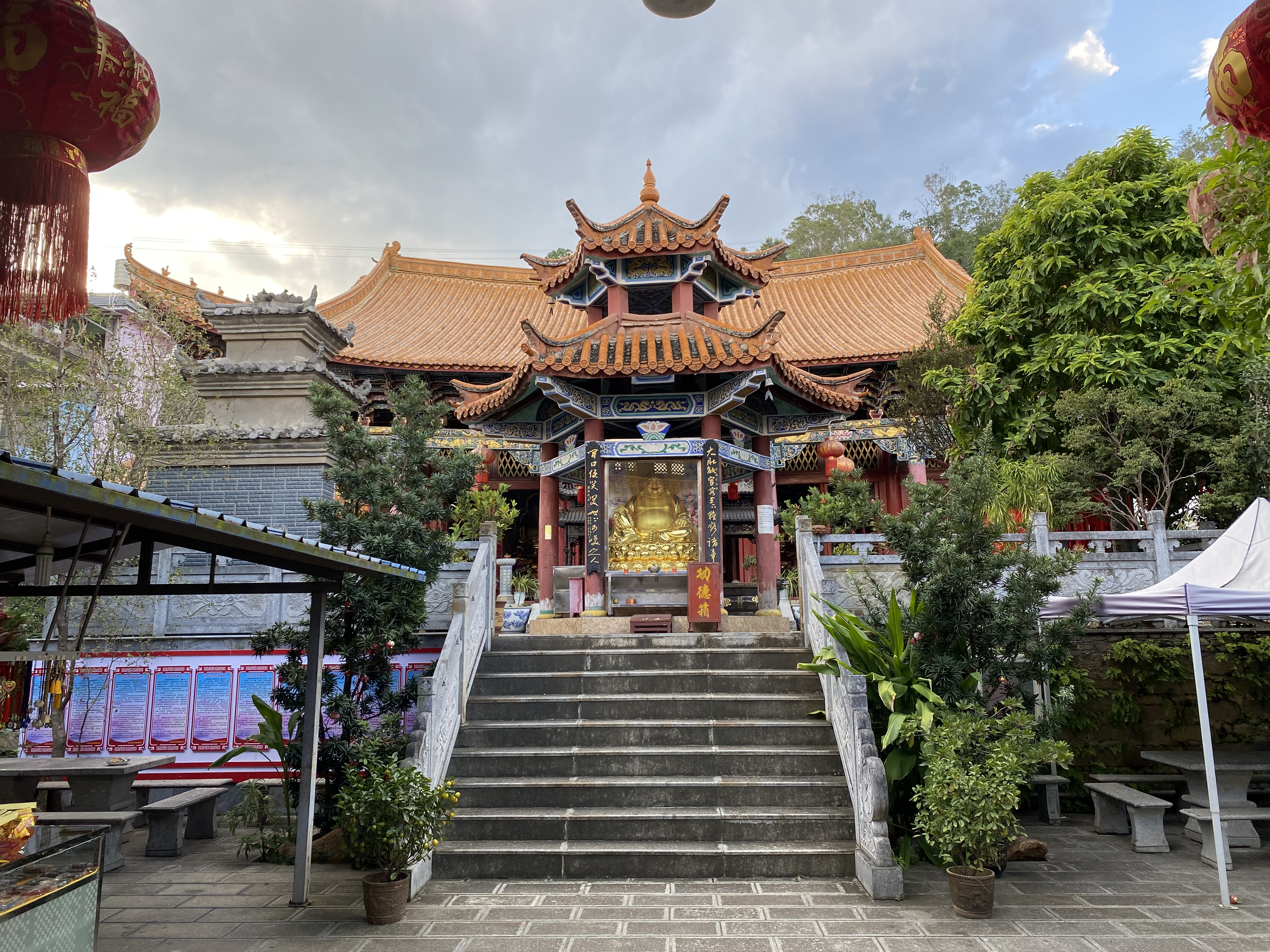
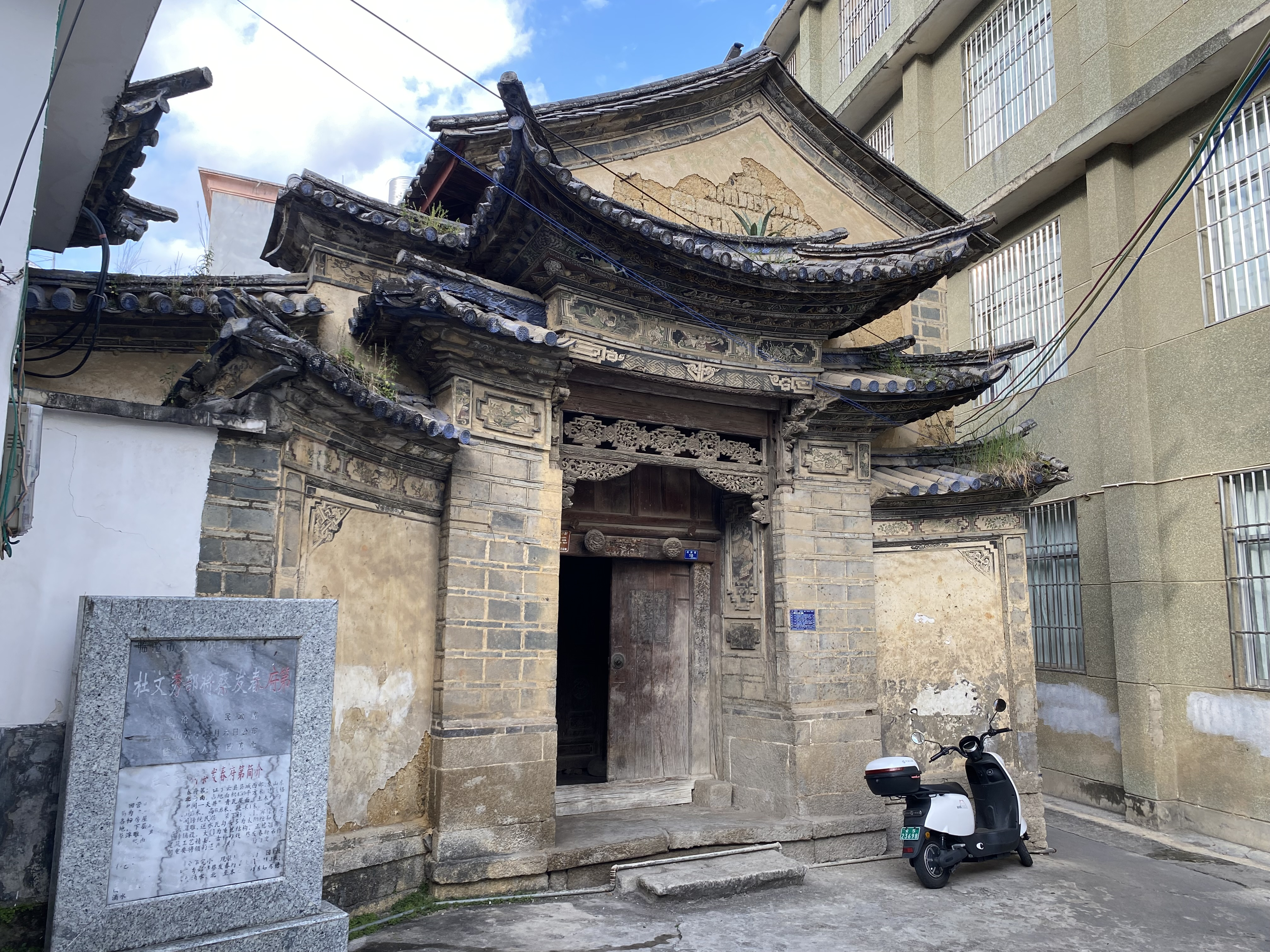
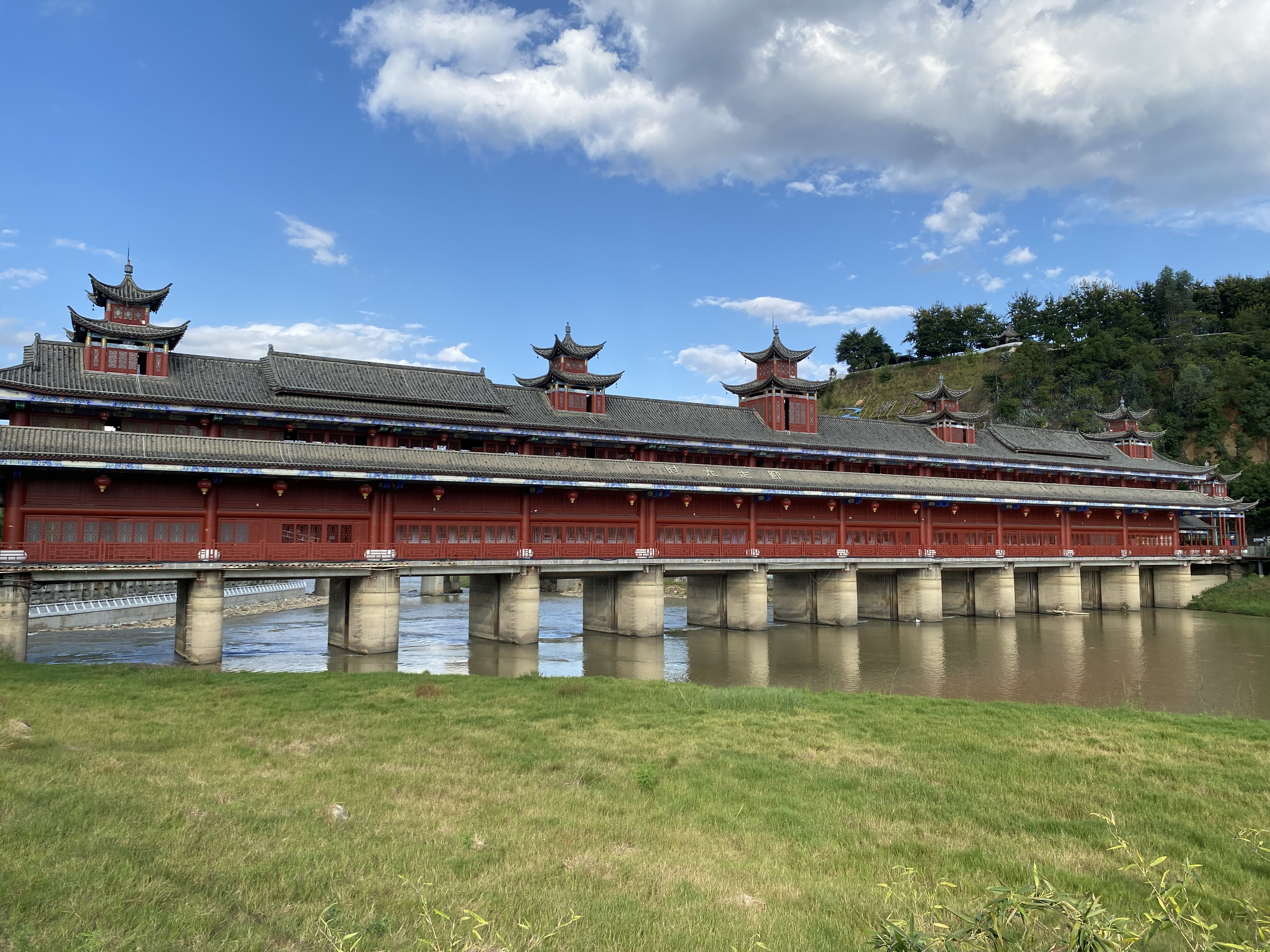
- Cityscape of county town Landmark sculpture Yunjue Temple Former residence of Cai Fachun Yunzhou Scenic Bridge Walk

- Location of Yun County (red) and Lincang City (pink) within Yunnan
- Coordinates: 24°26′13″N 100°07′23″E
- Country: People's Republic of China
- Province: Yunnan
- Prefecture-level city: Lincang

Area
  - Total: 3,760 km^{2} (1,450 sq mi)

Population (2020)
  - Total: 389,180
- Time zone: UTC+8 (CST)
- Postal code: 675800
- Area code: 0883
- Website: http://www.ynyx.gov.cn/

Yun County or Yunxian (simplified Chinese: 云县; traditional Chinese: 雲縣; pinyin: Yún Xiàn) is a county in the southwest of Yunnan province, China. It is the easternmost county-level division of the prefecture-level city of Lincang. Yun County borders Jingdong County across the Lancang River to the east, Linxiang District and Gengma County to the south, Fengqing County and Yongde County to the west and Nanjian County across the Lancang River to the north.

== Administrative divisions ==
Yun County has 7 towns, 2 townships and 3 ethnic townships.

7 towns

- Aihua (爱华镇)
- Manwan (漫湾镇)
- Dachao Shanxi (大朝山西镇)
- Yongbao (涌宝镇)
- Maolan (茂兰镇)
- Xingfu (幸福镇)
- Dazhai (大寨镇)

2 townships

- Xiaojie (晓街乡)
- Chafang (茶房乡)

3 ethnic townships

- Manghuai Yi and Bulang (忙怀彝族布朗族乡)
- Lishu Yi and Dai (栗树彝族傣族乡)
- Houqing Yi (后箐彝族乡)

== Ethnic groups ==
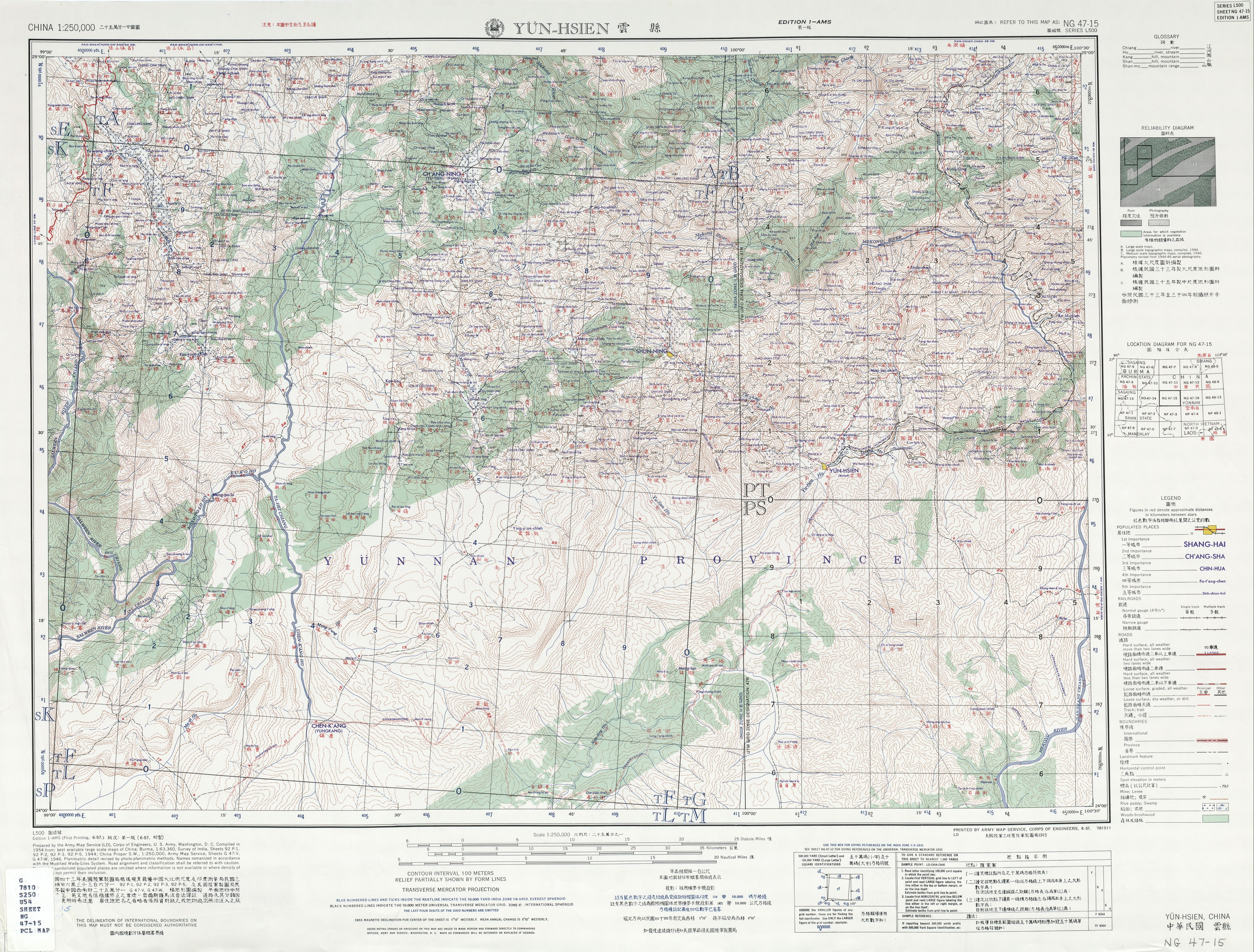
Yun County (labelled as YÜN-HSIEN 雲縣) (1954)

According to the Yun County Gazetteer (2006:527), the Limi (利米人), a Yi subgroup, and Dai, both located in Xingfu Township (幸福乡), preserve both their traditional clothing and language. However, the following peoples preserve their language, but not their traditional clothing.

- Xiangtang 香堂: Xinmin 新民, Dazhai Township 大寨镇
- Tuli 土里: Shaojie 哨街 and Houshan 后山 of Maolan Township 茂兰镇
- Luoluo 倮倮: Hewai 河外, Aihua Township 爱华镇

== Transportation ==
- China National Highway 214

== Climate ==
Climate data for Yunxian, elevation 1,109 m (3,638 ft), (1991–2020 normals, extremes 1981–present)
Month	Jan	Feb	Mar	Apr	May	Jun	Jul	Aug	Sep	Oct	Nov	Dec	Year
Record high °C (°F)	28.4 (83.1)	31.5 (88.7)	33.5 (92.3)	35.8 (96.4)	37.6 (99.7)	37.9 (100.2)	35.9 (96.6)	34.8 (94.6)	34.5 (94.1)	34.1 (93.4)	31.2 (88.2)	27.7 (81.9)	37.9 (100.2)
Mean daily maximum °C (°F)	22.6 (72.7)	24.8 (76.6)	27.8 (82.0)	29.8 (85.6)	30.5 (86.9)	30.0 (86.0)	29.0 (84.2)	29.9 (85.8)	29.3 (84.7)	27.6 (81.7)	25.0 (77.0)	22.6 (72.7)	27.4 (81.3)
Daily mean °C (°F)	13.5 (56.3)	16.0 (60.8)	19.4 (66.9)	22.1 (71.8)	24.1 (75.4)	25.0 (77.0)	24.3 (75.7)	24.3 (75.7)	23.4 (74.1)	21.0 (69.8)	17.0 (62.6)	13.8 (56.8)	20.3 (68.6)
Mean daily minimum °C (°F)	6.7 (44.1)	8.7 (47.7)	12.0 (53.6)	15.6 (60.1)	19.2 (66.6)	21.6 (70.9)	21.4 (70.5)	21.1 (70.0)	19.9 (67.8)	17.2 (63.0)	11.8 (53.2)	7.8 (46.0)	15.3 (59.5)
Record low °C (°F)	−0.3 (31.5)	2.0 (35.6)	1.7 (35.1)	9.3 (48.7)	13.0 (55.4)	16.2 (61.2)	16.0 (60.8)	17.1 (62.8)	10.9 (51.6)	8.6 (47.5)	4.4 (39.9)	−0.6 (30.9)	−0.6 (30.9)
Average precipitation mm (inches)	24.6 (0.97)	16.6 (0.65)	22.3 (0.88)	39.3 (1.55)	88.4 (3.48)	111.6 (4.39)	180.1 (7.09)	154.5 (6.08)	100.4 (3.95)	87.3 (3.44)	30.3 (1.19)	10.3 (0.41)	865.7 (34.08)
Average precipitation days (≥ 0.1 mm)	4.2	4.4	6.3	9.5	13.2	19.0	22.5	19.4	16.2	14.0	6.0	3.2	137.9
Average relative humidity (%)	67	58	53	55	63	73	80	80	80	79	76	73	70
Mean monthly sunshine hours	239.8	222.2	238.1	228.1	206.0	140.2	118.7	155.4	152.9	176.6	210.9	226.2	2,315.1
Percentage possible sunshine	72	69	64	60	50	34	29	39	42	50	65	69	54
Source: China Meteorological Administrationall-time Nov high
