= Yongde County =

Yongde County 永德县
- County
- Location of Yongde County (red) and Lincang City (pink) within Yunnan
- Coordinates: 24°01′05″N 99°15′32″E
- Country: People's Republic of China
- Province: Yunnan
- Prefecture-level city: Lincang

Area
  - Total: 3,296 km^{2} (1,273 sq mi)

Population
  - Total: 319,326
- Time zone: UTC+8 (CST)
- Postal code: 677600
- Area code: 0883
- Website: http://www.ynyd.gov.cn/

Yongde County (Chinese: 永德县; pinyin: Yǒngdé Xiàn) is a county in the west of Yunnan province, China. It is under the administration of the prefecture-level city of Lincang.

== Administrative divisions ==
Yongde County has 3 towns, 5 townships and 2 ethnic townships.

3 towns

- Dedang (德党镇)
- Xiaomengtong (小勐统镇)
- Yongkang (永康镇)

5 townships

- Mengban (勐板乡)
- Yalian (亚练乡)
- Banka (班卡乡)
- Chonggang (崇岗乡)
- Dashan (大山乡)

2 ethnic townships

- Wumulong Yi (乌木龙彝族乡
- Daxueshan Yi Lahu and Dai (大雪山彝族拉祜族傣族乡

== Ethnic groups ==
The Yongde County Gazetteer (1994:115) lists the following ethnic groups.

- Limi 利米 (Lami branch 腊米支系)
- Luoren 倮人 (Gaisu branch 改苏支系)
- Xiangtang 香堂 (Lalu branch 腊鲁支系)
- Menghua Turen 蒙化土人 (Laluo branch 腊罗支系)
- Samadu 撒马堵人 (Samo branch 洒摩支系)
- Pengzi 棚子
- Suan 蒜人

== Climate ==
Climate data for Yongde, elevation 1,606 m (5,269 ft), (1991–2020 normals, extremes 1981–present)
Month	Jan	Feb	Mar	Apr	May	Jun	Jul	Aug	Sep	Oct	Nov	Dec	Year
Record high °C (°F)	24.3 (75.7)	27.5 (81.5)	28.6 (83.5)	30.7 (87.3)	31.5 (88.7)	32.6 (90.7)	30.2 (86.4)	30.1 (86.2)	29.1 (84.4)	28.6 (83.5)	27.2 (81.0)	23.5 (74.3)	32.6 (90.7)
Mean daily maximum °C (°F)	18.5 (65.3)	20.5 (68.9)	23.4 (74.1)	25.2 (77.4)	25.5 (77.9)	25.2 (77.4)	24.5 (76.1)	25.3 (77.5)	25.0 (77.0)	23.3 (73.9)	20.8 (69.4)	18.6 (65.5)	23.0 (73.4)
Daily mean °C (°F)	12.4 (54.3)	14.5 (58.1)	17.7 (63.9)	19.7 (67.5)	20.6 (69.1)	21.2 (70.2)	20.7 (69.3)	20.9 (69.6)	20.3 (68.5)	18.4 (65.1)	15.1 (59.2)	12.5 (54.5)	17.8 (64.1)
Mean daily minimum °C (°F)	8.0 (46.4)	9.9 (49.8)	13.1 (55.6)	15.3 (59.5)	17.0 (62.6)	18.5 (65.3)	18.4 (65.1)	18.4 (65.1)	17.5 (63.5)	15.3 (59.5)	11.4 (52.5)	8.5 (47.3)	14.3 (57.7)
Record low °C (°F)	2.7 (36.9)	2.5 (36.5)	0.0 (32.0)	8.7 (47.7)	9.4 (48.9)	12.3 (54.1)	12.5 (54.5)	14.2 (57.6)	9.8 (49.6)	7.6 (45.7)	3.7 (38.7)	1.1 (34.0)	0.0 (32.0)
Average precipitation mm (inches)	31.3 (1.23)	23.7 (0.93)	31.8 (1.25)	67.3 (2.65)	125.2 (4.93)	154.2 (6.07)	251.8 (9.91)	218.8 (8.61)	151.6 (5.97)	117.2 (4.61)	41.2 (1.62)	12.6 (0.50)	1,226.7 (48.28)
Average precipitation days (≥ 0.1 mm)	3.7	4.6	6.6	11.5	17.2	23.4	26.3	23.4	19.1	15.0	6.0	3.4	160.2
Average relative humidity (%)	59	51	46	53	67	78	84	83	81	78	71	66	68
Mean monthly sunshine hours	244.8	228.6	244.8	221.8	184.3	114.4	83.6	120.1	131.0	159.0	208.4	233.7	2,174.5
Percentage possible sunshine	73	71	65	58	45	28	20	30	36	45	64	71	51
Source: China Meteorological Administration all-time extreme temperature All-time Nov Records
