= Binchuan County =

Binchuan County 宾川县 · Bil•gel xiainb
- County
- Location of Binchuan County (red) and Dali Prefecture (pink) within Yunnan province of China

- Location of the seat in Yunnan Binchuan (China)
- Coordinates: 25°49′48″N 100°35′25″E
- Country: China
- Province: Yunnan
- Autonomous prefecture: Dali
- County seat: Jinniu

Area
  - Total: 2,627 km^{2} (1,014 sq mi)

Population (2020 census)
  - Total: 341,319
  - Density: 129.9/km^{2} (336.5/sq mi)
- Time zone: UTC+8 (CST)
- Postal code: 671600
- Area code: 0872
- Köppen climate classification: Cwa
- Website: www.bc.gov.cn

Binchuan County (simplified Chinese: 宾川县; traditional Chinese: 賓川縣; pinyin: Bīnchuān Xiàn; Bai: Bil•gel) is a county in the Dali Bai Autonomous Prefecture located in the west of Yunnan Province, China. It borders Dayao County to the east, Xiangyun County to the south, Dali City to the west, and Heqing County and Yongsheng County to the north.

== Topography ==
Mount Jizu is located in Binchuan County. The county is mostly drained by the Dadan River which rises in the south west and is a tributary of the Jinsha River.

== Administrative divisions ==
Binchuan County has 8 towns and 2 ethnic townships.

8 towns

- Jinniu (金牛镇)
- Binju (宾居镇)
- Zhoucheng (州城镇)
- Daying (大营镇)
- Zhonghe (鸡足山镇)
- Lijiao (力角镇)
- Pingchuan (平川镇)
- Qiaodian (乔甸镇)

2 ethnic townships

- Zhongying Lisu and Yi Ethnic Township (钟英傈僳族彝族乡)
- Lawu Yi Ethnic Township (拉乌彝族乡)

== Ethnic groups ==
There are 251 Lahu in Binchuan County, most of whom reside in the following villages of Zhongying Lisu Ethnic Township (钟英傈僳族乡) (Dali Ethnic Gazetteer 2009:251).

- Zhimadeng Village (芝麻登村): Mizideng (米子登)
- Zhaokala Village (赵卡拉村): Yuexia (越下), Baiyangqing (白羊箐), Tanggudi (唐古地)

The Guola (过拉) people consists of 63 individuals in East Caijiawan (东蔡家湾) of Binchuan County (You 2013:134). Their autonym is Nipu (尼濮), and they are most closely related to the Yi of Dayao (大姚) and Yanfeng (盐丰). The Guola of Binchuan had originally migrated from Yanfeng County (盐丰县).

== Climate ==
Climate data for Binchuan, elevation 1,439 m (4,721 ft), (1991–2020 normals, extremes 1981–present)
Month	Jan	Feb	Mar	Apr	May	Jun	Jul	Aug	Sep	Oct	Nov	Dec	Year
Record high °C (°F)	26.8 (80.2)	29.4 (84.9)	33.0 (91.4)	35.4 (95.7)	37.6 (99.7)	37.2 (99.0)	37.5 (99.5)	34.5 (94.1)	35.0 (95.0)	32.4 (90.3)	32.0 (89.6)	27.7 (81.9)	37.6 (99.7)
Mean daily maximum °C (°F)	21.1 (70.0)	23.4 (74.1)	26.4 (79.5)	29.1 (84.4)	30.6 (87.1)	31.1 (88.0)	29.5 (85.1)	29.2 (84.6)	28.7 (83.7)	26.9 (80.4)	23.9 (75.0)	21.4 (70.5)	26.8 (80.2)
Daily mean °C (°F)	11.1 (52.0)	13.7 (56.7)	17.1 (62.8)	20.5 (68.9)	23.5 (74.3)	25.1 (77.2)	24.0 (75.2)	23.3 (73.9)	22.3 (72.1)	19.7 (67.5)	14.7 (58.5)	11.1 (52.0)	18.8 (65.9)
Mean daily minimum °C (°F)	2.4 (36.3)	4.8 (40.6)	8.4 (47.1)	12.3 (54.1)	16.7 (62.1)	19.7 (67.5)	19.9 (67.8)	19.2 (66.6)	17.8 (64.0)	14.1 (57.4)	7.4 (45.3)	2.8 (37.0)	12.1 (53.8)
Record low °C (°F)	−4.4 (24.1)	−3.0 (26.6)	−0.6 (30.9)	3.1 (37.6)	8.1 (46.6)	11.3 (52.3)	14.9 (58.8)	12.2 (54.0)	7.4 (45.3)	5.6 (42.1)	−0.3 (31.5)	−6.4 (20.5)	−6.4 (20.5)
Average precipitation mm (inches)	6.6 (0.26)	3.7 (0.15)	6.8 (0.27)	11.1 (0.44)	39.7 (1.56)	76.0 (2.99)	139.8 (5.50)	121.0 (4.76)	84.9 (3.34)	44.8 (1.76)	10.8 (0.43)	1.8 (0.07)	547 (21.53)
Average precipitation days (≥ 0.1 mm)	1.9	1.7	3.0	3.7	6.9	10.7	17.1	16.4	12.2	7.9	2.9	1.2	85.6
Average snowy days	0.1	0	0	0	0	0	0	0	0	0	0	0	0.1
Average relative humidity (%)	55	49	46	47	53	63	73	76	73	69	66	62	61
Mean monthly sunshine hours	260.6	245.6	258.1	243.7	238.5	201.6	148.0	155.5	174.5	206.2	236.1	254.5	2,622.9
Percentage possible sunshine	78	77	69	63	57	49	35	39	48	58	73	78	60
Source: China Meteorological Administrationall-time November record high
