= Yongsheng County =

Yongsheng County 永胜县
- County
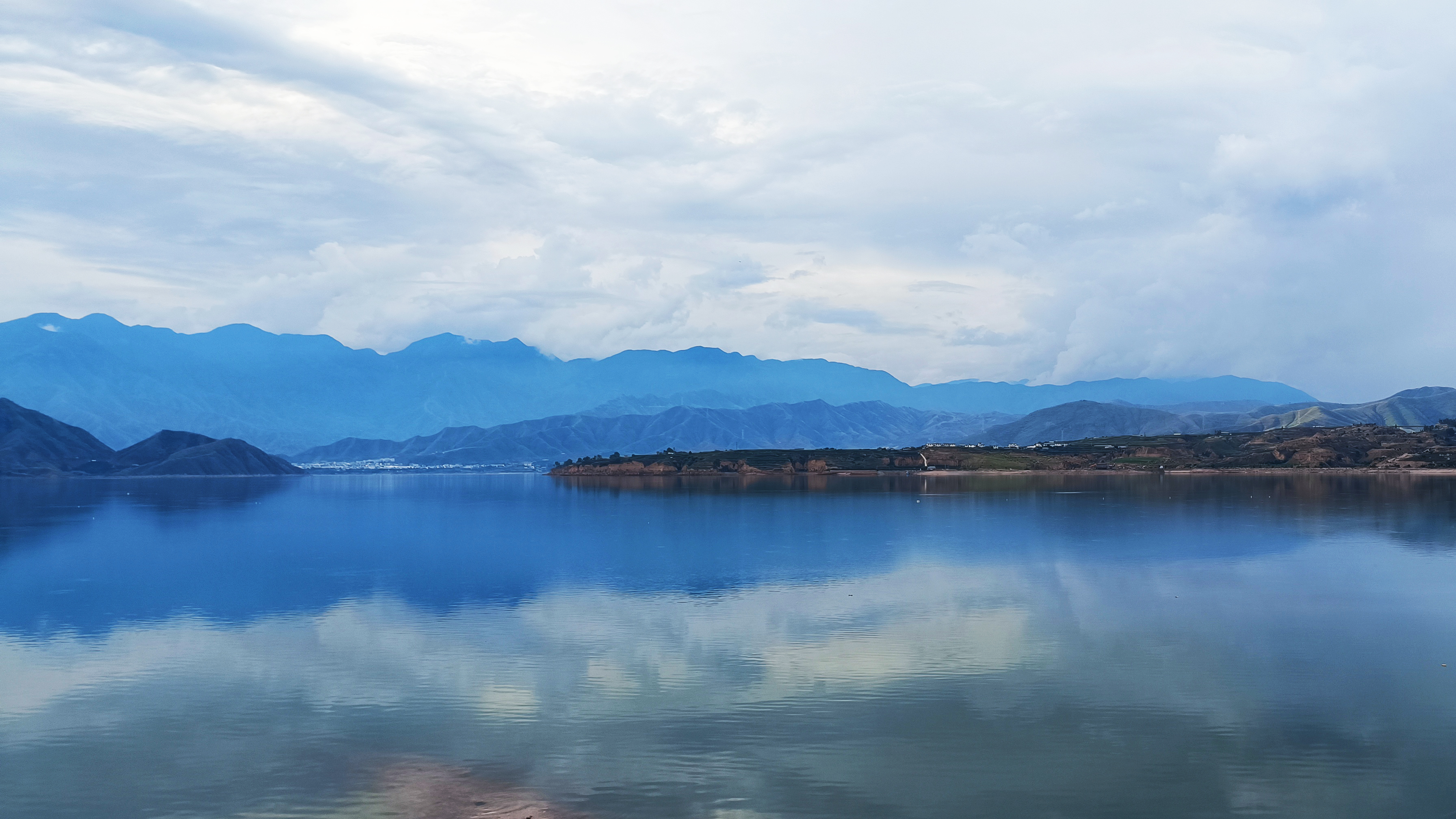

- Location of Yongsheng County (red) and Lijiang City (pink) within Yunnan

- Location of the seat in Yunnan
- Coordinates: 26°41′20.25″N 100°44′49.56″E
- Country: People's Republic of China
- Province: Yunnan
- Prefecture: Lijiang City

Area
  - County: 4,950 km^{2} (1,910 sq mi)
  - Urban: 9.42 km^{2} (3.64 sq mi)
- Elevation: 2,140 m (7,020 ft)

Population (2019)
  - County: 406,757
  - Density: 82.2/km^{2} (213/sq mi)
  - Urban: 103,437
  - Ethnic minorities: 140,012
- Time zone: UTC+8 (CST)
- Postal code: 674200
- Area code: 0888
- Vehicle registration: 云P
- Website: Archived 2008-09-29 at the Wayback Machine

Yongsheng County (simplified Chinese: 永胜县; traditional Chinese: 永勝縣; pinyin: Yǒngshèng Xiàn) is located in the northwest of Yunnan province, China. It is under the administration of the prefecture-level city of Lijiang. In 2019 the county had a population of 406,757 including 34.42% ethnic minorities.

The Chenghai Lake is located in Yongsheng. Yongsheng has a strong agricultural output consisting especially of fruits including pomegranate, oranges, grapes, mangoes, longan, and Sugar-apple.

Yongsheng County borders Huaping County to the east, Dayao County to the southeast, Yulong County and Heqing County to the west, Ninglang County and Gucheng District to the north and Binchuan County to the south.

== Administrative divisions ==
Yongsheng County has 9 towns and 6 ethnic townships.

9 towns

- Yongbei (永北镇)
- Renhe (仁和镇)
- Qina (期纳镇)
- Sanchuan (三川镇)
- Chenghai (程海镇)
- Taoyuan (涛源镇)
- Ludila (鲁地拉镇)
- Pianjiao (片角镇)
- Shunzhou (顺州镇)

6 ethnic townships

- Yangping Yi (羊坪彝族乡)
- Liude Lisu and Yi (六德傈僳族彝族乡)
- Dongshan Lisu and Yi (东山傈僳族彝族乡)
- Guanghua Lisu and Yi (光华傈僳族彝族乡)
- Songping Lisu (松坪傈僳族彝族乡)
- Da'an Yi and Naxi (大安彝族纳西族乡)

== Ethnic groups ==
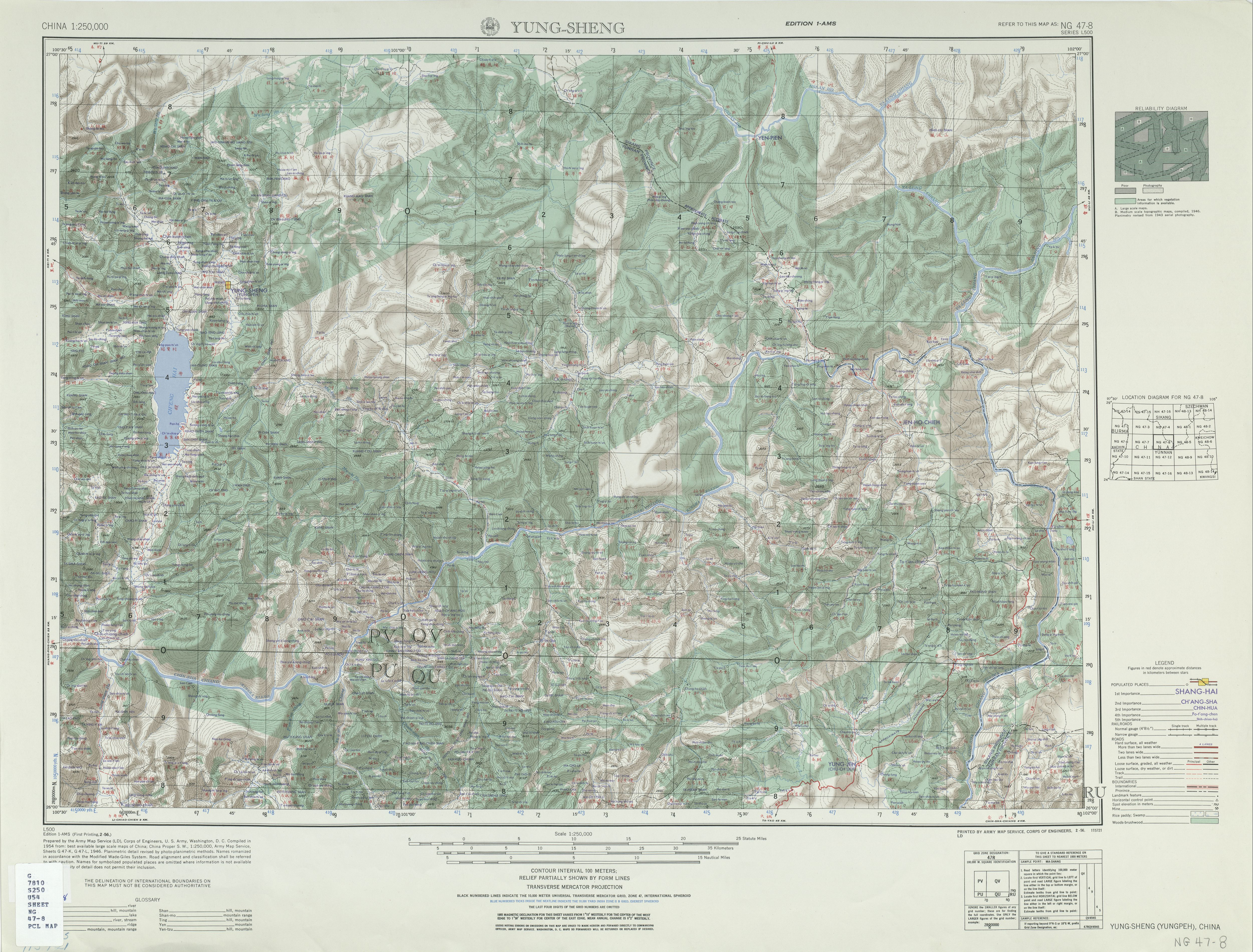
Map including Yongsheng (labeled as YUNG-SHENG (YUNGPEH) 永勝) (AMS, 1954)

The Yongsheng County Gazetteer (1989:637) lists the following ethnic Yi subgroups. Population statistics are as of 1985.

- Shuitian 水田: 12,279 persons in Renhe District 仁和区 (in Xinping 新坪, Huiyuan 汇源, and Xintian 新田); Songping District 松坪区 (in Guangmin 光明 and Yonghong 永红); Taoyuan District 涛源区 (in Jiahe 嘉禾 and Xi'an 西安); Xinaqu District 期纳区 (in Banping 半坪); Xunzhou District 顺州区 (in Ximachang 西马场, Xinhe 新河, and Banqiao 板桥); Pianjiao District 片角区 (in Shuichong 水冲)
  - Shuitian 水田 (autonym: Naru 纳儒)
  - Shui Yi 水彝 subgroup (autonym: Naruo 纳若)
  - Luoluo 倮倮 subgroup (autonym: Xiqima 洗期麻; also called Li 傈/黎)
- Taliu 他留 (autonym: Talusu 他鲁苏): 4,489 persons in Shuanghe 双河, Yushui 玉水, Yunshan 云山, and Liude 六德 townships of Liude District 六德区
- Lang'e 崀峨 (autonym: Liwusu 里乌苏): 3,490 persons in Lang'e 崀峨 and Jifu 吉福 townships of Xinghu District 星湖区
- Xiangtan 乡谈 (autonym: Awupu 阿乌浦, Awudu 阿乌堵): 2,923 persons in Peiyuan 培元, Shuiping 水坪, and Yongle 永乐 townships of Da'an District 大安区
- Tagu 他谷 (autonym: Tagupo 他谷泼): 1,200 persons in Dongshan Township 东山乡, Dongshan District 东山区
- Tujia 土家 (autonym: Lipa 利帕): 1,165 persons in Shuichong 水冲, Bujia 卜甲, and Sijiaoshan 四角山 townships of Pianjiao District 片角区
- Nazan 纳咱 (autonym: Nazansu 纳咱苏): 1,072 persons in Nazan Village 纳咱村, Liude Township 六德乡, Liude District 六德区
- Zhili 支里 (autonym: Naruo 那若): more than 300 persons in Xinying Village 新营村, Nanhua Township 南华乡, Beisheng District 北胜区; and in Xianrenhe Village 仙人河村, Dachang Township 大厂乡

== Climate ==
Climate data for Yongsheng, elevation 2,131 m (6,991 ft), (1991–2020 normals, extremes 1981–present)
Month	Jan	Feb	Mar	Apr	May	Jun	Jul	Aug	Sep	Oct	Nov	Dec	Year
Record high °C (°F)	21.2 (70.2)	23.5 (74.3)	25.8 (78.4)	29.9 (85.8)	31.2 (88.2)	31.4 (88.5)	29.8 (85.6)	28.6 (83.5)	27.6 (81.7)	27.3 (81.1)	26.8 (80.2)	20.8 (69.4)	31.4 (88.5)
Mean daily maximum °C (°F)	14.5 (58.1)	16.9 (62.4)	19.8 (67.6)	23.0 (73.4)	24.6 (76.3)	24.7 (76.5)	23.7 (74.7)	23.6 (74.5)	22.6 (72.7)	20.7 (69.3)	17.4 (63.3)	14.7 (58.5)	20.5 (68.9)
Daily mean °C (°F)	6.6 (43.9)	9.0 (48.2)	12.0 (53.6)	15.4 (59.7)	18.5 (65.3)	20.0 (68.0)	19.2 (66.6)	18.7 (65.7)	17.3 (63.1)	14.7 (58.5)	10.1 (50.2)	6.7 (44.1)	14.0 (57.2)
Mean daily minimum °C (°F)	−0.5 (31.1)	1.6 (34.9)	4.6 (40.3)	8.0 (46.4)	12.9 (55.2)	16.0 (60.8)	16.1 (61.0)	15.4 (59.7)	14.0 (57.2)	10.5 (50.9)	4.3 (39.7)	0.2 (32.4)	8.6 (47.5)
Record low °C (°F)	−6.9 (19.6)	−6.3 (20.7)	−5.0 (23.0)	0.3 (32.5)	2.5 (36.5)	9.4 (48.9)	10.5 (50.9)	8.4 (47.1)	2.5 (36.5)	3.1 (37.6)	−2.7 (27.1)	−7.1 (19.2)	−7.1 (19.2)
Average precipitation mm (inches)	7.7 (0.30)	5.2 (0.20)	9.2 (0.36)	13.7 (0.54)	56.1 (2.21)	120.8 (4.76)	255.9 (10.07)	229.4 (9.03)	151.2 (5.95)	64.8 (2.55)	12.8 (0.50)	2.1 (0.08)	928.9 (36.55)
Average precipitation days (≥ 0.1 mm)	2.5	2.8	3.9	5.2	10.0	15.2	22.4	21.1	18.3	10.9	3.2	1.2	116.7
Average snowy days	0.4	0.3	0.1	0	0	0	0	0	0	0	0.1	0.2	1.1
Average relative humidity (%)	57	51	49	51	58	72	82	84	83	77	71	66	67
Mean monthly sunshine hours	234.3	218.8	230.7	225.1	208.3	156.6	114.5	131.6	126.9	175.5	215.5	233.4	2,271.2
Percentage possible sunshine	71	68	62	58	50	38	27	33	35	50	67	72	53
Source: China Meteorological Administration All-time October highall-time November record high
