= Lipo language =

Loloish language spoken in China

Lipo
- Lolopo, Lolongo
- Native to: China
- Ethnicity: Lisu
- Native speakers: 250,000 (2007)
- Language family: Sino-Tibetan: Tibeto-Burman; Lolo–Burmese; Loloish; Lisoish; Lipo–Lolopo; Lipo
- Writing system: Pollard script

Language codes
- ISO 639-3: lpo
- Glottolog: lipo1242

The Lipo language (native name: li55 pʰɔ21; Chinese: 傈坡语), also known as eastern Lisu, is a language of the Lisu people of China, similar to but not intelligible with the Lisu language proper. Some Lipo are classified by the government as Lisu, others as Yi. In some areas, the people prefer the name Lolopo (or Lolongo).

Some Lipo (Lipa 利帕) speakers in Bingchuan and Yongsheng counties are also referred to as Tujia (土家) (Yunnan 1956:19-20).
