= Heqing County =

Heqing County 鹤庆县 · Hhop•kait xiainb
- County
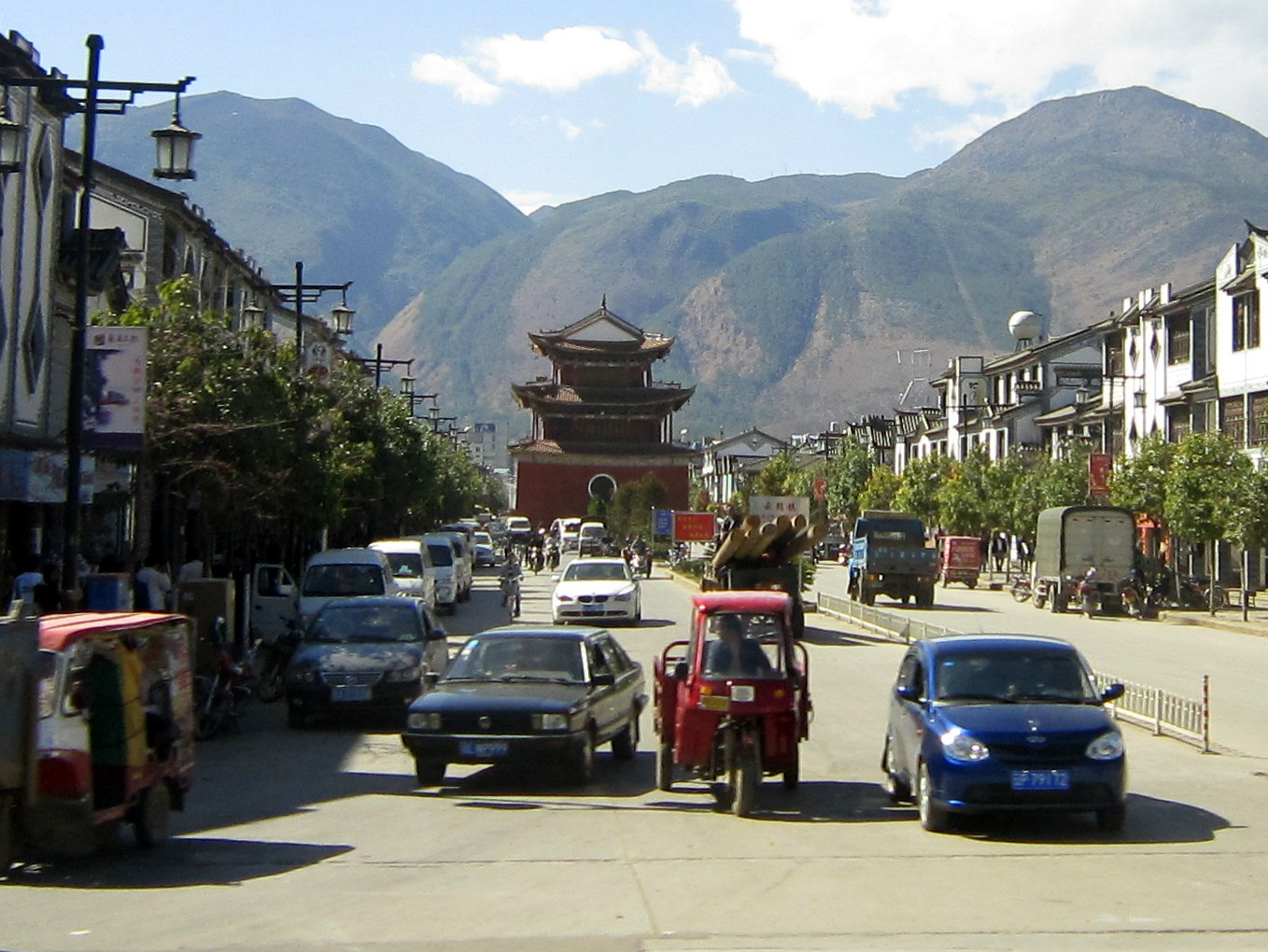
- Central Heqing

- Location of Heqing County (red) and Dali Prefecture (pink) within Yunnan province

- Location of the seat in Yunnan Heqing (China)
- Coordinates: 26°33′34″N 100°10′36″E
- Country: China
- Province: Yunnan
- Autonomous prefecture: Dali
- County seat: Yunhe

Area
  - Total: 2,395 km^{2} (925 sq mi)

Population (2020 census)
  - Total: 243,031
  - Density: 101.5/km^{2} (262.8/sq mi)
- Time zone: UTC+8 (CST)
- Postal code: 671500
- Area code: 0872
- Climate: Cwb
- Website: www.heqing.gov.cn

Heqing County (simplified Chinese: 鹤庆县; traditional Chinese: 鶴慶縣; pinyin: Hèqìng Xiàn; Bai: Hhop•kait) is a county in the Dali Bai Autonomous Prefecture located in the northwest of Yunnan Province, China. It borders Yongsheng County to the east, Binchuan County and Dali City to the south, Jianchuan County and Eryuan County to the west, and Gucheng District and Yulong County to the north.

== Administrative divisions ==
Heqing County has 7 towns, 1 township and 1 ethnic township.

7 towns

- Yunhe (云鹤镇)
- Xintun (辛屯镇)
- Songgui (松桂镇)
- Huangping (黄坪镇)
- Caohai (草海镇)
- Xiyi (西邑镇)
- Longkaikou (龙开口镇)

1 township

- Jindun Township (金墩乡)

1 ethnic township

- Liuhe Yi Ethnic Township (六合彝族乡)

== Ethnic groups ==
=== Zhuang ===
There are 855 Zhuang in Heqing County, most of whom reside in Luolang Village 洛崀村, Duomei Township 朵美乡 (Dali Ethnic Gazetteer 2009:224). Yunnan (1979) lists the name Qing 青; their autonym is Buyi 布依, while the Han Chinese refer to them as the Zhongjiazi 仲家子. They believe that their ancestors had migrated from the Langdai 郎岱 area of Guizhou. They had a population of 161 as of 1960.

== Climate ==
Climate data for Heqing, elevation 2,195 m (7,201 ft), (1991–2020 normals, extremes 1981–present)
Month	Jan	Feb	Mar	Apr	May	Jun	Jul	Aug	Sep	Oct	Nov	Dec	Year
Record high °C (°F)	25.7 (78.3)	24.4 (75.9)	28.0 (82.4)	30.0 (86.0)	32.1 (89.8)	32.7 (90.9)	31.7 (89.1)	28.0 (82.4)	27.9 (82.2)	27.1 (80.8)	26.9 (80.4)	24.0 (75.2)	32.7 (90.9)
Mean daily maximum °C (°F)	15.7 (60.3)	17.7 (63.9)	20.2 (68.4)	22.7 (72.9)	24.5 (76.1)	25.1 (77.2)	23.8 (74.8)	23.6 (74.5)	22.6 (72.7)	21.2 (70.2)	18.4 (65.1)	16.0 (60.8)	21.0 (69.7)
Daily mean °C (°F)	7.1 (44.8)	9.3 (48.7)	12.1 (53.8)	15.1 (59.2)	18.2 (64.8)	20.1 (68.2)	19.2 (66.6)	18.6 (65.5)	17.2 (63.0)	14.5 (58.1)	10.3 (50.5)	7.2 (45.0)	14.1 (57.4)
Mean daily minimum °C (°F)	−0.5 (31.1)	1.7 (35.1)	4.9 (40.8)	8.1 (46.6)	12.2 (54.0)	15.8 (60.4)	15.9 (60.6)	15.2 (59.4)	13.7 (56.7)	9.6 (49.3)	3.7 (38.7)	−0.3 (31.5)	8.3 (47.0)
Record low °C (°F)	−8.5 (16.7)	−6.7 (19.9)	−4.9 (23.2)	0.8 (33.4)	2.8 (37.0)	6.7 (44.1)	10.7 (51.3)	8.2 (46.8)	5.4 (41.7)	2.1 (35.8)	−2.9 (26.8)	−11.4 (11.5)	−11.4 (11.5)
Average precipitation mm (inches)	5.4 (0.21)	3.8 (0.15)	8.9 (0.35)	15.7 (0.62)	59.8 (2.35)	140.9 (5.55)	258.8 (10.19)	256.6 (10.10)	172.2 (6.78)	61.4 (2.42)	12.6 (0.50)	2.1 (0.08)	998.2 (39.3)
Average precipitation days (≥ 0.1 mm)	1.6	1.6	2.3	3.7	8.9	14.1	19.9	17.7	16.4	10.2	3.2	1.0	100.6
Average snowy days	0.7	0.2	0.2	0	0	0	0	0	0	0	0.1	0.1	1.3
Average relative humidity (%)	51	46	48	52	59	71	83	85	84	76	66	60	65
Mean monthly sunshine hours	243.5	239.9	271.3	263.9	238.9	178.7	148.7	164.1	135.8	181.3	214.9	230.3	2,511.3
Percentage possible sunshine	73	75	73	69	57	43	35	41	37	51	67	71	58
Source: China Meteorological Administrationall-time November record high
