= Gepo language =

Loloish language spoken in Yunnan, China

Gepo
- 𖼠𖽙𖾐 𖼀𖽑𖽙𖾑, 𖼠𖽙𖾑 𖼀𖽑𖽪
- Native to: China
- Ethnicity: Yi
- Native speakers: 100,000 (2007)
- Language family: Sino-Tibetan: Tibeto-Burman; Lolo–Burmese; Loloish; Nisoish; Northern Loloish; Nasoid; Gepo
- Writing system: Pollard script

Language codes
- ISO 639-3: Either: ygp – Gupo yyz – Ayizi
- Glottolog: gepo1234
- ELP: Ayizi

Gepo (Köpu; autonym: ko³³pʰo⁵⁵ or ko⁵⁵pʰu²¹) is a Loloish language of Yunnan, China spoken by 100,000 people. The speakers' autonym is kɔ²¹, while the "-po" of "Gepo" means 'people'. It is spoken in 6 villages of Fumin County, eastern Luquan County, and other adjacent counties to the northeast.

(Gao 2017) classifies Geipo (autonym: ke⁵⁵pʰo²¹) as a Central Ngwi language. In Wuding County, it is spoken by 250 people in Gubai Village, Shishan Township and by 30 people in Yaoying Village, Shishan Township in Micha-majority villages.

== Distribution and varieties ==
Gupo 古泼 (autonym: ko⁵⁵pʰo²¹) is spoken in Mile, Songming, Xundian, Zhanyi, Luoping, Shizong, Luxi, Shilin, Luliang, Yiliang, Fuyuan, Qiubei, Luquan, Huize, and Yiliang counties by about 100,000 speakers. Gupo speakers are also referred as the White Yi 白彝, Gan Yi 甘彝, and Little White Yi 小白彝.

The Ayizi 阿夷子 of Aimailong Village 爱买龙, Shilin County refer to themselves as Ge, and may thus speak a language related to Gepo (Bradley 2007). It is also spoken in Banqiao Township 板桥乡, and other parts of Beidacun 北大村乡.

Epo 峨颇 (autonyms: ŋo³³phu²¹, ŋo³³) is an Eastern Yi language variety spoken by about 8,000 people in the following villages of Longlin, Napo, and Xilin counties in western Guangxi.

- Longlin County (5,000+ people)
  - De'e Township 德峨乡: Agao 阿稿 (main datapoint), Nadi 那地, Zhebang 者帮, Nongbao 弄保, Tangshi 塘石, etc., in 10 villages total
  - scattered in the townships of Zhelang 者浪, Zhuchang 猪场, Changfa 场发, Kechang 克场, and Yancha 岩茶
- Napo County (2,000+ people): Dala 达腊, Zhexiang 者祥, Nianbi 念毕, Powu 坡五, etc.
- Xilin County (about 1,000 people): Bada Town 八达镇 (Yanla 岩腊 village, etc.)

A similar dialect called Wopu 窝普 is reported in Xingyi, Guizhou and Luoping County, Yunnan. The Luoping County Gazetteer (1995:601) reports that Wopu 窝普 (also called Large Black Yi 大黑彝) is spoken in the following locations in Luoping County:

- Majie Town 马街镇: Dayiben 大以本, Jiudaogou 九道沟, Jigu 吉古
- Agang Township 阿岗乡: Satuge 洒土格

Guopu 果铺 is reported in Weining County, Guizhou.

Jing (2022) documents the Gepo 葛颇 dialect of Xiaozhiyi Village 小直邑村 (Gepo name: kʰɑ⁴⁴m̩³³), Baishui Town 白水镇, Luxi County 泸西县. The village is located in the Dongshan 东山 area of Luxi County 泸西县. Some Gepo subgroups in and around Luxi County, who all refer to themselves as ko⁴⁴ or ko⁴⁴pʰu²¹, include the following (Jing 2022:2):

- diɛ²¹o³³ko⁴⁴ (or Pingba Yi 平坝彝; exonyms: Flat-headed Yi 平头彝 or Large White Yi 大白彝)
- tʂɿ⁴⁴ʂɿ⁴⁴ko⁴⁴ (or Gaoshan Yi 高山彝; exonym: Large White Yi 大白彝)
- dʐo³³bo³⁵ko⁴⁴ (or Guishan Yi 圭山彝; exonym: Small White Yi 小白彝)
