= Northern Loloish languages =

Loloish language branch

Northern Loloish
- Northern Ngwi; Nisoid
- Geographic distribution: Southern China, Vietnam
- Ethnicity: Yi
- Linguistic classification: Sino-Tibetan: Tibeto-Burman; Lolo–Burmese; Loloish; Nisoish; Northern Loloish

Language codes
- Glottolog: niso1234

The Northern Loloish languages, also known as Northern Ngwi, are a branch of the Loloish languages that includes the literary standard of the Yi people. In Lama's (2012) classification, it is called Nisoid (Nisu–Lope), which forms the Nisoish branch together with the Axi-Puoid (Southeastern Loloish) languages.

== Languages ==
Two of the six Yi languages (fangyan 方言) officially recognized by the Chinese government belong to the Northern Loloish branch.

- Northern Yi (Nuosu 诺苏)
- Eastern Yi (Nasu 纳苏)

Another officially recognized Yi language (fangyan), Southern Yi (Nisu 尼苏), may or may not be a Northern Loloish language, as Pelkey (2011) classifies it as a Southeastern Loloish language based on phonological innovations shared with Southeastern instead of Northern Loloish languages.

Other Northern Loloish languages are listed below.

- Aluo is close to Nasu.
- Chesu is close to Nasu.
- Lope, also known as Awu
- Alingpo is close to Nasu and Gepo.
- Ku of Qiubei County, Yunnan
- Luoji of Weining County, Guizhou
- Nong of Huaning County, Yunnan
- Xiqi of Huaning County, Yunnan

Nisu is classified as Southeastern Loloish by Pelkey (2011), but is traditionally classified as a Northern Loloish language.

Bradley (1997) also lists the endangered Kathu and Mo'ang languages of Wenshan Prefecture, Yunnan, China as Northern Loloish languages, but they were later classified as Mondzish by Lama (2012) and Hsiu (2014).

=== Bradley (2007) ===
Within Northern Loloish, David Bradley (2007) recognizes the Nosoid and Nasoid subgroups. Lama (2012) also recognizes a distinction between the Nuosu and Nasu clusters, with the Nuosu cluster including Nuosu and Niesu, and the Nasu cluster include Nasu, Gepu, and Nesu.

- Nosoid
  - Nuosu (Nosu)
  - Muhisu
  - Nyisu
- Nasoid
  - Nasu
  - Aluo
  - Naluo
  - Chesu
  - Gepo, Ayizi

Samei, Samataw, and Sanie are classified as Nasoid by Bradley (2007), but as Kazhuoish languages by Lama (2012).

=== Chen (2010) ===
Chen (2010) recognizes two topolects (Chinese: fangyan 方言), namely Nosu (Northern Yi) and Nasu (Eastern Yi).

- Nosu 诺苏方言
- Nasu 纳苏方言
  - Nàsū 纳苏次方言
    - Nàsū 纳苏 (na̠33su33pʰo55): 400,000 speakers in Luquan, Wuding, Xundian, Huize, Dongchuan, Songming, etc.
    - Naso, Nàsuǒ 纳索 (na̠33so33pʰo55): 300,000 speakers in Zhaotong, Ludian, Yiliang, Daguan, Yanjin, Suijiang, Yongshan, Qiaojia, Huize, etc.
    - Alo, Āluó 阿罗 (a̠55lɒ33): 100,000 speakers in Wuding, Fumin, Lufeng, etc.
    - Mongi, Mòqí 莫其 (mo21ndʑi21): 50,000 speakers in Wuding, Luquan, Songming, Kunming, Mile, etc.
  - Nersu, Nèisū 内苏次方言
    - Nersu, Nèisū 内苏 (nɤ55su13): 300,000 speakers in Weining, Shuicheng, Hezhang, Nayong, Yiliang, Huize, Xuanwei, Weixin, Zhenyong, etc.
    - Nipu, Nípǔ 尼普 (ɲi55pʰu55): 300,000 speakers in Bijie, Qianxi, Jinsha, Dafang, Zhijin, Nayong, Qingzhen, Pingba, Puding, Liuzhi, Guanling, Zhenning, etc.
  - Noso, Nuòsuǒ 诺索次方言
    - Noso, Nuòsuǒ 诺索 (nɔ55so33): 100,000 speakers in Panxian, Xingren, Pu'an, Xingyi, Qinglong, Shuicheng, Fuyuan, Luoping, etc.
    - Polo, Bǔluó 补罗 (pʰo̠55lo̠55): 50,000 speakers in Kaiyuan, Gejiu, Mengzi, Honghe, Wenshan, Yanshan, etc.

Li (2013:245) lists the following autonyms for the Yi people of these counties.

- Xide County: nɔ33su33
- Luquan County, Xundian County: na̠33so33 pʰo55
- Shilin County: ni55sɛ31 pʰu55, nɪ31/nɨ31
- Weining County: nɤ55su13
- Dafang County: ȵi55 pʰu55
- Eshan County: na33su55
- Luquan County: ni55so33 pʰo55
- Pan County: nɔ55
- Longlin County: nɔ22
- Liangshan County: ni31, nɔ22su22

Other autonyms listed by Dai (1998:218):

- Luquan County: ni55se31 phu55 (Black Yi 黑彝); mi55so33 pho55; ma33so33 pho55
- Mojiang County: ne33su55 pho21

The ne55su33 phu55 of southwestern Guizhou reside in Pingdi 坪地, Pugu 普古, and Jichangping 鸡场坪 townships, Pan County; Longchang 龙场 and Fa'er 法耳 township, Shuicheng County (Chen 1987).

== Innovations ==
Pelkey (2011:368) lists the following as Northern Ngwi innovations that had developed from Proto-Ngwi.

- Proto-Ngwi tone categories H and L flipped (*L > ˩˧ (13) in Nasu)
- Proto-Ngwi tone categories *1 and *2 merged to mid-level
- Proto-Ngwi tone category *3 > low-falling
- Lexicalized family group classifiers with frequent monosyllabic forms
- Burmic extentive paradigm is highly grammaticalized, with few lexical innovations
