= Sanie language =

Loloish language spoken in China

Sanie
- Native to: China
- Ethnicity: 17,200 Yi (2007)
- Native speakers: 8,000 (2007)
- Language family: Sino-Tibetan: Tibeto-Burman; Lolo–Burmese; Loloish; Kazhuoish; Sanie

Language codes
- ISO 639-3: ysy
- Glottolog: sani1265
- ELP: Sanie

Sanie (autonym: sɑ21 ɲɛ21 or sɑ21 ŋʷɛ21) is a Loloish language of Yunnan, China. It is similar to Samataw. There were 17,320 ethnic Sanie in 1998, but only about 8,000 spoke the Sanie language fluently. The Sanie are also known as the White Yi (白彝) (Bradley 1997).

A Sanie pinyin orthography had also been developed recently (Bradley 2005).

== Names ==
- Ngwi, David Bradley's reconstruction for the autonym of Loloish speakers, is based on the Sanie autonym sɑ21 ŋʷɛ21 (also pronounced sɑ21 ɲɛ21 by some speakers) (Bradley 2005). Proto-Ngwi *ŋw- changed into ɲ- or n- in most modern Loloish languages.

== Dialects ==
Bradley (2005) reports significant variation in the Sanie language, and briefly compares the following 6 dialects.

- East: Zhaozong 昭宗 (also in Huahongyuan and Yuhua)
- Southeast: Chejiabi 车家壁 (also in Shiju)
- Northeast: Gulu 古律
- North: Qinghe 清河
- Northwest: Luomian 罗免
- Southwest: Tuoji 妥吉

Bradley (2005) notes that the Sanie varieties spoken in the plains of Xishan District in Heilingpu, Zhaozong, and Biji Townships are particularly conservative. The East and Southeast dialects are particularly conservative in that they preserve Proto-Loloish labiovelars; the speakers call themselves the sɑ˨˩ŋʷi˨˩.

Northwest of Kunming, Sanie is locally known as Minglang 明廊, and it is sometimes classified as a Sani dialect. It is spoken in Wuding County (Lower Lemei Village 下乐美 of Chadian Township 插甸乡, and Tianxin Village 田心 of Gaoqiao Township 高桥镇) and Maoshan Township 茂山乡, Luquan County; it is probably also spoken in Fumin County. Gao (2017) reports high intermarriage rates between the Minglang and other neighboring ethnic groups.

== Distribution ==
Sanie is spoken in 76 villages, 3 of which are mixed with Nasu (Bradley 2005). 58 of these villages are in Xishan District, 13 in southwestern Fumin County, and 5 in northwestern Anning County.

- Fumin County
  - Yongding Township: 11 villages (1,121 people)
    - Qinghe Village Cluster: 5 villages
    - Wayao Village Cluster: 6 villages (some very close to the county seat)
  - Mailongqing, Mailong Village Cluster, Daying Township 大营镇: 160 people
- Xishan District (core Sanie area)
  - Gulu Township 古律彝族白族乡: 29 villages (3,390 Sanie people, < 3,000 Sanie speakers)
    - Gulu Village Cluster: 7 villages (868 Sanie people)
    - Duomu Village Cluster: 6 villages (1,442 Sanie people)
    - Lemu Village Cluster: 3 villages (1 of which is mixed with Nasu people)
    - Tuopai Village Cluster: 8 villages (394 Sanie people)
  - Tuanjie Township 团结彝族白族乡
    - Daxing Village Cluster: 7 villages (1,936 people)
    - Damei Village Cluster: 3 villages (2,322 people)
    - Qitai Village Cluster: 3 villages (2,126 people)
    - Tuoji Village Cluster: 6 villages (1,042 Sanie people)
    - Longtan Village Cluster: 1 village (585 Sanie people)
    - Yuhua Village Cluster: 3 villages (1,762 Sanie people)
    - Huahongyuan Village Cluster: 1 village (658 Sanie people, with 238 Han Chinese people); language is endangered
  - Heilingpu Township
    - Zhaozong Village Cluster: 3 villages (754 people, 195 households), which are Zhaozong Dacun, Zhaozong Xiaocun, Hedi
  - Majie Township 马街
    - Shiju village
  - Biji Township 碧鸡: 176 people
    - Chejiabi village: 750 Yi people
- Anning County: 5 villages (317 Sanie people, < 300 Sanie speakers)
  - Zhaojiazhuang Village Cluster, Qinglong Township: 4 villages; language is similar to that of Luze, southern Gulu Township
  - Houshanlang Village Cluster: 1 village (153 people) called Qingmenkou
