= Alingpo language =

Loloish language spoken in China

Alingpo
- Yiqing
- Native to: China
- Ethnicity: Yi
- Native speakers: > 20,000 (2011)
- Language family: Sino-Tibetan: Tibeto-Burman; Lolo–Burmese; Loloish; Nisoish; Southeastern Loloish; Alingpo

Language codes
- ISO 639-3: None (mis)
- Glottolog: None

Alingpo (a55 le21 pho21; Chinese: 阿灵泼; also called Yiqing 彝青 or Dry Yi 干彝) is a Loloish language of eastern Yunnan, China.

== Classification ==
Li, et al. (2011) classify Alingpo as an Eastern Yi language similar to Nasu and Gepo. However, Hsiu (2018) notes that it is a Southeastern Loloish language closely related to Lope, Axi, Azhe, and Azha.

== Distribution ==
Alingpo is spoken by tens of thousands of people in Shizong County and Luoping County. In Shilin County, Alingpo is spoken in only one village, Yimeidu village 矣美堵村, by about 100 people. In Shilin County, Alingpo speakers are surrounded by Sani speakers.
