= Chesu language =

Loloish language spoken in Yunnan, China

Chesu
- Native to: China
- Ethnicity: Yi
- Native speakers: 3,300 (2007)
- Language family: Sino-Tibetan: Tibeto-Burman; Lolo–Burmese; Loloish; Nisoish; Northern Loloish; Nasoid; Chesu

Language codes
- ISO 639-3: ych
- Glottolog: ches1238
- ELP: Chesu

Chesu 车苏 is a Loloish language spoken in southern Shuangbai County, northern Xinping County, and Eshan County in Yunnan, China.

The Chesu refer to themselves as tsu su³³pa²¹ or tɕi²¹su⁵⁵pho²¹ (Jishupo 吉输颇). Yunnan (1955) reports that Chesu is spoken mostly in Taihe Township 太和乡, with a population of over 360 as of 1955. Ethnologue reports 3,300 Chesu speakers out of an ethnic population of 6,600 people, as of 2007.

Bradley (2007) reports that Chesu is closely related to Nasu and classifies it as a Nasoid language. Chesu speakers consider themselves to be a separate ethnic group from the surrounding Nisu speakers. The Chesu language is currently being replaced by Nisu and Chinese.

Chesu is also used as a second language by Hlersu speakers.
