= Xilin County =

Xilin 西林县 · Sihlinz Yen
- County
- Location of the seat in Guangxi
- Coordinates: 24°29′23″N 105°05′38″E
- Country: China
- Autonomous region: Guangxi
- Prefecture-level city: Baise
- County seat: Bada

Area
  - Total: 2,955 km^{2} (1,141 sq mi)

Population (2020)
  - Total: 142,098
  - Density: 48.09/km^{2} (124.5/sq mi)
- Time zone: UTC+8 (China Standard)
- Postal code: 533500

Xilin County (Chinese: 西林县; pinyin: Xīlín Xiàn; Zhuang: Sihlinz Yen) is a county in the northwest of Guangxi, China, bordering Yunnan province to the south and west and Guizhou to the north. It is the westernmost county-level division of the autonomous region and is under the administration of the prefecture-level city of Baise.

== Geography ==
Xilin is located in western Guangxi. It borders Tianlin County to the east, Qiubei county, Guangnan County and Funing County, Yunnan to the south, Luoping County and Shizong County, Yunnan to the west, and Longlin County and Xingyi, Guizhou to the north.

== Administrative divisions ==
Xilin County is divided into 4 towns, 1 township and 3 ethnic townships:

towns

- Bada Town 八达镇
- Guzhang Town 古障镇
- Nalao Town 那劳镇
- Mabang Town 马蚌镇

township

- Xiping Township 西平乡

ethnic townships

- Puhe Miao Ethnic Township 普合苗族乡
- Nazuo Miao Ethnic Township 那佐苗族乡
- Zubie Yao and Miao Ethnic Township 足别瑶族苗族乡

== Climate ==
Climate data for Xilin, elevation 726 m (2,382 ft), (1991–2020 normals, extremes 1981–present)
Month	Jan	Feb	Mar	Apr	May	Jun	Jul	Aug	Sep	Oct	Nov	Dec	Year
Record high °C (°F)	31.6 (88.9)	34.4 (93.9)	37.6 (99.7)	38.8 (101.8)	41.0 (105.8)	38.9 (102.0)	37.2 (99.0)	36.5 (97.7)	36.4 (97.5)	35.9 (96.6)	33.0 (91.4)	31.2 (88.2)	41.0 (105.8)
Mean daily maximum °C (°F)	15.9 (60.6)	19.7 (67.5)	24.0 (75.2)	29.1 (84.4)	30.8 (87.4)	31.0 (87.8)	31.3 (88.3)	31.2 (88.2)	29.5 (85.1)	25.9 (78.6)	22.4 (72.3)	17.7 (63.9)	25.7 (78.3)
Daily mean °C (°F)	10.6 (51.1)	13.3 (55.9)	17.2 (63.0)	21.9 (71.4)	24.4 (75.9)	25.6 (78.1)	25.9 (78.6)	25.3 (77.5)	23.7 (74.7)	20.5 (68.9)	16.4 (61.5)	12.2 (54.0)	19.8 (67.6)
Mean daily minimum °C (°F)	7.5 (45.5)	9.1 (48.4)	12.6 (54.7)	16.8 (62.2)	19.8 (67.6)	21.9 (71.4)	22.4 (72.3)	21.8 (71.2)	20.0 (68.0)	17.3 (63.1)	12.8 (55.0)	9.0 (48.2)	15.9 (60.6)
Record low °C (°F)	−0.1 (31.8)	1.0 (33.8)	0.7 (33.3)	7.2 (45.0)	8.5 (47.3)	14.4 (57.9)	16.4 (61.5)	15.7 (60.3)	11.9 (53.4)	6.2 (43.2)	1.1 (34.0)	−2.3 (27.9)	−2.3 (27.9)
Average precipitation mm (inches)	22.7 (0.89)	18.3 (0.72)	27.9 (1.10)	47.8 (1.88)	140.8 (5.54)	215.8 (8.50)	197.0 (7.76)	157.8 (6.21)	97.8 (3.85)	63.7 (2.51)	32.8 (1.29)	21.3 (0.84)	1,043.7 (41.09)
Average precipitation days (≥ 0.1 mm)	10.9	9.7	8.9	9.7	12.9	16.5	17.4	15.8	11.2	10.5	7.4	7.3	138.2
Average snowy days	0.4	0.1	0	0	0	0	0	0	0	0	0	0.1	0.6
Average relative humidity (%)	79	74	70	68	70	78	79	80	78	79	79	78	76
Mean monthly sunshine hours	74.1	98.6	130.4	170.8	183.2	149.4	166.3	169.2	147.4	118.7	114.7	87.8	1,610.6
Percentage possible sunshine	22	31	35	45	44	37	40	42	40	33	35	27	36
Source: China Meteorological Administrationall-time October record

== Ethnic groups ==
The following ethnic groups and languages are found in Xilin county:

- Han
- Zhuang
- Miao
- Yao
  - Kim Mun language
- Yi
  - Nasu (Eastern Yi language)
  - Epo
  - Wopu
  - Kathu
- Bolyu
