= Meuma language =

Loloish language of Yunnan, China

Meuma
- Mengwu
- Native to: China
- Ethnicity: Yi
- Native speakers: < 10 (2013)
- Language family: Sino-Tibetan: (Tibeto-Burman); Lolo–Burmese; Loloish; Kazhuoish; Meuma

Language codes
- ISO 639-3: None (mis)
- Glottolog: None

Meuma (autonym: mɯ55 mɑ33) is a Loloish language spoken in Xinzhai 新寨, Mada Village 马达村, Daping Township 大坪镇, Malipo County, Yunnan. There are several semi-fluent elderly speakers, with no fluent speakers left.

The Meuma are also called Mengwu 孟武 by the Han Chinese (Malipo County Gazetteer 麻栗坡县志 (2000)).

== Classification ==
Meuma is most closely related to Samu, Sanie, and Katso of central Yunnan, thus belonging to Lama's Kazhuoish branch (Hsiu 2013, 2017).

== Sources ==
- Hsiu, Andrew. 2013. New endangered Tibeto-Burman languages of southwestern China: Mondzish, Longjia, Pherbu, and others. Presented at ICSTLL 47, Dartmouth College. doi:10.5281/zenodo.1127796
