= Eastern Yi =

The Eastern Yi may be:

- The ancient Dongyi (東夷)
- The modern Nasu people (東彝), or their language
