= Micha language =

Sino-Tibetan language of Yunnan, China

Micha
- Michie
- Central Yi
- Native to: China
- Region: Yunnan
- Ethnicity: >1,000 (1999) to 50,000 Yi (2007)
- Native speakers: 30,000 (2007) (assuming an ethnic population of 50,000)
- Language family: Sino-Tibetan: (Tibeto-Burman); Lolo–Burmese; Loloish; Lisoish; Lisu–Lalo ?; Micha; Micha

Language codes
- ISO 639-3: yiq
- Glottolog: miqi1235
- ELP: Miqie Yi

Micha, or Miqie (Chinese: 密察语; pinyin: Mìcháyǔ; autonym: mi˥tɕʰe˨˩ pʰo˨˩), is a Loloish language of Yunnan. Its usage is declining.

== Classification ==
Micha (mi55 tɕʰi21 or mi55 tɕʰe21) is most closely related to Lipo, Lolopo, and Lisu.

The autonym mi13 sɑ21 pɑ21 is used by Lalo speakers, and should not be confused with Micha.

== Distribution ==
Micha is spoken by about 9,000 persons in north-central Yunnan, in Wuding County, Luquan County, and Fumin County.

- Wuding County: Shedianxiaocun, Yongtaoxiacun, Yongtaozhongcun, Yangliuhe, Maichacun, Wodudacun, Woduxincun, Shuiduifang, Shanjudacun, Shanjuxiacun, Yangjiacun, Luomian, Xiagubai, Yanziwo, Shudecun, Dacun, Xincun, Baisha, Dashiban, Puxi Xincun, Yangliuhe, Nanshancun, Maidishan, Daxinzhuang, Yangjiucun, Nuomizha, Bizu
- Luquan County: Shanglaowu, Xiashihuiyao, Qinglongqing, Bailike, Yantang, Pingtian, Damituo, Xicun
- Fumin County: Madishangcun, Madixiacun, Madishaocun

According to the Nanjian County Gazetteer (1993), Micha (密岔) is also spoken in Nanjian County, around Aliwu (阿里勿) and Santaishan (三台山), southeast of Dali.
