= Kazhuoish languages =

Language branch in China

Kazhuoish
- Geographic distribution: Yunnan
- Linguistic classification: Sino-Tibetan: Tibeto-Burman; Lolo–Burmese; Loloish; Kazhuoish

Language codes
- Glottolog: kazh1234 (Kazhouish (partial))

The Kazhuoish languages are a branch of Loloish languages proposed by Lama (2012). There are five languages.

- Katso
- Samu
- Sanie
- Sadu
- Meuma

Samei may or may not be a Kazhuoish language.

However, Bradley (2007) classifies the Kazhuoish languages as Northern Loloish, and considers Samu and Sanie to be closely related to Nasu.
