= Sadu language =

Loloish language of Yunnan, China

Sadu
- Native to: China
- Region: central Yunnan
- Native speakers: 1,500 (2010)
- Language family: Sino-Tibetan: (Tibeto-Burman); Lolo–Burmese; Loloish; Kazhuoish; (unclassified); Sadu

Language codes
- ISO 639-3: None (mis)
- Glottolog: sadu1234
- ELP: Sadu

Sadu (autonym: sa55 du42 pho313 (Bai 2012:9)) is a Loloish language of Yuxi, central Yunnan, China.

== Classification ==
Bai (2012) classifies Sadu as a Hani (Hanoish a.k.a. Southern Loloish) language, although the speakers are officially classified by the Chinese government as ethnic Bai. Fang (2013) notes that Sadu shares many similarities with Samu (Zijun), and classifies Sadu as a Southeastern Yi language.

== Distribution ==
Sadu speakers live in 3 villages in Hongta District, Yuxi Prefecture, Yunnan (Bai 2012:3).

- Xincun 新村, Boyi Village 波衣村, Chunhe Township 春和镇 (autonym: Suonapo 所那泼)
- Dashuitang 大水塘, Boyi Village 波衣村, Chunhe Township 春和镇 (autonym: Tatapo 塔塔泼)
- Jiaoyuan 椒园, Dashiban Village 大石板村, Beicheng Township 北城镇 (autonym: Lilepo 哩期泼)

There are also Sadu people who have lost use of the Sadu language is the following locations (Bai 2012:5, 29).

- Shuanghe Yi Ethnic Township 双河彝族乡, Jinning County, in Hetao 核桃园 and Tianba 田坝村 villages
- Bailiuzhuang 柏柳庄 village, Baofeng Town 宝峰镇
