= Dongchuan, Kunming =

Dongchuan 东川区
- District
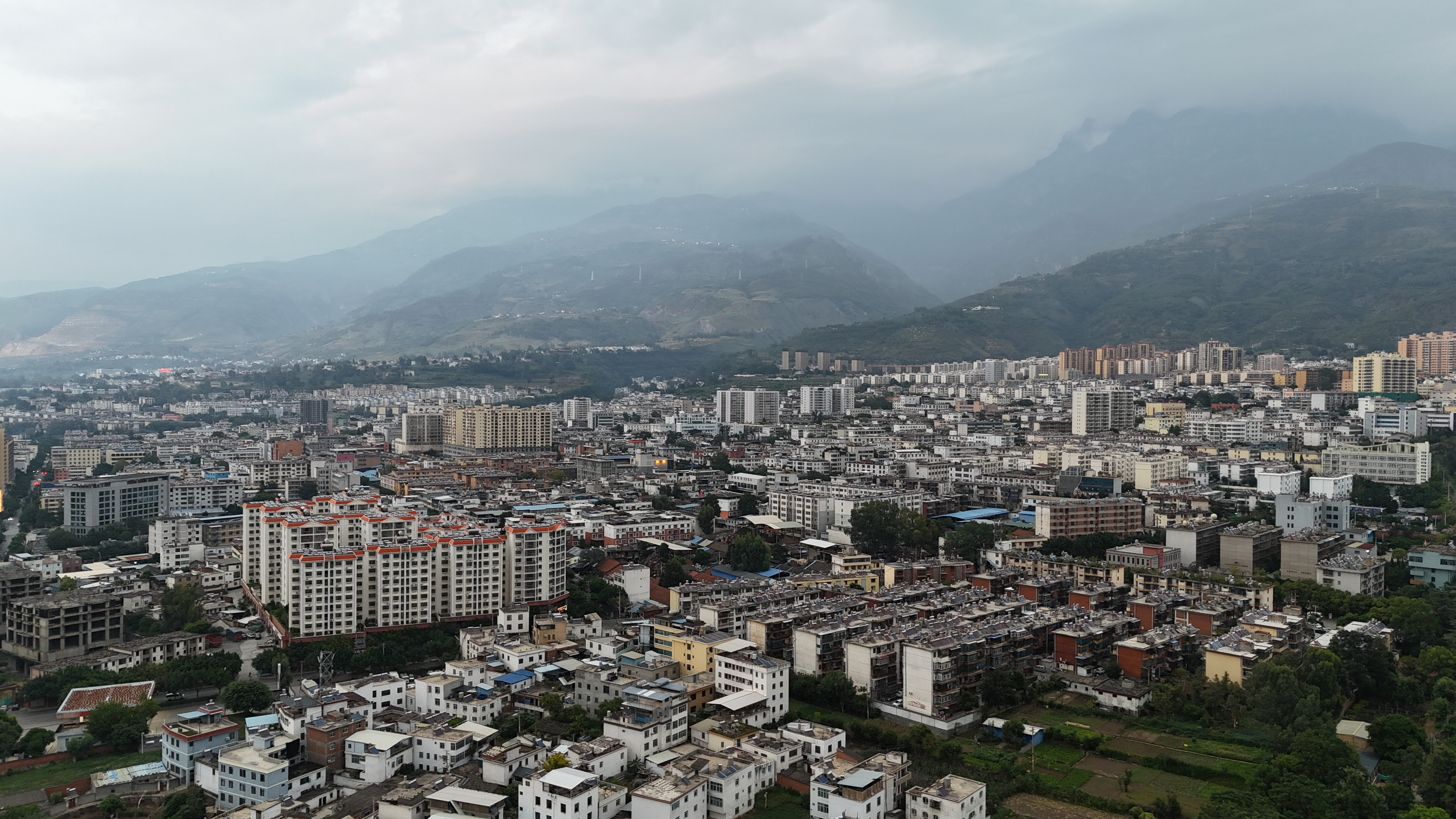
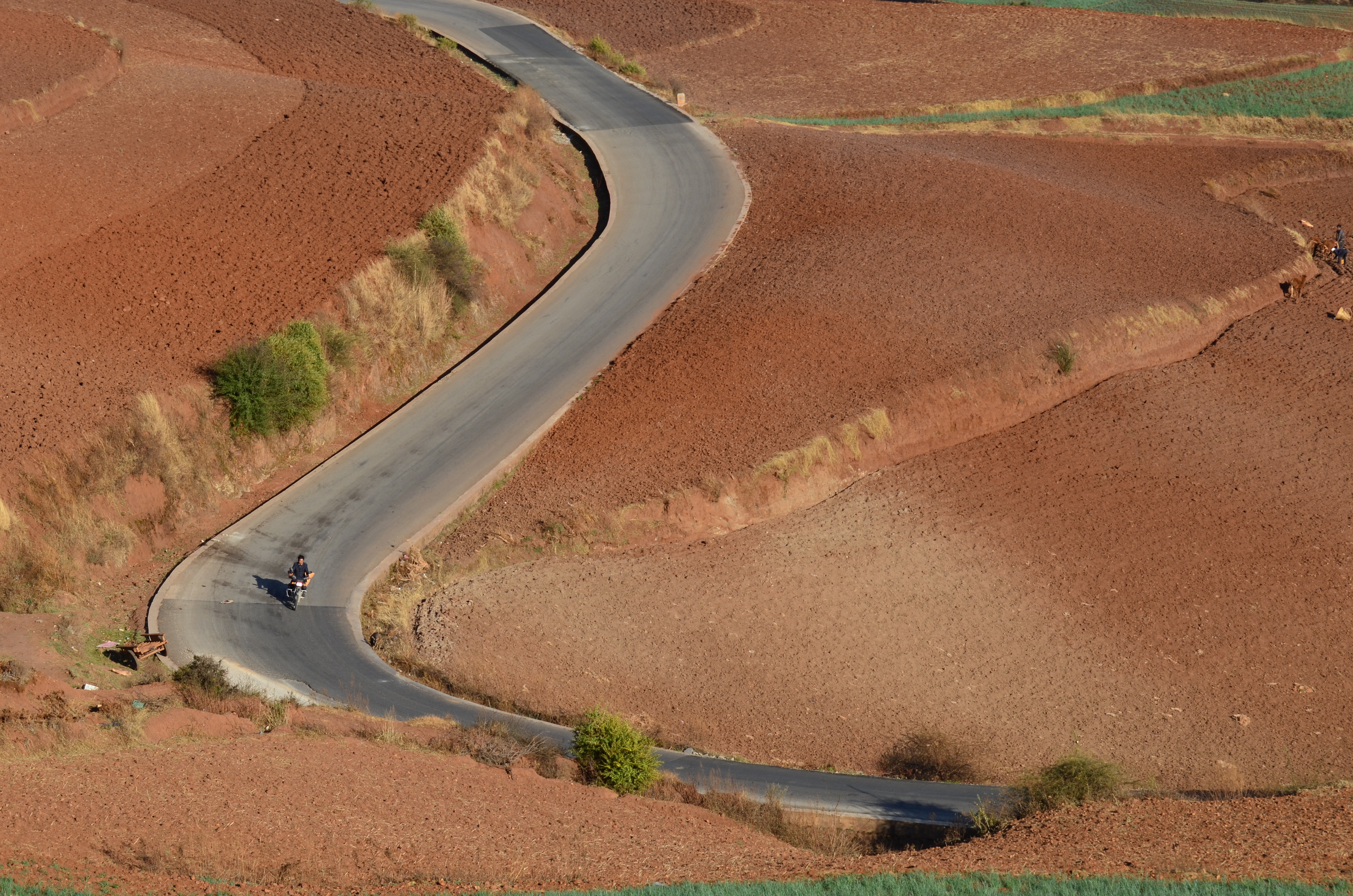
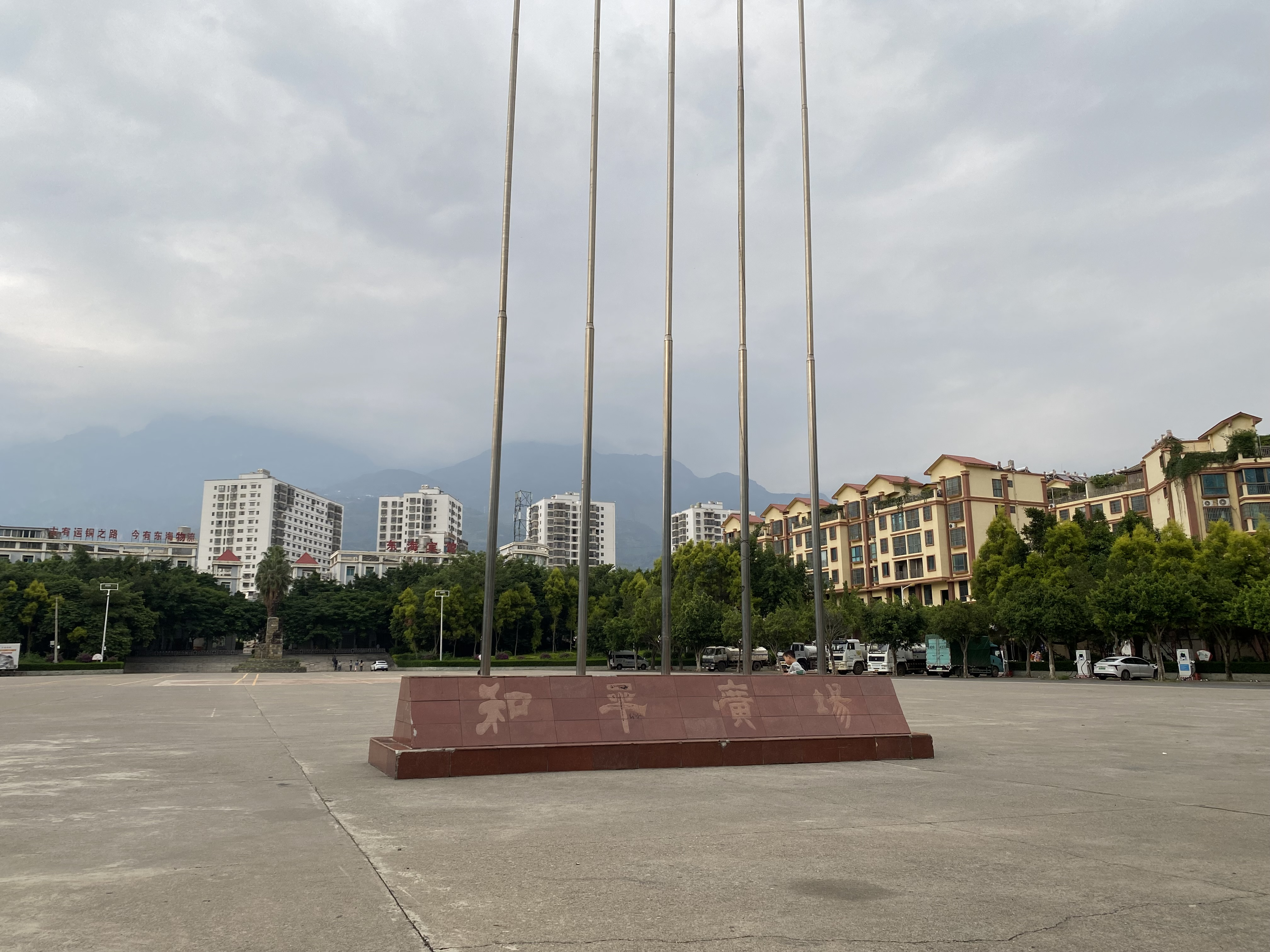
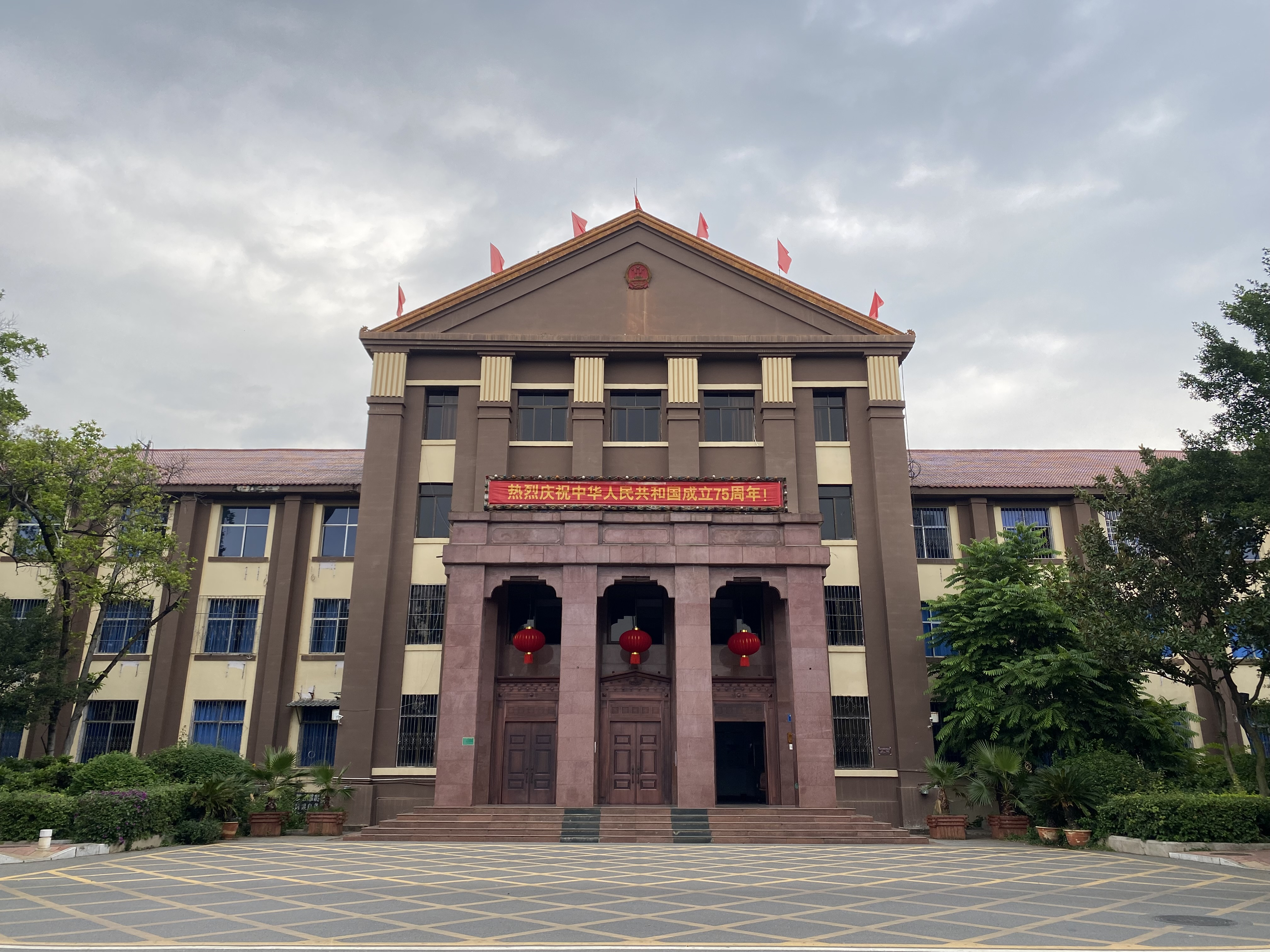
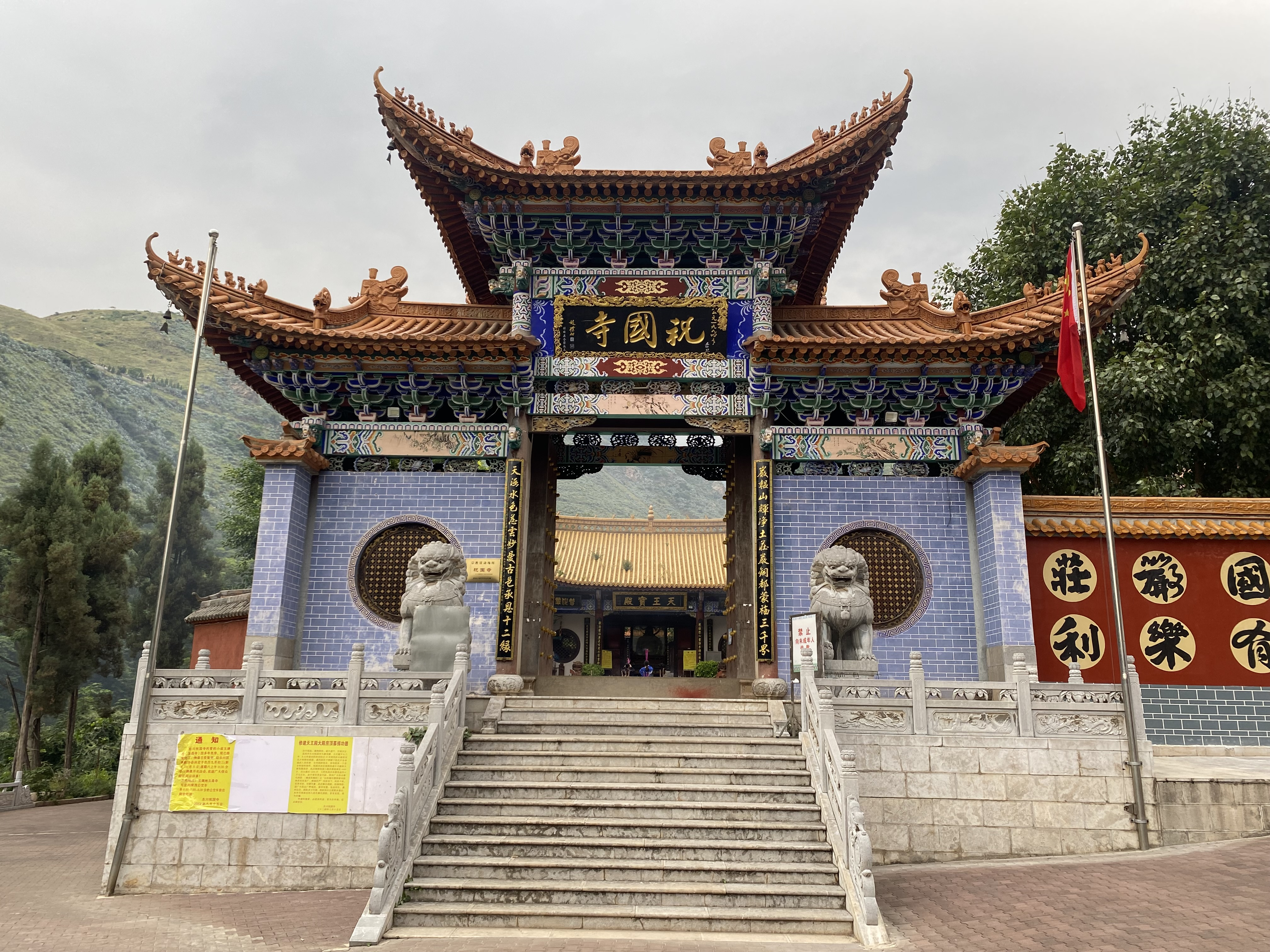
- Urban skyline Red land Peaceful Square City hall Zhuguo Temple

- Location of Dongchuan (red) within Kunming (pink), Yunnan (yellow)

- Location of the district seat in Yunnan
- Coordinates (Dongchuan government): 26°04′58″N 103°11′16″E
- Country: People's Republic of China
- Province: Yunnan
- Prefecture: Kunming

Area
  - Total: 1,858 km^{2} (717 sq mi)

Population (2020)
  - Total: 260,744
  - Density: 140.3/km^{2} (363.5/sq mi)
- Postal code: 654100
- Area code: 0871 (formerly 0881)
- Website: www.kmdc.gov.cn

Dongchuan, Kunming
- Traditional Chinese: 東川區
- Simplified Chinese: 东川区
- Literal meaning: East River District
Transcriptions
Standard Mandarin
- Hanyu Pinyin: Dōngchuān Qū
- Wade–Giles: Tung-ch'uen Ch'ü

Dongchuan District (Note: Also formerly romanized as Tung-chuen or Tung-chuen-foo.) is one of seven districts of the prefecture-level city of Kunming, the capital of Yunnan Province, People's Republic of China. The district was approved to form from the former Dongchuan City by the State Council on December 6, 1998.

== History ==
Dongchuan was upgraded to a city in 1958. In 1998, Dongchuan was merged into Kunming and became one of its districts.

== Geography ==
Dongchuan is in the north of Kunming's administrative area. It borders Huize County to the east, Xundian County to the south, Luquan County to the west, and Qiaojia County and (across the Jinsha River) the counties of Huili and Huidong in Sichuan to the north.

The district's highest point, Jiaozi Snow Mountain, is 4330 meters high, and its lowest point is 695 meters. As of 2000, Dongchuan has a population of 275,564. As of 2006, the population was 302,000.

The area around Huagou in the Wumeng mountains has become famous through photographers who discovered the unique local landscape and its Red Earth scenery in the 1990s.

== Administrative divisions ==
Th administrative divisions of Dongchuan District are:

- Tongdu Subdistrict (铜都街道)
- Bigu Subdistrict (碧谷街道)
- Tangdan Town (汤丹镇)
- Yinmin Town (因民镇)
- Awang Town (阿旺镇)
- Wulong Town (乌龙镇)
- Hongtudi Town (红土地镇)
- Tuobuka Town (拖布卡镇)
- Shekuai Village (舍块乡)

== Climate ==
Climate data for Dongchuan District, elevation 1,264 m (4,147 ft), (1991–2020 normals, extremes 1981–present)
Month	Jan	Feb	Mar	Apr	May	Jun	Jul	Aug	Sep	Oct	Nov	Dec	Year
Record high °C (°F)	30.7 (87.3)	34.9 (94.8)	36.2 (97.2)	38.5 (101.3)	40.9 (105.6)	42.2 (108.0)	38.1 (100.6)	38.2 (100.8)	37.9 (100.2)	33.9 (93.0)	33.4 (92.1)	29.7 (85.5)	42.2 (108.0)
Mean daily maximum °C (°F)	20.3 (68.5)	23.3 (73.9)	27.7 (81.9)	30.3 (86.5)	31.0 (87.8)	30.5 (86.9)	30.3 (86.5)	30.3 (86.5)	28.4 (83.1)	25.1 (77.2)	23.4 (74.1)	20.0 (68.0)	26.7 (80.1)
Daily mean °C (°F)	12.9 (55.2)	16.0 (60.8)	20.2 (68.4)	23.1 (73.6)	24.5 (76.1)	24.8 (76.6)	24.8 (76.6)	24.4 (75.9)	22.6 (72.7)	19.4 (66.9)	16.5 (61.7)	12.7 (54.9)	20.2 (68.3)
Mean daily minimum °C (°F)	7.1 (44.8)	10.1 (50.2)	14.1 (57.4)	17.3 (63.1)	19.5 (67.1)	20.8 (69.4)	21.1 (70.0)	20.4 (68.7)	18.8 (65.8)	15.5 (59.9)	11.4 (52.5)	7.3 (45.1)	15.3 (59.5)
Record low °C (°F)	−2.8 (27.0)	−1.9 (28.6)	−0.7 (30.7)	5.9 (42.6)	8.3 (46.9)	13.0 (55.4)	14.7 (58.5)	14.5 (58.1)	9.8 (49.6)	7.5 (45.5)	0.6 (33.1)	−7.5 (18.5)	−7.5 (18.5)
Average precipitation mm (inches)	16.4 (0.65)	10.8 (0.43)	14.6 (0.57)	23.4 (0.92)	68.7 (2.70)	153.0 (6.02)	138.4 (5.45)	110.8 (4.36)	89.2 (3.51)	65.1 (2.56)	21.6 (0.85)	6.8 (0.27)	718.8 (28.29)
Average precipitation days (≥ 0.1 mm)	3.7	3.7	4.7	6.4	10.9	16.2	17.7	15.9	13.5	12.6	4.6	2.7	112.6
Average snowy days	0.9	0.7	0.1	0	0	0	0	0	0	0	0.1	0.3	2.1
Average relative humidity (%)	51	43	39	42	52	67	72	71	70	70	60	57	58
Mean monthly sunshine hours	211.2	207.2	240.9	232.3	195.4	132.7	126.5	138.5	125.3	134.3	187.4	197.3	2,129
Percentage possible sunshine	64	65	64	60	47	32	30	35	34	38	58	61	49
Source: China Meteorological Administrationall-time November record high

== Ethnic groups ==
Yi ethnic subgroups in Dongchuan are Black Yi 黑彝, White Yi 白彝, and Dry Yi 干彝 (Dongchuan City Gazetteer 1995:744). The Black Yi and Dry Yi speak Eastern Yi dialects, while the White Yi speak Chinese. Autonyms of Yi subgroups in Dongchuan are Nisepu 尼色普 and Gepu 戈普.

Other ethnic groups in Dongchuan are Miao (Big Flowery Miao 大花苗 subgroup), Hui, and Han (Dongchuan City Gazetteer 1995).

== Economy ==
Dongchuan Special Industrial Park.

The Dongchuan mineral resource is rich and it has one of six biggest copper deposits in China. It is verified that there are 3.35 million tons of copper, accounting for a third of the copper reserves in the province.

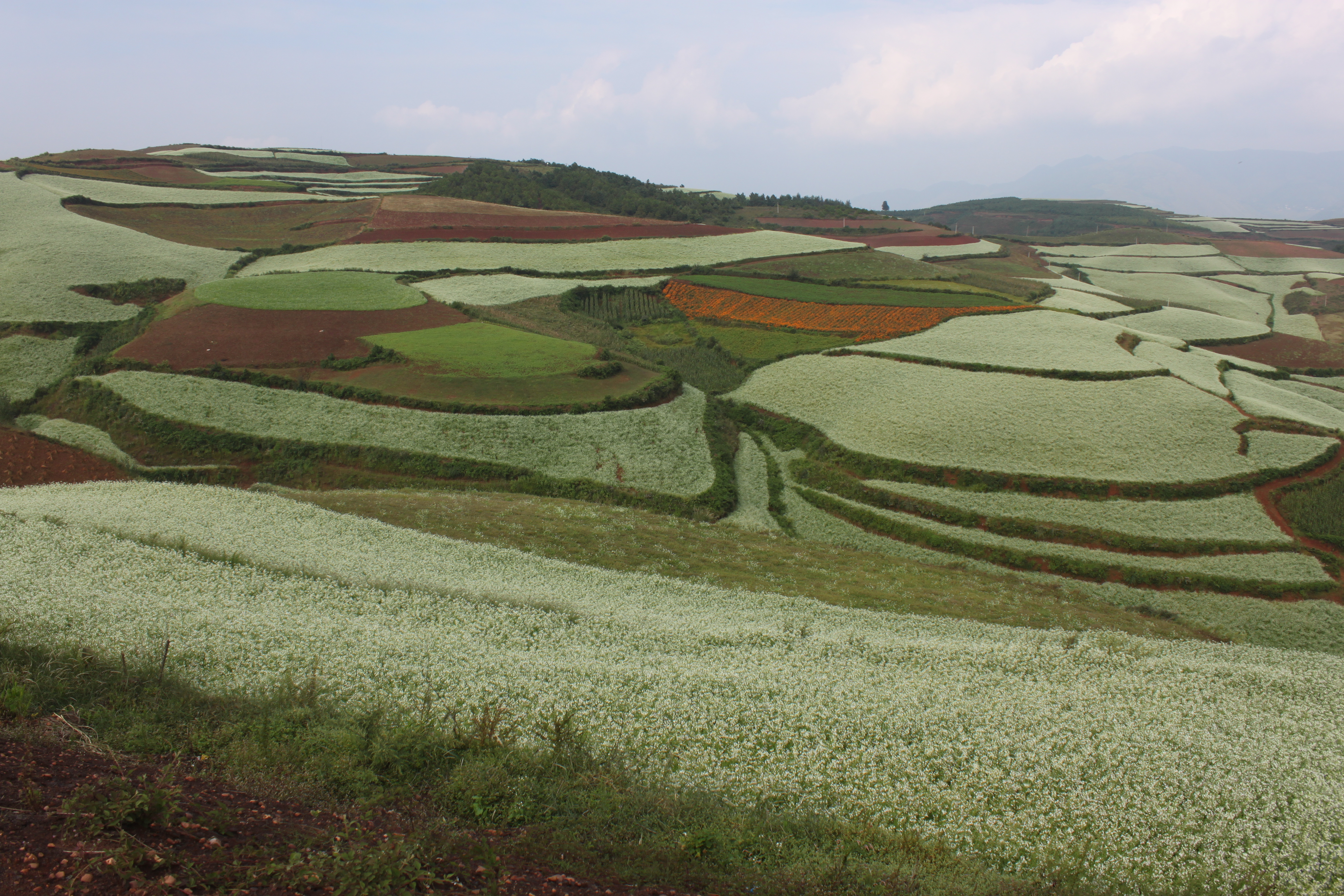
Red earth at Hongtudi

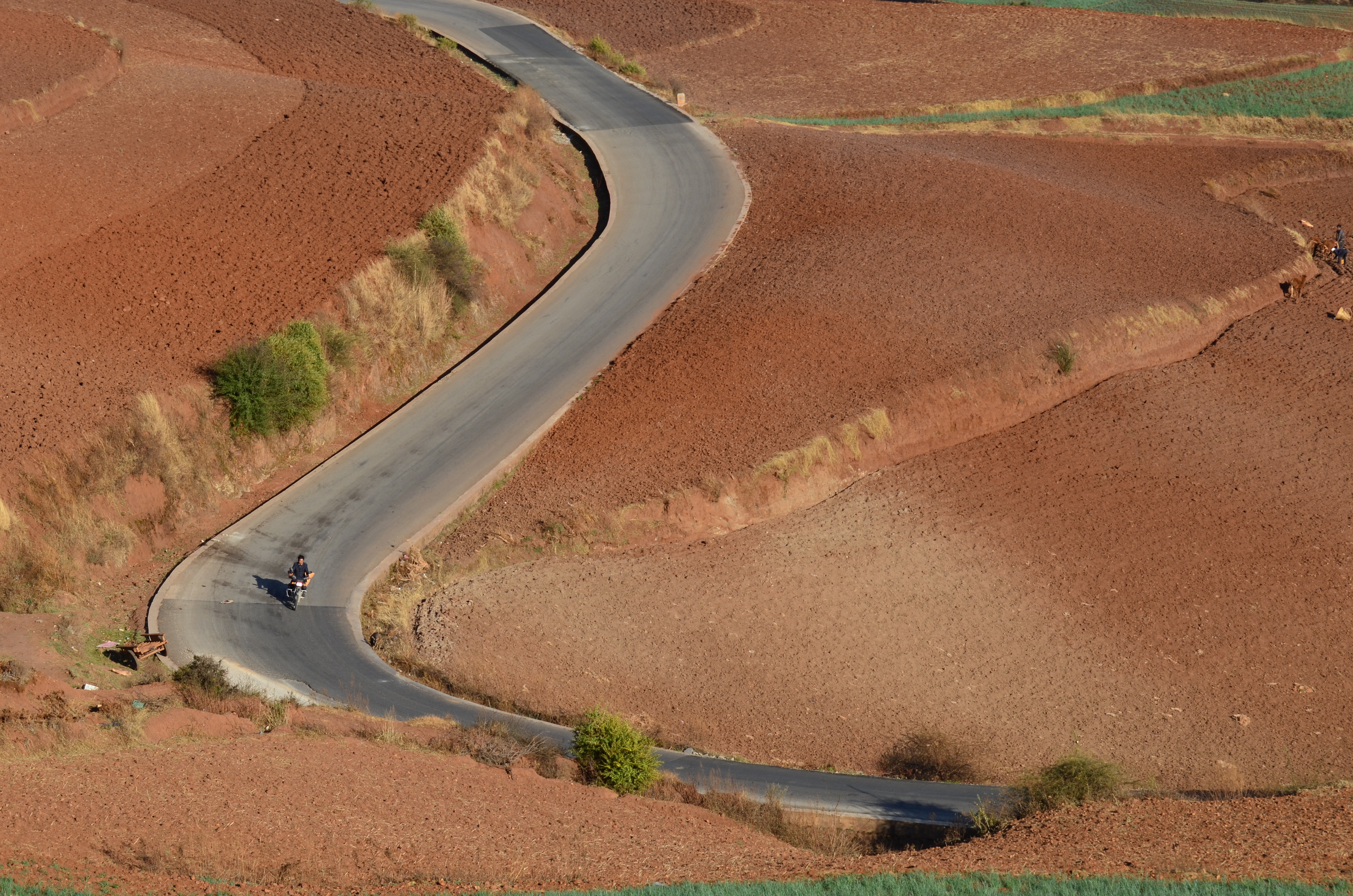
Red earth

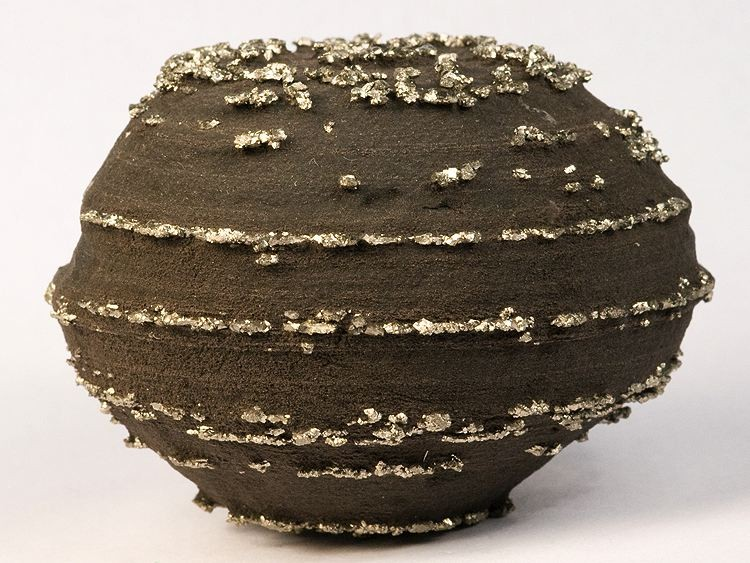
Pyrite concretion in shale

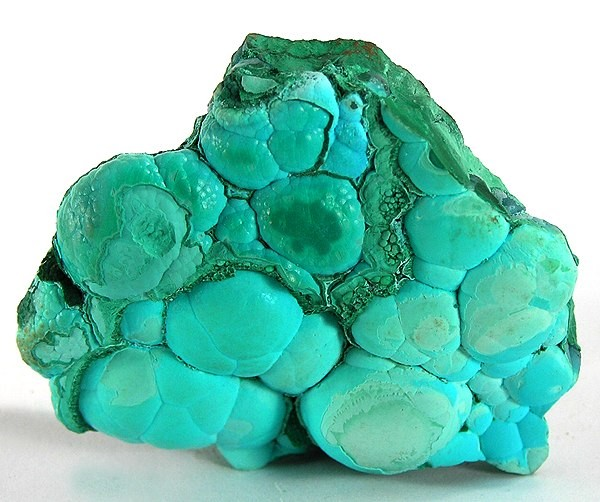
Chrysocolla and Malachite from Dongchuan
