= Aluo language =

Sino-Tibetan language spoken in China

Aluo
- Naluo
- Native to: China
- Ethnicity: Yi
- Native speakers: 25,000 (2007)
- Language family: Sino-Tibetan: Tibeto-Burman; Lolo–Burmese; Loloish; Nisoish; Northern Loloish; Nasoid; Aluo

Language codes
- ISO 639-3: yna
- Glottolog: aluo1235
- ELP: Aluo
- IETF: yna
- Aluo is classified as Definitely Endangered by the UNESCO Atlas of the World's Languages in Danger

Aluo (autonym: ɑ55 lo33 pho55; Naluo) is a Loloish language spoken by the Yi people of China. It is also known by its Nasu name (Laka, Gan Yi, Yala, Lila, Niluo).

== Names ==
Gao (2017:31) notes that in Wuding County, Yunnan, Aluo and Naluo are equivalent terms for the same Yi subgroup. Naluo in the Wuding County Gazetteer (1990) actually refers to Aluo speakers (Gao 2017:31). Naluo is not to be confused with Naruo, a Taloid (Central Loloish) language of northern Yunnan.

== Locations ==
Aluo is spoken in north Wuding, Luquan, and Yuanmou counties, Yunnan, and in Huili and Miyi counties, Sichuan. Gao (2017) reports that Aluo (autonym: a55 lu33 pʰu55; also known as the Gan Yi) is spoken in northwestern Wuding County as well as in Sichuan. YYFC (1983) documents Aluo (autonym: ʔa55 lɑ̠33 pʰo55) of Dongpo Township 东坡傣族乡, Wuding County, Yunnan.
