= Maguo River Bridge =

Maguo River Bridge 马过河特大桥
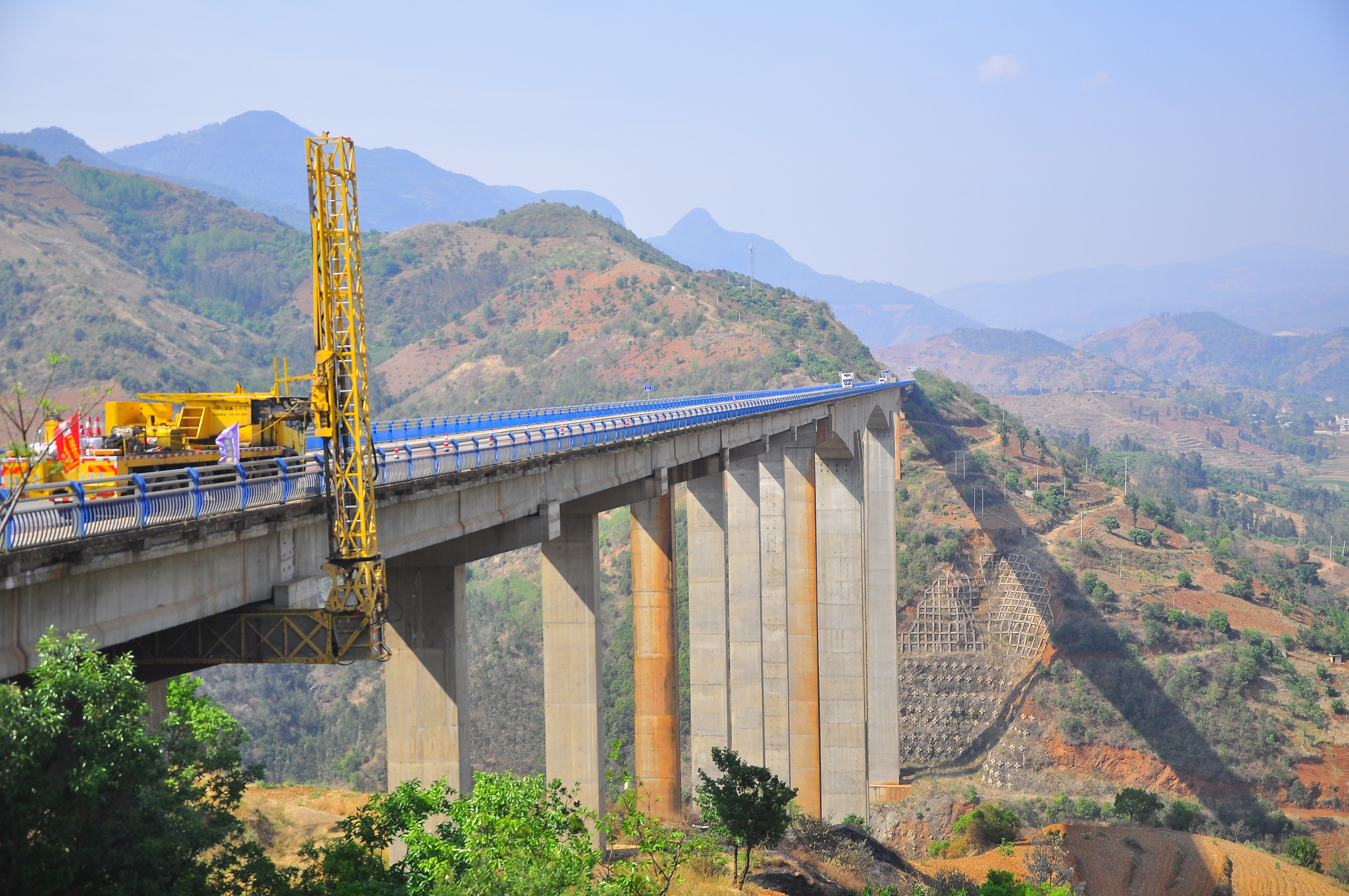
- Coordinates: 25.473769°N 102.702145°E
- Crosses: Maguo River
- Locale: Fumin County, Kunming, Yunnan

Characteristics
- Design: Beam bridge
- Total length: 756 metres (2,480 ft)
- Height: 180 metres (590 ft)
- Longest span: 190 metres (620 ft)

History
- Opened: December 12, 2012

Location
- Interactive map of Maguo River Bridge

The Maguo River Bridge is a beam bridge in Fumin County, Kunming, Yunnan, China. The bridge is part of the Jiaozishan highway. It has a main span of 190 metres (620 ft) and sits 180 metres (590 ft) above the Maguo River below.

== See also ==
- List of highest bridges in the world
