= Naluo =

Naluo or Naruo may refer to:

- Naluo Yi language (Naluo, Laluo, Alu, Gan Yi)
- Aluo language (Naluo, Gan Yi)
