= Samei =

Samei may be,

- Samei language
- Empress Samei
- Adib-ol-Saltaneh Samei
