= Nisi language =

Nisi may be:

- Nisi language (China)
- Nisi language (India)
