= Miao (Unicode block) =

- Range: U+16F00..U+16F9F (160 code points)
- Plane: SMP
- Scripts: Miao
- Major alphabets: A-Hmao; Hmong Daw
- Assigned: 149 code points
- Unused: 11 reserved code points

Unicode version history
- 6.1 (2012): 133 (+133)
- 12.0 (2019): 149 (+16)

Unicode documentation
- Code chart ∣ Web page

Miao is a Unicode block containing characters of the Pollard script, used for writing the Hmong Daw and A-Hmao languages.

== Block ==
Miao^{[1]}^{[2]} Official Unicode Consortium code chart (PDF)
| | 0 | 1 | 2 | 3 | 4 | 5 | 6 | 7 | 8 | 9 | A | B | C | D | E | F |
| U+16F0x | 𖼀 | 𖼁 | 𖼂 | 𖼃 | 𖼄 | 𖼅 | 𖼆 | 𖼇 | 𖼈 | 𖼉 | 𖼊 | 𖼋 | 𖼌 | 𖼍 | 𖼎 | 𖼏 |
| U+16F1x | 𖼐 | 𖼑 | 𖼒 | 𖼓 | 𖼔 | 𖼕 | 𖼖 | 𖼗 | 𖼘 | 𖼙 | 𖼚 | 𖼛 | 𖼜 | 𖼝 | 𖼞 | 𖼟 |
| U+16F2x | 𖼠 | 𖼡 | 𖼢 | 𖼣 | 𖼤 | 𖼥 | 𖼦 | 𖼧 | 𖼨 | 𖼩 | 𖼪 | 𖼫 | 𖼬 | 𖼭 | 𖼮 | 𖼯 |
| U+16F3x | 𖼰 | 𖼱 | 𖼲 | 𖼳 | 𖼴 | 𖼵 | 𖼶 | 𖼷 | 𖼸 | 𖼹 | 𖼺 | 𖼻 | 𖼼 | 𖼽 | 𖼾 | 𖼿 |
| U+16F4x | 𖽀 | 𖽁 | 𖽂 | 𖽃 | 𖽄 | 𖽅 | 𖽆 | 𖽇 | 𖽈 | 𖽉 | 𖽊 | | | | | 𖽏 |
| U+16F5x | 𖽐 | 𖽑 | 𖽒 | 𖽓 | 𖽔 | 𖽕 | 𖽖 | 𖽗 | 𖽘 | 𖽙 | 𖽚 | 𖽛 | 𖽜 | 𖽝 | 𖽞 | 𖽟 |
| U+16F6x | 𖽠 | 𖽡 | 𖽢 | 𖽣 | 𖽤 | 𖽥 | 𖽦 | 𖽧 | 𖽨 | 𖽩 | 𖽪 | 𖽫 | 𖽬 | 𖽭 | 𖽮 | 𖽯 |
| U+16F7x | 𖽰 | 𖽱 | 𖽲 | 𖽳 | 𖽴 | 𖽵 | 𖽶 | 𖽷 | 𖽸 | 𖽹 | 𖽺 | 𖽻 | 𖽼 | 𖽽 | 𖽾 | 𖽿 |
| U+16F8x | 𖾀 | 𖾁 | 𖾂 | 𖾃 | 𖾄 | 𖾅 | 𖾆 | 𖾇 | | | | | | | | 𖾏 |
| U+16F9x | 𖾐 | 𖾑 | 𖾒 | 𖾓 | 𖾔 | 𖾕 | 𖾖 | 𖾗 | 𖾘 | 𖾙 | 𖾚 | 𖾛 | 𖾜 | 𖾝 | 𖾞 | 𖾟 |
Notes: 1. As of Unicode version 16.0; 2. Grey areas indicate non-assigned code points

== History ==
The following Unicode-related documents record the purpose and process of defining specific characters in the Miao block:

| Version | Final code points (Note: Proposed code points and characters names may differ from final code points and names) | Count | L2 ID | WG2 ID | Document |
|---|---|---|---|---|---|
| 6.1 | U+16F00..16F0B, 16F0D..16F11, 16F13..16F30, 16F32..16F44, 16F50..16F55, 16F57..16F5A, 16F5C..16F7E, 16F8F..16F9F | 128 | L2/97-104 | | Jenkins, John H. (1997-05-21), Proposal to add Pollard to ISO/IEC 10646 |
| 6.1 | U+16F00..16F0B, 16F0D..16F11, 16F13..16F30, 16F32..16F44, 16F50..16F55, 16F57..16F5A, 16F5C..16F7E, 16F8F..16F9F | 128 | | N1574 | Proposal to add Pollard Syllabary, 1997-06-10 |
| 6.1 | U+16F00..16F0B, 16F0D..16F11, 16F13..16F30, 16F32..16F44, 16F50..16F55, 16F57..16F5A, 16F5C..16F7E, 16F8F..16F9F | 128 | L2/97-288 | N1603 | Umamaheswaran, V. S. (1997-10-24), "8.24.2", Unconfirmed Meeting Minutes, WG 2 Meeting # 33, Heraklion, Crete, Greece, 20 June – 4 July 1997 |
| 6.1 | U+16F00..16F0B, 16F0D..16F11, 16F13..16F30, 16F32..16F44, 16F50..16F55, 16F57..16F5A, 16F5C..16F7E, 16F8F..16F9F | 128 | | N3353 (pdf, doc) | Umamaheswaran, V. S. (2007-10-10), "M51.31", Unconfirmed minutes of WG 2 meeting 51 Hanzhou, China; 2007-04-24/27 |
| 6.1 | U+16F00..16F0B, 16F0D..16F11, 16F13..16F30, 16F32..16F44, 16F50..16F55, 16F57..16F5A, 16F5C..16F7E, 16F8F..16F9F | 128 | L2/07-299 | N3335 | Preliminary proposal for encoding the Northeastern Yunnan Simple Miao script, 2007-09-14 |
| 6.1 | U+16F00..16F0B, 16F0D..16F11, 16F13..16F30, 16F32..16F44, 16F50..16F55, 16F57..16F5A, 16F5C..16F7E, 16F8F..16F9F | 128 | L2/07-352 | | Anderson, Deborah (2007-10-10), Feedback on L2/07-299 Preliminary Proposal for Northeastern Yunnan Simple Miao (WG2 N3335) |
| 6.1 | U+16F00..16F0B, 16F0D..16F11, 16F13..16F30, 16F32..16F44, 16F50..16F55, 16F57..16F5A, 16F5C..16F7E, 16F8F..16F9F | 128 | L2/09-253R | N3669R | Fickle, Erich (2009-10-01), Proposal for encoding the Miao Script |
| 6.1 | U+16F00..16F0B, 16F0D..16F11, 16F13..16F30, 16F32..16F44, 16F50..16F55, 16F57..16F5A, 16F5C..16F7E, 16F8F..16F9F | 128 | L2/09-415 | N3730 | Miao Ad-Hoc Meeting Report, 2009-10-28 |
| 6.1 | U+16F00..16F0B, 16F0D..16F11, 16F13..16F30, 16F32..16F44, 16F50..16F55, 16F57..16F5A, 16F5C..16F7E, 16F8F..16F9F | 128 | | N3703 (pdf, doc) | Umamaheswaran, V. S. (2010-04-13), "M55.29", Unconfirmed minutes of WG 2 meeting no. 55, Tokyo 2009-10-26/30 |
| 6.1 | U+16F00..16F0B, 16F0D..16F11, 16F13..16F30, 16F32..16F44, 16F50..16F55, 16F57..16F5A, 16F5C..16F7E, 16F8F..16F9F | 128 | L2/10-049 | N3761 | Everson, Michael; et al. (2010-01-28), Towards a proposal for encoding Miao script in the SMP of the UCS |
| 6.1 | U+16F00..16F0B, 16F0D..16F11, 16F13..16F30, 16F32..16F44, 16F50..16F55, 16F57..16F5A, 16F5C..16F7E, 16F8F..16F9F | 128 | L2/10-093 | N3789 | Final proposal for encoding the Miao script in the SMP of the UCS, 2010-03-26 |
| 6.1 | U+16F00..16F0B, 16F0D..16F11, 16F13..16F30, 16F32..16F44, 16F50..16F55, 16F57..16F5A, 16F5C..16F7E, 16F8F..16F9F | 128 | L2/10-108 | | Moore, Lisa (2010-05-19), "Consensus 123-C10, 123-C16", UTC #123 / L2 #220 Minutes |
| 6.1 | U+16F00..16F0B, 16F0D..16F11, 16F13..16F30, 16F32..16F44, 16F50..16F55, 16F57..16F5A, 16F5C..16F7E, 16F8F..16F9F | 128 | | N3803 (pdf, doc) | "M56.10", Unconfirmed minutes of WG 2 meeting no. 56, 2010-09-24 |
| 6.1 | U+16F00..16F0B, 16F0D..16F11, 16F13..16F30, 16F32..16F44, 16F50..16F55, 16F57..16F5A, 16F5C..16F7E, 16F8F..16F9F | 128 | L2/18-326R | | Chan, Eiso (2018-11-09), Annotation modifications for Miao block |
| 6.1 | U+16F00..16F0B, 16F0D..16F11, 16F13..16F30, 16F32..16F44, 16F50..16F55, 16F57..16F5A, 16F5C..16F7E, 16F8F..16F9F | 128 | L2/19-008 | | Moore, Lisa (2019-02-08), "C.11", UTC #158 Minutes |
| 6.1 | U+16F0C, 16F12, 16F31, 16F56, 16F5B | 5 | L2/10-302 | N3877 | Everson, Michael; Fickle, Erich (2010-08-08), Proposal for encoding additional Miao characters in the SMP |
| 6.1 | U+16F0C, 16F12, 16F31, 16F56, 16F5B | 5 | L2/10-221 | | Moore, Lisa (2010-08-23), "C.28", UTC #124 / L2 #221 Minutes |
| 6.1 | U+16F0C, 16F12, 16F31, 16F56, 16F5B | 5 | | N3903 (pdf, doc) | "M57.11", Unconfirmed minutes of WG2 meeting 57, 2011-03-31 |
| 12.0 | U+16F45..16F4A, 16F4F, 16F7F..16F87 | 16 | L2/17-345 | N4845 | Cheuk, Adrian (2017-10-03), Additions to the Miao Script |
| 12.0 | U+16F45..16F4A, 16F4F, 16F7F..16F87 | 16 | | N4953 (pdf, doc) | "M66.13", Unconfirmed minutes of WG 2 meeting 66, 2018-03-23 |
| 12.0 | U+16F45..16F4A, 16F4F, 16F7F..16F87 | 16 | L2/17-384 | | Anderson, Deborah; Whistler, Ken; Pournader, Roozbeh; Moore, Lisa; Liang, Hai (2017-10-22), "11. Miao", Recommendations to UTC #153 October 2017 on Script Proposals |
| 12.0 | U+16F45..16F4A, 16F4F, 16F7F..16F87 | 16 | L2/17-362 | | Moore, Lisa (2018-02-02), "Consensus 153-C18 and 153-C23", UTC #153 Minutes |
