= Wuding County =

Wuding County 武定县
- County
- Location of Wuding County in Chuxiong Prefecture within Yunnan province

- Location of the seat in Yunnan
- Coordinates: 25°31′48″N 102°24′14″E
- Country: People's Republic of China
- Province: Yunnan
- Autonomous prefecture: Chuxiong

Area
  - Total: 3,322 km^{2} (1,283 sq mi)
- Highest elevation (Bailonghui (白龙会)): 2,956 m (9,698 ft)
- Lowest elevation (Jinsha River): 862 m (2,828 ft)

Population
  - Total: 260,000
  - Density: 78/km^{2} (200/sq mi)
- Time zone: UTC+8 (CST)
- Postal code: 651600
- Area code: 0878
- Website: www.wuding.gov.cn

Wuding County (Chinese: 武定县; pinyin: Wǔdìng Xiàn; Chuxiong Yi script:, IPA: /lo^{33} di^{33} bu^{33}/) is under the administration of the Chuxiong Yi Autonomous Prefecture, in the north-central part of Yunnan province, China, bordering Sichuan province to the north. Wuding's county seat is located only 5 km from the seat of Luquan Yi and Miao Autonomous County. It is a centre for titanium production.

Wuding County borders Luquan County to the east, Fumin County and Lufeng, Yunnan to the south, Yuanmou County to the west, and Huili of Sichuan to the north.

== History ==
Wuding was historically more important, being the center of a Zhou, equivalent to a prefecture-level division. The prefecture was established in 1567. In 1953 the administrative seat of the division moved to Chuxiong.

== Administrative divisions ==
Wuding County has 7 towns, 3 townships and 1 ethnic township.

7 towns

- Shishan (狮山镇)
- Gaoqiao (高桥镇)
- Maojie (猫街镇)
- Chadian (插甸镇)
- Bailu (白路镇)
- Wande (万德镇)
- Jiyi (己衣镇)

3 townships

- Tianxin (田心乡)
- Fawo (发窝乡)
- Huanzhou (环州乡)

1 ethnic township

- Dongpo Dai (东坡傣族乡)

== Ethnic groups ==
=== Yi ===
The Wuding County Gazetteer (1990) lists the following Yi subgroups.

- Nasu 纳苏 / Black Yi 黑彝
- Naluo 纳罗 / Gan Yi 甘彝
- Naisu 乃苏 / Red Yi 红彝
- Miqie 密切 / Micha 密岔
- Luoluo 罗罗 / White Yi 白彝
- Sani 撒尼 / Minglang 明郎

=== Hani ===
In Wuding County, ethnic Hani are found in the following locations (Wuding County Gazetteer 1990:141).

- Chayiyang 扯衣咩村, Ande Township 安得乡, Chadian District 插甸区
- Lower Village 下村 and Azhemi 阿者咪村 of Dacun Township 大村乡
- Zhong 中村, Xia 下村, Yangliuhe 杨柳河, and Aozi 凹子 of Huaqiao Township 花乔乡
- Shedian Village 赊甸村, Laotao Township 老滔乡

According to the Chuxiong Prefecture Gazetteer (1993:411), the Luomian 罗缅, a Hani subgroup, are located in Nigagu 尼嘎古.

== Languages ==
Gao (2017) lists the following languages of Wuding County. Gao (2017) classifies Geipo of Wuding County as closely related to Miqie, and is not the same as the Northern Loloish language Gepo.

Group	Autonym	Language classification	Population
Nasu	na³³su³³ pʰo³³	Ngwi, Northern	28,000
Aluo	a⁵⁵lu³³ pʰu⁵⁵	Ngwi, Northern	13,500
Naisu	ne⁵⁵su³³ pʰo⁵⁵	Ngwi, Northern	6,000
Lipo	li³³ pʰo²¹	Ngwi, Central	31,000
Miqie	mi⁵⁵tɕʰi³¹ pʰo³¹	Ngwi, Central	9,000
Lolo	lo³³lo³³ pʰo²¹	Ngwi, Central	8,500
Geipo	ke⁵⁵ pʰo³¹	Ngwi, Central	350
Hani	xo²¹ȵi²¹ pʰɑ²¹	Ngwi, Southern	800
Ahmao	a³⁵hmo³³ kləu³¹	Hmong, Chuanqiandian Dongdianbei	21,000
Hmong	mɛŋ⁴⁴ kləu⁵³	Hmong, Chuanqiandian proper	3,000
Tai	tai⁵⁵	Tai Hongjin, Yongwu	8,000

== Climate ==
Climate data for Wuding, elevation 1,799 m (5,902 ft), (1991–2020 normals, extremes 1981–present)
Month	Jan	Feb	Mar	Apr	May	Jun	Jul	Aug	Sep	Oct	Nov	Dec	Year
Record high °C (°F)	24.5 (76.1)	26.1 (79.0)	29.2 (84.6)	32.4 (90.3)	32.8 (91.0)	31.6 (88.9)	32.7 (90.9)	31.3 (88.3)	31.7 (89.1)	28.6 (83.5)	27.4 (81.3)	22.6 (72.7)	32.8 (91.0)
Mean daily maximum °C (°F)	16.7 (62.1)	19.7 (67.5)	22.8 (73.0)	26.1 (79.0)	26.5 (79.7)	26.4 (79.5)	26.1 (79.0)	26.2 (79.2)	25.0 (77.0)	22.4 (72.3)	19.4 (66.9)	16.3 (61.3)	22.8 (73.0)
Daily mean °C (°F)	7.4 (45.3)	9.8 (49.6)	13.0 (55.4)	17.1 (62.8)	20.0 (68.0)	21.2 (70.2)	20.8 (69.4)	20.2 (68.4)	18.9 (66.0)	16.3 (61.3)	11.6 (52.9)	7.9 (46.2)	15.4 (59.6)
Mean daily minimum °C (°F)	0.4 (32.7)	1.6 (34.9)	4.5 (40.1)	8.9 (48.0)	14.4 (57.9)	17.4 (63.3)	17.6 (63.7)	16.8 (62.2)	15.4 (59.7)	12.6 (54.7)	6.4 (43.5)	2.0 (35.6)	9.8 (49.7)
Record low °C (°F)	−7.0 (19.4)	−5.0 (23.0)	−3.5 (25.7)	0.7 (33.3)	5.1 (41.2)	10.2 (50.4)	11.8 (53.2)	10.3 (50.5)	6.1 (43.0)	4.4 (39.9)	−2.2 (28.0)	−6.4 (20.5)	−7.0 (19.4)
Average precipitation mm (inches)	21.9 (0.86)	11.0 (0.43)	15.3 (0.60)	26.7 (1.05)	82.3 (3.24)	173.0 (6.81)	201.3 (7.93)	154.9 (6.10)	123.0 (4.84)	90.9 (3.58)	28.9 (1.14)	11.5 (0.45)	940.7 (37.03)
Average precipitation days (≥ 0.1 mm)	4.2	3.4	4.8	6.7	10.2	15.7	20.4	18.5	14.8	12.3	5.3	3.4	119.7
Average snowy days	0.7	0.3	0.2	0	0	0	0	0	0	0	0.1	0.3	1.6
Average relative humidity (%)	72	63	60	58	64	77	84	84	82	81	78	77	73
Mean monthly sunshine hours	219.7	221.9	246.2	244.9	218.6	157.3	128.0	145.6	127.0	145.4	183.2	189.4	2,227.2
Percentage possible sunshine	66	69	66	64	53	38	31	36	35	41	57	58	51
Source: China Meteorological Administrationall-time November record high
