= Bailu, Yunnan =

Bailu 白路镇
- Town
- Location in Yunnan
- Coordinates: 25°39′18″N 102°2′56″E
- Country: People's Republic of China
- Province: Yunnan
- Autonomous prefecture: Chuxiong Yi Autonomous Prefecture
- County: Wuding County
- Time zone: UTC+8 (China Standard)

Bailu (simplified Chinese: 白路; traditional Chinese: 百祿; pinyin: Bǎilù) is a town under the administration of Wuding County, Yunnan, China. As of 2018, it has 10 villages under its administration.
