= Lope language =

Loloish language spoken in China

Lope
- Awu
- Pronunciation: [lo̠˨˩˦pʰɯ̠˨˩]
- Native to: China
- Region: Yunnan
- Native speakers: 20,000 (2002)
- Language family: Sino-Tibetan: Tibeto-Burman; Lolo–Burmese; Loloish; Nisoish; Southeastern Loloish; Lope

Language codes
- ISO 639-3: yiu
- Glottolog: awuu1235

Awu (Chinese: 阿务), also known as Lope (autonym: lo214 pʰɯ21), is a Loloish language of China. Awu is spoken in Luxi, Mile, Luoping, and Shizong counties (Ethnologue). It is closely related to Nisu (Lama 2012).

Northern Awu is a distinct language. Ethnologue lists Northern Awu and Southern Awu as dialects.

YYFC (1983) documents Awu (阿乌) as spoken in Jieyupo, Shemu Village, Dongshan Township (东山公社舍木大队捷雨坡村), Mile County, Yunnan.
