= Pollard script =

Abugida used in China

Pollard Pollard Miao, 𖽃𖽔𖾐 𖽑𖼄𖽻𖾐 (A-Hmao, Miao)
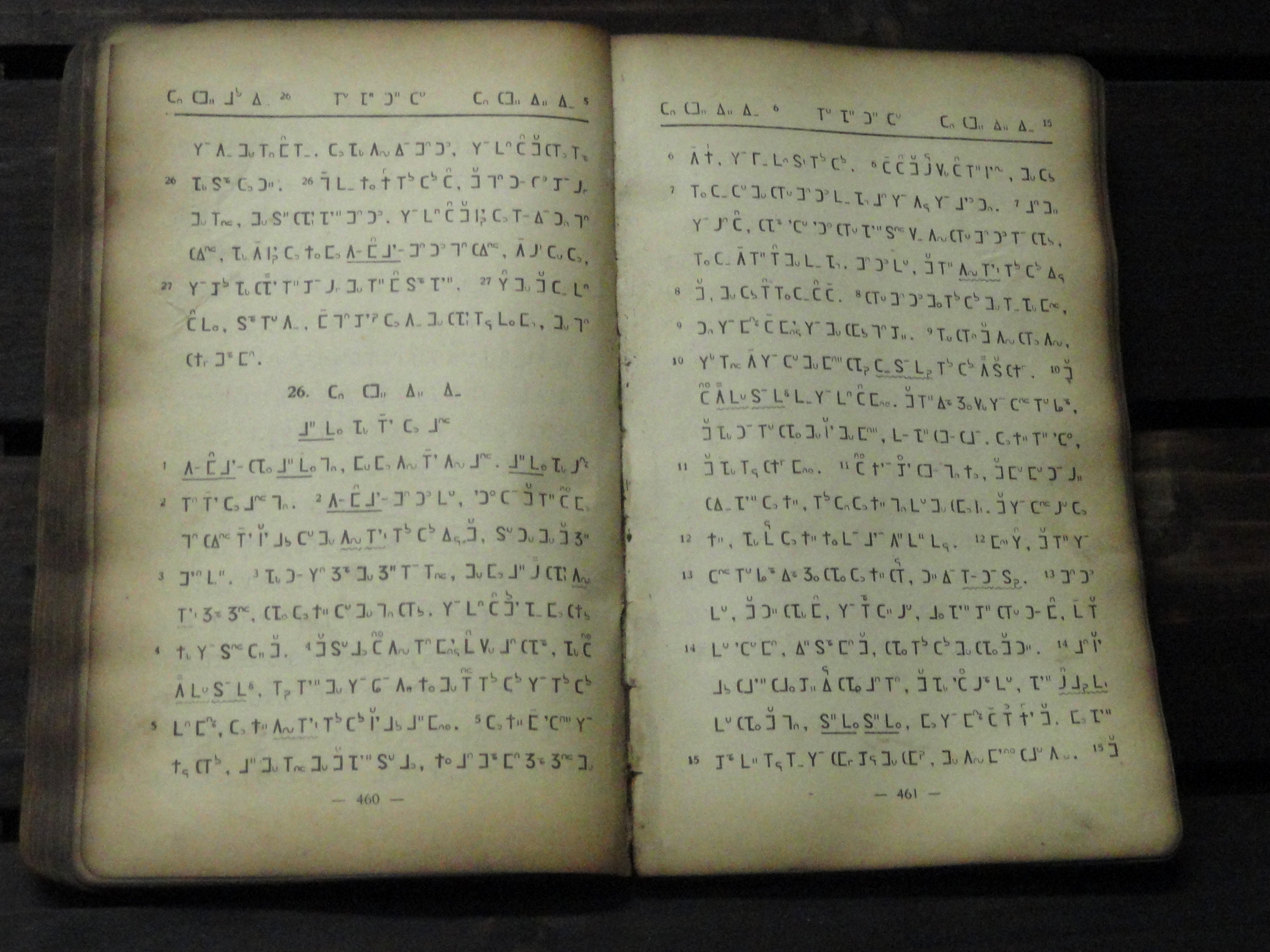
- Miao book in Pollard script, in the Yunnan Nationalities Museum, Kunming, Yunnan, China.
- Script type: Abugida
- Creator: Sam Pollard
- Period: ca. 1936 to the present
- Direction: Left-to-right
- Languages: A-Hmao, Lipo, Sichuan Miao, Nasu

Related scripts
- Parent systems: Canadian Aboriginal syllabics: Pollard Pollard Miao, 𖽃𖽔𖾐 𖽑𖼄𖽻𖾐 (A-Hmao, Miao)

ISO 15924
- ISO 15924: Plrd (282), Miao (Pollard)

Unicode
- Unicode alias: Miao
- Unicode range: U+16F00–U+16F9F

The Pollard script, also known as Pollard Miao (Chinese: 柏格理苗文; pinyin: Bó Gélǐ Miáo-wén) or Miao, is an abugida loosely based on the Latin alphabet and invented by Methodist missionary Sam Pollard. Pollard invented the script for use with A-Hmao, one of several Miao languages spoken in China. The script underwent a series of revisions until 1936, when a translation of the New Testament was published using it.

Pollard credited the basic idea of the script to the Cree syllabics designed by James Evans in 1838–1841: "While working out the problem, we remembered the case of the syllabics used by a Methodist missionary among the Indians of North America, and resolved to do as he had done." He also gave credit to a Chinese pastor: "Stephen Lee assisted me very ably in this matter, and at last we arrived at a system."

The introduction of Christian materials in the script that Pollard invented had a great impact among the Miao people. Part of the reason was that they had a legend about how their ancestors had possessed a script but lost it. According to the legend, the script would be brought back some day. When the script was introduced, many Miao came from far away to see and learn it. Changing politics in China led to the use of several competing scripts, most of which were romanizations. The Pollard script remains popular among Hmong people in China, although Hmong outside China tend to use one of the alternative scripts. A revision of the script was completed in 1988, which remains in use.

As with most other abugidas, the Pollard letters represent consonants, whereas vowels are indicated by diacritics. Uniquely, however, the position of this diacritic is varied to represent tone. For example, in Western Hmong, placing the vowel diacritic above the consonant letter indicates that the syllable has a high tone, whereas placing it at the bottom right indicates a low tone.

== Characters ==
The script was originally developed for A-Hmao, and adopted early for Lipo. In 1949 Pollard adapted it for a group of Miao in Szechuan, creating a distinct alphabet. There is also a Nasu alphabet using Pollard script.

=== Consonants ===
𖼀	𖼁	𖼂	𖼃	𖼄
PA	BA	YI PA	PLA	MA
𖼅	𖼆	𖼇	𖼈	𖼉
MHA	ARCHAIC MA	FA	VA	VFA
𖼊	𖼋	𖼌	𖼍	𖼎
TA	DA	YI TTA	YI TA	TTA
𖼏	𖼐	𖼑	𖼒	𖼓
DDA	NA	NHA	YI NNA	ARCHAIC NA
𖼔	𖼕	𖼖	𖼗	𖼘
NNA	NNHA	LA	LYA	LHA
𖼙	𖼚	𖼛	𖼜	𖼝
LHYA	TLHA	DLHA	TLHYA	DLHYA
𖼞	𖼟	𖼠	𖼡	𖼢
KA	GA	YI KA	QA	QGA
𖼣	𖼤	𖼥	𖼦	𖼧
NGA	NGHA	ARCHAIC NGA	HA	XA
𖼨	𖼩	𖼪	𖼫	𖼬
GHA	GHHA	TSSA	DZZA	NYA
𖼭	𖼮	𖼯	𖼰	𖼱
NYHA	TSHA	DZHA	YI TSHA	YI DZHA
𖼲	𖼳	𖼴	𖼵	𖼶
REFORMED TSHA	SHA	SSA	ZHA	ZSHA
𖼷	𖼸	𖼹	𖼺	𖼻
TSA	DZA	YI TSA	SA	ZA
𖼼	𖼽	𖼾	𖼿	𖽀
ZSA	ZZA	ZZSA	ZZA	ZZYA
𖽁	𖽂	𖽃	𖽄	𖽅
ZZSYA	WA	AH	HHA	BRI
𖽆	𖽇	𖽈	𖽉	𖽊
SYI	DZYI	TE	TSE	RTE

=== Vowels and finals ===
𖽔	𖽕	𖽖	𖽗
A	AA	AHH	AN
𖽘	𖽙	𖽚	𖽛
ANG	O	OO	WO
𖽜	𖽝	𖽞	𖽟
W	E	EN	ENG
𖽠	𖽡	𖽢	𖽣
OEY	I	IA	IAN
𖽤	𖽥	𖽦	𖽧
IANG	IO	IE	II
𖽨	𖽩	𖽪	𖽫
IU	ING	U	UA
𖽬	𖽭	𖽮	𖽯
UAN	UANG	UU	UEI
𖽰	𖽱	𖽲	𖽳
UNG	Y	YI	AE
𖽴	𖽵	𖽶	𖽷
AEE	ERR	ROUNDED ERR	ER
𖽸	𖽹	𖽺	𖽻
ROUNDED ER	AI	EI	AU
𖽼	𖽽	𖽾	𖽿
OU	N	NG	UOG
𖾀	𖾁	𖾂	𖾃
YUI	OG	OER	VW
𖾄	𖾅	𖾆	𖾇
IG	EA	IONG	UI

=== Positioning tone marks ===
𖾏	𖾐	𖾑	𖾒
RIGHT	TOP RIGHT	ABOVE	BELOW

=== Baseline tone marks ===
𖾓	𖾔	𖾕	𖾖	𖾗	𖾘	𖾙
TONE-2	TONE-3	TONE-4	TONE-5	TONE-6	TONE-7	TONE-8

=== Archaic baseline tone marks ===
𖾚	𖾛	𖾜	𖾝	𖾞	𖾟
REFORMED TONE-1	REFORMED TONE-2	REFORMED TONE-4	REFORMED TONE-5	REFORMED TONE-6	REFORMED TONE-8

== Unicode ==
The Pollard script was first proposed for inclusion in Unicode by John Jenkins in 1997. It took many years to reach a final proposal in 2010.

It was added to the Unicode Standard in January, 2012 with the release of version 6.1.

The Unicode block for Pollard script, called Miao, is U+16F00–U+16F9F:

Miao^{[1]}^{[2]} Official Unicode Consortium code chart (PDF)
	0	1	2	3	4	5	6	7	8	9	A	B	C	D	E	F
U+16F0x	𖼀	𖼁	𖼂	𖼃	𖼄	𖼅	𖼆	𖼇	𖼈	𖼉	𖼊	𖼋	𖼌	𖼍	𖼎	𖼏
U+16F1x	𖼐	𖼑	𖼒	𖼓	𖼔	𖼕	𖼖	𖼗	𖼘	𖼙	𖼚	𖼛	𖼜	𖼝	𖼞	𖼟
U+16F2x	𖼠	𖼡	𖼢	𖼣	𖼤	𖼥	𖼦	𖼧	𖼨	𖼩	𖼪	𖼫	𖼬	𖼭	𖼮	𖼯
U+16F3x	𖼰	𖼱	𖼲	𖼳	𖼴	𖼵	𖼶	𖼷	𖼸	𖼹	𖼺	𖼻	𖼼	𖼽	𖼾	𖼿
U+16F4x	𖽀	𖽁	𖽂	𖽃	𖽄	𖽅	𖽆	𖽇	𖽈	𖽉	𖽊					𖽏
U+16F5x	𖽐	𖽑	𖽒	𖽓	𖽔	𖽕	𖽖	𖽗	𖽘	𖽙	𖽚	𖽛	𖽜	𖽝	𖽞	𖽟
U+16F6x	𖽠	𖽡	𖽢	𖽣	𖽤	𖽥	𖽦	𖽧	𖽨	𖽩	𖽪	𖽫	𖽬	𖽭	𖽮	𖽯
U+16F7x	𖽰	𖽱	𖽲	𖽳	𖽴	𖽵	𖽶	𖽷	𖽸	𖽹	𖽺	𖽻	𖽼	𖽽	𖽾	𖽿
U+16F8x	𖾀	𖾁	𖾂	𖾃	𖾄	𖾅	𖾆	𖾇								𖾏
U+16F9x	𖾐	𖾑	𖾒	𖾓	𖾔	𖾕	𖾖	𖾗	𖾘	𖾙	𖾚	𖾛	𖾜	𖾝	𖾞	𖾟
Notes: 1. As of Unicode version 17.0; 2. Grey areas indicate non-assigned code points

== Published sources ==
- Enwall, Joakim (1994). A Myth Become Reality: History and Development of the Miao Written Language, two volumes. Stockholm East Asian Monographs, 5 & 6. Stockholm: Institute of Oriental Languages, Stockholm University. ISBN 9789171534231.
- Pollard, Samuel (December 1909). "Gathering up the Fragments". The United Methodist Magazine. 2: 531–35.
- Wen You (1938). "Lun Pollard Script" 論 Pollard Script [Essay on the Pollard Script]. Xinan Bianjiang 西南邊疆 [Southwest frontier region]. 1: 43–53.
- Wen You (1951). "Guizhou Leishan xin chu Miaowen canshi chukao" 貴州雷山新出苗文殘石初考 [Preliminary investigation of the Miao writing fragments recently discovered in Leishan, Guizhou]. Huaxi Wenwu 華西文物 [Huaxi University cultural relics]. Reprinted in Wen You (1985). Wen You lunji 聞宥論集 [Collection of articles by Wen You]. Beijing: Zhongyang minzu xueyuan keyanchu 中央民族學院科研處 [Scientific research office of the Central Institute for Nationalities]. pp. 62–70.
