= Nisu language =

Loloish language cluster spoken in China

Nisu
- Southern Yi
- Native name written in classical Yi script
- Native to: China
- Ethnicity: Yi
- Native speakers: 300,000 apart from Northern (2004–2007); 160,000 Northern (no date)
- Language family: Sino-Tibetan: Tibeto-Burman; Lolo-Burmese; Loloish; Nisoish; Northern Loloish or Southeastern Loloish?; Nisu
- Writing system: Yi logograms

Language codes
- ISO 639-3: Variously: nsd – Southern yiv – Northern nos – Eastern nsv – Southwestern (duplicate or spurious code) nsf – Northwestern
- Glottolog: nisu1237 Nisu–Nyisu

Nisu (Southern Yi, Classical Yi script: ) is a language cluster spoken by half a million Yi people of China. It is one of six Yi languages recognized by the government of China. The Yi script was traditionally used, though few can still read it. According to Lama (2012), Nisu (Nishu) autonyms include ne̠33 su55, ne̠33 su55 pʰo21, and ɲe̠33 ʂu55.

The position of Nisu within Nisoish is debated. Nisu is classified as Southeastern Loloish by Pelkey (2011), but is traditionally classified as a Northern Loloish language, including by Lama (2012).

== Internal classification ==
=== Chen et al. (1985) ===
Chen et al. (1985:114) recognizes three major varieties of Southern Yi (i.e., Nisu) spoken in Yunnan province: Shijian (石建; Shiping-Jianshui), Yuanjin (元金; Yuanjiang-Jinping), and Exin (峨新; Eshan-Xinping). Autonyms include na̠33 su55 and na̠33 su55 pho21 (alternatively ne̠33 su55 pho21). Chen (1985) reported a speaker population of nearly 1.6 million.

- Shijian 石建土语: spoken in Shiping, Jianshui, Tonghai, Gejiu, Kaiyuan, Mengzi, and Hekou counties
- Yuanjin 元金土语: spoken in Yuanyang, Jinping, Mojiang, Yuanjiang, Pu'er, Jiangcheng, and Honghe counties
- Exin 峨新土语: spoken in Eshan, Xinping, Jiangchuan, Yuxi, Yimen, and Kunming counties

=== Yang (2009) ===
Yang (2009) classifies the Nisu dialects as follows.

- Northern Nisu
  - North-central (Shijian 石建): spoken in Shiping, Xinping, Jiangcheng, Mojiang, and Lüchun counties
  - Northwestern (Exin 峨新): spoken in Eshan and Jinning counties
- Southern Nisu (Yuanjin 元金): spoken in Honghe, Yuanyang, Jinping, Yuanjiang, Shiping, and perhaps also Jianshui counties
- Far Northwestern Nisu: spoken in Beidou Township (北斗彝族乡), Yongping County (descendants of Nisu soldiers who migrated to Yongping during the early Ming Dynasty; most divergent Nisu variety)

The Jiangcheng, Mojiang, and Lüchun varieties were grouped by Chen (1985) to be southern varieties, but Yang (2009) found that they actually belonged to the Northern Nisu group.

=== Other varieties ===
Other Nisu or Southern Yi groups with similar autonyms or language varieties are:

- Ache 阿车: Autonym in Xinping County (population 100+ as of 1955) is nei˧su˧ pʰɯ˨˩.
- Luowu 罗武 (300+ people in Xinping County (1955); 100 households in Shuangbai County; also in Zhenyuan County): ni33 su33 pʰo33
- Achang 阿常 of Niukong 牛孔, Lüchun County
- Pulian 普连 of Qimaba 骑马坝, Daxing 大兴, and Gekui 戈奎, Lüchun County
- Alu 阿鲁 of Dashuigou 大水沟, Lüchun County

A variety of Southern Nisu (autonym: ɲe33 su55 pʰo21) spoken in Aka Luoduo (阿卡洛多) village (also called Taiping village; 太平村), Tianfang Village (田房村), Jiangcheng County is covered in Lu Yan (2008).

In Tonghai County, Southern Yi (Nisu) is spoken by all generations only in Xiangping (象平), Bajiao (芭蕉), Sizhai (四寨), Shikan (石坎), Pingba (平坝), Shangzhuangke (上庄科), and Xiazhuangke (下庄科) villages.

== Lexicography ==
Pu wrote a Nisu-Chinese dictionary in 2021, with Nisu words transcribed in both IPA and Yi script. It is based on the Nisu dialect of Renhou Village 仁厚村 and Yongning Village 永宁村, both of which are located several kilometers north of Mengzi City, Yunnan. This dictionary uses the Yunnan Standard Yi script rather than the Classical Yi script or the Modern(Liangshan) Yi script.

== Phonology ==
=== Consonants ===
		Labial	Alveolar		(Alveolo-) palatal	Retroflex	Velar	Glottal
		Labial	plain	sibilant	(Alveolo-) palatal	Retroflex	Velar	Glottal
Nasal		m	n		ȵ		ŋ	
Stop/ Affricate	voiceless	p	t	t͡s	t͡ɕ	t͡ʂ	k	ʔ
Stop/ Affricate	aspirated	pʰ	tʰ	t͡sʰ	t͡ɕʰ	t͡ʂʰ	kʰ	
Stop/ Affricate	voiced	b	d	d͡z	d͡ʑ	d͡ʐ	ɡ	
Fricative	voiceless	f	s		ɕ	ʂ	x	
Fricative	voiced	v	z		ʑ	ʐ	ɣ	
Fricative	lateral		ɬ					
Lateral			l					

=== Vowels ===
There is distinction between tight-throat vowels and lax-throat (plain) vowels.

	Front		Central		Back			
	unrd.	tight	unrd.	tight	unrd.	rnd.	tight	
Close	i	i̱			ɯ	u	ɯ̱	u̱
Mid	e	e̱	(ə˞)	(ə̱˞)	ɤ	o	ɤ̱	o̱
Open-mid	(ɛ)	(ɛ̱)						
Open			a	a̱				

- Diphthongs /iɛ, i̱ɛ̱/ occur with alveolo-palatal consonants /t͡ɕ, t͡ɕʰ, d͡ʑ, ɕ, ʑ/ in complementary distribution, in the Laochang dialect.
- Open-mid sounds /ɛ, ɛ̱/ only occur in the Shaochong dialect.
- Rhotic vowels /ə˞, ə̱˞/ occur mainly in the Northwestern dialects.
- Sounds /i, i̱/ are heard as syllabic consonants [z̩, ẕ̩] when following alveolar sibilants or affricates, and as syllabic retroflex [ʐ̩, ʐ̱̩] when following retroflex ones.

=== Tones ===
3 tones occur as follows:

Name	Pitch	Symbol
Low (falling)	21	˨˩
Mid	33	˧
High	55	˦
