= Nasu people =

Nasu
Total population
- c. 1,100,000

Regions with significant populations
- China, Yunnan and Sichuan provinces

Languages
- Nasu

Religion
- Indigenous

The Nasu people (Chinese: 纳苏; pinyin: Nàsū) are an ethnic group in the People's Republic of China. They are a subgroup of the Yi people and are mainly distinguished by their use of the Nasu language, one of five main branches of the Yi languages.

They are divided into the Eastern Nasu with more than 400,000 persons in Luquan Yi and Miao Autonomous County, the Jinghong Nasu with more than 20,000, the Panxian Nasu with more than 300,000 in Panzhou, the Southern Nasu with more than 100,000, and the Wusa Nasu. They are from Yunnan and Sichuan. They are classified as part of the Yi people. The Nasu language (Eastern Yi) is one of the Lolo–Burmese languages belonging to the Tibeto-Burman languages.

Most of the Yi people of the Luquan area do not have the autonym Luoluo and Nasu in the local dialect of Yi language means "black", hence the Black Yi (Chinese 黑彝 Hei Yi). However, the terms Black Yi (aristocrats) and White Yi (peasants) are properly caste distinctions, not linguistic ones.

== See also ==
- Nasu language
