= Shizong County =

Coordinates: 24°49′41″N 103°59′24″E

Shizong County 师宗县
- County
- Location of Shizong County (red) and Qujing City (pink) within Yunnan
- Country: People's Republic of China
- Province: Yunnan
- Prefecture-level city: Qujing

Area
  - Total: 2,096 km^{2} (809 sq mi)

Population
  - Total: 333,621
  - Density: 159.2/km^{2} (412.2/sq mi)
- Time zone: UTC+8 (CST)
- Postal code: 655700
- Area code: 0874
- Website: www.ynsz.gov.cn

Shizong County (simplified Chinese: 师宗县; traditional Chinese: 師宗縣; pinyin: Shīzōng Xiàn) is under the administration of the prefecture-level city of Qujing, in the southeast of Yunnan province, China. It borders Luoping County to the east, Xilin County of Guangxi to the southeast, Qiubei County to the south, Luxi County, Yunnan to the southwest and Luliang County to the north.

== Ethnic groups ==
The Landian Yao (蓝靛瑶) people of Gaoliang Township (高良壮族苗族瑶族乡) are found in Xin'an (新安), Dinglei (丁累), Xidu (细独), Shanglongga (上笼戛), and Xialongga (下笼戛) villages.

== Administrative divisions ==
Shizong County has 3 subdistricts, 4 towns and 3 ethnic townships.

3 subdistricts

- Danfeng (丹凤街道)
- Yangyue (漾月街道)
- Datong (大同街道)

4 towns

- Xiongbi (雄壁镇)
- Kuishan (葵山镇)
- Caiyun (彩云镇)
- Zhuji (竹基镇)

3 ethnic townships

- Longqing Yi and Zhuang (龙庆彝族壮族乡)
- Wulong Zhuang (五龙壮族乡)
- Gaoliang Zhuang Miao and Yao (高良壮族苗族瑶族乡)

== Climate ==
Climate data for Shizong, elevation 1,901 m (6,237 ft), (1991–2020 normals, extremes 1981–2010)
Month	Jan	Feb	Mar	Apr	May	Jun	Jul	Aug	Sep	Oct	Nov	Dec	Year
Record high °C (°F)	23.5 (74.3)	26.8 (80.2)	28.7 (83.7)	31.4 (88.5)	32.3 (90.1)	30.8 (87.4)	31.0 (87.8)	29.2 (84.6)	29.0 (84.2)	26.9 (80.4)	25.7 (78.3)	24.2 (75.6)	32.3 (90.1)
Mean daily maximum °C (°F)	13.4 (56.1)	16.0 (60.8)	20.3 (68.5)	23.4 (74.1)	24.5 (76.1)	24.5 (76.1)	24.2 (75.6)	24.2 (75.6)	22.5 (72.5)	19.5 (67.1)	17.1 (62.8)	13.5 (56.3)	20.3 (68.5)
Daily mean °C (°F)	6.9 (44.4)	9.1 (48.4)	12.9 (55.2)	16.3 (61.3)	18.5 (65.3)	19.7 (67.5)	19.7 (67.5)	19.2 (66.6)	17.5 (63.5)	14.7 (58.5)	11.1 (52.0)	7.5 (45.5)	14.4 (58.0)
Mean daily minimum °C (°F)	2.8 (37.0)	4.5 (40.1)	7.7 (45.9)	11.1 (52.0)	14.1 (57.4)	16.6 (61.9)	16.9 (62.4)	16.2 (61.2)	14.4 (57.9)	11.8 (53.2)	7.2 (45.0)	3.6 (38.5)	10.6 (51.0)
Record low °C (°F)	−5.4 (22.3)	−5.0 (23.0)	−4.9 (23.2)	0.3 (32.5)	1.3 (34.3)	7.9 (46.2)	10.8 (51.4)	9.5 (49.1)	4.1 (39.4)	0.9 (33.6)	−5.5 (22.1)	−15.0 (5.0)	−15.0 (5.0)
Average precipitation mm (inches)	28.5 (1.12)	21.6 (0.85)	29.4 (1.16)	37.6 (1.48)	120.4 (4.74)	237.7 (9.36)	227.8 (8.97)	179.1 (7.05)	113.1 (4.45)	82.5 (3.25)	31.2 (1.23)	20.9 (0.82)	1,129.8 (44.48)
Average precipitation days (≥ 0.1 mm)	10.4	9.0	9.2	9.1	13.4	18.0	20.5	20.0	14.9	15.1	8.7	9.1	157.4
Average snowy days	2.5	1.2	0.3	0	0	0	0	0	0	0	0.1	0.7	4.8
Average relative humidity (%)	79	72	67	67	73	82	85	85	85	86	82	82	79
Mean monthly sunshine hours	149.6	164.2	200.5	207.6	180.5	124.9	119.2	128.6	108.2	105.1	145.3	134.2	1,767.9
Percentage possible sunshine	45	51	54	54	44	31	29	32	30	30	45	41	41
Source: China Meteorological Administration
