= Fumin County =

Coordinates: 25°17′18″N 102°29′06″E

Fumin County 富民县
- County
- Location of Fumin County (red) and Kunming City (pink) within Yunnan province
- Country: People's Republic of China
- Province: Yunnan
- Prefecture-level city: Kunming
- Established: 1956

Area
  - Total: 993 km^{2} (383 sq mi)

Population (2020)
  - Total: 149,506
  - Density: 151/km^{2} (390/sq mi)
- Postal code: 650400
- Area code: 0871
- Website: http://www.ynfumin.net/

Fumin County (Chinese: 富民县; pinyin: Fùmín Xiàn) is a county, under the jurisdiction of Kunming, Yunnan, China. It borders Panlong District, Wuhua District, Songming County and Xundian County to the east, Luquan County to the north, Lufeng City and Wuding County to the west, and Xishan District to the south. It is in the west of Kunming.

== Administrative divisions ==
Yongding Town and Daying Town, Luomian Yi Nationality and Miao Nationality Village, Sandan Village, Kuanzhuang Village, Dongcun Village and Chijiu Village

== History ==
In February 2007, Fumin County gained national notoriety when the local authority painted the side of a mountain green in order to "change the feng shui" of the area.

== Ethnic groups ==
The Yi people of Fumin County are divided into the following subgroups (Fumin County Gazetteer, p. 83). Locations are listed for each subgroup.

- Black Yi 黑彝 (23 villages, 968 households, 4,842 persons)
  - Yongding Town 永定镇: Qinghezhong Village 清河中村, Panjiafen 潘家坟, Lannitian 烂泥田
  - Daying Town 大营镇: Mailongqing 麦竜箐, Maiyidian 麦依甸
  - Luomian Township 罗免乡: Danuozhi 大糯支, Xiaonuozhi 小糯支, Shibangou 石板沟, Xihe 西核
  - Chijiu Township 赤鹫乡: Gankulou 干枯楼, Donghe 东核, Puheini 普黑泥, Jumili 咀咪哩, Pingdi 平地
  - Kuanzhuang Township 款庄乡: Shanglongtan 上龙潭, Xinmin 新民, Qingping 淸平, Xiaocun 小村, Luchaku 鲁岔库, Heping 和平, Fang'erge 放耳戈, Tuozhuo 拖卓, Mopade 莫怕得
  - Dongcun Township 东村乡: Longtan 龙潭
- Micha 密岔 (5 villages, 290 households, 1,484 persons)
  - Chijiu Township 赤鹫乡: Longtan Village 龙潭村
  - Luomian Township 罗免乡: Shangmadi 上麻地, Xiamadi 下麻地, Shaoshang 哨上, Damaka 打马卡
- White Yi 白彝 (12 villages, 441 households, 1,941 persons)
  - Yongding Town 永定镇: Wayao 瓦窑, Wujiaying 五家营, Xizhuang 西庄, Dashiba 大石坝, Chewan 车完, Zhuangzi 庄子, Shikantian 石坎田, Lijiacun 李家村, Qingshuihe 清水河, Shangcun 上村, Shiwopu 石窝铺
  - Luomian Township 罗免乡: Zehei 则黑
  - Qinlao Township 勤劳乡: Qiaodong 橇东, Gulvqing 谷律箐, Liziyuan 栗子园 (Yi and Bai mixed villages)
- Yellow Yi 黄彝 (3 villages, 45 households, 205 persons; surnames An 安 and Chen 陈)
  - Luomian Township 罗免乡: Dayaoqing 大窑箐, Yutan 渔塘, Yanjiao 岩脚
- Dry Yi 干彝 (17 villages, 94 households, 447 persons)
  - Dongcun Township 东村乡: Wanbaoshan 万宝山, Shuanglongtan 双龙潭, Jiudiji 旧地基, Shigongji 石公鸡, Yangduoke 羊多棵, Changpuqing 菖蒲箐
  - Kuanzhuang Township 款庄乡: Baishiyan 白石岩

== Climate ==
Climate data for Fumin, elevation 1,693 m (5,554 ft), (1991–2020 normals, extremes 1981–2020)
Month	Jan	Feb	Mar	Apr	May	Jun	Jul	Aug	Sep	Oct	Nov	Dec	Year
Record high °C (°F)	25.7 (78.3)	29.1 (84.4)	31.2 (88.2)	32.7 (90.9)	34.4 (93.9)	35.2 (95.4)	33.0 (91.4)	34.1 (93.4)	32.0 (89.6)	29.5 (85.1)	27.4 (81.3)	25.2 (77.4)	35.2 (95.4)
Mean daily maximum °C (°F)	18.1 (64.6)	20.5 (68.9)	23.7 (74.7)	26.4 (79.5)	27.4 (81.3)	27.5 (81.5)	26.9 (80.4)	27.0 (80.6)	25.5 (77.9)	23.3 (73.9)	20.8 (69.4)	17.9 (64.2)	23.8 (74.7)
Daily mean °C (°F)	8.9 (48.0)	11.3 (52.3)	14.9 (58.8)	18.3 (64.9)	20.8 (69.4)	21.8 (71.2)	21.3 (70.3)	20.7 (69.3)	19.3 (66.7)	16.8 (62.2)	12.4 (54.3)	9.1 (48.4)	16.3 (61.3)
Mean daily minimum °C (°F)	2.0 (35.6)	3.8 (38.8)	7.2 (45.0)	11.0 (51.8)	15.3 (59.5)	17.9 (64.2)	17.9 (64.2)	17.0 (62.6)	15.6 (60.1)	12.8 (55.0)	6.9 (44.4)	3.1 (37.6)	10.9 (51.6)
Record low °C (°F)	−5.6 (21.9)	−3.7 (25.3)	−5.0 (23.0)	1.7 (35.1)	4.1 (39.4)	9.1 (48.4)	12.1 (53.8)	10.0 (50.0)	5.4 (41.7)	3.2 (37.8)	−2.8 (27.0)	−6.9 (19.6)	−6.9 (19.6)
Average precipitation mm (inches)	21.7 (0.85)	11.7 (0.46)	18.9 (0.74)	25.0 (0.98)	75.2 (2.96)	167.4 (6.59)	177.5 (6.99)	150.2 (5.91)	104.6 (4.12)	68.6 (2.70)	25.8 (1.02)	9.8 (0.39)	856.4 (33.71)
Average precipitation days (≥ 0.1 mm)	4.2	3.3	5.2	6.5	11.2	16.0	20.1	18.5	14.5	11.7	5.2	3.8	120.2
Average snowy days	0.4	0.2	0.2	0	0	0	0	0	0	0	0.1	0.2	1.1
Average relative humidity (%)	67	60	55	55	62	74	81	82	81	79	75	73	70
Mean monthly sunshine hours	221.0	225.3	253.7	254.1	214.5	141.0	110.1	128.8	111.4	140.3	184.6	191.8	2,176.6
Percentage possible sunshine	66	70	68	66	52	34	26	32	31	40	57	59	50
Source: China Meteorological Administration
