= Samu language =

Endangered Sino-Tibetan language spoken in China

Samu
- Samatao
- Native to: China
- Ethnicity: 2,810 (2007)
- Native speakers: 400 (2007)
- Language family: Sino-Tibetan: Tibeto-Burman; Lolo–Burmese; Loloish; Kazhuoish; Samu

Language codes
- ISO 639-3: ysd
- Glottolog: sama1295
- ELP: Samatao
- Samu language is classified as Critically Endangered by the UNESCO Atlas of the World's Languages in Danger.

The Samu (autonym: sa33 mu33; Chinese: 撒慕) language, or Samatao (sa33 ma21 taw21; Chinese 撒马多 Samaduo), also known as Eastern Samadu, is a Loloish language spoken by older adults in Zijun Village 子君村 (also called Da'er), Yiliu Township 矣六乡, Guandu District 官渡区, Kunming, China. Although there was an ethnic population of 2,465 in 1999, there are no fluent speakers under 50 years of age.
