= Luquan Yi and Miao Autonomous County =

Luquan County 禄劝县 · 𖼘𖽒𖽪𖾗 𖼪𖽑𖽱𖽗𖾙 𖼺𖽙
- Autonomous county
- 禄劝彝族苗族自治县 𖼘𖽒𖽪𖾗 𖼪𖽑𖽱𖽗𖾙 𖽃𖽔 𖼄𖽘𖾔 𖽃𖽔 𖼄𖽑𖽻𖾔 𖽀𖽒𖽧𖾕 𖼮𖽑𖽱𖾓 𖼺𖽙 Luquan Yi and Miao Autonomous County
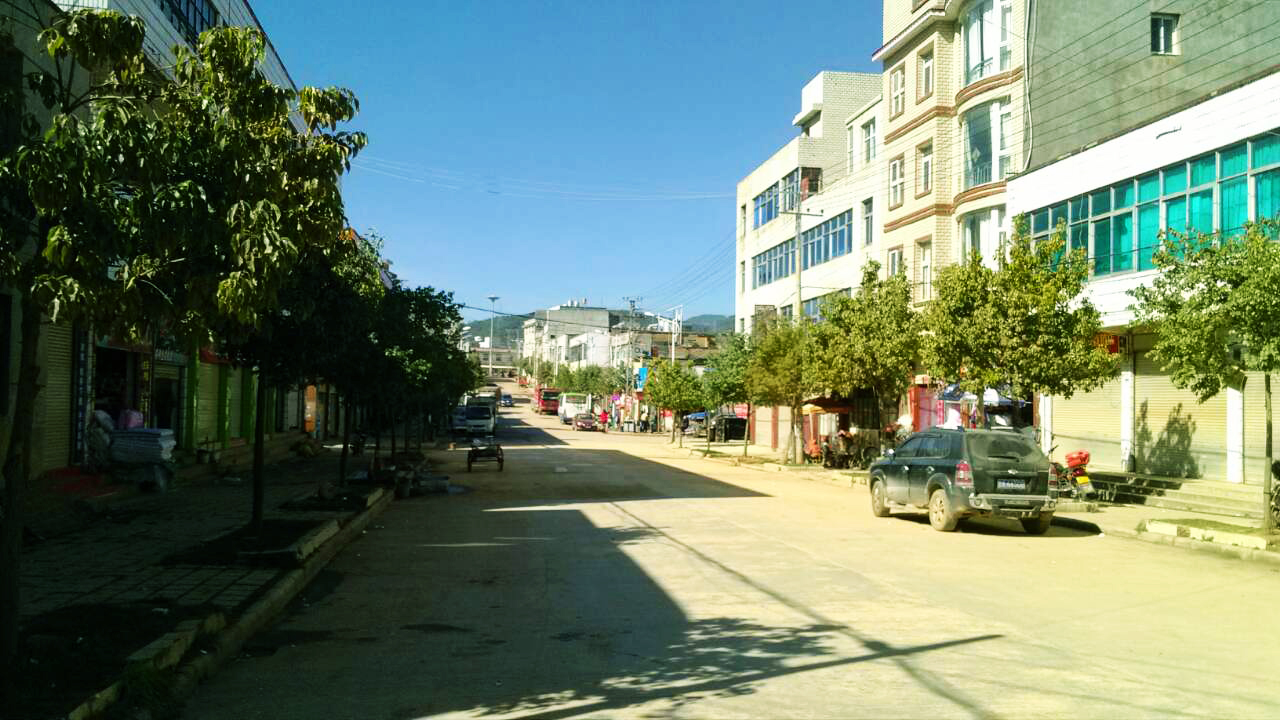

- Location of Luquan County (red) and Kunming City (pink) and Yunnan province

- Location within Yunnan Location within China
- Coordinates: 25°52′11″N 102°35′36″E
- Country: China
- Province: Yunnan
- Prefecture-level city: Kunming
- Established: 1956
- County seat: Pingshan Subdistrict

Area
  - Autonomous county: 4,378 km^{2} (1,690 sq mi)
- Highest elevation (Mazongling (马鬃岭)): 4,247 m (13,934 ft)
- Lowest elevation (Jinsha River): 746 m (2,448 ft)

Population (2020 census)
  - Autonomous county: 378,881
  - Density: 86.54/km^{2} (224.1/sq mi)
  - Urban: 154,828
  - Rural: 224,053
- Time zone: UTC+8 (CST)
- Postal code: 651500
- Area code: 0871
- Website: www.kmlq.gov.cn

Luquan Yi and Miao Autonomous County (Note: simplified Chinese: 禄劝彝族苗族自治县; traditional Chinese: 禄劝彝族苗族自治縣; pinyin: Lùquàn Yízú Miáozú Zìzhìxiàn; A-Hmao: 𖼘𖽒𖽪𖾗 𖼪𖽑𖽱𖽗𖾙 𖽃𖽔 𖼄𖽘𖾔 𖽃𖽔 𖼄𖽑𖽻𖾔 𖽀𖽒𖽧𖾕 𖼮𖽑𖽱𖾓 𖼺𖽙) is an autonomous county, under the jurisdiction of Kunming, Yunnan, China, bordering Sichuan province to the north. As of the 2020 census the population was 378,881.

The county seat has two bus stations. The first is the long-distance Kunming-Luquan bus station, near the access to the G108 highway. The second is the local public bus station behind the Wuxinglu street market, with buses north to Maoshan, Tuanjie, Zhongping and Sayingpan, south to Songde, east to Cuihua and west to Wuding County.

Luquan County borders Xundian County and Dongchuan District to the east, Fumin County to the south, Wuding County to the west, and Huili and Huidong County of Sichuan across the Jinsha River to the north.

== Economy ==
Luquan's agriculture is specialized in sericulture, chestnuts, white kidney beans, coffee, and tobacco.

== Administrative divisions ==
Name	Native name	Population (2020)
Luquan County	禄劝彝族苗族自治县	378,881
Pingshan Subdistrict	屏山街道	101,735
Chongde Subdistrict	崇德街道	27,749
Sayingpan Town	撒营盘镇	28,427
Zhuanlong Town	转龙镇	24,143
Maoshan Town	茂山镇	23,062
Tuanjie Town	团街镇	17,305
Zhongping Town	中屏镇	13,393
Jiaopingdu Town	皎平渡镇	14,342
Wudongde Town	乌东德镇	15,730
Cuihua Town	翠华镇	25,835
Jiulong Town	九龙镇	29,231
Yunlong Township	云龙乡	6,406
Tanglang Township	汤郎乡	9,804
Malutang Township	马鹿塘乡	10,093
Zehei Township	则黑乡	15,245
Wumeng Township	乌蒙乡	9,748
Xueshan Township	雪山乡	6,633

== Ethnic groups ==
29.95% of the population in 2020 belonged to ethnic minorities, mainly Yi and Miao.

There are 1,026 ethnic Hani as of 1990, who live in Xiaojing 硝井 and Liuhe 六合 of Chongde Township 崇德乡, and Xinglong 兴龙 and Chutu 初途 of Cuihua Township 翠华乡 (Luquan County Gazetteer 1995:150). The only Hani-speaking village is Liuhe 六合 of Chongde Township 崇德乡. Their autonym is Luomian 罗缅.

Sayingpan-zhen (撒营盘镇), 80 km (50 mi) north of the county seat of Luquan, was the original site of Salaowu (撒老乌), the headquarters of the Yi.

The Luquan County Gazetteer (1995:132) lists the following Yi subgroups.

- Nasu 纳苏 (Black Yi 黑彝)
- Aluo 阿罗 (Dry Yi 干彝 or White Yi 白彝)
- Gaopo 稿颇 (Dry Yi 干彝 or White Yi 白彝)
- Miqipo 密期颇 (Micha 密岔)
- Sanipo 撒尼颇 (Milang 密朗)
- Nuosu 诺苏 (Liangshan Yi 凉山彝)
- Lipo 里颇

== Climate ==
Climate data for Luquan, elevation 1,751 m (5,745 ft), (1991–2020 normals, extremes 1991–present)
Month	Jan	Feb	Mar	Apr	May	Jun	Jul	Aug	Sep	Oct	Nov	Dec	Year
Record high °C (°F)	25.3 (77.5)	29.6 (85.3)	30.4 (86.7)	32.9 (91.2)	34.6 (94.3)	35.2 (95.4)	32.7 (90.9)	33.9 (93.0)	31.9 (89.4)	28.9 (84.0)	28.3 (82.9)	23.9 (75.0)	35.2 (95.4)
Mean daily maximum °C (°F)	17.5 (63.5)	20.3 (68.5)	23.6 (74.5)	26.4 (79.5)	27.4 (81.3)	27.3 (81.1)	26.6 (79.9)	26.9 (80.4)	25.3 (77.5)	22.8 (73.0)	20.0 (68.0)	17.1 (62.8)	23.4 (74.2)
Daily mean °C (°F)	8.7 (47.7)	11.4 (52.5)	14.7 (58.5)	18.0 (64.4)	20.5 (68.9)	21.6 (70.9)	21.1 (70.0)	20.7 (69.3)	19.2 (66.6)	16.6 (61.9)	12.2 (54.0)	8.9 (48.0)	16.1 (61.1)
Mean daily minimum °C (°F)	2.1 (35.8)	3.9 (39.0)	7.0 (44.6)	10.5 (50.9)	14.7 (58.5)	17.7 (63.9)	17.9 (64.2)	17.1 (62.8)	15.8 (60.4)	13.0 (55.4)	7.1 (44.8)	3.3 (37.9)	10.8 (51.5)
Record low °C (°F)	−4.9 (23.2)	−2.9 (26.8)	−0.9 (30.4)	2.0 (35.6)	5.9 (42.6)	9.8 (49.6)	11.6 (52.9)	10.5 (50.9)	5.6 (42.1)	4.9 (40.8)	−2.2 (28.0)	−5.3 (22.5)	−5.3 (22.5)
Average precipitation mm (inches)	21.4 (0.84)	9.7 (0.38)	14.5 (0.57)	25.5 (1.00)	81.1 (3.19)	169.5 (6.67)	219.1 (8.63)	150.3 (5.92)	119.3 (4.70)	89.8 (3.54)	29.6 (1.17)	10.9 (0.43)	940.7 (37.04)
Average precipitation days (≥ 0.1 mm)	4.1	3.3	4.7	6.6	10.5	15.8	20.6	18.1	14.5	12.3	5.2	3.3	119
Average snowy days	0.6	0.3	0.2	0	0	0	0	0	0	0	0.1	0.2	1.4
Average relative humidity (%)	69	59	54	56	63	75	82	82	82	81	78	75	71
Mean monthly sunshine hours	202.8	207.4	225.4	214.8	191.6	133.7	109.1	132.0	112.6	132.7	171.7	172.0	2,005.8
Percentage possible sunshine	61	65	60	56	46	33	26	33	31	37	53	53	46
Source: China Meteorological Administrationall-time November record high
