= Nasu language =

Sino-Tibetan language spoken in China

Nasu
- Eastern Yi
- 𖼐𖽨𖾑 𖼺𖽪𖾐
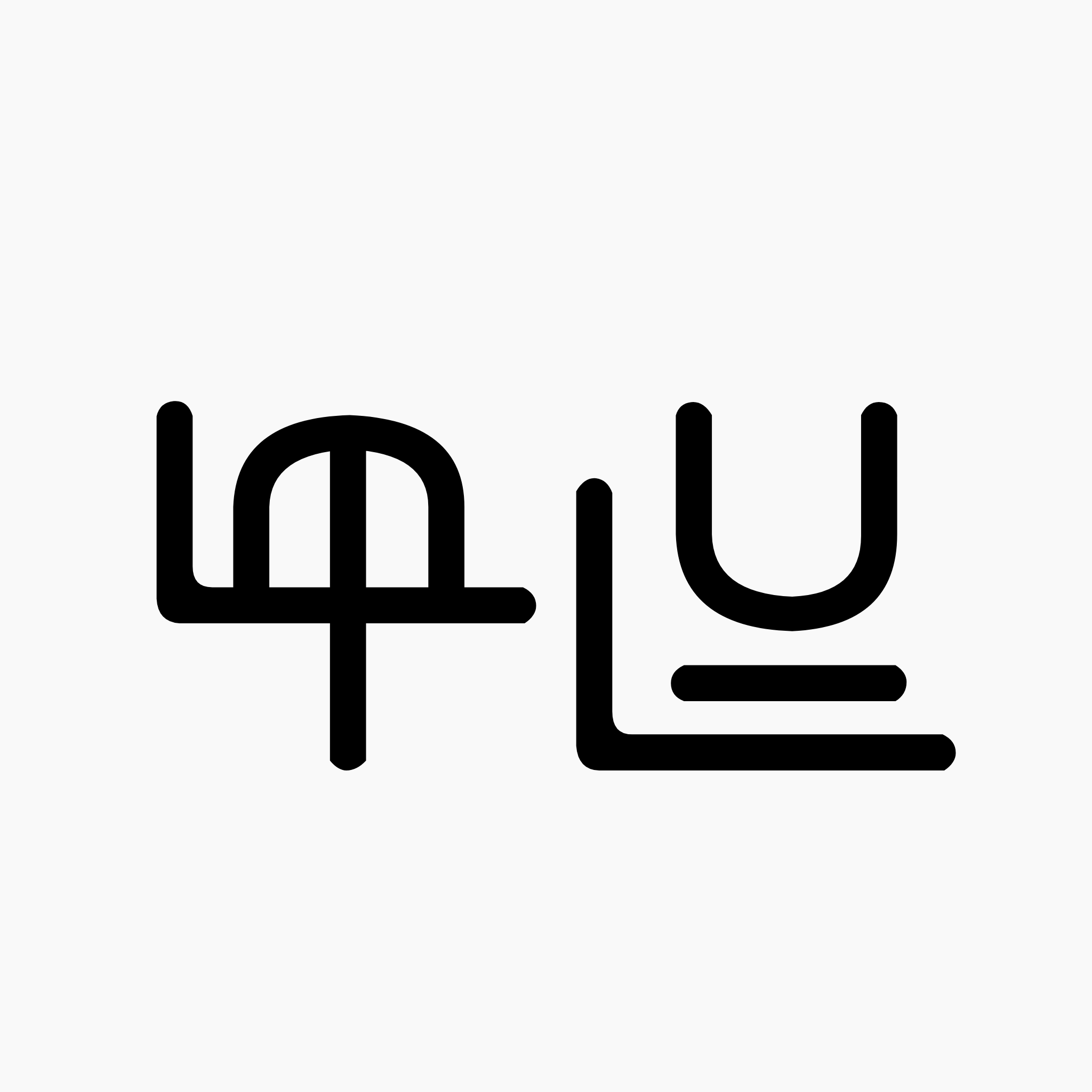
- Nasu Yi script
- Native to: China
- Ethnicity: Nasu (Yi)
- Native speakers: 1.0 million (2007)
- Language family: Sino-Tibetan: Tibeto-Burman; Lolo-Burmese; Loloish; Nisoish; Northern Loloish; Nasoid; Nasu
- Writing system: Pollard script, Yi script

Language codes
- ISO 639-3: Variously: ywq – Nasu (Wulu) ygp – Gepo (Köpu) yig – Wusa Nasu ywu – Wumeng Nasu
- Glottolog: wudi1238 Wuding-Luquan Yi = Wulu gepo1234 Gepo nesu1235 Nesu = Wusa–Wumeng
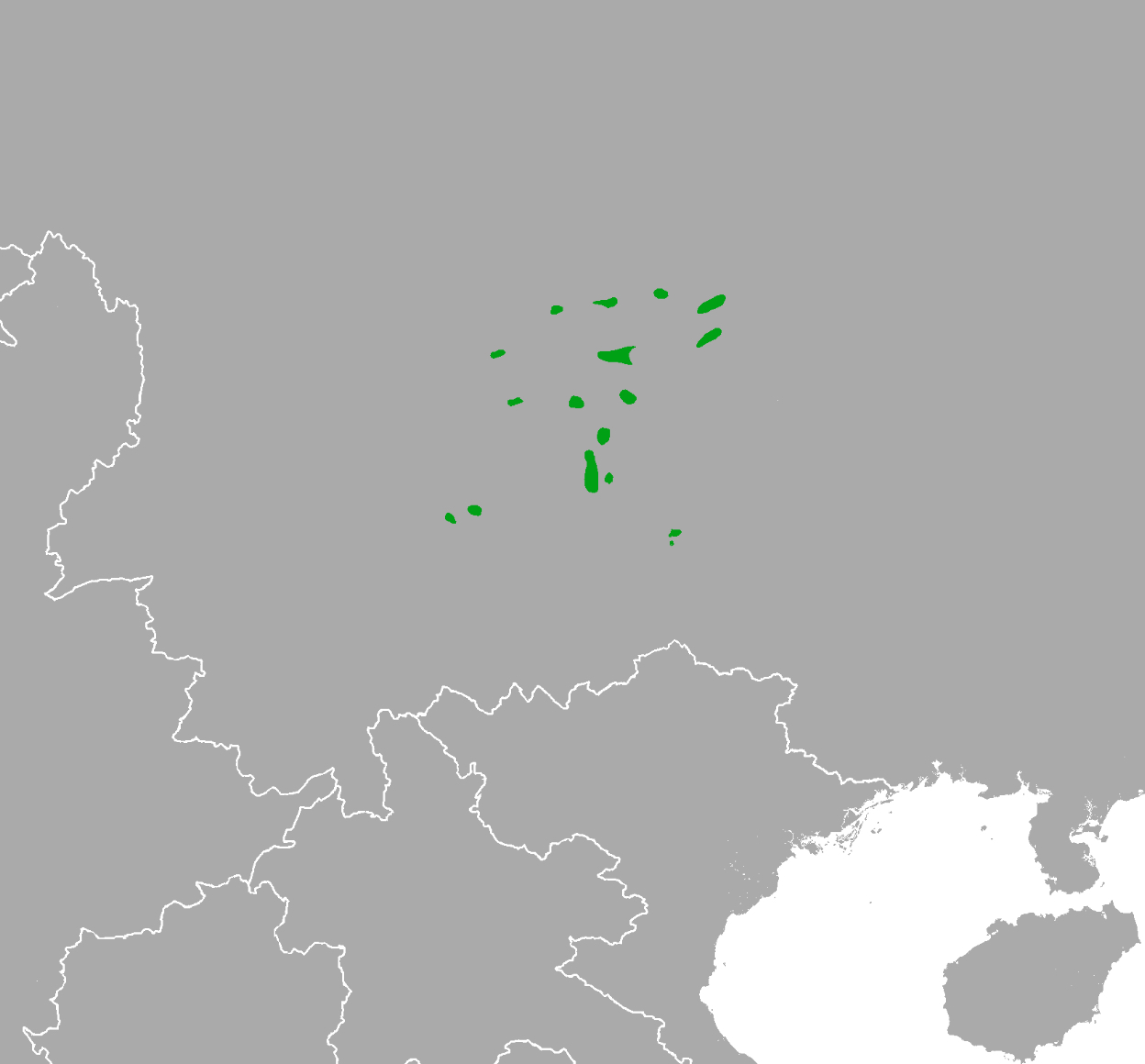

The Nasu language, also known as the Eastern Yi language, is a Loloish language spoken by the Yi people of China. Nasu and Wusa are two of six Yi languages recognized by the Government of China. Unlike most written Yi languages, Nasu uses the Pollard script. A distinct form of the Yi script was traditionally used for Wusa, though few can still read it.

The Nasu language is also known as the Black Yi language, but this name is no longer used.

== Names ==
According to the Guizhou Ethnic Gazetteer (2002), Yi autonyms include Nasu 哪苏, Tusu 兔苏, Lagou 腊勾, Guo 果, and so forth.

Most of Yi people of the Luquan area do not have the autonym Luoluo and Nasu (transliterated into Chinese as 纳苏) means "black", hence the Black Yi (黑彝 Hei Yi), though Black Yi is an aristocratic caste distinction among the Yi People, and Black Yi Script (Heiyiwen) was a Latin script for Yi introduced by missionaries.

== Classification ==
=== Chen (1985) ===
Chen, et al. (1985:108) recognizes 3 major varieties of Eastern Yi (i.e., Nasu) that are spoken in Yunnan and Guizhou provinces, namely Dianqian 滇黔 (Yunnan-Guizhou), Pan 盘县 (Pan County of Guizhou), and Diandongbei 滇东北 (Northeastern Yunnan). Autonyms include no55su55 (alternatively nɤ55su13), na33su33 pʰo55 (including na33so33 pʰo55, nɤ55su33 pʰu55, and ni55su33 pʰu55), nɒ55 pʰo55, and ko33 pʰo55.

- Dianqian 滇黔次方言: 4 dialects
  - Shuixi 水西土语: spoken in Bijie, Qianxi, Dafang, Zhijin, Nayong, Qingzhen, and Zhenxiong counties
  - Wusa 乌撒土语 (Yang Zhuang [yig]): spoken in Weining, Shuicheng, Hezhang, Nayong, Yiliang, Huize, and Xuanwei counties
  - Mangbu 芒部土语: spoken in Zhenxiong and Hezhang counties
  - Wumeng 乌蒙土语 (Yang Zhuang [ywu]): spoken in Zhaotong and Yongshan
- Pan 盘县次方言: spoken in Xingren, Pu'an, Qinglong, Shuicheng, Fuyuan, and Luoping counties
- Diandongbei 滇东北次方言: 5 dialects
  - Luquan 武禄土语: spoken in Wuding, Luquan, Yuanmou, Xundian, Lufeng, and Huize counties
  - Qiaowu 巧武土语 (Qiaojia-Wuding): spoken in Qiaojia, Wuding, Luquan, Yuanmou, and Huize counties
  - Wuding 武定土语: spoken in Wuding, Yongren, and Lufeng counties
  - Xundian 寻甸土语: spoken in Xundian, Luquan, Huize, Songming, Luxi, Shizong, Luoping, and Mile counties
  - Kun'an 昆安土语 (Kunming-Anning): spoken in Anning and Lufeng counties

=== Huang (1993) ===
In his description of the Yi script (not the spoken language), Huáng Jiànmíng (1993) holds that the Nasu variety of the Yi script is used by the groups speaking languages of the Nasu language cluster of Northern Yi in south-eastern Sìchuān, eastern Yúnnán, Gùizhōu, as well as in Guǎngxī. He distinguishes two sub-groups. Nasu proper used in Wuding, Luquan, and the suburbs of Kunming, and Wusa used in Guizhou and the bordering areas of Eastern Yunnan.

=== Bradley (1997) ===
David Bradley (1997) distinguishes three main dialects of Nasu:

- Southeastern (Panxian): 150,000 speakers in southwestern Guizhou
- Northeastern (Nesu): 300,000 speakers, comprising most of the other Nasu speakers of Guizhou, and some in extreme northeastern Yunnan and southeastern Sichuan
  - Shuixi subdialect 水西土语
  - Wusa subdialect 乌撒土语
  - Mangbu subdialect 芒部土语
  - Wumeng subdialect 乌蒙土语
- Western (Nasu proper): 250,000 speakers all in north-central Yunnan; Black (more numerous) and Red subdialects

=== Lama (2012) ===
Lama (2012) determined that Nasu (Western) is more closely related to Gepo than it is to the others:

- Nesu
  - Panxian (Nasepho, na33 su33 pʰo55): North and South dialects
  - Shuixi Nesu (Dafang Nesu)
  - Nesu proper
    - Wumeng
    - Mangbu
    - Wusa (Wusa Nasu)
- Nasu
  - Nasu proper
  - Gepo (ko33 pʰu44): 100,000 speakers

== Phonology ==
=== Consonants ===
		Labial	Alveolar	(Alveolo-) palatal	Retroflex	Velar	Glottal
Nasal		m	n	ȵ	ɳ	ŋ	
Stop	voiceless	p	t		ʈ	k	
Stop	aspirated	pʰ	tʰ		ʈʰ	kʰ	
Stop	voiced	b	d		ɖ	ɡ	
Stop	prenasal/asp.	ᵐbʱ	ⁿdʱ		ᶯɖʱ	ᵑɡʱ	
Affricate	voiceless		t͡s	t͡ɕ	t͡ʂ		
Affricate	aspirated		t͡sʰ	t͡ɕʰ	t͡ʂʰ		
Affricate	voiced		d͡z	d͡ʑ	d͡ʐ		
Affricate	prenasal/asp.		ⁿd͡zʱ	ⁿd͡ʑʱ	ᶯd͡ʐʱ		
Fricative	voiceless	f	s	ɕ	ʂ	x	h
Fricative	voiced	v	z	ʑ	ʐ	ɣ	
Fricative	lateral		ɬ				
Lateral			l				

- The phonetic sound of /h/ is mainly heard as [ɦh].

=== Vowels ===
There is distinction between tight-throat vowels and lax-throat (plain) vowels.

	Front		Central		Back			
	unrd.	tight	unrd.	tight	unrd.	rnd.	tight	
Close	i	i̱			ɯ	u		
Mid	e	e̱	ə˞	ə̱˞	ɤ	o, õ	ɤ̱	o̱
Open-mid						ɔ		
Open			a	a̱				

- Sounds /i, i̱/ are heard as syllabic consonants [z̩, ẕ̩] when following alveolar sounds /t͡s, t͡sʰ, d͡z, ⁿd͡zʱ, s, z/, and as syllabic retroflex [ʐ̩, ʐ̱̩] when following retroflex sounds /t͡ʂ, t͡ʂʰ, d͡ʐ, ᶯd͡ʐʱ, ʂ, ʐ/.
- The phonetic sounds of the rhoticized vowels /ə˞, ə̱˞/ are mainly heard as more back [ʌ˞, ʌ̱˞].

=== Tones ===
3 tones occur as follows:

Name	Pitch	Symbol
High	55	˦
Mid	33	˧
Low (falling)	21	˨˩

== See also ==
- Nesu word list (Wiktionary; has comparisons with Nasu)

== Bibliography ==
- Bradley, David (1997). "Tibeto-Burman languages and classification". In Tibeto-Burman languages of the Himalayas, Papers in South East Asian linguistics. Canberra: Pacific Linguistics.
- Chen Kang [陈康]. 2010. A study of Yi dialects [彝语方言研究]. Beijing: China Minzu University Press.
- Lama, Ziwo Qiu-Fuyuan (2012), Subgrouping of Nisoic (Yi) Languages, thesis, University of Texas at Arlington.
- Lu Lin 卢琳. 2017. Yiyu Shuicheng Zhichanghua yanjiu 彝语水城纸厂话研究. In Guizhou Minzu Yanjiu 贵州民族研究. doi:10.13965/j.cnki.gzmzyj10026959.2017.11.048
