= Lian River (Yunnan) =

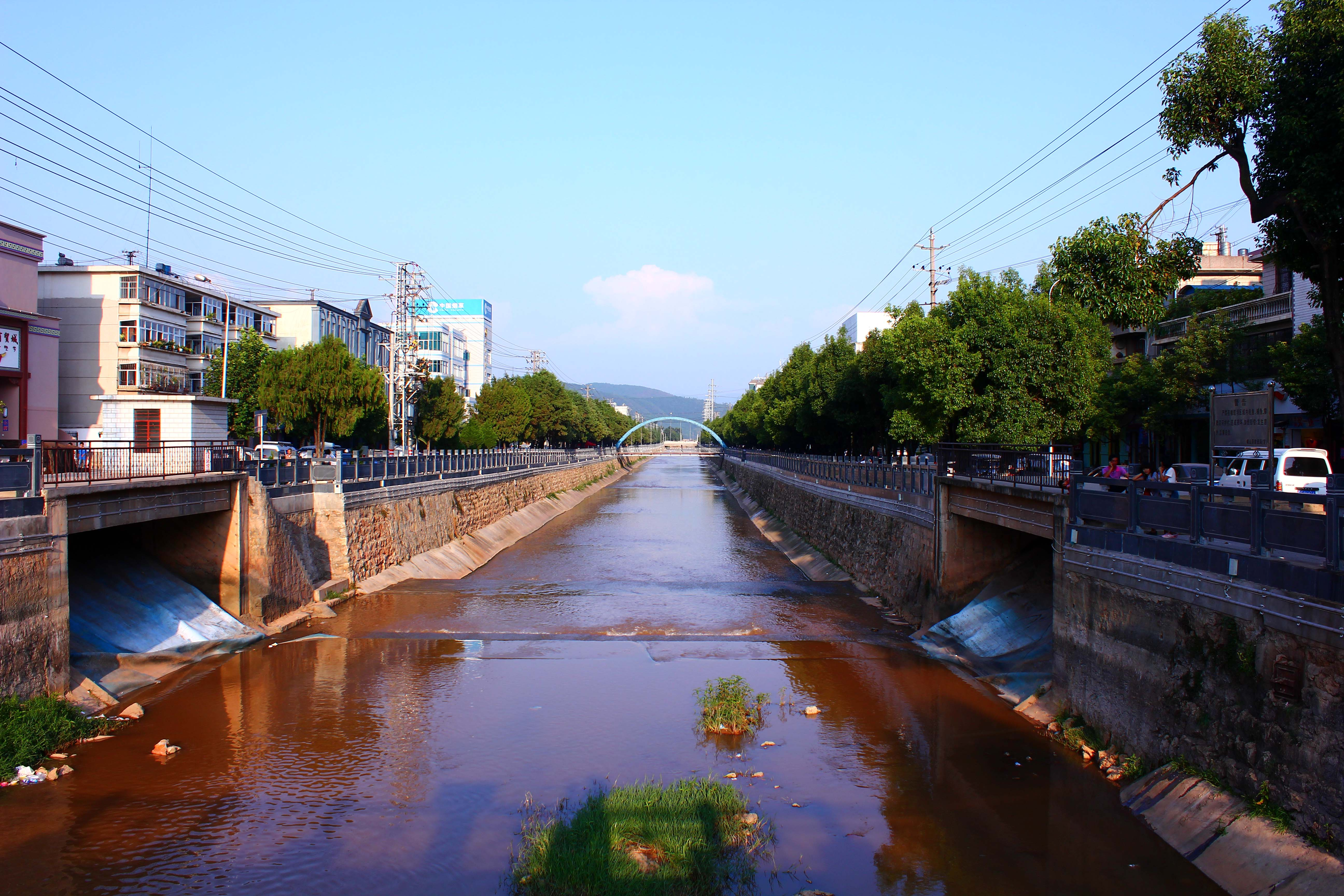
- Lian River in Eshan Yi Autonomous County.

Location
- Country: People's Republic of China

Physical characteristics
- Source
  - location: Northern Shiping County, Yunnan Province
- Mouth
  - location: Qu River, Shuangjiang, Eshan County, Yunnan Province
- Length: 49.6 km (30.8 mi)

The Lian River (Chinese: 练江; pinyin: Liàn Jiāng), also known as the Lianzhuang River (Chinese: 练庄河; pinyin: Liànzhuāng Hé), is a river in central Yunnan province, southwestern China. It is a tributary of the Qu River, which itself flows into the Nanpan River, part of the larger Pearl River basin. The Lian River has a total length of approximately 49.6 kilometres (30.8 mi).

== Geography ==
The Lian River rises in northern Shiping County, in Honghe Hani and Yi Autonomous Prefecture. It flows northwestward into Eshan Yi Autonomous County, part of Yuxi City, before turning northeast. The river passes through Shuangjiang Subdistrict, the county seat of Eshan County, before emptying into the Qu River.

The Qu River, which the Lian joins, is a significant waterway in central Yunnan with a length of 208 km, and ultimately drains into the Nanpan River (a tributary of the Pearl River).

== Surrounding area ==
Eshan Yi Autonomous County, through which the lower Lian River flows, is located in the central part of Yunnan Province at an average elevation of 1,691 metres (5,548 ft). The county is home to the Yi people, and was the first Yi Autonomous County established in the People's Republic of China (1951). The terrain of the area is characterised by mountain valleys alternating with river corridors, shaped in part by the cutting action of the Qu River system.
