= Shuangjiang, Eshan County =

Shuangjiang Subdistrict
- Subdistrict

Chinese transcription(s)
  - Simplified: 双江街道
  - Traditional: 雙江街道
  - Pinyin: Shuāngjiāng Jiēdào
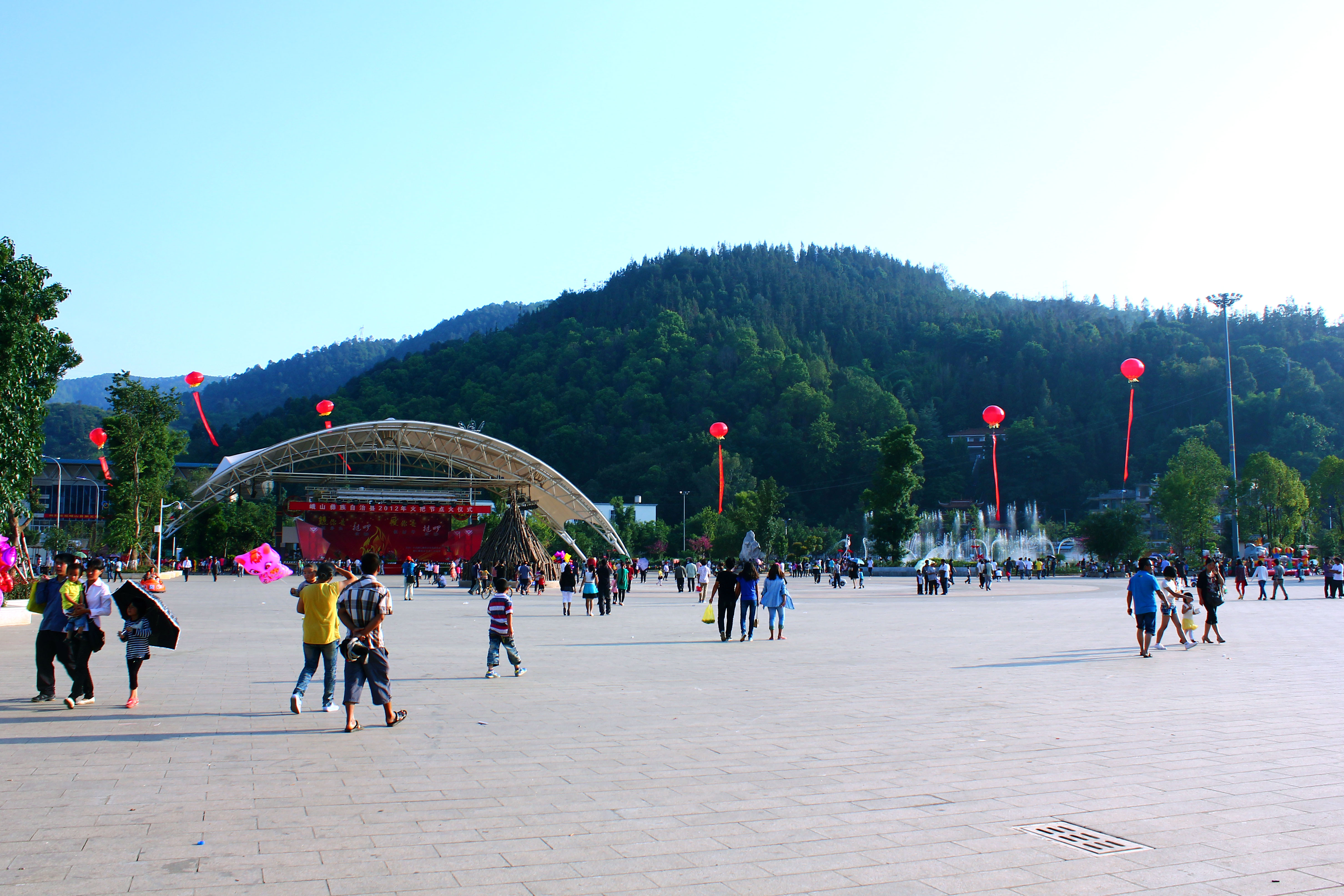
- The Square of National Unity in Eshan County

- Location within Yunnan
- Coordinates: 24°10′30″N 102°24′20″E
- Country: China
- Province: Yunnan
- Prefecture-level city: Yuxi
- County: Eshan Yi Autonomous County

Area
  - Total: 320.59 km^{2} (123.78 sq mi)
- Elevation: 1,538 m (5,046 ft)

Population (2011)
  - Total: 48,091
  - Density: 150.01/km^{2} (388.52/sq mi)
- Time zone: UTC+8 (China Standard)
- Postal code: 653299
- Area code: 0877

Shuangjiang Subdistrict (Chinese: 双江街道; pinyin: Shuāngjiāng Jiēdào) is a subdistrict and the county seat of Eshan Yi Autonomous County, Yunnan, southwestern China. The name Shuangjiang means "two rivers" in Chinese language because it is located near where Lian River joins the Ni River.
