= Yangguang =

Yangguang 杨广镇
- Town
- Location in Yunnan
- Coordinates: 24°8′17″N 102°47′43″E
- Country: People's Republic of China
- Province: Yunnan
- Prefecture-level city: Yuxi
- County: Tonghai County
- Time zone: UTC+8 (China Standard)

Yangguang (Chinese: 杨广; pinyin: Yángguǎng) is a town in Tonghai County, Yuxi, Yunnan. As of 2020, it administers Yangguang Residential Community and the following ten villages:

- Yunlong Village (云龙村)
- Gucheng Village (古城村)
- Daxin Village (大新村)
- Zhenhai Village (镇海村)
- Yiguangshao Village (义广哨村)
- Xingyi Village (兴义村)
- Majiawan Village (马家湾村)
- Yanghaigou Village (杨梅沟村)
- Wunaoshan Village (五垴山村)
- Luofeng Village (落凤村)
