= Qu River =

Qu River may refer to:

- Qu River (Jialing River tributary), in Sichuan and Chongqing, China
- Qu River (Yuan River tributary), in Hunan, China
- Qu River (Yunnan), tributary of the Nanpan River in Yunnan, China
