= Tonghai County =

Tonghai 通海县
- County
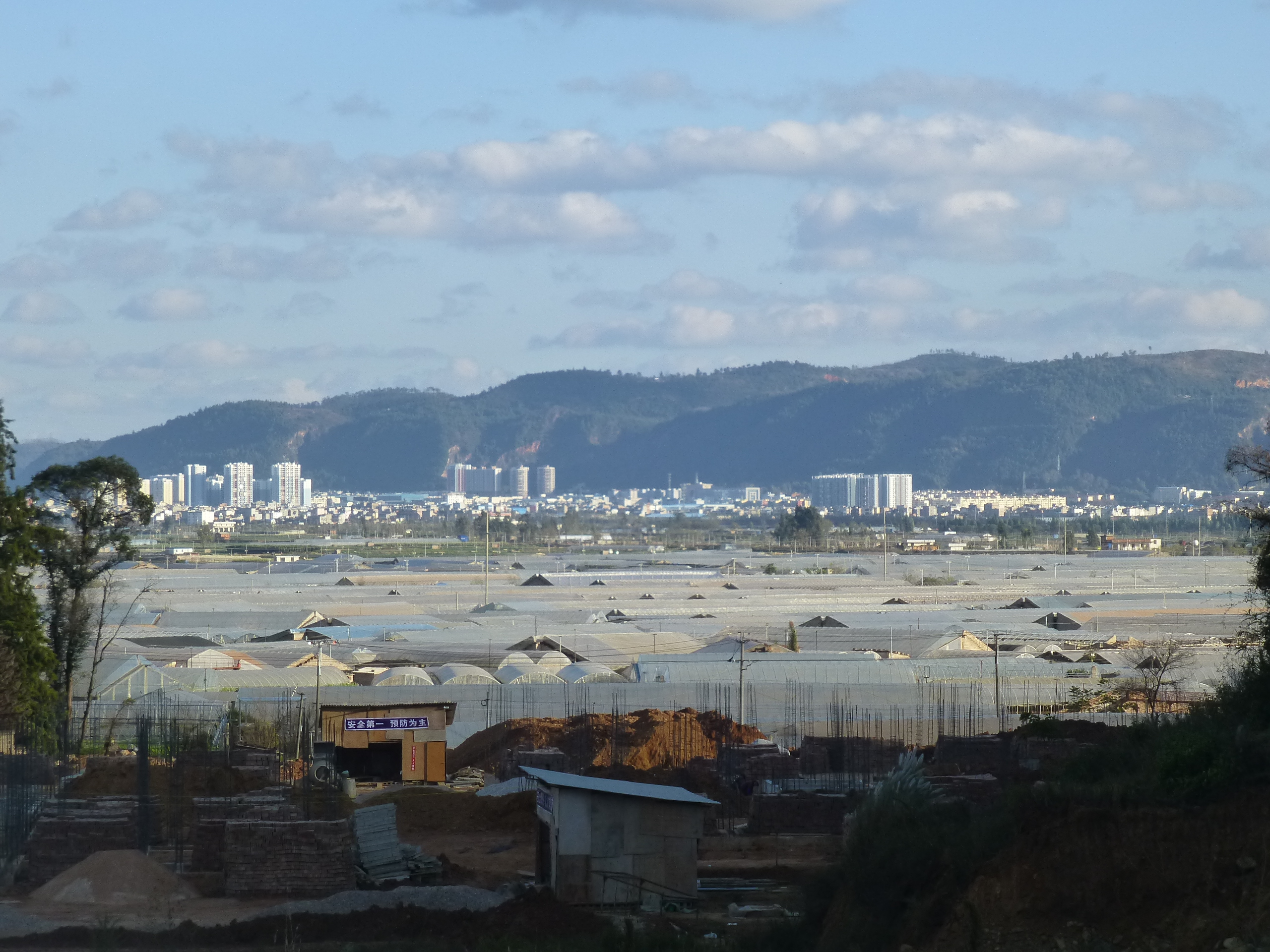
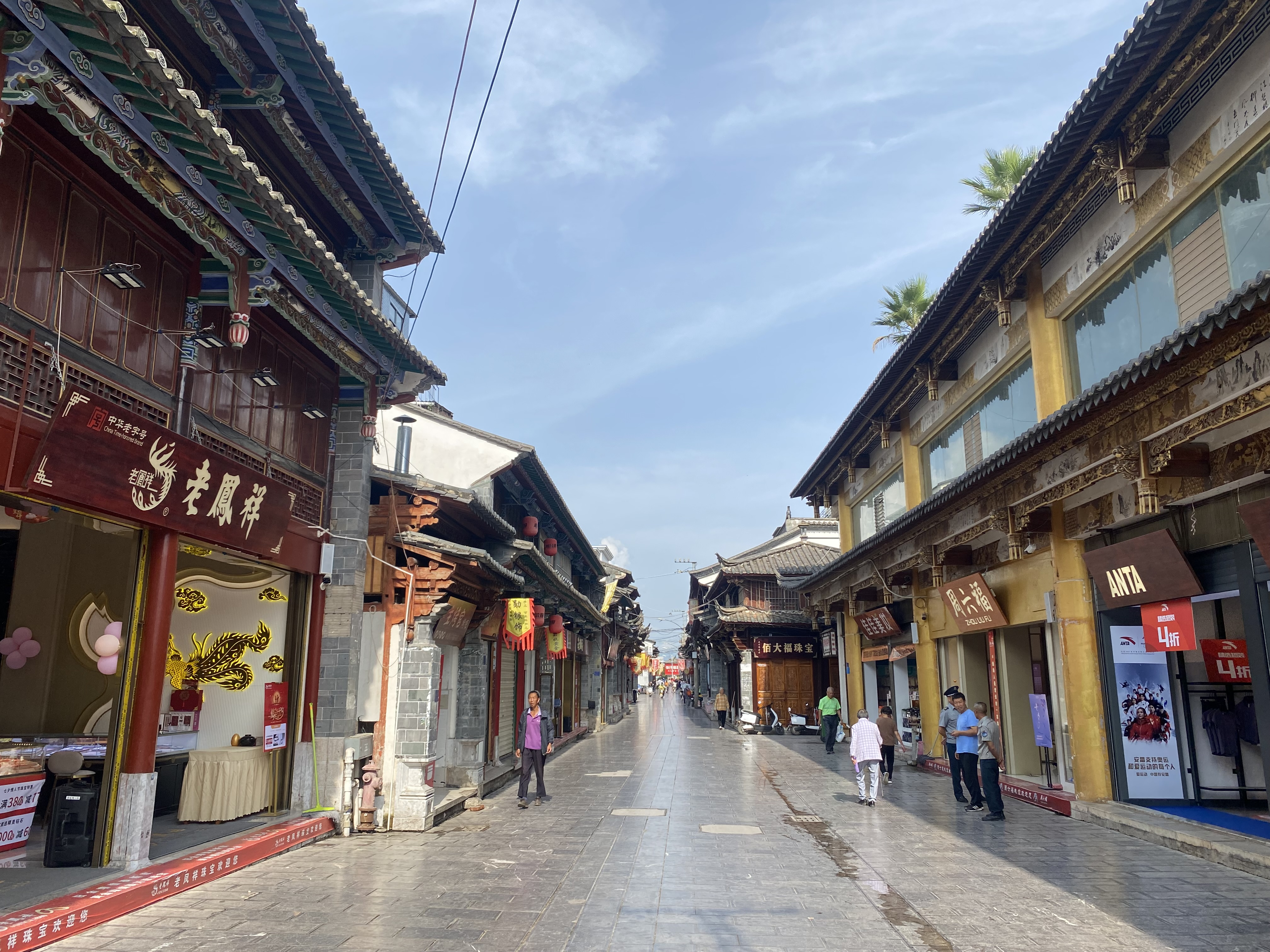
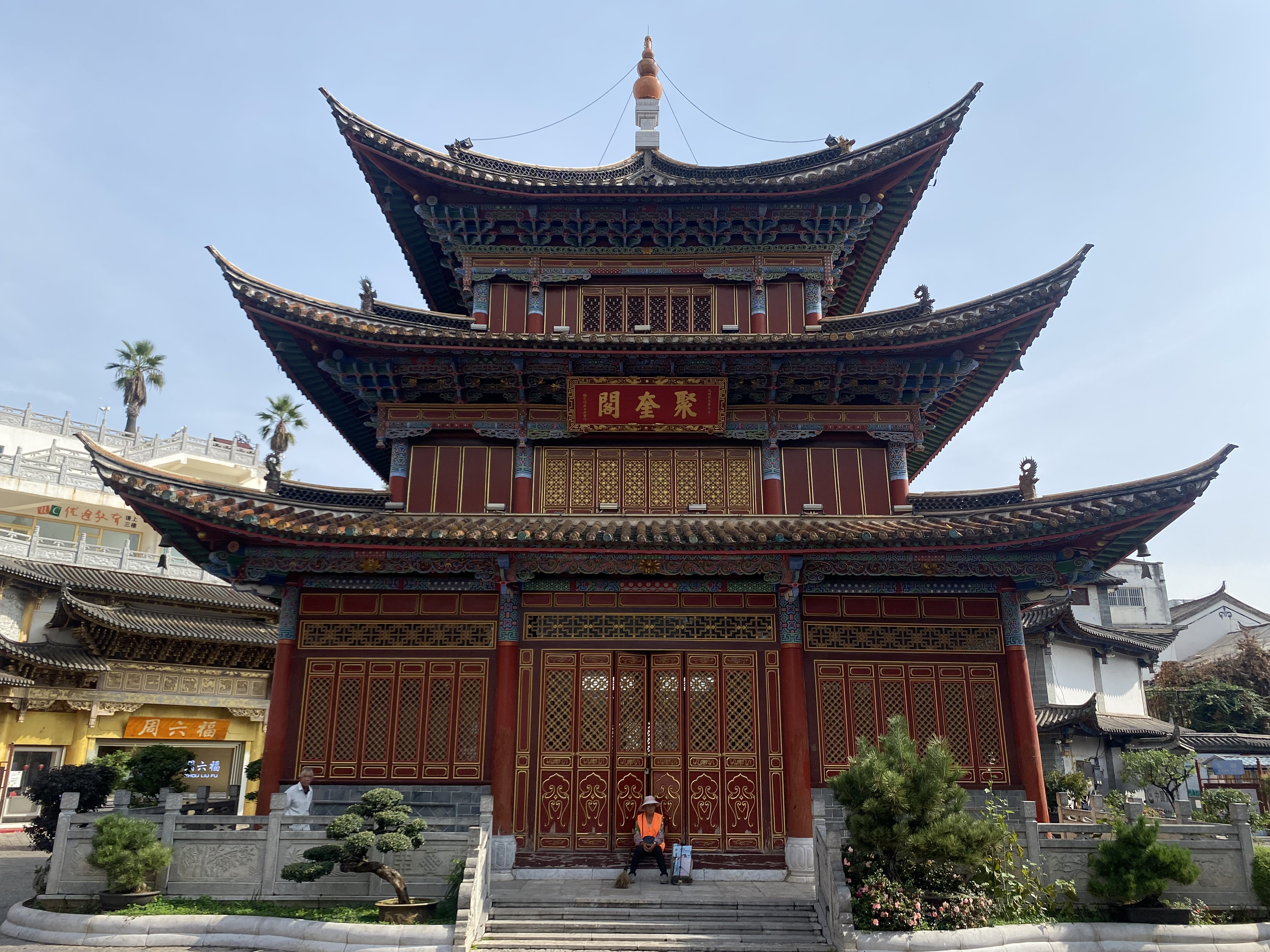
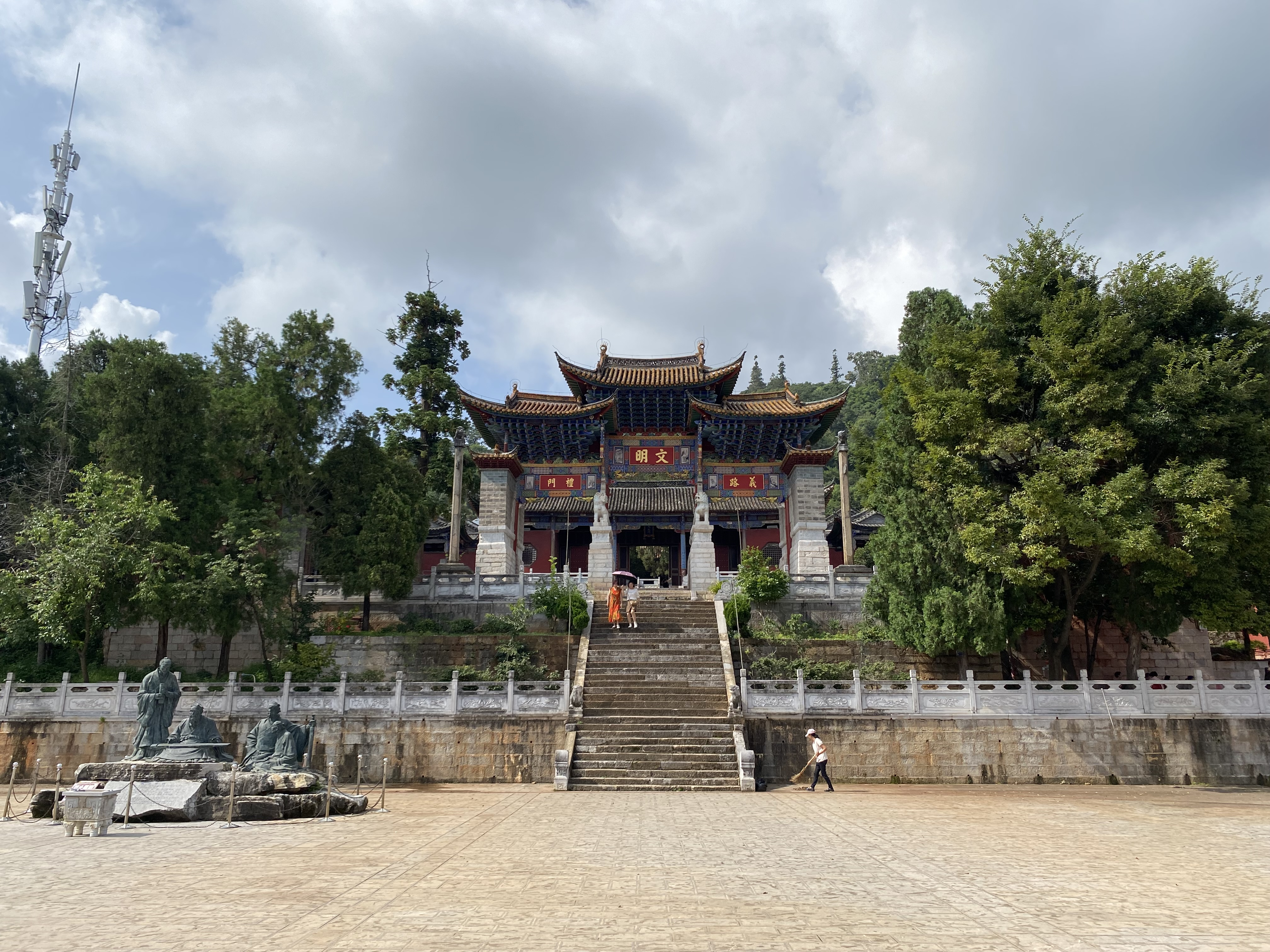
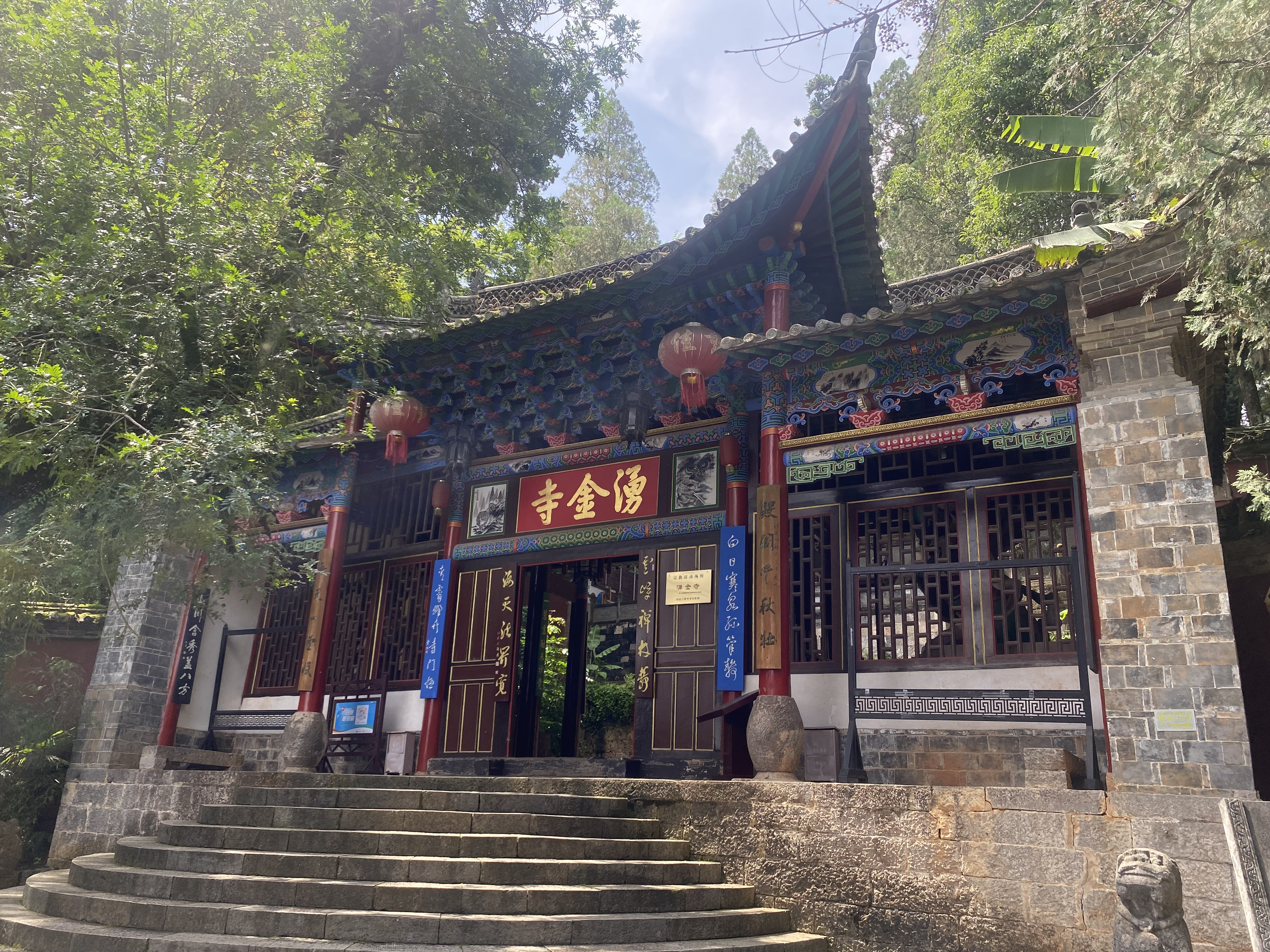
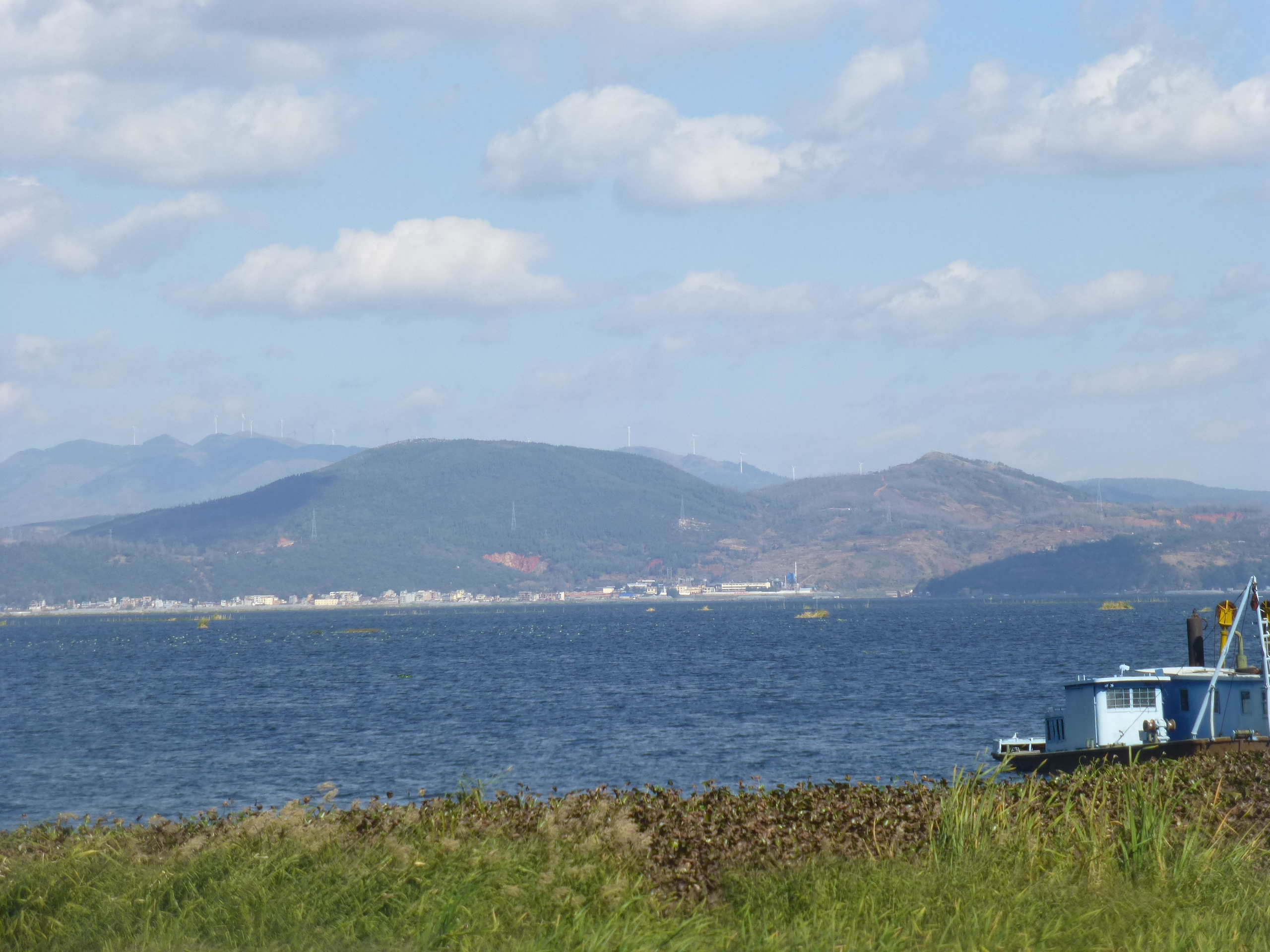
- Skyline of county town West Street Jukui Pavilion Tonghai Confucius Temple Yongjin Temple Qilu Lake

- Location of Tonghai County (red) and Yuxi City (pink) within Yunnan
- Country: People's Republic of China
- Province: Yunnan
- Prefecture-level city: Yuxi

Area
  - Total: 1,114 km^{2} (430 sq mi)

Population
  - Total: 260,617
  - Density: 233.9/km^{2} (605.9/sq mi)
- Time zone: UTC+8 (CST)
- Postal code: 652700
- Area code: 0877
- Coordinates: 24°05′36″N 102°45′00″E
- Website: www.tonghai.gov.cn

Tonghai County (Chinese: 通海县; pinyin: Tōnghǎi Xiàn) is located in Yuxi Prefecture-level City, Yunnan Province, China.

== Geography ==
Tonghai County borders Huaning County to the east, Shiping County and Jianshui County to the south, Eshan County and Hongta District to the west, and Jiangchuan District to the north.

Tonghai County occupies the fertile valley of Qilu Lake, surrounded on all sides by mountains. The county seat is located on the south side of the lake, separated from the lake by a mile-wide strip of farmland.

The county's southernmost part, including the Dagao Dai and Yi Ethnic Township and Lishan Yi Ethnic Township, is separated from the rest of the county by mountains; it is outside of the Qilu Lake basin, and is drained into the Qu River instead.

In 1970, a powerful earthquake struck the area.

== History ==
The area around Qilu Lake has been inhabited since at least the Neolithic period. In the Tang dynasty it was the base of a general. For many centuries it was the political, economic and military center of southern Yunnan.

Soon after the formation of PRC, the area of today's Tonghai County was organized as two counties: Tonghai and Hexi (in the western part of today's Tonghai County). The two counties were merged into Qilu County (杞麓县) on November 22, 1956. On October 22, 1959, Qilu County was renamed Tonghai County.

The county includes a large Muslim (Hui) population. Centers of Hui culture include Dahui and Xiaohui villages in Hexi Township, as well as Nagu Town, with its Najiaying Mosque.

Xingmeng Mongol Ethnic Township, home to the Yunnan Mongols (Khatso), is the only Mongol ethnic township in Yunnan.

== Administrative divisions ==
Tonghai County has 2 subdistricts, 4 towns and 3 ethnic townships.

2 subdistricts

- Xiushan (秀山街道)
- Jiulong (九龙街道)

4 towns

- Yangguang (杨广镇)
- Hexi (河西镇)
- Sijie (四街镇)
- Nagu (纳古镇)

3 ethnic townships

- Lishan Yi (里山彝族乡)
- Gaoda Dai and Yi (高大傣族彝族乡)
- Xingmeng Mongol (兴蒙蒙古族乡)

== Transportation ==
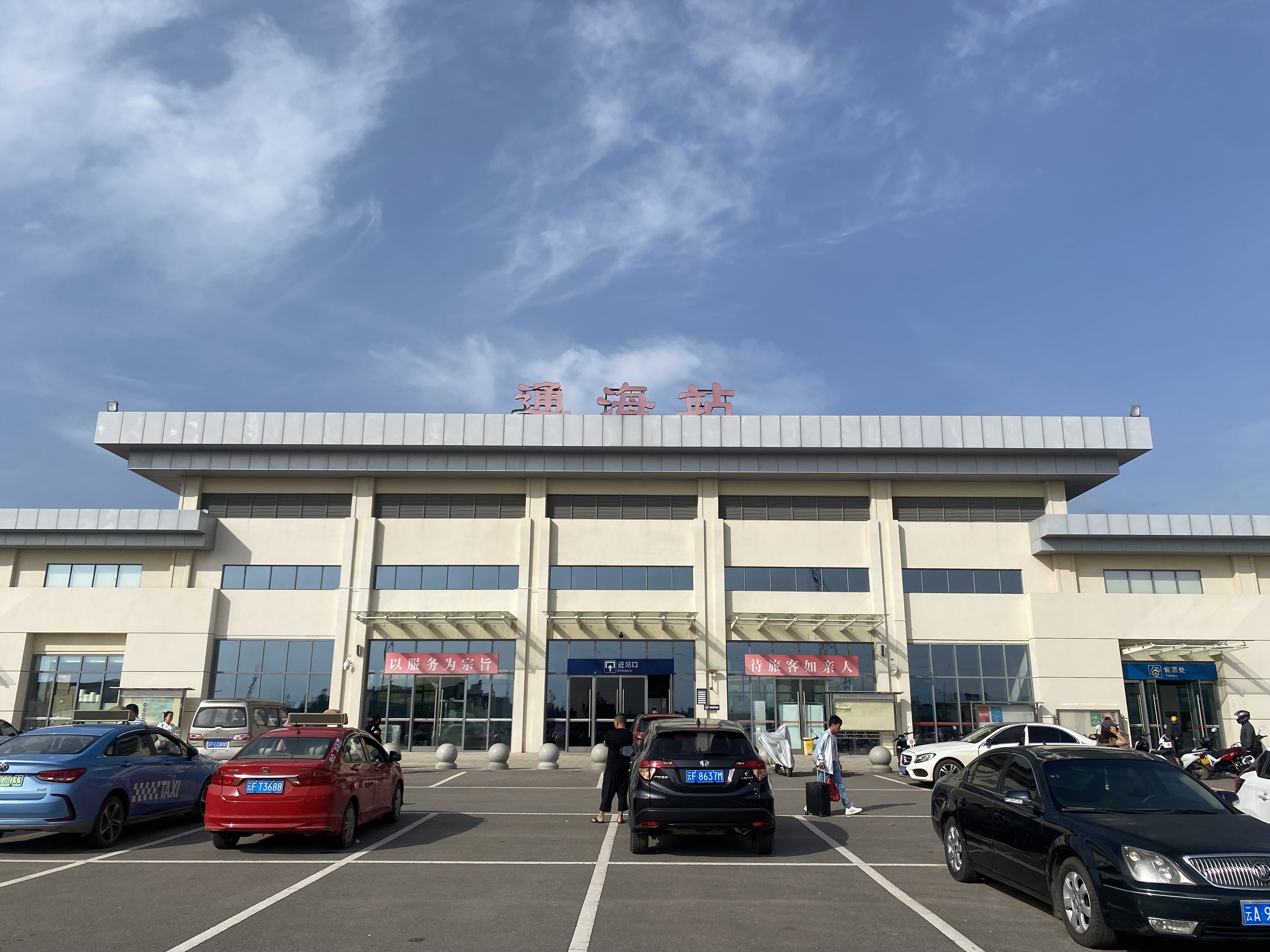
Tonghai Railway Station

Bus routes:

- Jianshui County (2hr)
- Gejiu (2hr)
- Hekou (13hr)
- Kaiyuan (4hr)
- Kunming (2hr)

Railway:

- Yuxi–Mengzi Railway (a section of the standard gauge Kunming–Hekou Railway). The passenger station, Tonghai Station, is located at Jiulong, a few kilometers west of the county seat.

== Climate ==
Climate data for Tonghai, elevation 1,802 m (5,912 ft), (1991–2020 normals, extremes 1981–present)
Month	Jan	Feb	Mar	Apr	May	Jun	Jul	Aug	Sep	Oct	Nov	Dec	Year
Record high °C (°F)	23.7 (74.7)	25.9 (78.6)	28.3 (82.9)	30.7 (87.3)	32.4 (90.3)	30.5 (86.9)	30.6 (87.1)	29.3 (84.7)	29.3 (84.7)	27.7 (81.9)	27.0 (80.6)	24.5 (76.1)	32.4 (90.3)
Mean daily maximum °C (°F)	16.5 (61.7)	18.9 (66.0)	22.0 (71.6)	24.1 (75.4)	25.7 (78.3)	26.0 (78.8)	25.1 (77.2)	25.1 (77.2)	23.9 (75.0)	21.4 (70.5)	19.4 (66.9)	16.2 (61.2)	22.0 (71.7)
Daily mean °C (°F)	10.0 (50.0)	12.2 (54.0)	15.4 (59.7)	17.8 (64.0)	20.2 (68.4)	21.2 (70.2)	20.7 (69.3)	20.3 (68.5)	19.1 (66.4)	16.5 (61.7)	13.1 (55.6)	10.1 (50.2)	16.4 (61.5)
Mean daily minimum °C (°F)	5.0 (41.0)	6.5 (43.7)	9.5 (49.1)	12.4 (54.3)	15.5 (59.9)	17.8 (64.0)	17.8 (64.0)	17.2 (63.0)	16.1 (61.0)	13.3 (55.9)	8.7 (47.7)	5.6 (42.1)	12.1 (53.8)
Record low °C (°F)	−2.8 (27.0)	−0.9 (30.4)	−3.2 (26.2)	3.2 (37.8)	6.7 (44.1)	11.5 (52.7)	11.9 (53.4)	11.2 (52.2)	7.8 (46.0)	4.3 (39.7)	−1.2 (29.8)	−5.5 (22.1)	−5.5 (22.1)
Average precipitation mm (inches)	27.6 (1.09)	16.8 (0.66)	21.4 (0.84)	39.9 (1.57)	82.9 (3.26)	145.7 (5.74)	183.6 (7.23)	150.4 (5.92)	99.7 (3.93)	74.4 (2.93)	35.1 (1.38)	16.5 (0.65)	894 (35.2)
Average precipitation days (≥ 0.1 mm)	4.4	4.1	5.2	8.1	11.5	15.1	19.7	19.0	13.5	11.4	5.3	4.0	121.3
Average snowy days	0.6	0.1	0.1	0	0	0	0	0	0	0	0	0.1	0.9
Average relative humidity (%)	70	62	57	59	67	77	81	82	80	80	77	75	72
Mean monthly sunshine hours	222.2	225.2	255.9	259.5	224.5	152.8	121.5	135.2	130.5	141.6	191.5	197.6	2,258
Percentage possible sunshine	66	70	68	68	54	37	29	34	36	40	59	60	52
Source: China Meteorological Administration all-time extreme temperatureall-time November record high
