= Hongta, Yuxi =

Hongta 红塔区
- District
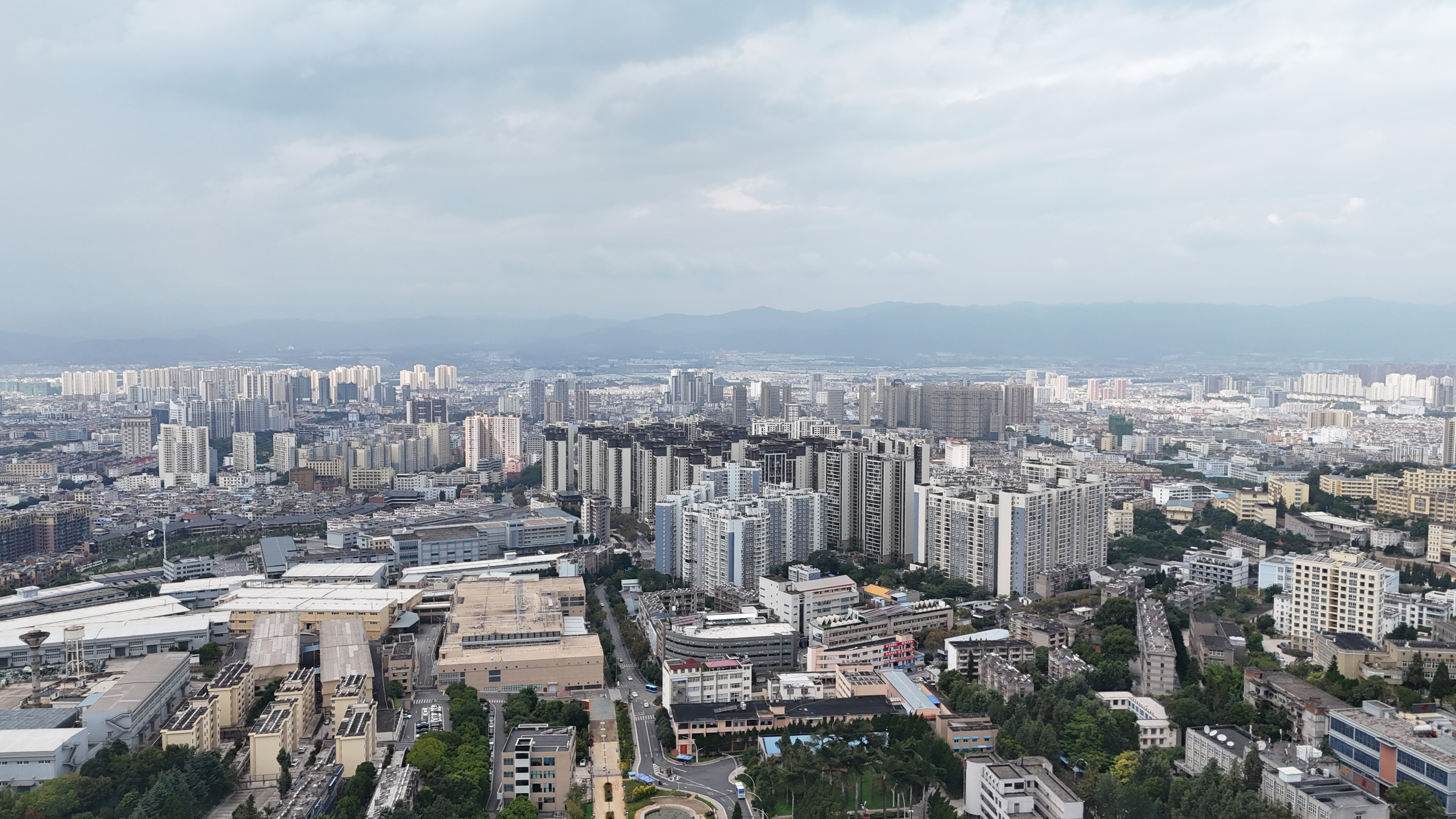

- Location of Hongta District (red) and Yuxi Prefecture (pink) within Yunnan province of China

- Location within China Hongta (China)
- Coordinates: 24°20′56″N 102°31′50″E
- Country: China
- Province: Yunnan
- Prefecture-level city: Yuxi
- District seat: Yuxing Subdistrict

Area
  - Total: 1,004 km^{2} (388 sq mi)

Population (2020 census)
  - Total: 588,738
  - Density: 586.4/km^{2} (1,519/sq mi)
- Postal code: 653100
- Area code: 0877
- Website: www.hongta.gov.cn

Hongta District (simplified Chinese: 红塔区; traditional Chinese: 紅塔區; pinyin: Hóngtǎ Qū) is the main district of Yuxi, Yunnan Province, China. It borders Jiangchuan District to the east, Jinning District to the north, Eshan County to the southwest and Tonghai County to the southeast.

== Administrative divisions ==
The county government of Yuxi City is seated in Hongta District.

Hongta District has 9 subdistricts and 2 ethnic townships.

9 subdistricts

- Yuxing (玉兴街道)
- Fenghuang (凤凰街道)
- Yudai (玉带街道)
- Beicheng (北城街道)
- Chunhe (春和街道)
- Liqi (李棋街道)
- Dayingjie (大营街街道)
- Yanhe (研和街道)
- Gaocang (高仓街道)

2 ethnic townships

- Xiaoshiqiao Yi Ethnic Township (小石桥彝族乡)
- Luohe Yi Ethnic Township (洛河彝族乡)

== Ethnic groups ==
The Yuxi City Almanac (1993:189) lists the following ethnic groups.

- Yi
  - Naisupo 乃苏泼 (in the east)
  - Niesupo 聂苏泼 (in the west)
  - Lalu 腊鲁
  - Sani 撒尼
  - Bula 卜拉
  - Xiangtang 香堂
  - Ache 阿车
- Bai (Sadu)
- Hani: pop. 972 (1987), in Meichong village 梅冲村, Hongta District

== Transportation ==
Yuxi railway station is located here.
