= Chahe Township =

Chahe Township 岔河乡
- Township
- Location in Yunnan
- Coordinates: 24°17′10″N 102°14′40″E
- Country: People's Republic of China
- Province: Yunnan
- Prefecture-level city: Yuxi
- Autonomous county: Eshan Yi Autonomous County
- Time zone: UTC+8 (China Standard)

Chahe Township (simplified Chinese: 岔河乡; traditional Chinese: 岔河鄉; pinyin: Chàhé Xiāng) is a township in Eshan Yi Autonomous County, Yunnan, China. As of 2020, it administers the following seven villages:

- Qinghe Village (青河村)
- Pengzuba Village (棚租坝村)
- Hewai Village (河外村)
- Wenshan Village (文山村)
- Anju Village (安居村)
- Yunmei Village (云美村)
- Xiezha Village (谢札村)
