= Luju, Yunnan =

Luju 路居镇
- Town
- Location in Yunnan
- Coordinates: 24°20′37″N 102°51′47″E
- Country: People's Republic of China
- Province: Yunnan
- Prefecture-level city: Yuxi
- District: Jiangchuan District
- Time zone: UTC+8 (China Standard)

Luju (Chinese: 路居; pinyin: Lùjū) is a town in Jiangchuan District, Yuxi, Yunnan province, China. As of 2020, it has two residential neighborhoods and six villages under its administration:

Neighborhoods

- Zhongba Community (中坝社区)
- Xiaba Community (下坝社区)

Villages

- Shiyanshao Village (石岩哨村)
- Luoshipu Village (螺蛳铺村)
- Lantian Village (兰田村)
- Shangba Village (上坝村)
- Hongshiyan Village (红石岩村)
- Xiao'ao Village (小凹村)

== See also ==
- List of township-level divisions of Yunnan
