= Liqi Subdistrict =

Liqi Subdistrict 李棋街道
- Subdistrict
- Location in Yunnan
- Coordinates: 24°23′17″N 102°33′7″E
- Country: People's Republic of China
- Province: Yunnan
- Prefecture-level city: Yuxi
- District: Hongta District
- Time zone: UTC+8 (China Standard)

Liqi Subdistrict (Chinese: 李棋街道; pinyin: Lǐqí Jiēdào) is a subdistrict in Hongta District, Yuxi, Yunnan, China. As of 2018, it has 9 residential communities under its administration.

== See also ==
- List of township-level divisions of Yunnan
