= Lianjiang =

Lianjiang/Lienchiang may refer to:

- Lianjiang County (连江县), Fuzhou, Fujian, China (PRC)
- Lienchiang County (連江縣), also the Matsu Islands, Fujian Province, Republic of China (Taiwan)
- Lianjiang, Guangdong (廉江市), county-level city of Zhanjiang, Guangdong
- Lianjiang, Anhui (zh; 连江镇), town in and subdivision of Dingyuan County, Anhui
- Lianjiang, Jiangxi (zh; 潋江镇), town in and subdivision of Xingguo County, Jiangxi
- Lian River (disambiguation), several rivers in China
