= Daqiao Township, Shiping County =

Daqiao Township 大桥乡
- Township
- Location in Yunnan
- Coordinates: 23°51′45″N 102°21′09″E
- Country: People's Republic of China
- Province: Yunnan
- Autonomous prefecture: Honghe
- County: Shiping
- Village-level divisions: 9 villages
- Elevation: 1,116 m (3,661 ft)
- Time zone: UTC+8 (China Standard)
- Area code: 0873

Daqiao Township (simplified Chinese: 大桥乡; traditional Chinese: 大橋鄉; pinyin: Dàqiáo Xiāng; lit. 'great or large bridge') is a township of Shiping County in south-central Yunnan province, China; it is situated about 21 kilometres (13 mi) northwest of the county seat and 118 km (73 mi) northwest of Mengzi City, the prefectural seat, as the crow flies. As of 2018, it has nine villages under its administration.
