= Zhengying =

Zhengying 郑营村
- Village
- Location in Yunnan
- Coordinates: 23°44′40″N 102°24′15″E
- Country: People's Republic of China
- Province: Yunnan
- Autonomous prefecture: Honghe
- County: Shiping
- Town: Baoxiu

Zhengying (simplified Chinese: 郑营; traditional Chinese: 鄭營; pinyin: Zhèngyíng; lit. 'Zheng camp') is an historic village located in Baoxiu (宝秀镇), Shiping County, in the south of Yunnan province, China.

== See also ==
- Tuoshan village of Jianshui
- Shaxi, Yunnan
