= Qu River (Yunnan) =

River in Yunnan, China

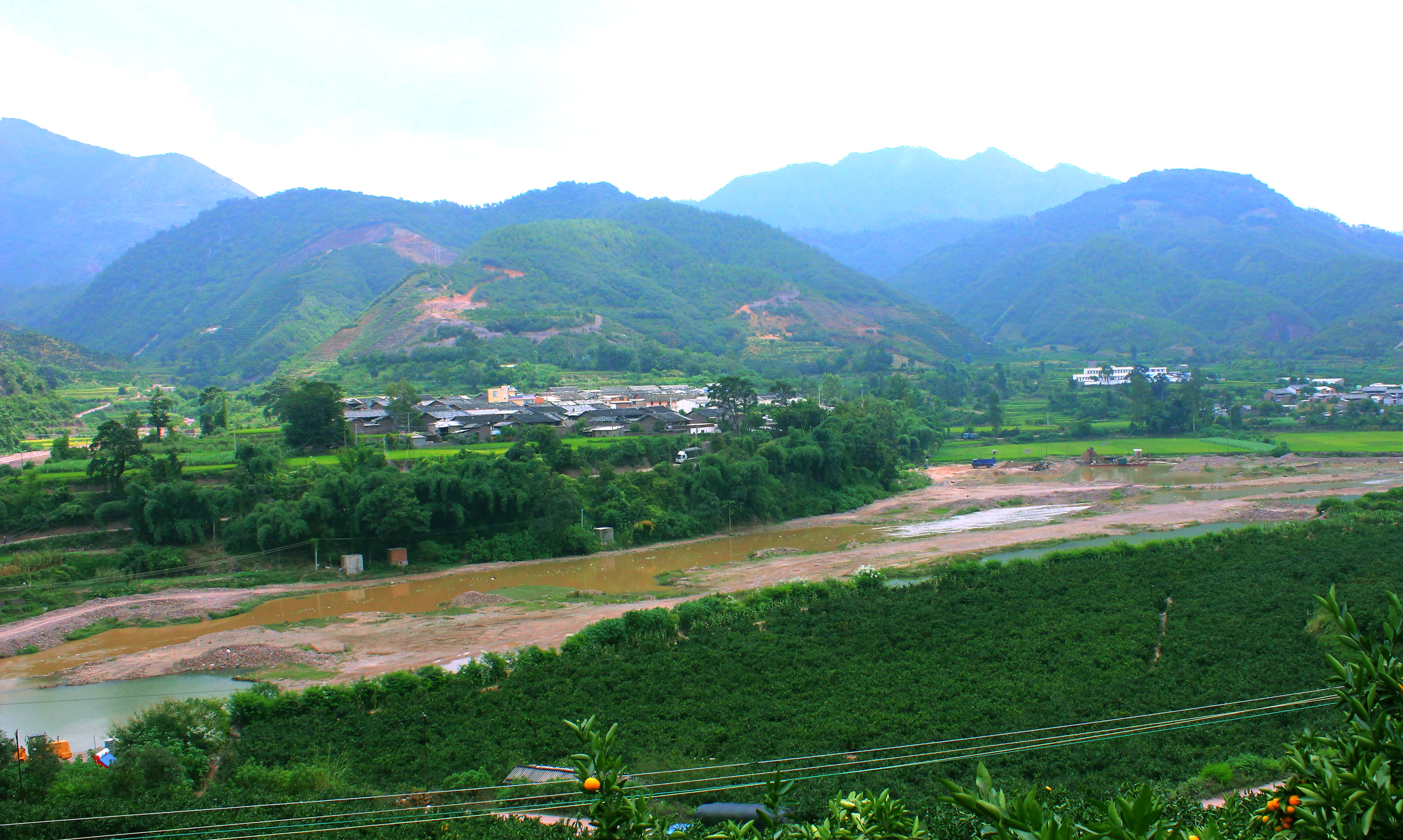
Huaxi River in Huaning County.

The Qu River (Chinese: 曲江; pinyin: Qǔ Jiāng) is a tributary of the Nanpan River (Pearl River) in Yunnan province, southwestern China. The Qu rises in southwestern Jiangchuan County and flows through the Yuxi City, Eshan Yi Autonomous County, Tonghai County, Jianshui County and Huaning County to reach its mouth at the Panxi Town of the Huaning County. The river has a length of 208 km and drains an area of 3,472 square km.

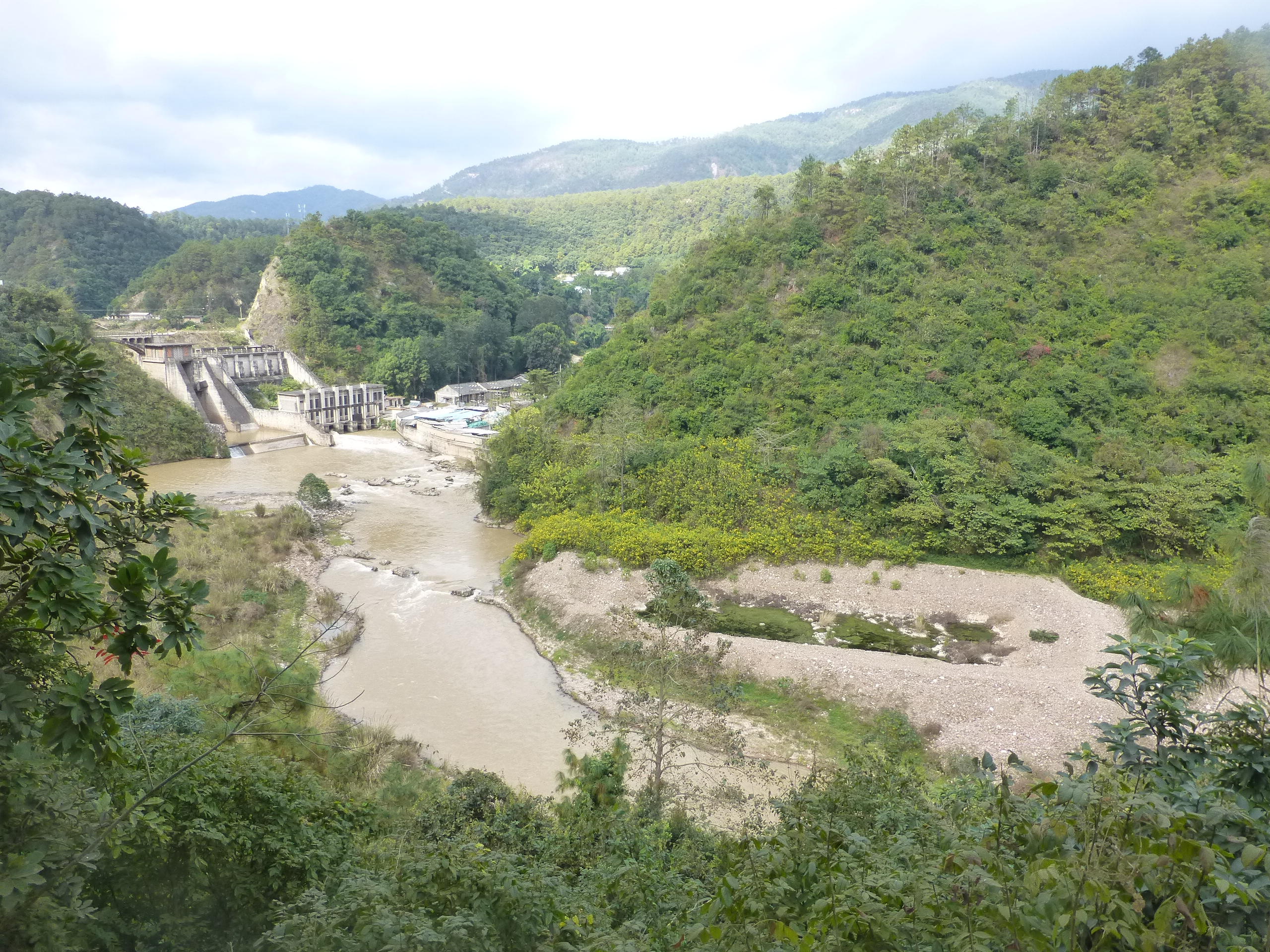
Mabozi Dam on the Qu River, in Tonghai County near the border with Jianshui County

There are some distinct names for the river in different places:

- Jiangchuan County: Jiuxi River (Chinese: 九溪大河; pinyin: JiǔXī DàHé)
- Yuxi City: Zhou River (Chinese: 州大河; pinyin: Zhōu DàHé) or Yuxi River (Chinese: 玉溪大河; pinyin: YùXī DàHé)
- Eshan Yi Autonomous County: Ni River (Chinese: 猊江; pinyin: Ní Jiāng) or Eshan River (Chinese: 峨山大河; pinyin: Éshān DàHé)
- Tonghai County: Liucun River (Chinese: 六村大河; pinyin: Liùcūn DàHé)
- Jianshui County: Zhuji River (Chinese: 竹鸡河; pinyin: Zhújī Hé)
- Huaning County: Huaxi River (Chinese: 华溪河; pinyin: HuáXī Hé)

== Hydroelectric dams ==
The Mabozi Dam (马脖子电站) on the Qu River was constructed in 1977–1981. The station is located in Tonghai County near the border with Jianshui County, near the village called Caozi (槽子 or 漕子) in the Gaoda Dai and Yi Ethnic Township.
