= Yimen County =

Yimen 易门县
- County
- Location of Yimen County (red) and Yuxi City (pink) within Yunnan
- Coordinates: 24°40′19″N 102°09′47″E
- Country: People's Republic of China
- Province: Yunnan
- Prefecture: Yuxi City

Area
  - Total: 1,114 km^{2} (430 sq mi)

Population
  - Total: 170,946
  - Density: 153.5/km^{2} (397.4/sq mi)
- Time zone: UTC+8 (CST)
- Postal code: 651100
- Area code: 0877
- Website: www.yimen.gov.cn

Yimen County (simplified Chinese: 易门县; traditional Chinese: 易門縣; pinyin: Yìmén Xiàn) is a county in the central part of Yunnan Province, China. It is under the administration of the prefecture-level city of Yuxi.

== Geography ==
Yimen borders Anning and Jinning District to the east, Eshan County to the south, Shuangbai County to the west, and Lufeng to the north.

== Administrative divisions ==
Yimen County has 2 subdistricts, 1 town, 2 townships and 3 ethnic townships.

2 subdistricts

- Longquan (龙泉街道)
- Liujie (六街街道)

1 town

- Shizi (柿子镇)

2 townships

- Luzhi (绿汁镇)
- Xiaojie (小街乡)

3 ethnic townships

- Pubei Yi (浦贝彝族乡)
- Shijie Yi (十街彝族乡)
- Tongchang Yi (铜厂彝族乡)

== Climate ==
Climate data for Yimen, elevation 1,601 m (5,253 ft), (1991–2020 normals, extremes 1981–present)
Month	Jan	Feb	Mar	Apr	May	Jun	Jul	Aug	Sep	Oct	Nov	Dec	Year
Record high °C (°F)	25.4 (77.7)	28.2 (82.8)	30.6 (87.1)	32.0 (89.6)	35.6 (96.1)	36.1 (97.0)	33.2 (91.8)	31.6 (88.9)	31.9 (89.4)	30.2 (86.4)	28.7 (83.7)	26.2 (79.2)	36.1 (97.0)
Mean daily maximum °C (°F)	19.0 (66.2)	21.7 (71.1)	24.4 (75.9)	27.1 (80.8)	27.7 (81.9)	27.9 (82.2)	27.2 (81.0)	27.2 (81.0)	26.0 (78.8)	24.1 (75.4)	21.2 (70.2)	18.5 (65.3)	24.3 (75.8)
Daily mean °C (°F)	9.7 (49.5)	12.1 (53.8)	15.3 (59.5)	18.8 (65.8)	21.1 (70.0)	22.4 (72.3)	22.0 (71.6)	21.4 (70.5)	20.1 (68.2)	17.7 (63.9)	13.3 (55.9)	10.1 (50.2)	17.0 (62.6)
Mean daily minimum °C (°F)	2.7 (36.9)	4.0 (39.2)	7.2 (45.0)	11.1 (52.0)	15.4 (59.7)	18.3 (64.9)	18.4 (65.1)	17.8 (64.0)	16.1 (61.0)	13.6 (56.5)	8.1 (46.6)	4.3 (39.7)	11.4 (52.6)
Record low °C (°F)	−3.1 (26.4)	−2.7 (27.1)	−2.5 (27.5)	1.6 (34.9)	6.4 (43.5)	11.1 (52.0)	13.6 (56.5)	10.9 (51.6)	7.1 (44.8)	4.7 (40.5)	−1.9 (28.6)	−4.6 (23.7)	−4.6 (23.7)
Average precipitation mm (inches)	22.2 (0.87)	12.1 (0.48)	16.9 (0.67)	26.9 (1.06)	70.8 (2.79)	143.5 (5.65)	160.6 (6.32)	159.0 (6.26)	91.9 (3.62)	66.5 (2.62)	31.5 (1.24)	12.5 (0.49)	814.4 (32.07)
Average precipitation days (≥ 0.1 mm)	4.2	3.6	5.0	7.0	10.4	14.1	19.0	19.1	12.9	11.3	5.9	4.4	116.9
Average snowy days	0.3	0	0.1	0	0	0	0	0	0	0	0	0.1	0.5
Average relative humidity (%)	72	64	59	58	63	74	81	82	80	79	78	76	72
Mean monthly sunshine hours	204.0	221.2	242.0	238.4	205.0	136.3	106.8	123.1	123.4	135.0	168.0	170.4	2,073.6
Percentage possible sunshine	61	69	65	62	50	33	26	31	34	38	52	52	48
Source: China Meteorological Administration all-time extreme temperatureall-time November record high
