= Lian River =

Lian River may refer to these rivers in China:

- Lian River (Chaoshan) (Chinese: 练江), a river in eastern Guangdong which flows into Haimen Bay (海門灣) in Haimen Town (海門鎮), Chaoyang District of Shantou
- Lian River (Bei River tributary) (Chinese: 连江), a river in northwestern Guangdong, the largest tributary of Bei River
- Lian River (Yunnan) (Chinese: 练江), a tributary of Qu River in Yunan Province
- Lianshui River or Lian River (Chinese: 涟水 or 涟水河), one of the largest tributaries of Xiang River in Hunan Province
