= Shiping County =

Shiping County 石屏县
- County
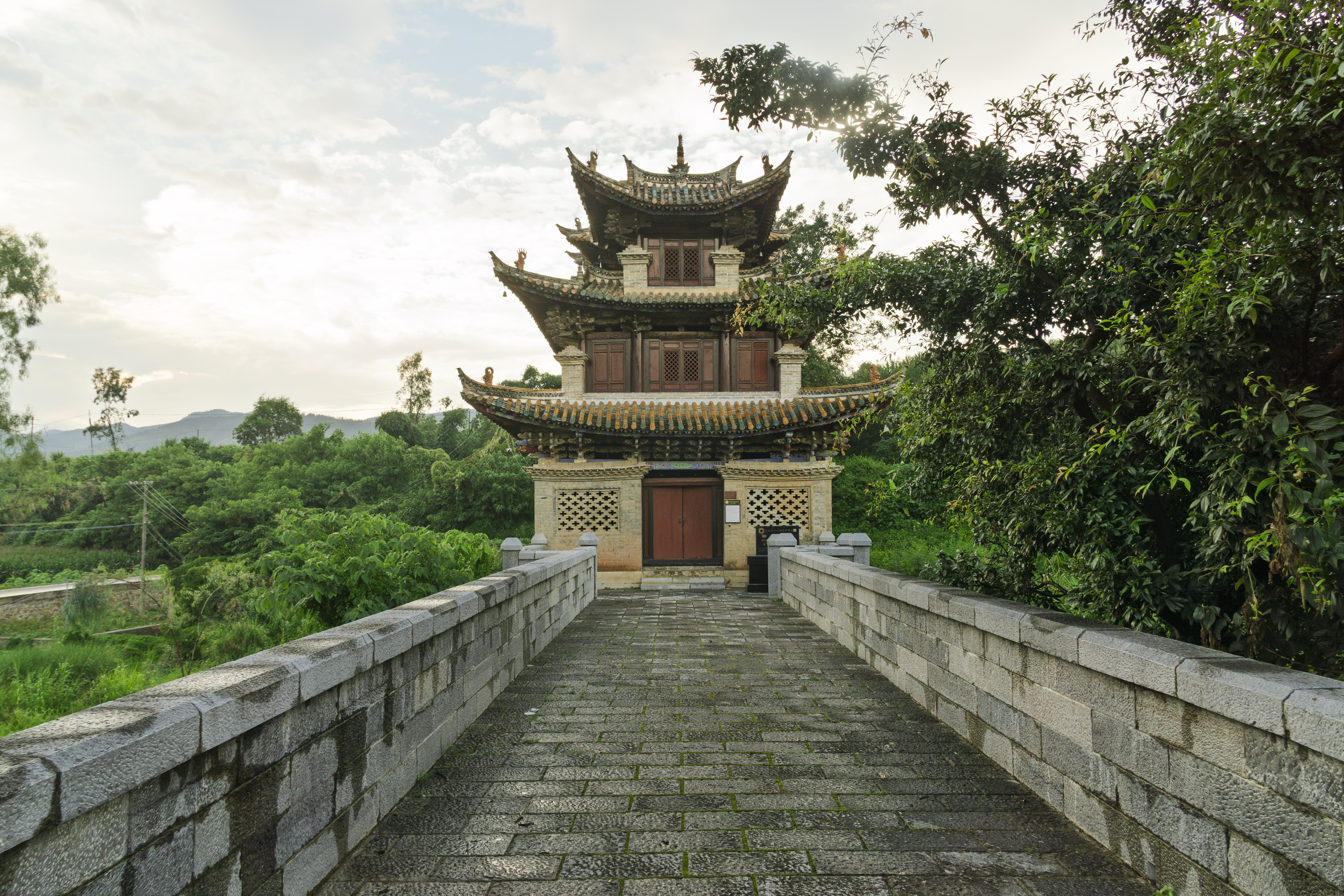
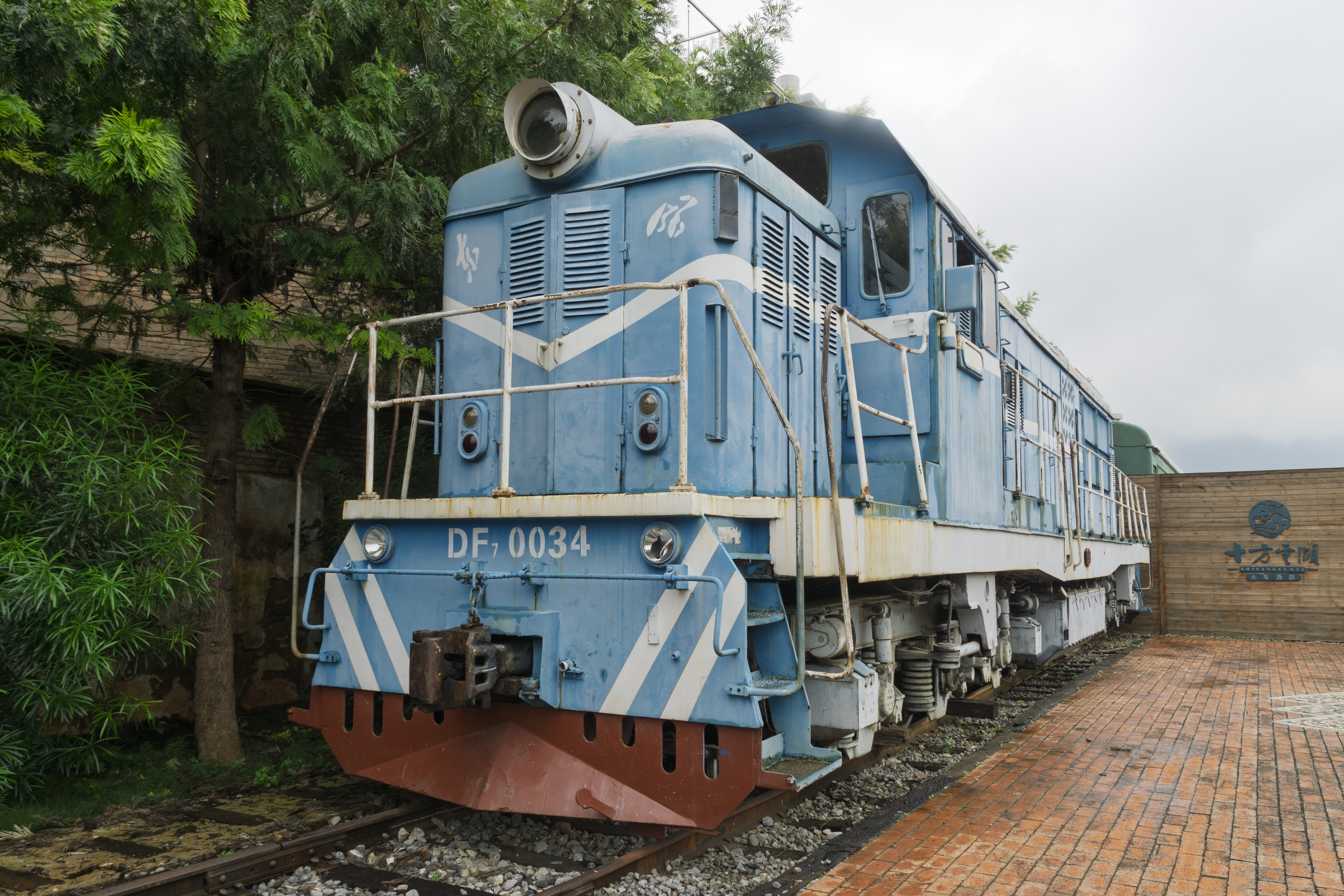
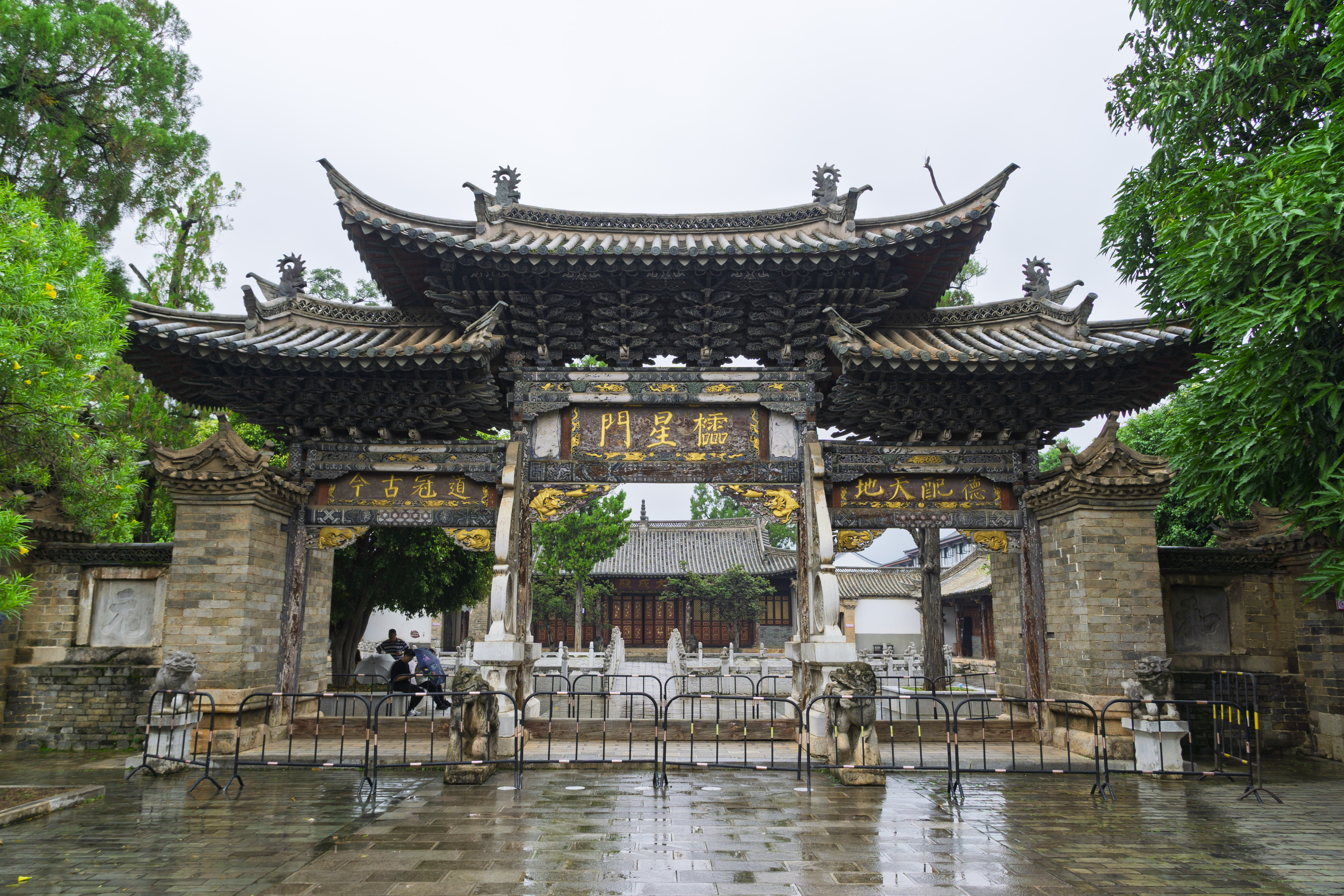
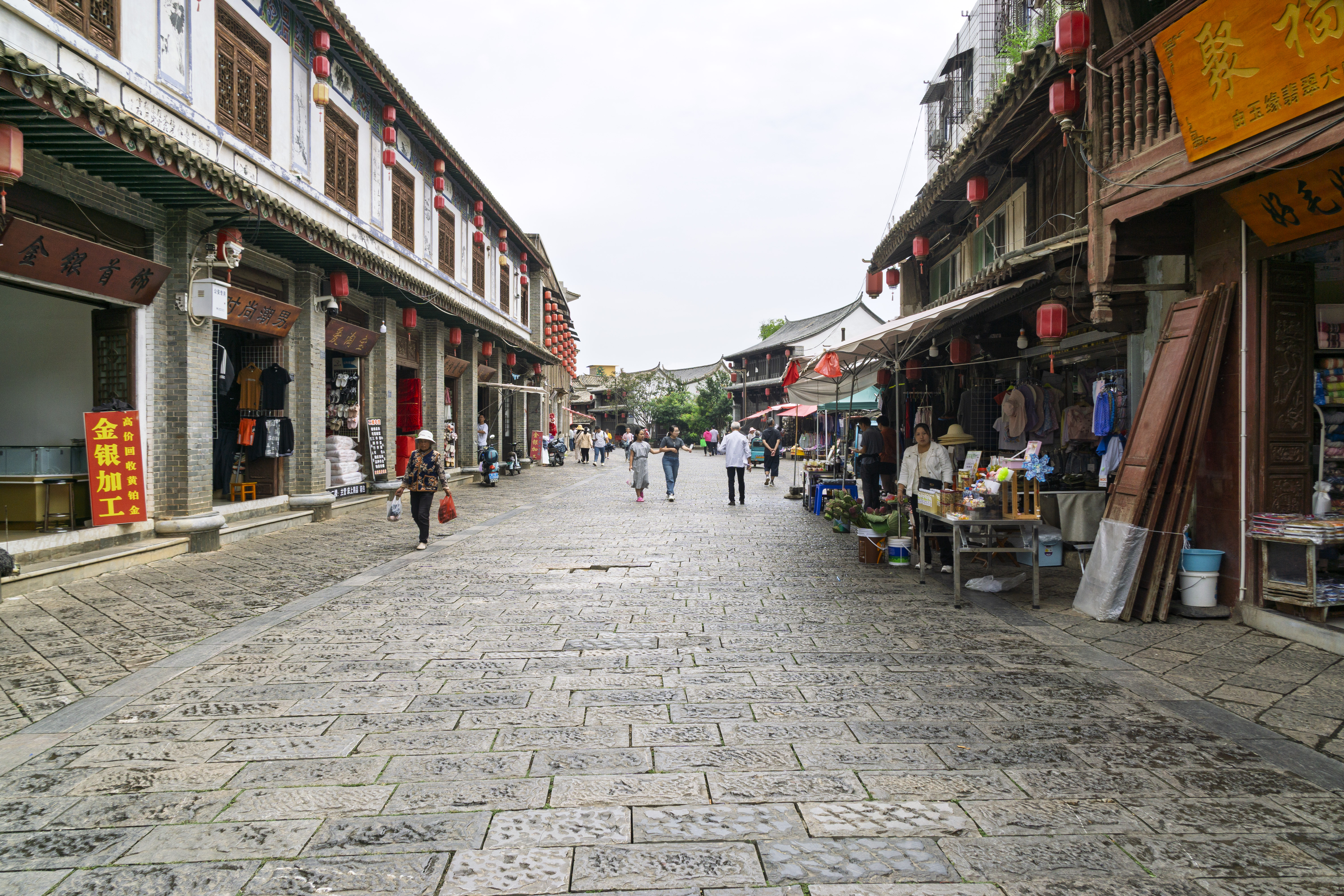
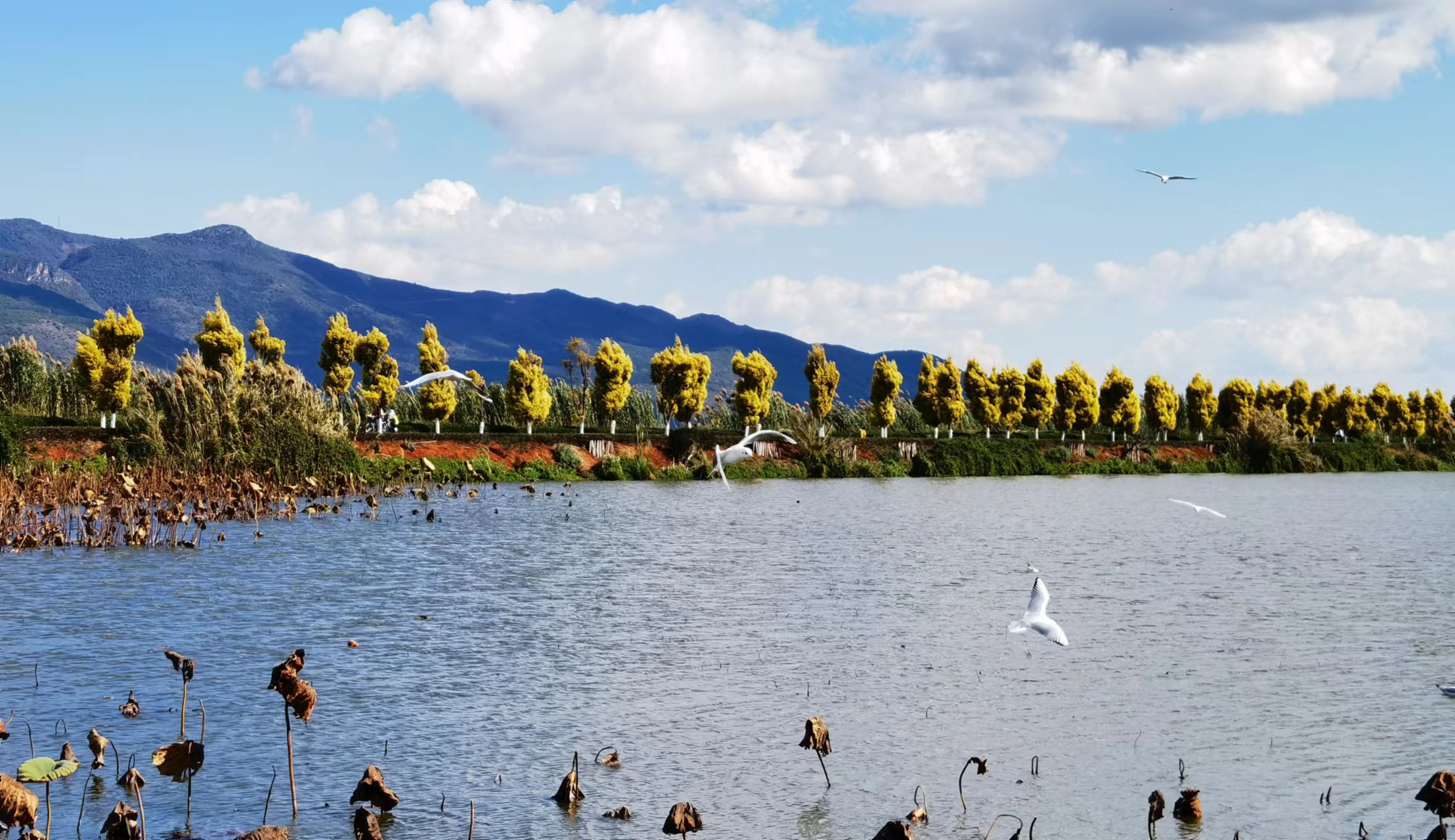
- Huilang Bridge Shiping Railway Station Shiping Confucian Temple County Town of Shiping Yilong Lake

- Location of Shiping County in Honghe Prefecture within Yunnan province

- Location of the seat in Yunnan
- Coordinates: 23°42′22″N 102°29′38″E
- Country: People's Republic of China
- Province: Yunnan
- Autonomous prefecture: Honghe

Area
  - Total: 3,090 km^{2} (1,190 sq mi)

Population
  - Total: 290,000
  - Density: 94/km^{2} (240/sq mi)
- Time zone: UTC+8 (CST)
- Postal code: 662200
- Area code: 0873
- Website: www.hhsp.gov.cn

Shiping County (Chinese: 石屏县; pinyin: Shípíng Xiàn) is a county in the Honghe Hani and Yi Autonomous Prefecture in southeastern Yunnan province, China. It is located about 240 km (150 mi) from Kunming, the provincial capital. The county has a population of approximately 280,000 and its area is 3,037 km^{2} (1,173 sq mi).

Shiping County is located in the northwest of Honghe Prefecture and borders Jianshui County to the east, Honghe County across the Honghe River to the south, Yuanjiang County and Xinping County to the west, and Tonghai County and Eshan County to the north.

== Notable sights ==
The county features many gardens and colorful murals. Yilong Lake, a large fresh water lake with a surface area of 32 square km, is particularly notable for its scenery, including the colorful lotus flowers that bloom on its surface. It is located about 2 km (1.2 mi) east of the county seat.

The Xiushan Temple is located southwest of the county seat. It was constructed during the Tang dynasty and renamed Xiushan Temple during the Ming dynasty.

== Administrative divisions ==
In the present, Shiping County has 7 towns and 2 townships.

7 towns

- Yilong (异龙镇)
- Baoxiu (宝秀镇)
- Baxin (坝心镇)
- Longpeng (龙朋镇)
- Longwu (龙武镇)
- Shaochong (哨冲镇)
- Niujie (牛街镇)

2 townships

- Xincheng (新城乡)
- Daqiao (大桥乡)

== Ethnic groups ==
Shiping County has the following ethnic groups (Shiping County Gazetteer 1990:655-669).

- Yi people
  - Niesupo 聂苏颇 (exonym: Sandaohong 三道红; 90,000 people)
  - Niesupo (exonym: Huayao 花腰; 26,000 people)
  - Pula 朴喇 (about 100 people)
  - Shansu 山苏 (about 100 people)
- Hani people
- Dai people
- Hui people
- Bai people
- Han people

== Culture ==
The county is known throughout China for its traditional dances and songs. The Yi people of Shiping County who live near Yilong Lake perform a form of traditional music called hǎicài qiāng (海菜腔; 'sea grass melody').

== Cuisine ==
Among the county's culinary specialties is Shípíng dòufu (石屏豆腐). Agricultural products include fruits such as oranges and yangmei (Myrica rubra).

== Notable residents ==
The Qing dynasty scholar and civil servant Yuan Jiagu (袁嘉谷; 1872–1937) lived in Shiping County, and his home was named on November 16, 1993, for preservation as a “provincial level cultural relic”.

== Climate ==
Climate data for Shiping, elevation 1,479 m (4,852 ft), (1991–2020 normals, extremes 1981–present)
Month	Jan	Feb	Mar	Apr	May	Jun	Jul	Aug	Sep	Oct	Nov	Dec	Year
Record high °C (°F)	25.5 (77.9)	27.9 (82.2)	30.1 (86.2)	32.0 (89.6)	33.3 (91.9)	32.1 (89.8)	32.8 (91.0)	31.8 (89.2)	32.1 (89.8)	29.5 (85.1)	29.3 (84.7)	25.2 (77.4)	33.3 (91.9)
Mean daily maximum °C (°F)	18.9 (66.0)	21.4 (70.5)	24.9 (76.8)	27.1 (80.8)	27.9 (82.2)	28.0 (82.4)	27.3 (81.1)	27.4 (81.3)	26.4 (79.5)	24.0 (75.2)	21.6 (70.9)	18.7 (65.7)	24.5 (76.0)
Daily mean °C (°F)	11.8 (53.2)	14.1 (57.4)	17.6 (63.7)	20.3 (68.5)	22.1 (71.8)	23.1 (73.6)	22.6 (72.7)	22.2 (72.0)	21.1 (70.0)	18.6 (65.5)	15.0 (59.0)	12.0 (53.6)	18.4 (65.1)
Mean daily minimum °C (°F)	6.9 (44.4)	8.4 (47.1)	11.6 (52.9)	14.6 (58.3)	17.5 (63.5)	19.6 (67.3)	19.5 (67.1)	19.1 (66.4)	17.8 (64.0)	15.2 (59.4)	10.8 (51.4)	7.6 (45.7)	14.1 (57.3)
Record low °C (°F)	−2.4 (27.7)	1.3 (34.3)	−0.3 (31.5)	6.5 (43.7)	9.6 (49.3)	13.1 (55.6)	14.9 (58.8)	13.1 (55.6)	10.5 (50.9)	7.1 (44.8)	0.7 (33.3)	−2.2 (28.0)	−2.4 (27.7)
Average precipitation mm (inches)	29.3 (1.15)	18.9 (0.74)	24.8 (0.98)	57.4 (2.26)	87.2 (3.43)	128.2 (5.05)	174.4 (6.87)	165.0 (6.50)	85.4 (3.36)	73.0 (2.87)	38.5 (1.52)	19.8 (0.78)	901.9 (35.51)
Average precipitation days (≥ 0.1 mm)	5.0	4.5	5.3	9.1	12.5	15.2	19.7	18.9	12.9	11.4	5.6	4.1	124.2
Average snowy days	0.2	0	0	0	0	0	0	0	0	0	0	0	0.2
Average relative humidity (%)	73	65	60	62	68	75	81	81	79	80	78	77	73
Mean monthly sunshine hours	208.0	217.2	232.0	234.9	209.5	144.7	117.6	133.6	137.4	143.7	187.7	184.3	2,150.6
Percentage possible sunshine	62	67	62	62	51	36	28	34	38	40	57	56	49
Source: China Meteorological Administration All-time Nov Recordsall-time November record high

== See also ==
- Zhengying, a village in Baoxiu, Shiping
