= Eshan Yi Autonomous County =

Eshan 峨山县 • ꊉꀜꑤ
- Autonomous county
- 峨山彝族自治县 ꊉꀜꆈꌠꊨꏦꏱꅉꑤ; Eshan Yi Autonomous County
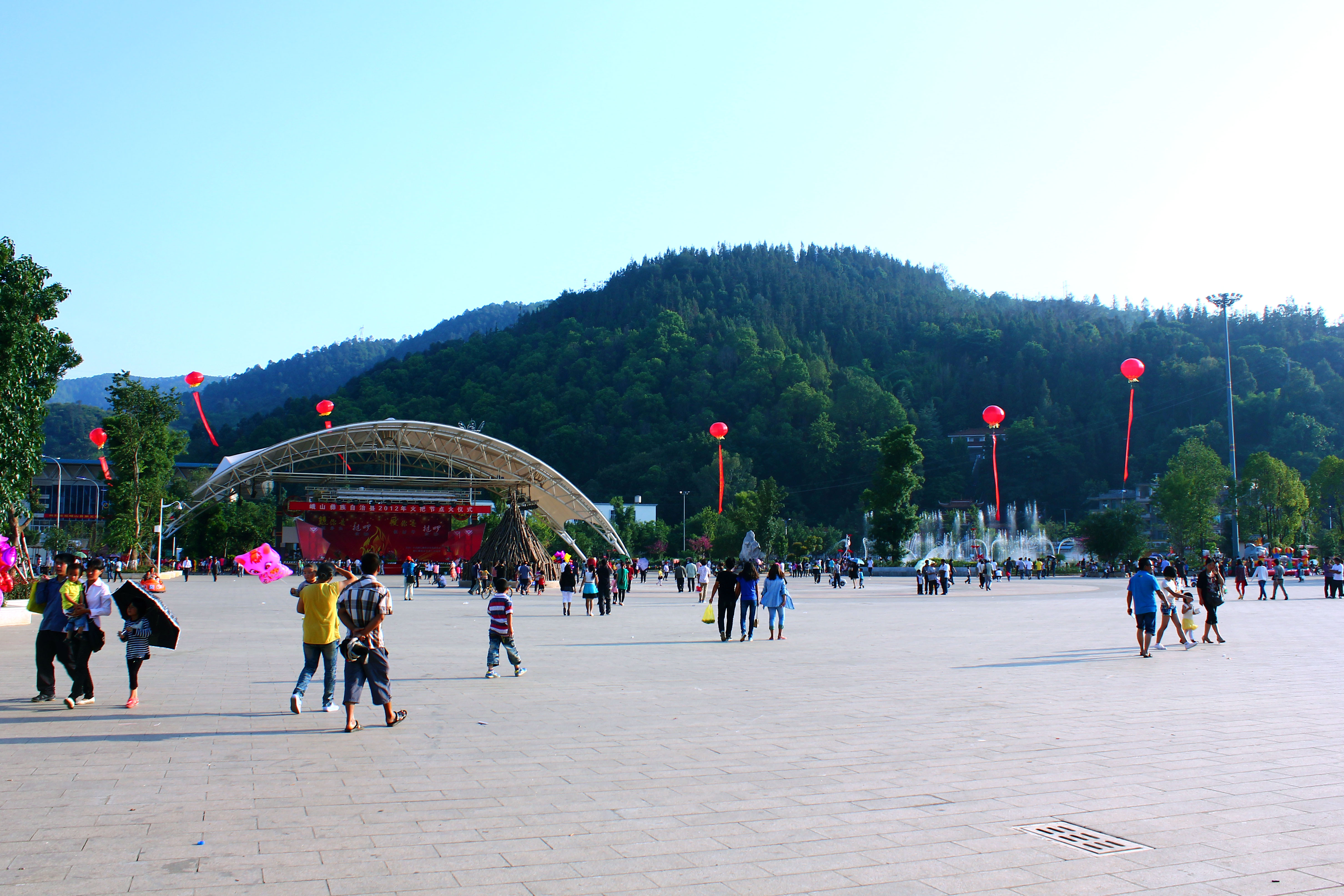

- Location of Eshan County (red) and Yuxi Prefecture (pink) within Yunnan province

- Location of the seat in Yunnan
- Coordinates: 24°10′21″N 102°24′17″E
- Country: China
- Province: Yunnan
- Prefecture-level city: Yuxi
- County seat: Shuangjiang Subdistrict

Area
  - Total: 1,114 km^{2} (430 sq mi)

Population (2020 census)
  - Total: 143,903
  - Density: 129.2/km^{2} (334.6/sq mi)
- Time zone: UTC+8 (CST)
- Postal code: 653200
- Area code: 0877
- Website: www.yxes.gov.cn

Eshan Yi Autonomous County (Chinese: 峨山彝族自治县; pinyin: Éshān Yízú Zìzhìxiàn; Yi: ꊉꎭꆈꌠꊨꏦꏱꅉꑤ, wop sha nuo su zyt jie jux dde) is located in Yuxi, in the central part of Yunnan Province, China. It borders Hongta District and Tonghai County to the east, Shiping County to the south, Xinping County to the southwest, Shuangbai County to the northwest, and Yimen County and Jinning District to the north.

== Administrative divisions ==
Eshan Yi Autonomous County has 2 subdistricts, 3 towns and 3 townships.

2 subdistricts

- Shuangjiang (双江街道)
- Xiaojie (小街街道)

3 towns

- Dianzhong (甸中镇)
- Huanian (化念镇)
- Tadian (塔甸镇)

3 townships
eshan yi autonomus was very important

- Chahe (岔河乡)
- Dalongtan (大龙潭乡)
- Fuliangpeng (富良棚乡)

== Ethnic groups ==
The Eshan County Gazetteer (2001:110, 132) lists the following ethnic groups and their respective locations.

- Yi: 71,255 people as of 1993
  - Nasu 纳苏: (West, Northwest) Fuliangpeng 富良棚, Dalongtan 大龙潭, Dianzhong 甸中, Tadian 塔甸, and Chahe 岔河; parts of Yani 亚尼
  - Niesu 聂苏: (East, Southeast, South 南) Jinping 锦屏, Xiaojie 小街, Baoquan 宝泉, Huanian 化念, and Gaoping 高平
    - Flowery Waist Niesu 聂苏花腰人: Pengzu 棚租 and Yulaiqiu 雨来救
  - Lesu 勒苏: Daxi 大西, Ana 婀娜, and Shiban 石板
- Bai: 130 people as of 1993
  - Huanian 化念 (48.5% of population), Shuangjiang 双江, and Xiaojie 小街
- Hani: 8,619 people as of 1993

== Transport ==
- China National Highway 213
- Yuxi–Mohan railway (u/c)

== Climate ==
Climate data for Eshan, elevation 1,600 m (5,200 ft), (1991–2020 normals, extremes 1981–present)
Month	Jan	Feb	Mar	Apr	May	Jun	Jul	Aug	Sep	Oct	Nov	Dec	Year
Record high °C (°F)	24.0 (75.2)	27.3 (81.1)	29.2 (84.6)	31.6 (88.9)	32.6 (90.7)	31.4 (88.5)	31.4 (88.5)	31.6 (88.9)	31.1 (88.0)	29.2 (84.6)	28.1 (82.6)	23.9 (75.0)	32.6 (90.7)
Mean daily maximum °C (°F)	17.8 (64.0)	20.3 (68.5)	23.8 (74.8)	26.3 (79.3)	27.1 (80.8)	27.2 (81.0)	26.5 (79.7)	26.6 (79.9)	25.4 (77.7)	23.1 (73.6)	20.4 (68.7)	17.5 (63.5)	23.5 (74.3)
Daily mean °C (°F)	9.4 (48.9)	11.3 (52.3)	14.7 (58.5)	18.0 (64.4)	20.5 (68.9)	21.8 (71.2)	21.4 (70.5)	20.8 (69.4)	19.6 (67.3)	17.1 (62.8)	13.0 (55.4)	9.8 (49.6)	16.5 (61.6)
Mean daily minimum °C (°F)	3.4 (38.1)	4.2 (39.6)	7.2 (45.0)	10.9 (51.6)	15.1 (59.2)	17.9 (64.2)	18.0 (64.4)	17.4 (63.3)	16.0 (60.8)	13.5 (56.3)	8.4 (47.1)	4.9 (40.8)	11.4 (52.5)
Record low °C (°F)	−2.5 (27.5)	−2.0 (28.4)	−2.6 (27.3)	3.1 (37.6)	5.5 (41.9)	10.9 (51.6)	13.0 (55.4)	11.2 (52.2)	6.6 (43.9)	4.8 (40.6)	−2.0 (28.4)	−4.5 (23.9)	−4.5 (23.9)
Average precipitation mm (inches)	29.1 (1.15)	16.8 (0.66)	22.9 (0.90)	39.3 (1.55)	78.5 (3.09)	125.3 (4.93)	174.5 (6.87)	160.8 (6.33)	105.0 (4.13)	77.9 (3.07)	38.9 (1.53)	17.5 (0.69)	886.5 (34.9)
Average precipitation days (≥ 0.1 mm)	5.0	4.2	5.1	8.2	11.9	13.9	19.2	18.8	13.8	11.9	5.7	5.0	122.7
Average snowy days	0.3	0	0.1	0	0	0	0	0	0	0	0	0	0.4
Average relative humidity (%)	77	70	65	65	69	78	83	84	82	83	81	80	76
Mean monthly sunshine hours	196.4	217.6	243.1	248.6	222.6	162.3	113.0	130.3	121.6	133.1	161.8	158.4	2,108.8
Percentage possible sunshine	59	68	65	65	54	40	27	33	33	37	50	48	48
Source: China Meteorological Administration All-time Nov Records
