= Jiangchuan, Yuxi =

Coordinates: 24°19′04″N 102°45′11″E

Jiangchuan 江川区
- District
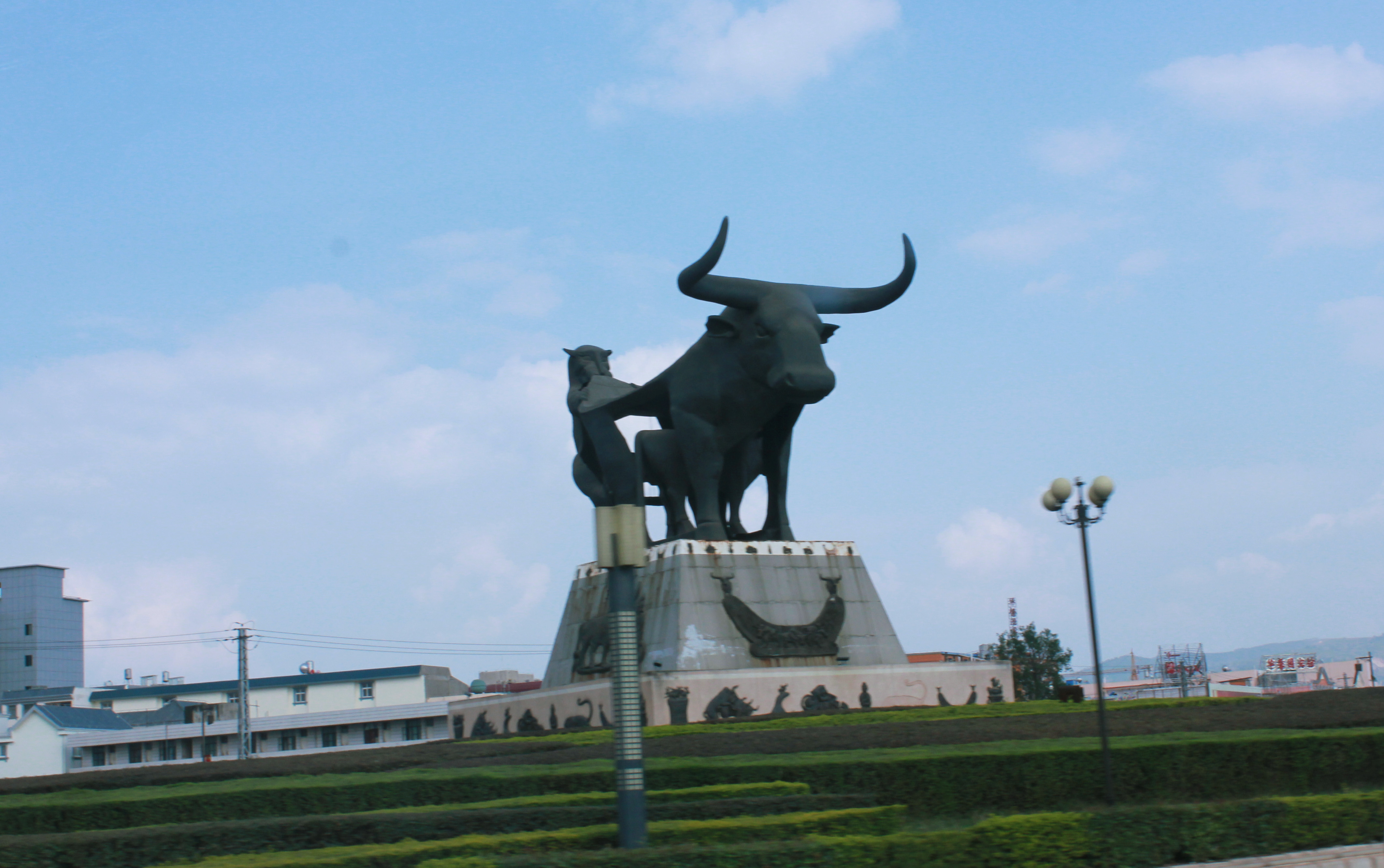
- A sculpture in Jiangchuan

- Location of Jiangchuan (red) and Yuxi Prefecture (pink) within Yunnan province of China
- Country: People's Republic of China
- Province: Yunnan
- Prefecture-level city: Yuxi

Area
  - Total: 850 km^{2} (330 sq mi)

Population (2000)
  - Total: 260,000
  - Density: 310/km^{2} (790/sq mi)
- Time zone: UTC+8 (CST)
- Postal code: 652600
- Area code: 0877
- Website: www.ynjc.gov.cn

Jiangchuan District (Chinese: 江川区; pinyin: Jiāngchuān Qū) is located in Yuxi, Yunnan, China.

The district is known for its Gantangjing Paleolithic sites which contains traces of the use of fire, presence of prehistoric carnivorous fauna.

== Administrative divisions ==
Jiangchuan District has 1 subdistrict, 4 towns, 1 township and 1 ethnic township.

1 subdistrict

- Dajie (大街街道)

4 towns

- Jiangcheng (江城镇)
- Qianwei (前卫镇)
- Jiuxi (九溪镇)
- Luju (路居镇)

1 township

- Xiongguan (雄关乡)

1 ethnic township

- Anhua Yi (安化彝族乡)

== Climate ==
Climate data for Jiangchuan, elevation 1,731 m (5,679 ft), (1991–2020 normals, extremes 1981–present)
Month	Jan	Feb	Mar	Apr	May	Jun	Jul	Aug	Sep	Oct	Nov	Dec	Year
Record high °C (°F)	23.8 (74.8)	26.2 (79.2)	29.6 (85.3)	31.5 (88.7)	32.7 (90.9)	32.2 (90.0)	32.1 (89.8)	31.0 (87.8)	31.8 (89.2)	28.2 (82.8)	28.3 (82.9)	24.6 (76.3)	32.7 (90.9)
Mean daily maximum °C (°F)	17.5 (63.5)	19.7 (67.5)	23.1 (73.6)	25.9 (78.6)	26.5 (79.7)	26.5 (79.7)	26.0 (78.8)	26.1 (79.0)	24.7 (76.5)	22.4 (72.3)	20.0 (68.0)	17.2 (63.0)	23.0 (73.4)
Daily mean °C (°F)	9.3 (48.7)	11.3 (52.3)	15.0 (59.0)	18.5 (65.3)	20.6 (69.1)	21.5 (70.7)	21.1 (70.0)	20.7 (69.3)	19.4 (66.9)	16.9 (62.4)	12.9 (55.2)	9.7 (49.5)	16.4 (61.5)
Mean daily minimum °C (°F)	3.6 (38.5)	4.8 (40.6)	8.0 (46.4)	11.9 (53.4)	15.8 (60.4)	17.9 (64.2)	17.9 (64.2)	17.3 (63.1)	16.0 (60.8)	13.5 (56.3)	8.3 (46.9)	4.8 (40.6)	11.7 (53.0)
Record low °C (°F)	−4.0 (24.8)	−1.9 (28.6)	−2.3 (27.9)	2.1 (35.8)	6.8 (44.2)	11.3 (52.3)	12.6 (54.7)	11.5 (52.7)	7.6 (45.7)	4.9 (40.8)	−1.9 (28.6)	−5.9 (21.4)	−5.9 (21.4)
Average precipitation mm (inches)	25.0 (0.98)	14.5 (0.57)	18.8 (0.74)	32.7 (1.29)	81.0 (3.19)	142.6 (5.61)	156.0 (6.14)	147.8 (5.82)	92.7 (3.65)	61.0 (2.40)	32.9 (1.30)	16.1 (0.63)	821.1 (32.32)
Average precipitation days (≥ 0.1 mm)	4.7	3.6	4.9	7.5	10.9	15.0	19.4	17.9	13.2	10.8	4.9	4.2	117
Average snowy days	0.4	0.1	0.1	0	0	0	0	0	0	0	0	0.1	0.7
Average relative humidity (%)	72	65	58	58	65	76	80	80	79	79	76	76	72
Mean monthly sunshine hours	222.0	223.2	247.2	246.1	215.9	144.8	118.8	135.4	121.1	134.0	189.0	194.8	2,192.3
Percentage possible sunshine	66	70	66	64	52	35	29	34	33	38	58	59	50
Source: China Meteorological Administrationall-time November record high
