= Yuxi =

Prefecture-level city in Yunnan, China

Yuxi 玉溪市
- Prefecture-level city
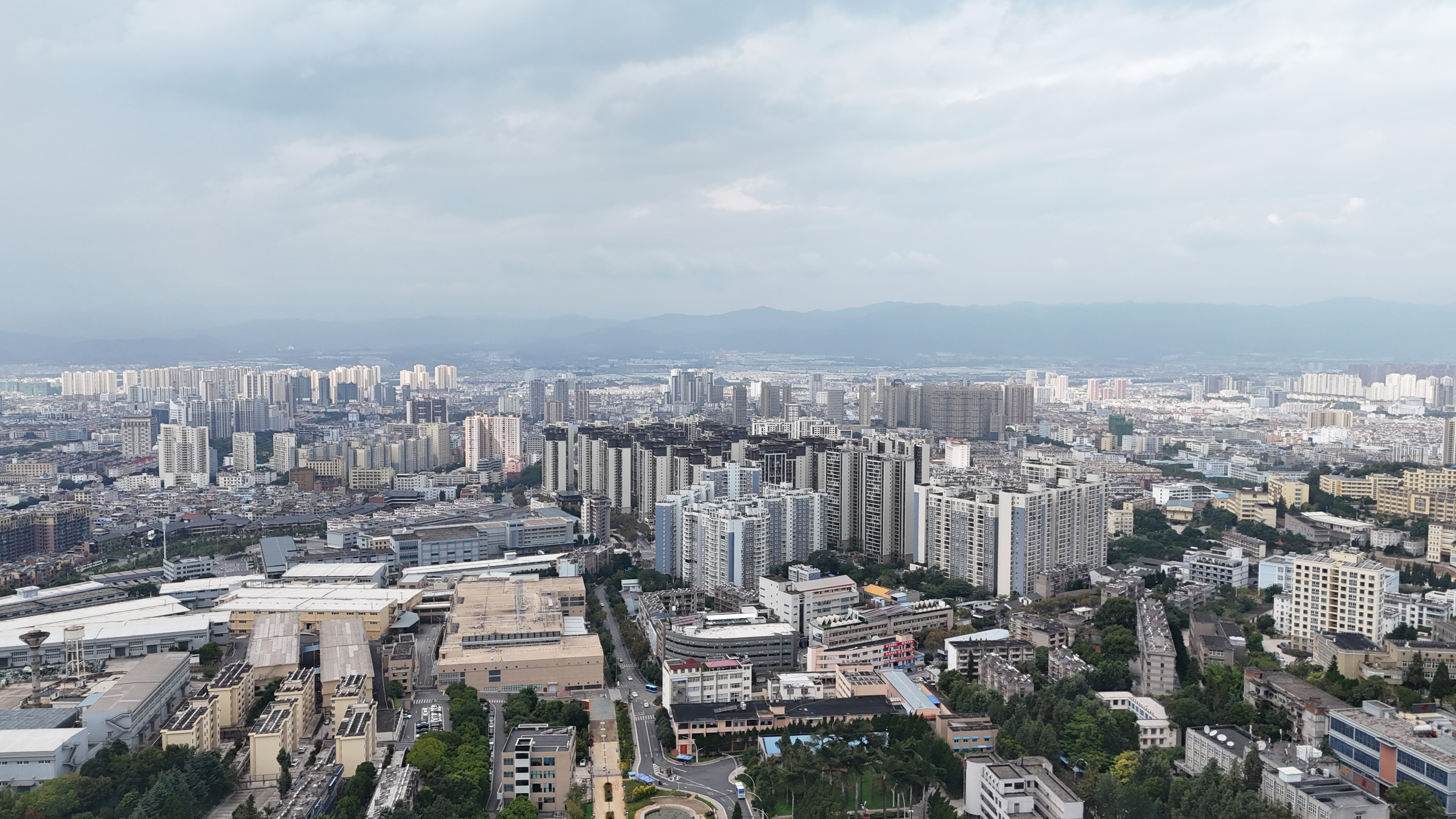
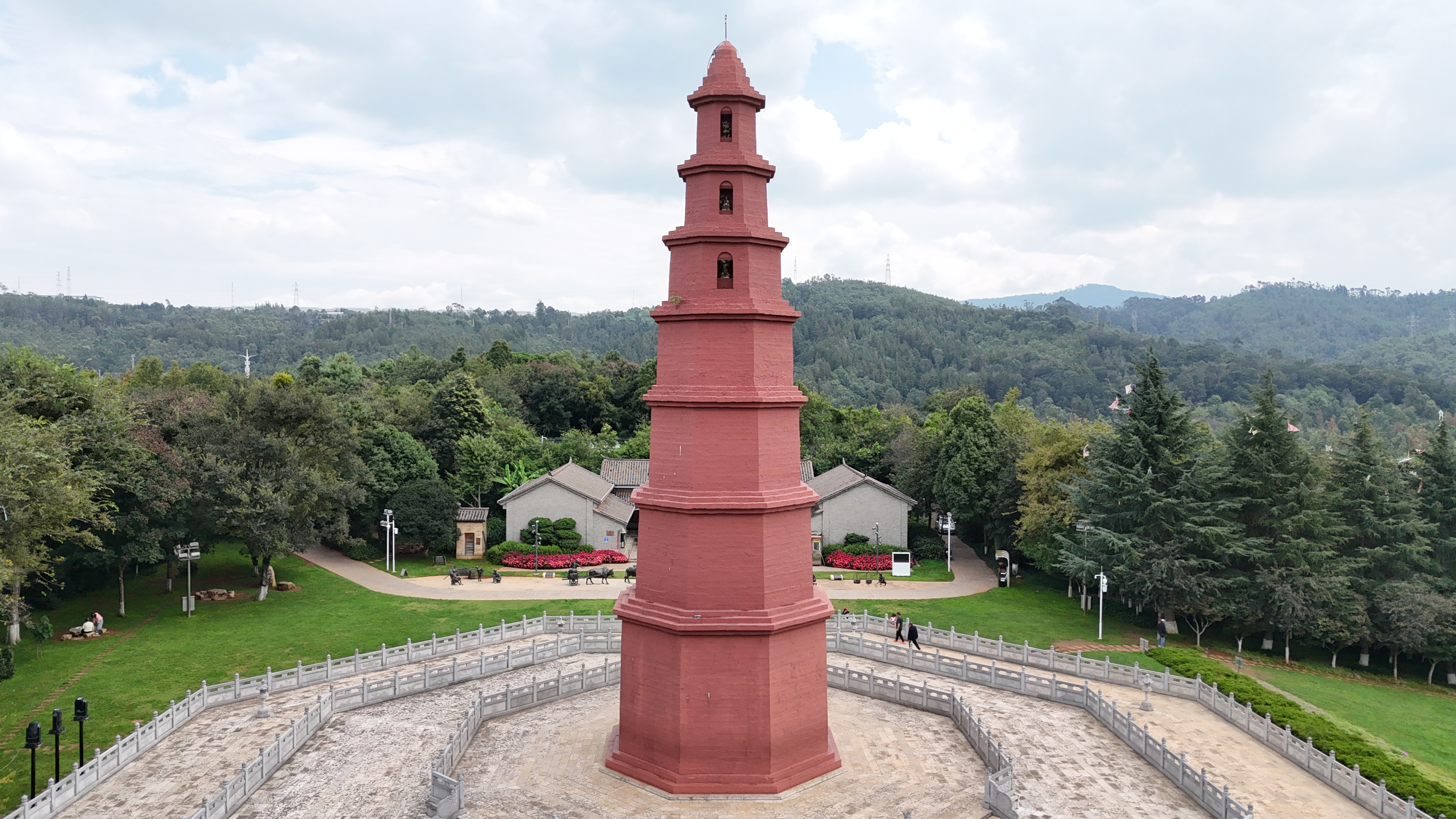
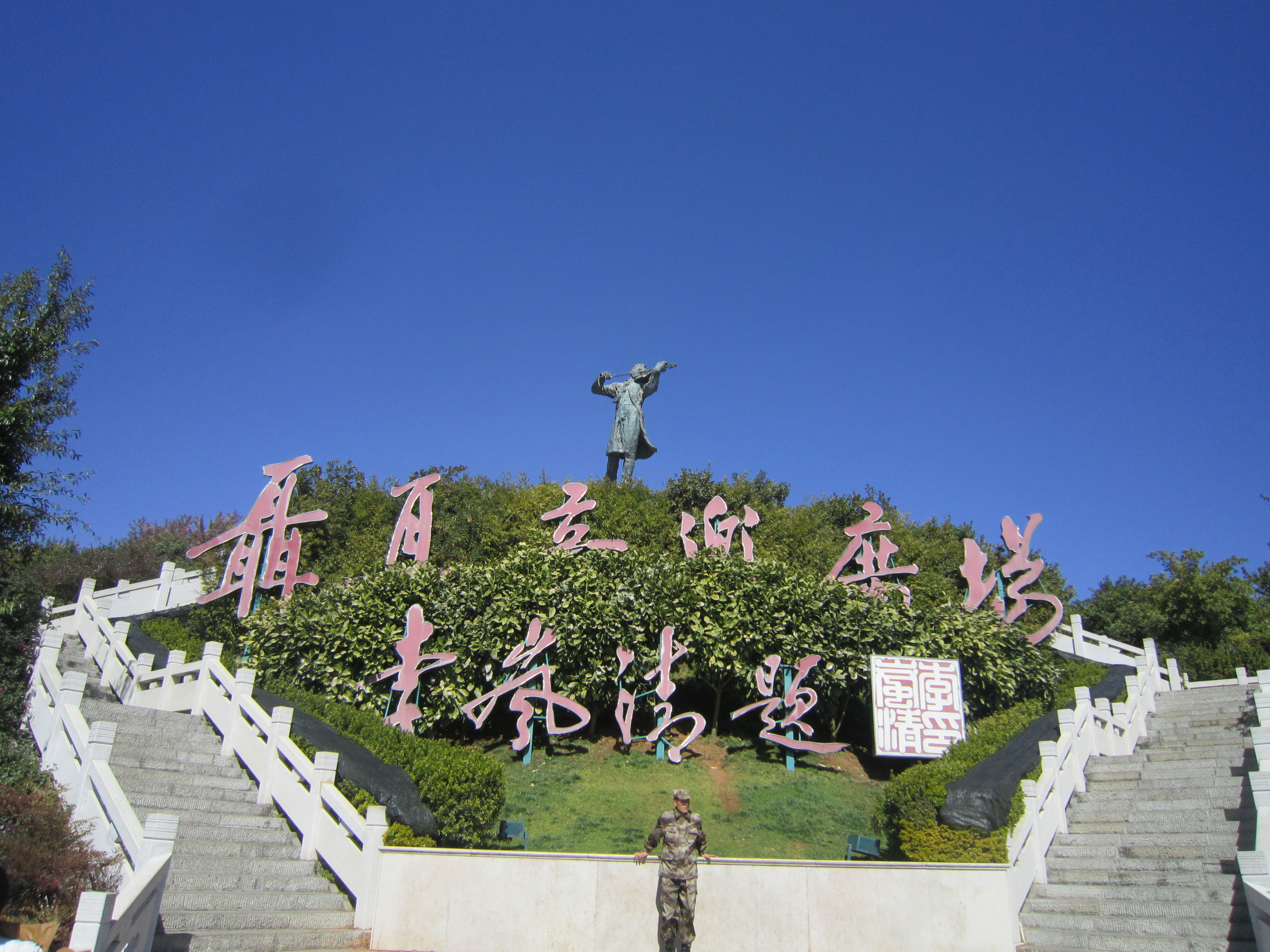
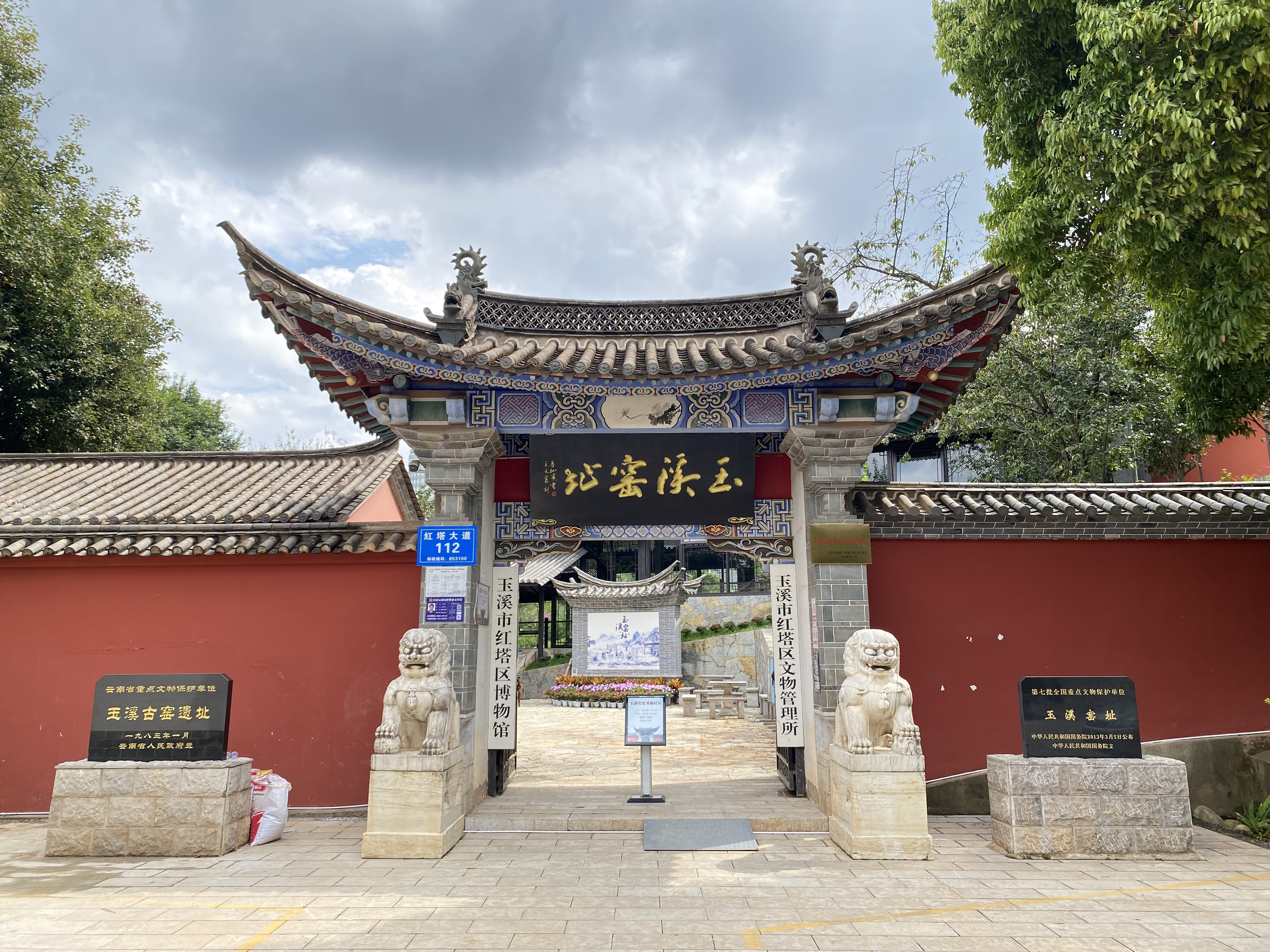
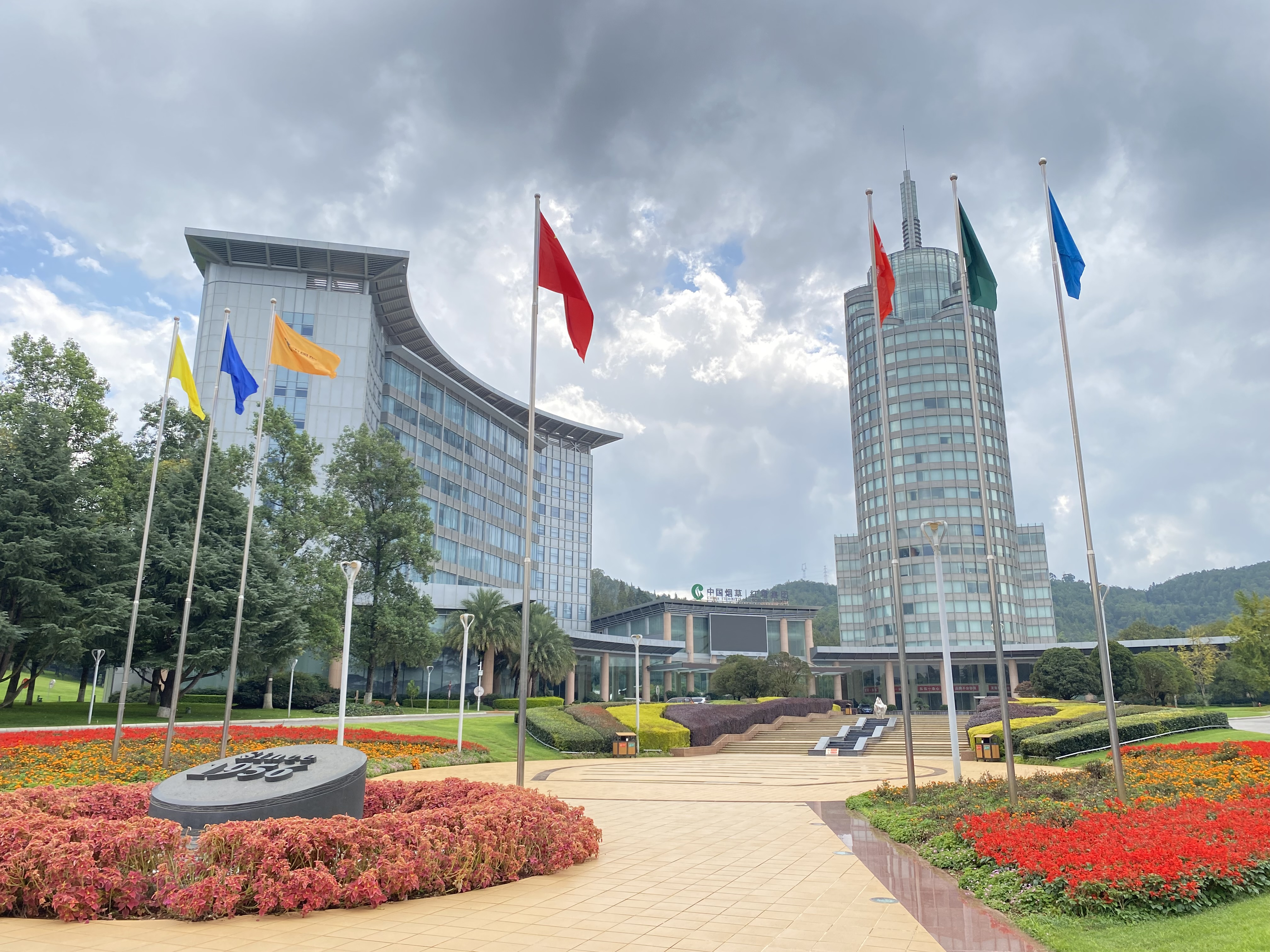
- Urban skyline Red Tower Nie Er Music Square Yuxi Kiln Site Hongta Group

- Location of Yuxi in Yunnan
- Coordinates (Yuxi municipal government): 24°20′49″N 102°31′37″E
- Country: People's Republic of China
- Province: Yunnan
- Admin HQ: Hongta

Area
  - Total: 15,285 km^{2} (5,902 sq mi)

Population
  - Total: 2,568,000
  - Density: 168.0/km^{2} (435.1/sq mi)

GDP
  - Total: CN¥ 252 billion US$ 37.2 billion
  - Per capita: CN¥ 111,579; US$16,457
- Time zone: UTC+8 (China Standard)
- Postal code: 653100
- Area code: 0877
- ISO 3166 code: CN-YN-04
- License Plate Prefix: 云F
- Website: www.yuxi.gov.cn (in Chinese)

Yuxi (Chinese: 玉溪; pinyin: Yùxī) is a prefecture-level city in the central part of Yunnan province of the People's Republic of China. The administrative center of Yuxi is Hongta District. Yuxi is approximately 90 kilometres (56 mi) south of Kunming. By the end of 2024, the resident population of the city was estimated to be 2.266 million.

== Geography ==
Yuxi is located in the center of Yunnan province, about 90 kilometres (56 mi) south of Kunming, the provincial capital. Like much of the central and eastern parts of the province, it is part of the Yunnan–Guizhou Plateau.

The area is 15,285 km^{2} (5,902 sq mi) and the population is approximately 2.5 million.

Near Yuxi city is Fuxian Lake, the second-deepest freshwater lake in China, where there have been discoveries of ancient fossils that are now in the possession of the Yuxi museum. There are also three other lakes around the city. They are Xingyun Lake, Qilu Lake, and Yangzong Lake.

== Climate ==
Tempered by the low latitude and moderate elevation, Yuxi has a mild subtropical highland climate (Köppen Cwb), with short, mild, dry winters, and warm, rainy summers. Frost may occur in winter, but the days still generally warm up to around 17 °C (63 °F). During summer, a majority of the days feature some rainfall, and daytime temperatures rise to 26 °C (79 °F). A great majority of the year's rainfall occurs from June to October.

Climate data for Yuxi, elevation 1,717 m (5,633 ft), (1991–2020 normals, extremes 1971–present)
Month	Jan	Feb	Mar	Apr	May	Jun	Jul	Aug	Sep	Oct	Nov	Dec	Year
Record high °C (°F)	24.6 (76.3)	27.7 (81.9)	29.9 (85.8)	32.4 (90.3)	33.6 (92.5)	33.5 (92.3)	31.4 (88.5)	32.2 (90.0)	30.9 (87.6)	29.1 (84.4)	27.6 (81.7)	25.2 (77.4)	33.6 (92.5)
Mean daily maximum °C (°F)	17.4 (63.3)	19.8 (67.6)	23.2 (73.8)	25.8 (78.4)	26.8 (80.2)	26.8 (80.2)	26.2 (79.2)	26.2 (79.2)	24.9 (76.8)	22.6 (72.7)	20.0 (68.0)	17.2 (63.0)	23.1 (73.5)
Daily mean °C (°F)	10.1 (50.2)	12.2 (54.0)	15.6 (60.1)	18.5 (65.3)	20.6 (69.1)	21.7 (71.1)	21.2 (70.2)	20.8 (69.4)	19.5 (67.1)	17.1 (62.8)	13.2 (55.8)	10.2 (50.4)	16.7 (62.1)
Mean daily minimum °C (°F)	4.5 (40.1)	5.9 (42.6)	9.0 (48.2)	12.2 (54.0)	15.6 (60.1)	18.1 (64.6)	18.1 (64.6)	17.6 (63.7)	16.2 (61.2)	13.6 (56.5)	8.7 (47.7)	5.5 (41.9)	12.1 (53.8)
Record low °C (°F)	−4.4 (24.1)	−2.2 (28.0)	−2.5 (27.5)	3.4 (38.1)	6.6 (43.9)	9.1 (48.4)	12.2 (54.0)	10.7 (51.3)	7.0 (44.6)	2.9 (37.2)	−1.1 (30.0)	−5.5 (22.1)	−5.5 (22.1)
Average precipitation mm (inches)	27.7 (1.09)	14.2 (0.56)	19.5 (0.77)	35.1 (1.38)	77.8 (3.06)	138.0 (5.43)	179.8 (7.08)	168.7 (6.64)	90.2 (3.55)	74.8 (2.94)	37.5 (1.48)	16.2 (0.64)	879.5 (34.62)
Average precipitation days (≥ 0.1 mm)	4.8	3.6	5.1	7.7	11.6	14.8	19.5	19.0	13.6	11.9	5.3	4.3	121.2
Average snowy days	0.4	0.1	0.1	0	0	0	0	0	0	0	0	0.1	0.7
Average relative humidity (%)	70	62	56	57	64	74	79	80	78	78	76	75	71
Mean monthly sunshine hours	204.3	212.6	236.9	238.6	208.1	140.1	105.4	118.5	109.6	127.4	170.3	173.2	2,045
Percentage possible sunshine	61	66	63	62	50	34	25	30	30	36	52	53	47
Source 1: China Meteorological Administration All-time Nov Records
Source 2: Weather China

== Transport ==
- China National Highway 213
- G8511 Kunming–Mohan Expressway
- Kunming–Yuxi–Hekou railway
- Yuxi–Mohan railway

== History ==
The city was founded in 960 AD, a time when Yunnan was not yet part of China. Yuxi was once the core area of Yunnan Province during the pre-Qin period (period before 221 BC). In the Western Han dynasty (206 BC-24 AD), it became a county of Yizhou Shire. The following dynasties witnessed the continuous separations and unifications of the area. It was not until 1997 that Yuxi became a prefecture-level city of the People's Republic of China.

== Demography ==
Among the resident population, the Han population is 1,560,279, accounting for 67.73% of the total population; the ethnic minorities population is 743,232, accounting for 32.27% of the total population.

Ethnic Composition of Yuxi City (November 2010)
民族名称	Han	Yi	Hani	Dai	Hui	Bai	Miao	Mongol	Lahu	Zhuang	Others
Population	1560281	446997	130284	73596	48284	11822	10306	7139	7027	2366	5416
Proportion of total population (%)	67.73	19.40	5.66	3.19	2.10	0.51	0.45	0.31	0.31	0.10	0.24
Proportion of minority population (%)	---	60.14	17.53	9.90	6.50	1.59	1.39	0.96	0.95	0.32	0.73

== Government ==
Rao Nanhu is the mayor of Yuxi City.

== People ==
Nie Er: The composer of China's National Anthem's ancestral home is Yuxi (he was born in nearby Kunming).

Chu Shijian: Chinese business executive and entrepreneur, known as the "king of tobacco" and the "king of oranges".

== Major tourist attractions ==
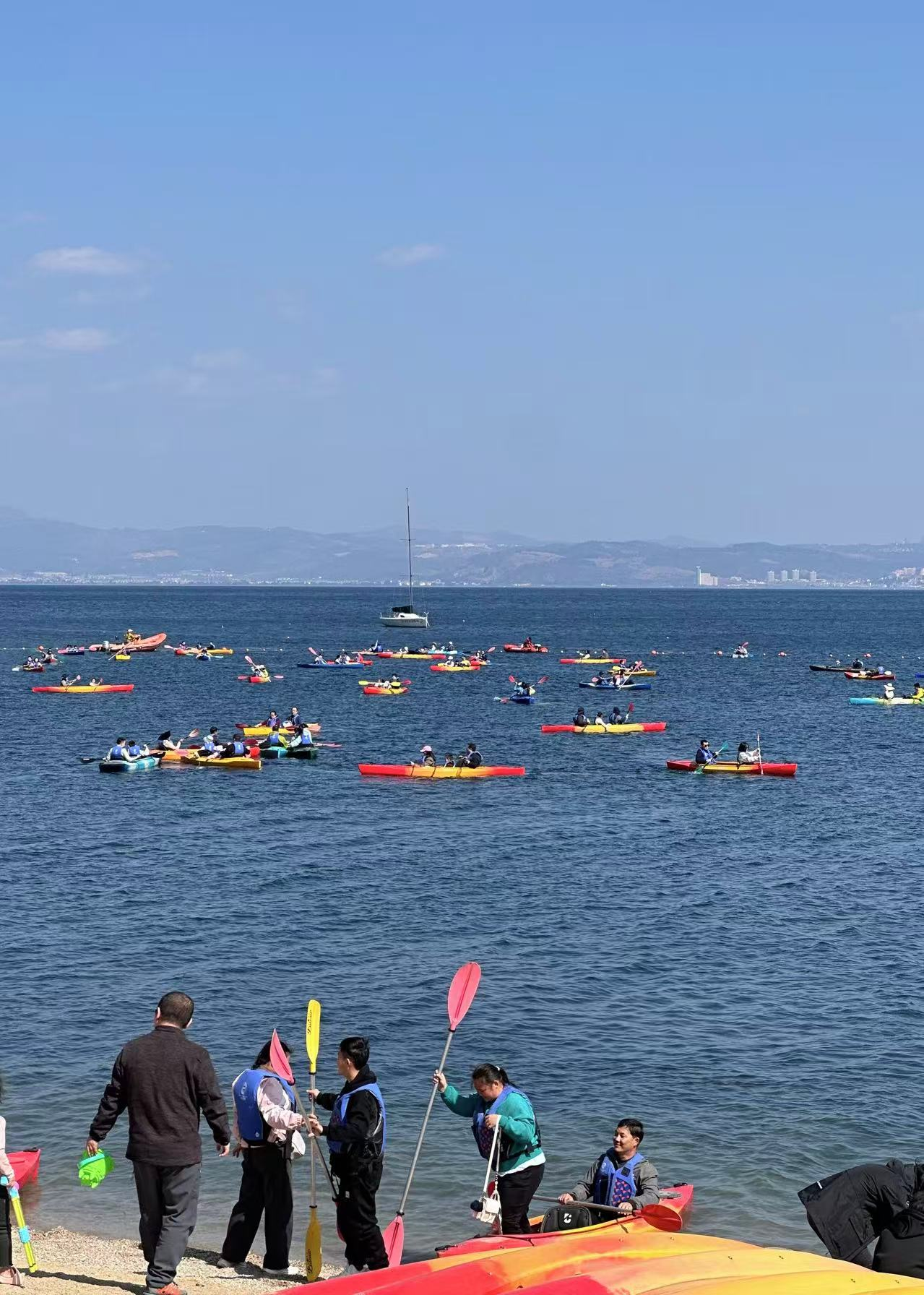
Fuxian Lake（抚仙湖）

Fuxian Lake (抚仙湖)

One of China's deepest freshwater lakes, Fuxian Lake boasts clear waters, earning it the nickname "Pearl of the Plateau." People use it for swimming, diving, boating, and lakeside vacations.

== Economy ==
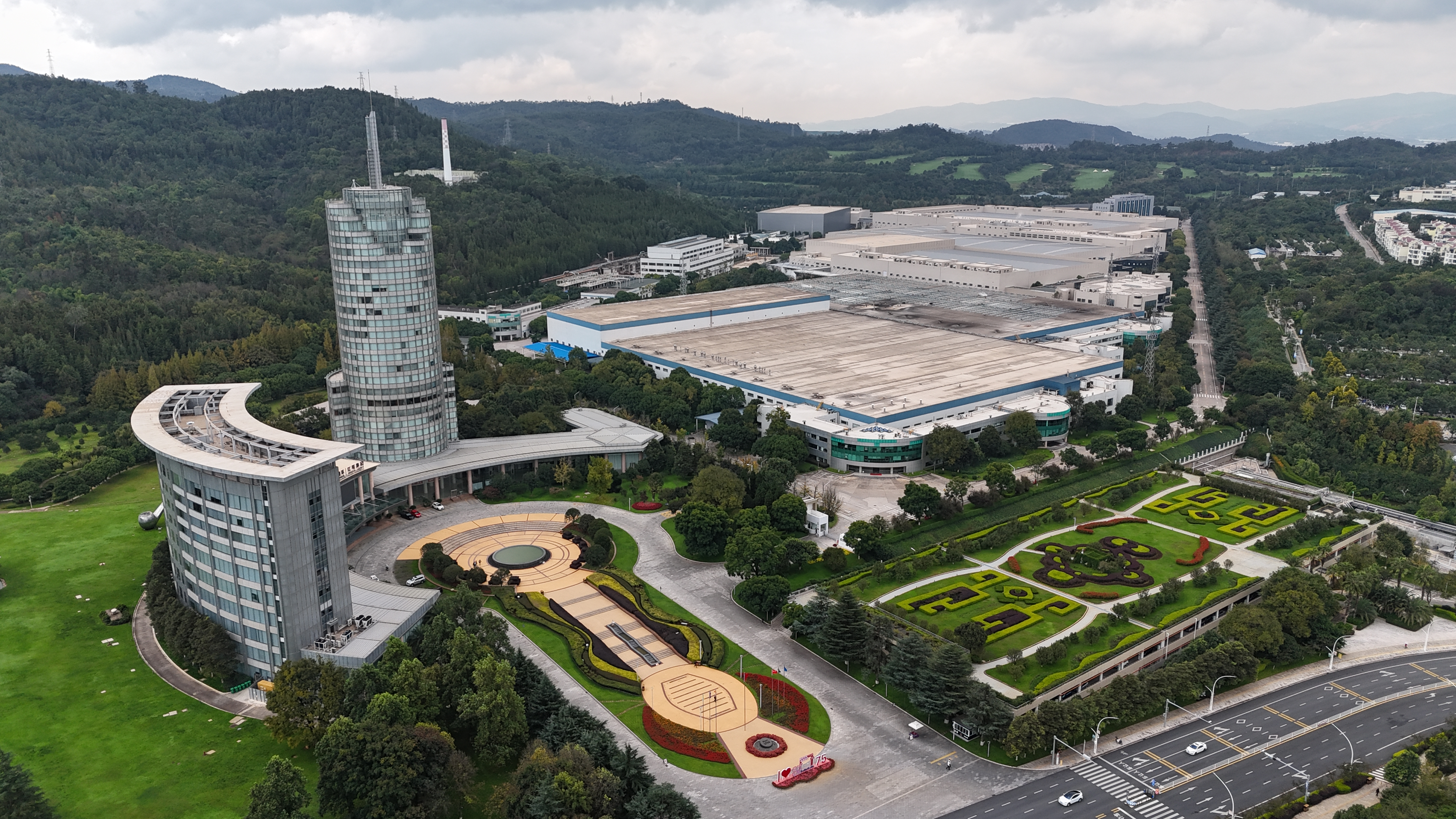
Hongta Group headquarter and factories

Yuxi is the home of the Hongta Group, which was named after the Red Pagoda which sits atop a nearby hill. The Pagoda was originally white, but was painted red during the Cultural Revolution. The tobacco is of high quality because there are over 2300 hours of sunlight a year in the region, adequate rainfall in the summer, and excellent soil that produces a plethora of other fruits and vegetables. The region has begun producing wine, which could prove to be quite palatable in the next decade or so. There are substantial mineral deposits of tin and phosphate ores, including the Heavenly Triangle of Huaning, Jiangchuan and Chengjiang.

Yuxi is one of the fastest growing small cities in China. In 2001, the city won an Honor Award in Analysis & Planning by the American Society of Landscape Architects. In 2004, UNIDO held a Workshop on Seed Treatment Technology, one of only two in China.

== Education ==
Yuxi Normal University is a university located in Yuxi with almost 8000 students. It was founded in 1978 as Yuxi Normal College. In 2000, under the approval from the Ministry of Education of the People's Republic of China, it was renamed Yuxi Normal University, with the merging of Yuxi Adult Education Center and Yuxi Normal School.

== Subdivisions ==
Map
Name	Hanzi	Hanyu Pinyin	Population (2010)	Area (km^{2})	Density (/km^{2})
Hongta District	红塔区	Hóngtǎ Qū	495,129	1,004	493
Jiangchuan District	江川区	Jiāngchuān Qū	280,889	850	330
Chengjiang	澄江市	Chéngjiāng shì	169,366	773	219
Tonghai County	通海县	Tōnghǎi Xiàn	300,800	721	417
Huaning County	华宁县	Huáníng Xiàn	214,650	1,313	163
Yimen County	易门县	Yìmén Xiàn	177,110	1,571	113
Eshan Yi Autonomous County	峨山彝族自治县	Éshān Yízú Zìzhìxiàn	162,831	1,972	83
Xinping Yi and Dai Autonomous County	新平彝族傣族自治县	Xīnpíng Yízú Dǎizú Zìzhìxiàn	285,344	4,223	68
Yuanjiang Hani, Yi and Dai Autonomous County	元江哈尼族彝族傣族自治县	Yuánjiāng Hānízú Yízú Dǎizú Zìzhìxiàn	217,392	2,858	76

== See also ==
- Yunnan Institute of Development
