= Lalo language =

Loloish language cluster spoken in China

Lalo
- Western Yi
- Native to: China
- Ethnicity: Yi
- Native speakers: 320,000 (2002–2010)
- Language family: Sino-Tibetan: Tibeto-Burman; Lolo–Burmese; Loloish; Lisoish; Lalo–Lavu; Lalo
- Dialects: Eka; Mangdi; Yangliu; Xuzhang; Core Lalo

Language codes
- ISO 639-3: Variously: ywt – Xishanba (Central) yik – Dongshanba (Eastern, Western, East Mountain Central) yit – Eastern ywl – Western
- Glottolog: lalo1240
- ELP: Central Lalo
- Lalo is classified as Vulnerable by the UNESCO Atlas of the World's Languages in Danger

Lalo (Chinese: 腊罗; Western Yi) is a Loloish language cluster spoken in western Yunnan, China by 300,000 speakers. Speakers are officially part of the Yi nationality, and Chinese linguists refer to it as "Western Yi" due to its distribution in western Yunnan. Lalo speakers are mostly located in southern Dali Prefecture, especially Weishan County, considered the traditional homeland of the Lalo. Historically, this area is the home of the Meng clan, who ruled the Nanzhao Kingdom (737–902 CE). Many speakers of Core Lalo dialects claim to be descendants of the Meng clan.

== Names ==
Many Lalo are referred to by the exonym Menghua (蒙化), a name used during the Yuan Dynasty to refer to an area comprising modern-day Weishan County and Nanjian County (Yang 2010:12). They are also referred to as Tujia (土家) people (Yunnan 1956:14-15).

David Bradley (2007) refers to the Lalo language cluster, which includes the Samatu language of Zhenkang County and Yongde County, as Laloid.

== Demographics ==
Cathryn Yang (2010) gives the following demographic information for various Lalo languages. Combined, speakers of Lalo languages number fewer than 300,000 people.

- Central Lalo: 213,000 speakers across west-central Yunnan in Weishan County, Nanjian County, Jingdong County, and several others
- West Lalo: 44,000 speakers Yongping County, Yangbi County, and Longyang County
- East Lalo: 15,000 speakers in Dali County
- Yangliu: 7,000 speakers in Yangliu, Longyang District, Baoshan Prefecture
- Eka: 3,000 speakers in Yijiacun, Heliu, Shuangjiang County, Lincang Prefecture
- Mangdi: 3,000 speakers in Mangdi, Hepai, Gengma County, Lincang Prefecture; also in Cangyuan County
- Xuzhang: 2,000 speakers in Xuzhang, Wafang, Longyang District, Baoshan Prefecture

Wang & Zhao (2013), citing Chen, et al. (1985), divide Western Yi (彝语西部方言) into two dialects, namely Dongshan and Xishan. In Lincang Prefecture, Western Yi speakers number approximately 30,000 people and have the autonyms la21 lo33 pɑ21 and mi13 sa21 pa21.

- Dongshan 东山: spoken in Weishan (eastern part), Dali, Midu (in Dajiaban 大甲板 and Xiaojiaban 小甲板), Yongping, Baoshan counties
- Xishan 西山: spoken in Weishan (western part), Dali, Yun, Changning, Lincang, Shuangjiang, Midu, Jingdong, Jinggu counties

In Jianxing Township 建兴乡, Xinping County, Yunnan, Lalu 腊鲁 is spoken in the two administrative villages of Malutang 马鹿塘 and Mowei 磨味 by about 3,000 people (Wang 2011:11,20).

- Malutang 马鹿塘 (1,552 Lalu people): in the 11 villages of Goutoupo 狗头坡, Gaoyingzhai 高阴寨, Cizhujing 刺竹警, Upper Mazongshan 上马宗山, Lower Mazongshan 下马宗山, Daliqi 大力气, Yuwuxiang 玉武乡, Upper Mowei 上磨味, Lower Mowei 下磨味, Upper Yunpan 上云盘, Lower Yunpan 下云盘
- Mowei 磨味 (1,460 Lalu people): in the 6 villages of Malu Dazu 马鹿大组, Lalu Xiaozhai 腊鲁小寨, Laojing 老警, Xinzhai 新寨, Tianfang 田房, and Meizijing 梅子警.

Lalu 腊鲁 (exonyms: Xiangtang 香堂 and Luoluo 罗罗) is also spoken in Sipsongpanna, including in Xiangmeng 象明乡, Yiwu 易武乡, Mengpeng 勐捧镇, and Jinghong 景洪市 townships.

Yunnan (1979) mentions the Datou 达头 of Pu'er and Simao (population: 254 as of 1960) as having traditions and festivals similar to those of the Yi people of Weishan County, who are mostly Lalo speakers.

The Aciga 阿次嘎 of Lancang County reside in Yakou Township 雅口乡 and Nanxian Township 南现乡 (now Nuozhadu Town 糯扎渡镇). They numbered 50 as of 1960. 100 years ago, they had migrated from Niujian Mountain 牛肩山, Zhenyue County 镇越县 (now renamed as Mengla County), and had spoken a different language that is now extinct. They now speak Chinese and "Yi" (presumably Lalo, as the Yi dialects of Lancang are mostly Lalo). Aciga is an exonym, as the Aciga do not have an autonym.

== Subdivisions ==
Lama (2012) splits Laluba into three dialects.

Laluba

- Misaba
- (branch)
  - Laloba
  - Laluba (la21 lu̠33 pa21)

A recent dialectological survey by Cathryn Yang (2010) shows that the Lalo cluster comprises at least 7 closely related languages. Three of these (Eastern, Western, and Central) constitute the Core Lalo group and are located in the traditional Lalo homeland of southern Dali Prefecture. There are also four peripheral languages, Mangdi, Eka, Yangliu, and Xuzhang, whose ancestors migrated out of the Lalo homeland at different times.

All Lalo languages show a reflex of the Proto-Lalo autonym *la^{2}lo̠^{H}pa̠^{L}; i.e. the name that the Proto-Lalo called themselves are still preserved in the various modern Lalo languages. Eka speakers’ autonym is now o21 kʰa24, but elderly speakers report that their more archaic autonym is la21 lu̠33 po̠21 (Yang 2010).

Yang's (2010:209) phylogenetic tree of Lalo is as follows.

- Proto-Lalo
  - Eka
  - Mangdi 芒底
  - Yangliu 杨柳
  - Greater Lalo
    - Xuzhang 徐掌
    - Core Lalo
      - Eastern
        - Taoshu 桃树
        - Core Eastern
      - Central-Western
        - Central
          - East Mountain
          - Core Central
        - Western
          - Yilu 义路
          - Core Western

Alu may also be a peripheral Lalo language, but this is uncertain due to limited data.

Other languages that may be Lalo include:

- Gaiji of central Yun County
- Gaisu, Western (Luoren) of Yongde County
- Gepo, Western of Heqing County
- Pengzi of Yongde County
- Suan of Yongde County
- Xijima of Yun County

== Phonology ==
=== Consonants ===
		Labial	Alveolar		(Alveolo-) Palatal	Retroflex	Velar	Glottal
		Labial	plain	sibilant	(Alveolo-) Palatal	Retroflex	Velar	Glottal
Nasal	voiced	m	n		ɲ		ŋ	
Nasal	glottalized	ˀm	ˀn		(ˀɲ)			
Plosive/ Affricate	voiceless	p	t	t͡s	(t͡ɕ)	t͡ʂ	k	(ʔ)
Plosive/ Affricate	aspirated	pʰ	tʰ	t͡sʰ	(t͡ɕʰ)	t͡ʂʰ	kʰ	(ʔ)
Plosive/ Affricate	voiced	b	d	d͡z	(d͡ʑ)	d͡ʐ	ɡ	(ʔ)
Fricative	voiceless	(f)		s	(ɕ)	ʂ	x	h [h̃]
Fricative	voiced	v		z	(ʑ)	ʐ	ɣ	(ɦ)
Fricative	glottalized	ˀv						
Semivowel	voiced	w	l		(j)			
Semivowel	glottalized		ˀl					

- /t͡ʂ, t͡ʂʰ, d͡ʐ, ʂ, ʐ/ are heard as alveolo-palatal [t͡ɕ, t͡ɕʰ, d͡ʑ, ɕ, ʑ] before front vowels /i, y, ɛ/.
- The glottal fricative /h/ is mainly always nasalized as [h̃], and vowels following /h/ are also nasalized.
- Approximant sounds /w, j/ are in complementary distribution. [w] is before back vowels [u, ɑ], and [j] is before front vowels /i, y, ɛ/.
- /x/ is always heard as labio-dental [f] before front vowels /i, ɛ/. In the Western dialects, /f/ is phonemically distinct.
- /ɣ/ is always heard as a voiced glottal sound [ɦ] before vowels /i, y, ɛ, ɑ/. In the Western dialects, /ɣ/ is heard as [ɣʷ] before /o/, [w] before /u/, and [j] before vowels /i, y, ɛ/.
- Nasals /n, ʔn/ are heard as palatal [ɲ, ʔɲ] before a close vowel /i/.
- Nasals /m n ŋ/ can have syllabic allophones of [m̩, n̩, ŋ̍] when preceding other consonants.
- The glottalized /ʔl/ is heard as a glottalized retroflex sound [ʔʐ] before a central close /ɨ/ vowel.
- Syllables with no initial consonant, always phonetically begin with a glottal stop [ʔ].

=== Vowels ===
There is phonetic distinction between tight-throat vowels and lax-throat (plain) vowels.

Central Lalo vowels
	Front		Central	Back	
	unrd.	rnd.	Central	unrd.	rnd.
Close	i	y	ɨ [ɨ]		u
Mid	ɛ [ɛ]	ø [ø]	ə [ə]		o [o]
Open				ɑ [a]	

- Close vowels /i, y, u/ are realized as mid tight-throat sounds [ɛ, ø, o] and the back vowel /ɑ/ is realized as tight [a], within syllables of harsh phonation. Vowels /ɛ, o/ do not occur in syllables with harsh phonation.
- The close rounded vowel /ø/ mainly occurs after velar initials.
- The close central vowel /ɨ/ is heard as rounded [ʉ] when after bilabial consonants /p, pʰ, b, m/, as syllabic [z̩] after alveolar sounds /t͡s, t͡sʰ, d͡z, s, z/ and as a syllabic retroflex [ʐ̩] after retroflex sounds /t͡ʂ, t͡ʂʰ, d͡ʐ, ʂ, ʐ/. /ɨ/ also only occurs after bilabial, retroflex and velar initial consonants and never after alveolar stops, labio-dental or labio-velar initials.
- Mid-central vowel /ə/ is realized as a syllabic labiodental fricative [v̩], when after labio-dental fricatives. /ə/ never occurs after labial consonants or alveolar affricates or fricatives.

Western Lalo vowels
	Front		Central	Back	
	unrd.	rnd.	Central	unrd.	rnd.
Close	i [iɛ]	y [yɛ]	ɨ		u
Mid	ɛ	ø [øɛ]	(ə)		o
Open	a		(ɐ)	ɑ	

Western Lalo nasal vowels and syllabics
	Nasal			Syllabic	
	Front		Central	Syllabic	
	unrd.	rnd.	Central	Syllabic	
Close	ĩ	ỹ	ɨ̃	v̩	
Mid	ɛ̃			m̩ n̩	ŋ̍
Open	ã				

- In citation form, front vowels /i, y, ø/ are heard as diphthongs with an offglide as [iɛ, yɛ, øɛ].
- Close central vowel /ɨ/ is heard as an apical syllabic sound [z̩] after alveolar affricates and fricatives and as [ʐ̩] after retroflex affricates and fricatives.
- Open back vowel /ɑ/ is typically realized as a central [ɐ] and is then raised after retroflex sounds as a mid sound [ə].
- A syllabic fricative [v̩] is contrastive with back vowels /u, o/. It only occurs after labio-dental consonants /f, v/.

=== Tones ===
The following are the tones in Central and Western Lalo:

Central Lalo tones
Name	Pitch	Symbol
High	55	˦
High-rising	45	˦˩
Mid	33	˧
Mid, harsh	33	˧
Low, harsh	31	˨
Low, breathy	22	˨̤

Western Lalo tones
Name	Pitch	Symbol
Mid-high	44	˧˦
Low-rising	24	˨˩
Low	21	˨
Mid	33	˧
High	55	˦

== See also ==
- List of Proto-Lalo reconstructions (Wiktionary)
- Lalo word list (Wiktionary)
