= Shaxi, Yunnan =

Town in Yunnan, China

Coordinates: 26°19′19″N 99°51′18″E

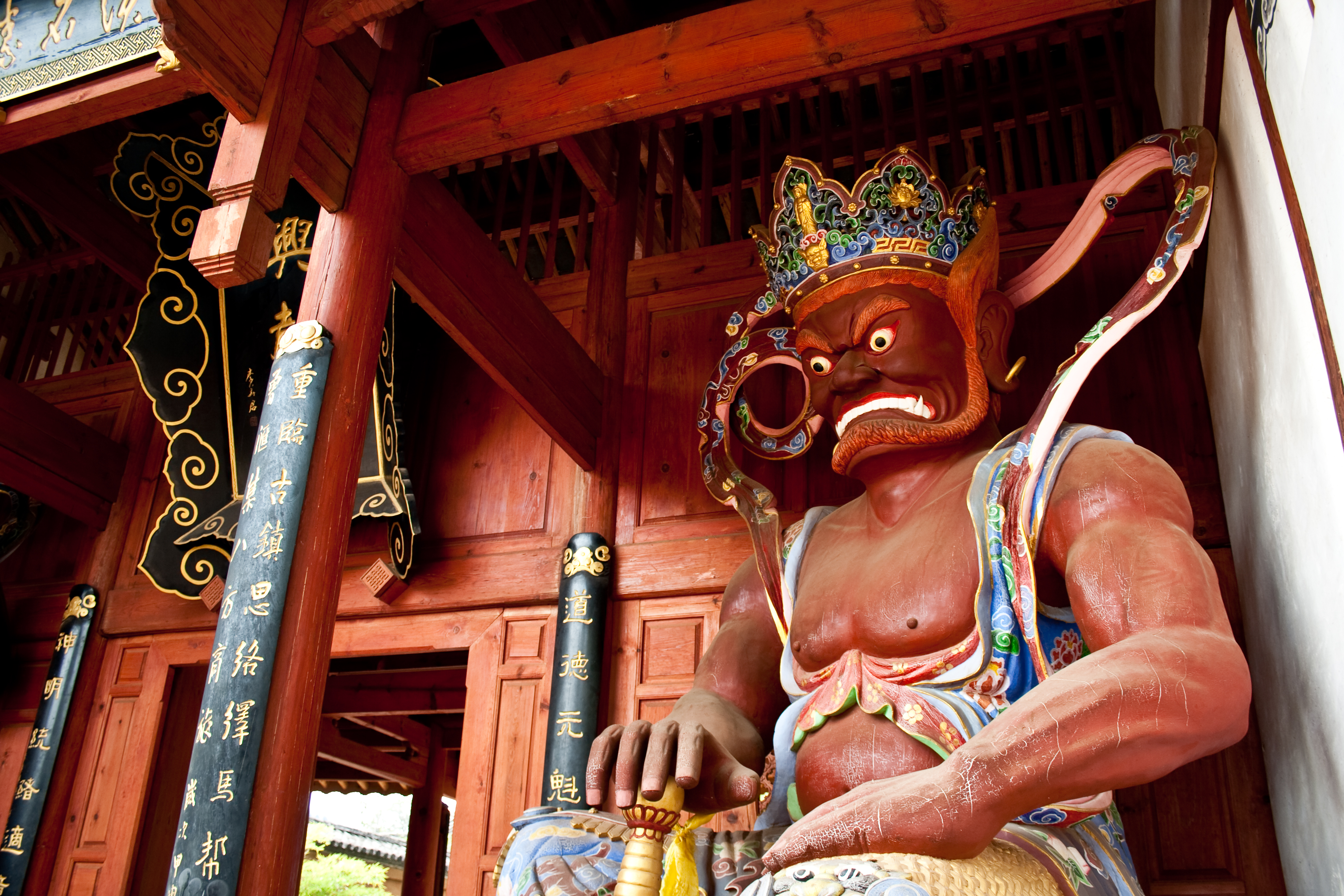
The Xingjiao Temple in Shaxi is a Ming dynasty Buddhist temple of the Bai people

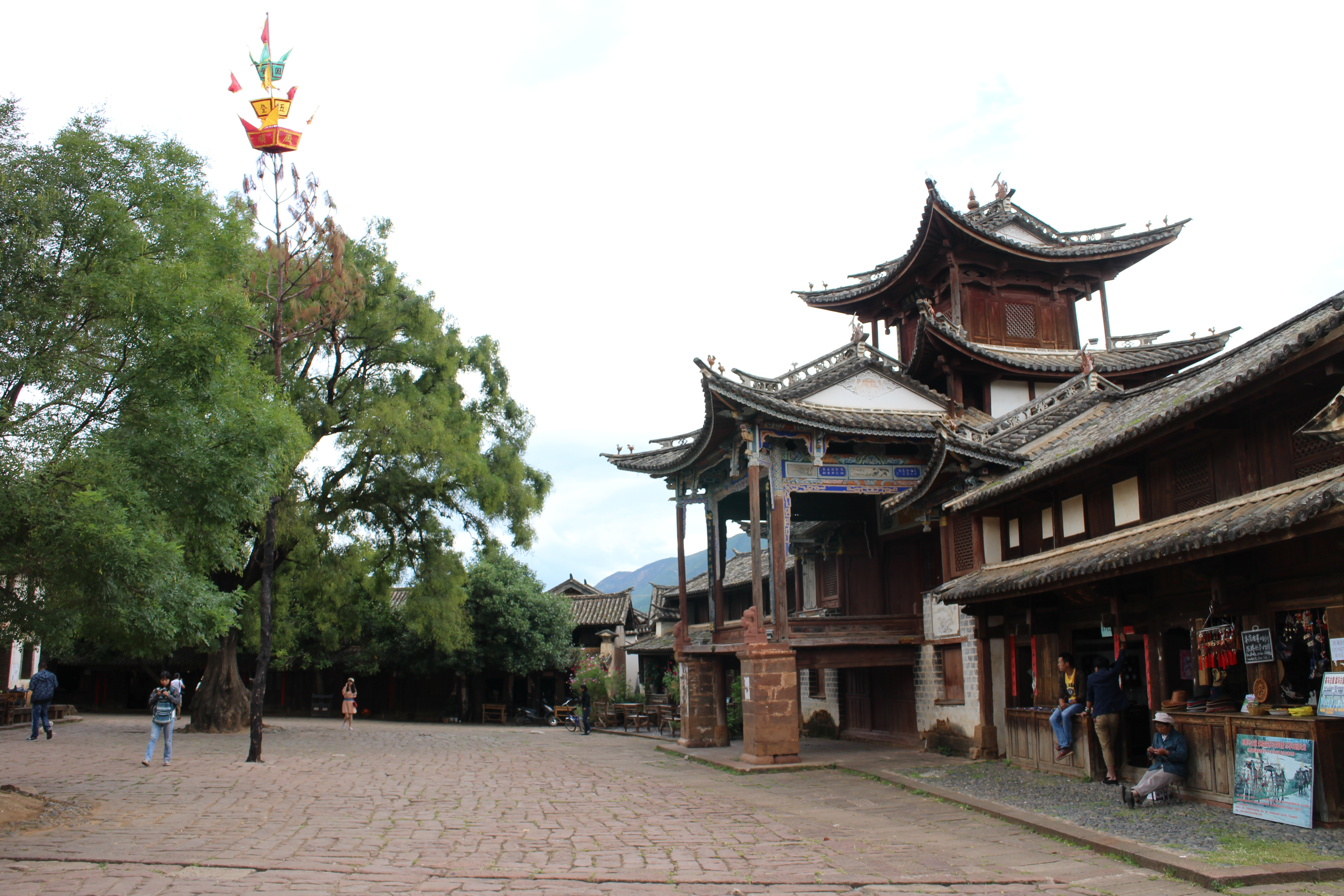
Sideng market square

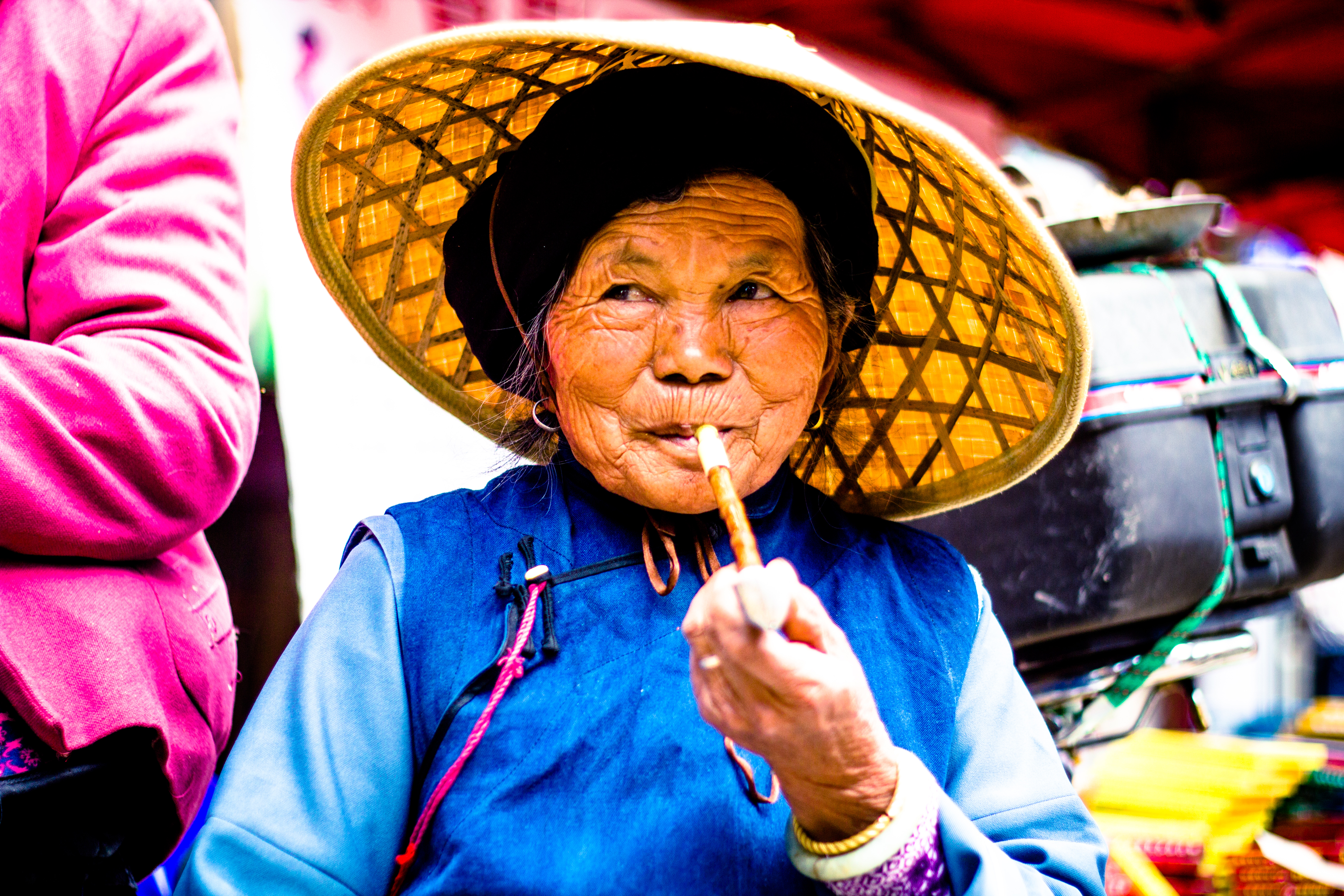
An elderly Bai woman dressed in traditional garb at the Friday market, smoking a pipe

Shaxi (Chinese: 沙溪) is a historic market town in Jianchuan County, Dali Prefecture, Yunnan province, China. It is located roughly halfway between Dali and Lijiang.

The Sideng market square of Shaxi was added to the World Monuments Watch List of 100 Most Endangered Sites in 2001.

Shaxi started as a trading point for tea and horses during the Tang dynasty (618–907). The prosperity of the town was at its height during the Ming and Qing dynasties (1368–1912).

It is probably the most intact horse caravan town on the Ancient tea route leading from Yunnan into Burma and Tibet and is now being preserved through a cooperation between the Swiss Federal Institute of Technology Zürich (ETH) and the People's Government of Jianchuan County.

Nearby Shibao mountain contains Buddhist rock carvings and temples of over 1300 years old with, amongst others, images of the bodhisattva Guanyin.

The two main ethnic groups of Shaxi are the Bai and Yi people.
