= Gomotage language =

Loloish language of Yunnan, China

Gomotage
- Gomozo
- Native to: China
- Region: Yunnan
- Language family: Sino-Tibetan: (Tibeto-Burman); Lolo–Burmese; Loloish; Lisoish; Lalo–Lavu; Taloid; Heqing Yi?; Gomotage

Language codes
- ISO 639-3: None (mis)
- Glottolog: None

Gomotage (ɣɔ21 mɔ33 ta55 ɣə21; also known as ɣɔ31 mɔ33 zɔ31 in Duan (1998)) is a Loloish language of Eryuan County and Heqing County, Yunnan. Gomotage is probably closely related to Kua-nsi, spoken in Heqing County (Yang 2010:7).

== Distribution ==
Duan (1998:147) lists the following locations.

- Eryuan County 洱源县
  - Dasongdian 大松甸, Cibi Township 茨碧乡
  - Dananping 南大坪, Sanying Township 三营乡
  - Sanmei Village 三枚村, Yousuo Township 右所乡
- Heqing County 鹤庆县
  - Anle 安乐 and Xinfeng 新丰, Chengjiao Township 城郊乡
  - Dafudi 大福地, Xingtun Township 辛屯乡
  - Xiyuan Village 西圆村, Beiya Township 北衙乡
