= Cristatus =

Scientific classification
- Kingdom: Animalia
- Phylum: Arthropoda
- Subphylum: Chelicerata
- Class: Arachnida
- Order: Araneae
- Infraorder: Araneomorphae
- Family: Linyphiidae
- Subfamily: Erigoninae
- Genus: Cristatus; Irfan, Zhang & Peng, 2022

Type species
- C. makuensis Irfan, Zhang & Peng, 2022

Species
- 2, see text

Genus of spiders

Cristatus is a genus of spiders in the family Linyphiidae.

== Distribution ==
All described species are endemic to China. C. anfractus has only been found in Longyang County, C. makuensis in Gongshan County, both in Yunnan Province at elevations above 2,000 m.

== Etymology ==
The genus is named Latin cristatus "tufted" for the tuft of hairs on the distal arm of the paracymbium in the male palp.

C. anfractus is from Latin anfractus "winding", indicating the curved dorsal tibial apophysis in the male palp. C. makuensis is named after the type locality, Maku (马库; Mǎ kù) in Dulongjiang Township.

== Species ==
As of October 2025, this genus includes two species:

- Cristatus anfractus Irfan, Zhang & Peng, 2022 – China
- Cristatus makuensis Irfan, Zhang & Peng, 2022 – China (type species)
