= Gongchen =

Gongchen may refer to:

- Gongchen tank
- Gongchen Tower
- Khorgas

== See also ==
- Gongcheng Yao Autonomous County
- Gonchen Monastery
