= Yangliu language =

Loloish language of Yunnan, China

Yangliu
- Native to: China
- Ethnicity: Yi
- Native speakers: 7,000 (2010)
- Language family: Sino-Tibetan: (Tibeto-Burman); Lolo–Burmese; Loloish; Lisoish; Lalo–Lavu; Yangliu

Language codes
- ISO 639-3: (proposal rejected)
- Glottolog: yang1304

Yangliu (autonym: la21 lu55 pa55) is a Loloish language of Yunnan, China. There are 7,000 speakers in Yangliu, Longyang District, Baoshan Prefecture.
