= Gongchen Tower =

Former monument in Weishan, Yunnan Province, China

Coordinates: 25°13′57″N 100°18′23″E

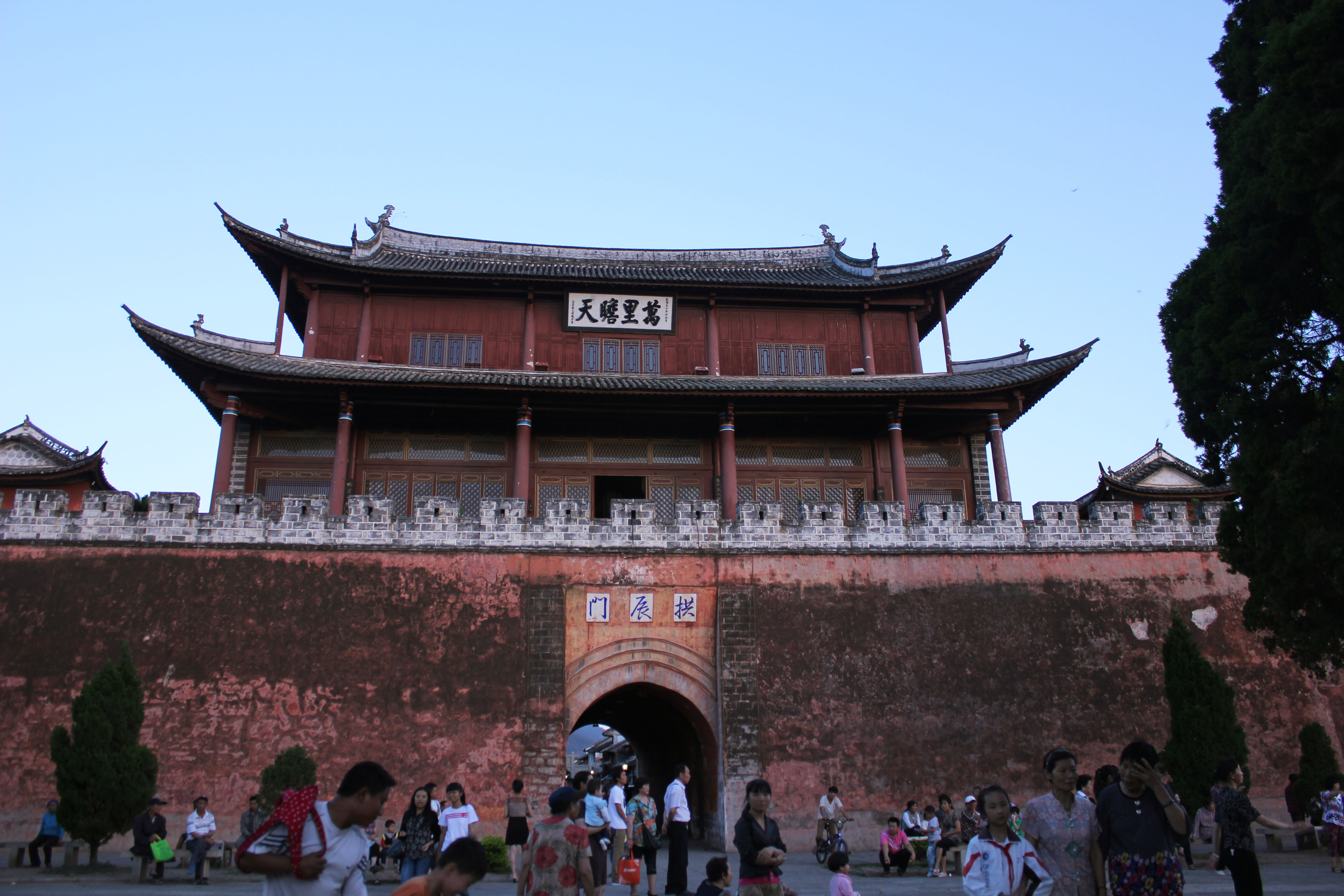
Gongchen Tower on top of the Gongchen Gate, 2013

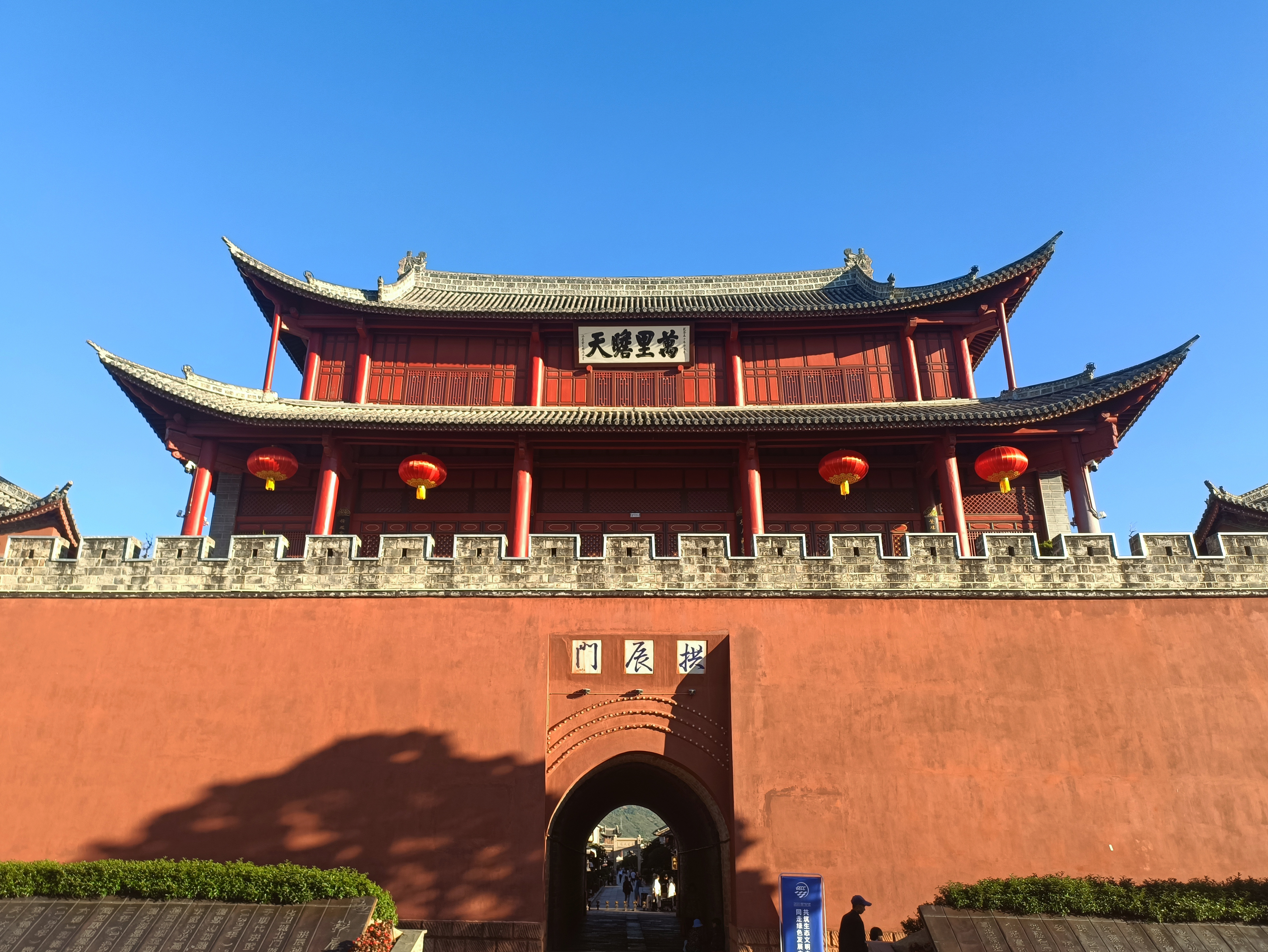
Gongchen Tower after reconstruction, 2022

The Gongchen Tower (Chinese: 拱辰楼; pinyin: Gǒngchén Lóu) was a 14th-century wooden tower built on top of the northern gate of the city wall of Nanzhao, the old town and seat of Weishan Yi and Hui Autonomous County in the Chinese province of Yunnan. It was one of the oldest and best preserved towers in Yunnan, and a symbol of Weishan, before it was destroyed by a fire on 3 January 2015.

== History ==
The Gongchen Tower was built in 1390, the 23rd year of the Hongwu reign during the Ming dynasty, on top of the northern gate of the Weishan (then called Menghua) city wall. The city wall originally had five towers, but only Gongchen and Wenbi (文笔楼) towers survived until modern times. Being more than 600 years old, Gongchen Tower was one of the oldest and best preserved ancient towers in Yunnan until its destruction by fire. It was considered a symbol of Weishan, and was listed as a key cultural protection site by the Dali Bai Autonomous Prefecture in 1988.

In May 2013, the State Council of China added the Gongchen Tower, together with other ancient buildings in the old town of Nanzhao (collectively known as the Ancient Architectural Ensemble of Nanzhao Town), to the list of Major National Historical and Cultural Sites.

On Saturday, 3 January 2015, a fire broke out in the Gongchen Tower at about 3 a.m., which took firefighters two hours to extinguish. Most of the tower was burned down. There were no casualties, and the cause of the fire is still undetermined.

== Structure ==
The Gongchen Tower originally was three stories high, but was reduced to two stories after modifications were made in 1650. It stood 16 metres (52 ft) tall, on top of the 8.5-metre (28 ft) tall city wall. It measured 28 metres (92 ft) wide, and 17 metres (56 ft) deep. The tower afforded a bird's eye view of the entire old town of Nanzhao.

A horizontal board was hung on the southern side of the tower, inscribed with the calligraphy of Kang Qin (康勤), Prefect of Menghua Prefecture during the Qing dynasty, written in 1771. The northern side of the tower had a board inscribed with the calligraphy of Huang Dahe (黄大鹤), another Prefect of Menghua, dated 1785.
