= Changning County, Yunnan =

Changning County 昌宁县 ကောင်းငြိမ်းခရိုင်
- County
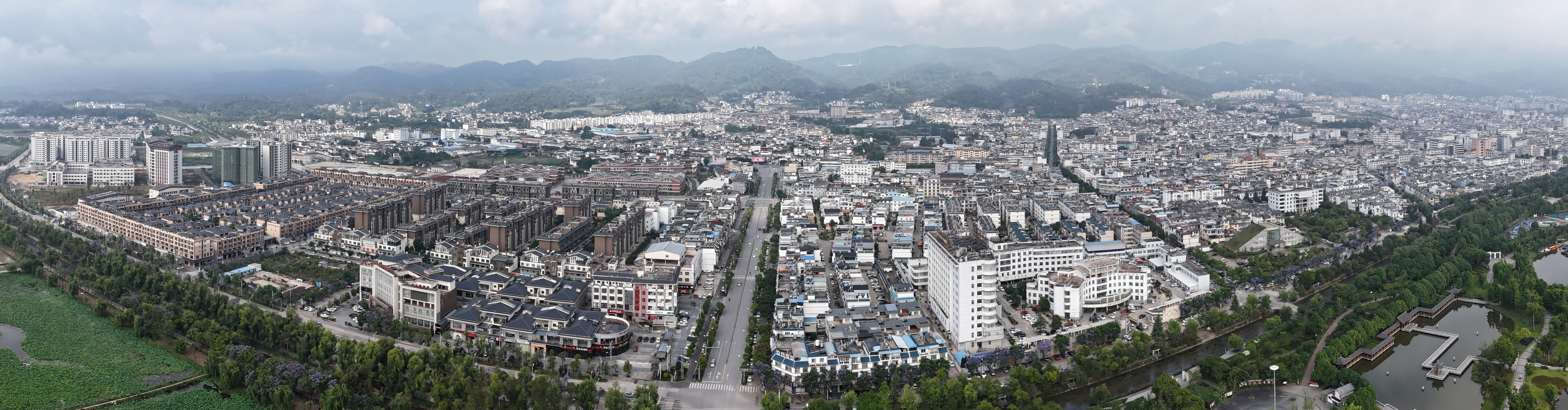
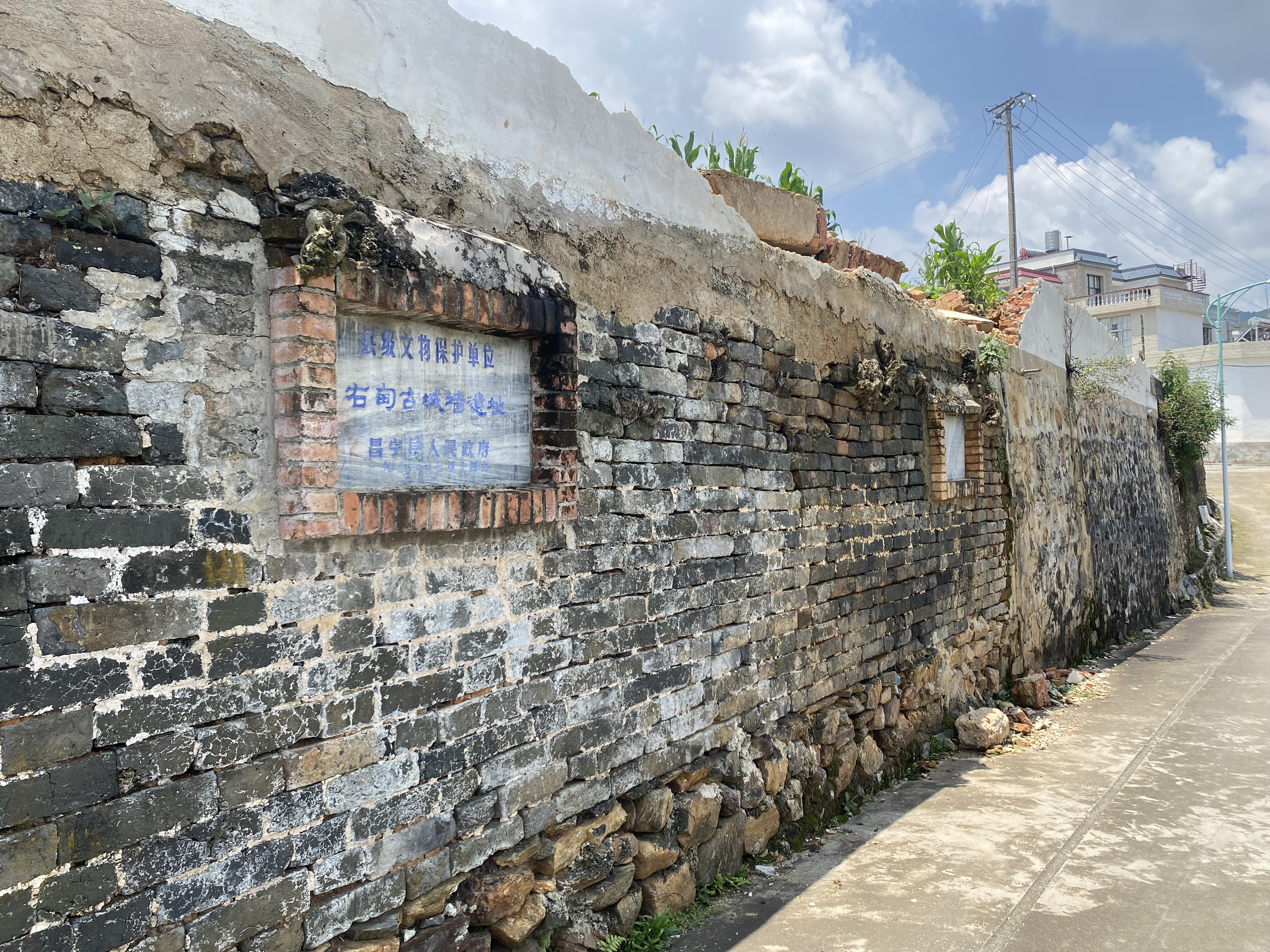
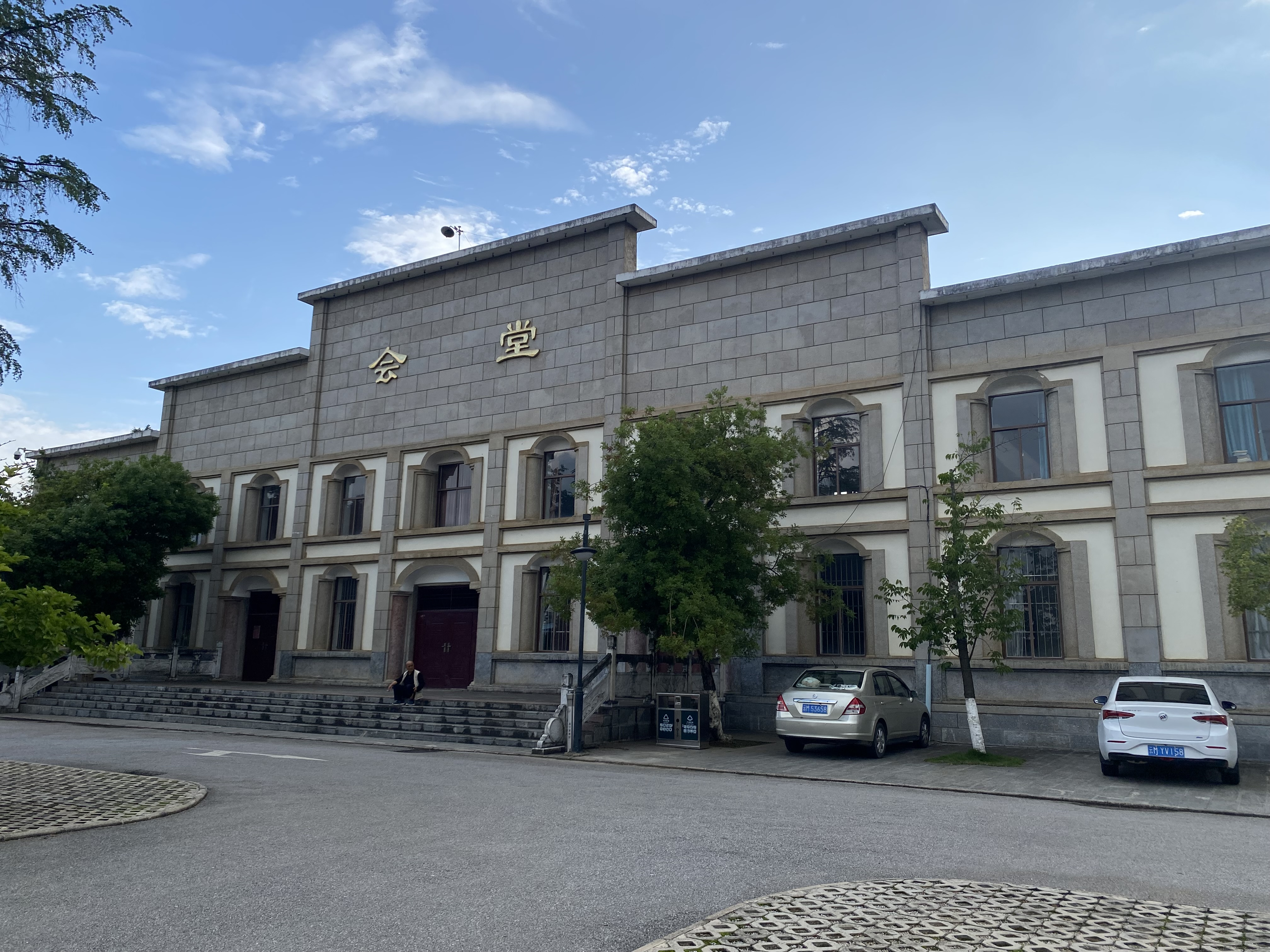
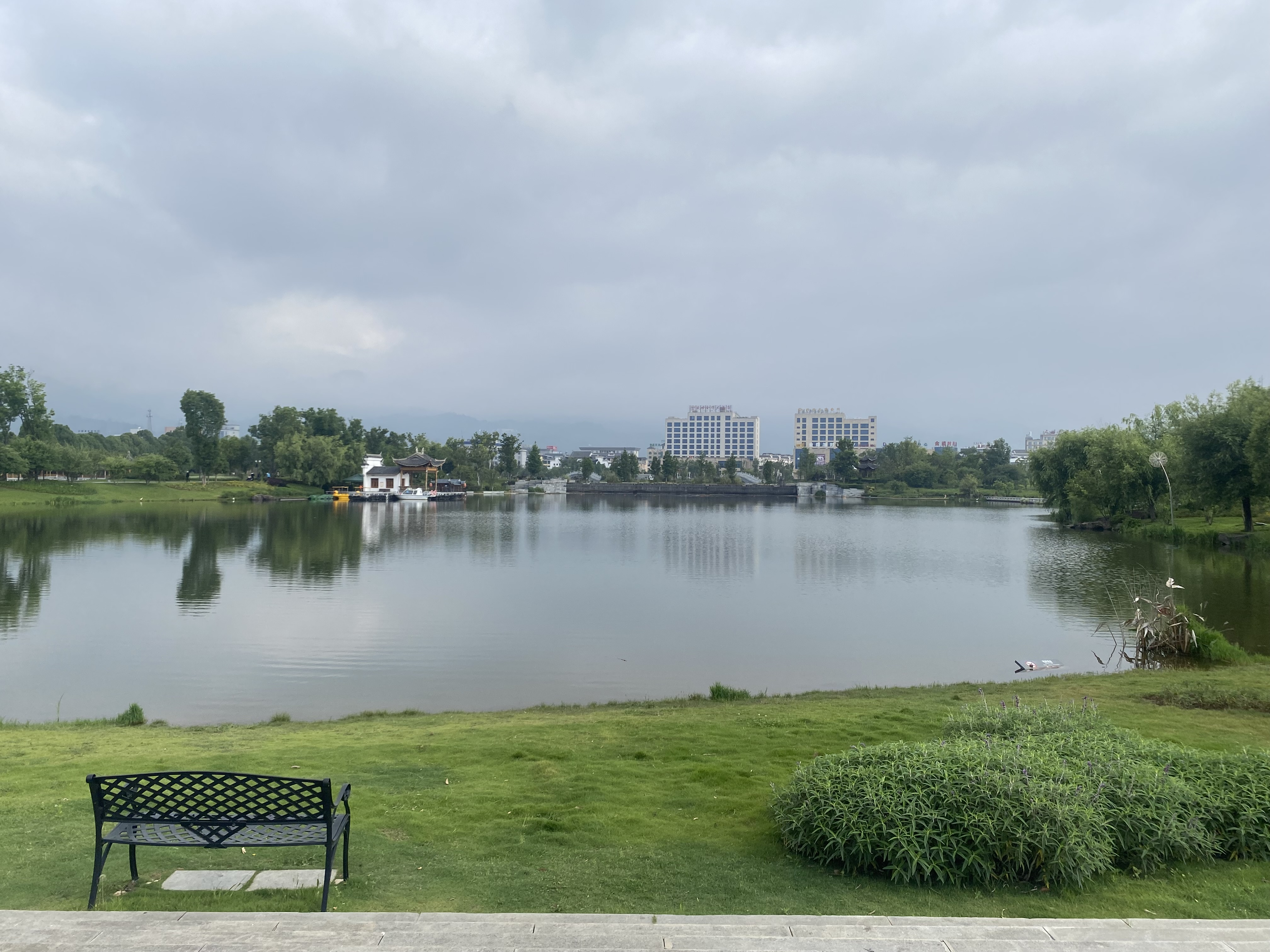
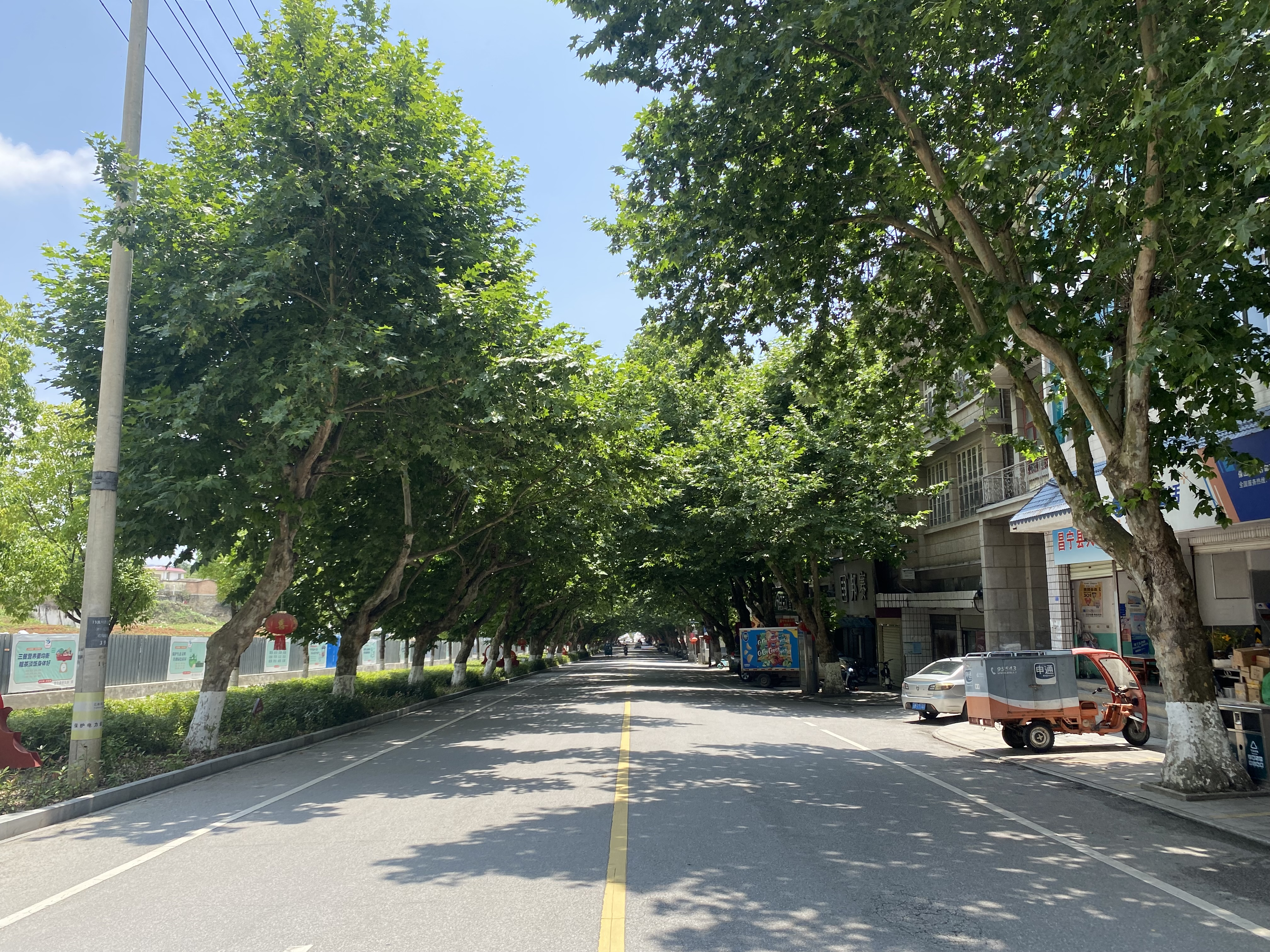
- Cityscape of county town City wall of Changning Changning People's Hall Chayun Park Youdian West Road

- Location of Changning County (red) and Baoshan Prefecture (pink) within Yunnan province of China

- Location of the seat in Yunnan
- Country: People's Republic of China
- Province: Yunnan
- Prefecture-level city: Baoshan

Area
  - Total: 3,888 km^{2} (1,501 sq mi)

Population
  - Total: 340,000
  - Density: 87/km^{2} (230/sq mi)
- Postal code: 678100
- Area code: 0875
- Website: www.yncn.gov.cn

Changning County (simplified Chinese: 昌宁县; traditional Chinese: 昌寧縣; pinyin: Chāngníng Xiàn; lit. 'good peace', Burmese: ကောင်းငြိမ်း) is a county located in Baoshan Prefecture, Yunnan Province, China. It borders Fengqing County to the south and east, Yongde County to the south and west, and Longyang District, Shidian County, Yongping County, Yangbi County and Weishan Yi and Hui Autonomous County to the north.

== Administrative divisions ==
Changning County has 9 towns, 1 township and 3 ethnic townships.

9 towns

- Tianyuan (田园镇)
- Mangshui (漭水镇)
- Kejie (柯街镇)
- Kasi (卡斯镇)
- Mengtong (勐统镇)
- Wenquan (温泉镇)
- Datianba (大田坝镇)
- Jifei (鸡飞镇)
- Wengdu (翁堵镇)

1 township

- Gengjia (更戛乡)

3 ethnic townships

- Wandian Dai (湾甸傣族乡)
- Zhujie Yi (珠街彝族乡)
- Goujie Yi and Miao (耈街彝族苗族乡)

== Ethnic groups ==
The Changning County Gazetteer (1990:637-646) lists the following ethnic groups.

- Yi: 16,339 persons (1985)
  - Lalubo subgroup 腊罗拨: Zhujie District 珠街区
  - Tulibo subgroup 土俚拨 (Han exonym: Tuzu 土族): Goujie District 耇街区
- Dai: 5,179 persons (1985)
  - Guke 姑柯 (Kasi 卡斯)、Wandian 湾甸、Mengcong 勐统
- Miao: 4,033 persons (1985)
  - Zhujie 珠街、Goujie 耇街、Gengga 更嘎、Mengcong 勐统、Kejie 柯街
- Bulang: 1,057 persons (1985); autonyms: Puman 蒲满、Benren 本人
  - Guban 谷板、Zhongzhai 中寨 of Xingu Township 新谷乡, Western Kasi District 卡斯区西部
  - Shuanglong 双龙、Yingbaizhai 应百寨、Ergou 二沟 of Kasi Township 卡斯乡
  - Baicaolin 白草林、Dachushui 大出水 of Ximi Township 西米乡, Gengga District 更嘎区
- Bai: 410 persons (1985)
  - Erdaoqiao 二道桥, Lanshan Township 兰山乡, Kasi District 卡斯区
- Hui: 831 persons (1985)
  - Mengtingzhai 勐廷寨, Mengting Township 勐廷乡, Dabing District 达丙区
  - Kejie 柯街
  - Wandian 湾甸

== Climate ==
Climate data for Changning, elevation 1,667 m (5,469 ft), (1991–2020 normals, extremes 1981–present)
Month	Jan	Feb	Mar	Apr	May	Jun	Jul	Aug	Sep	Oct	Nov	Dec	Year
Record high °C (°F)	22.5 (72.5)	24.9 (76.8)	28.3 (82.9)	30.0 (86.0)	31.8 (89.2)	31.3 (88.3)	30.0 (86.0)	31.2 (88.2)	29.5 (85.1)	28.6 (83.5)	26.2 (79.2)	22.3 (72.1)	31.8 (89.2)
Mean daily maximum °C (°F)	17.0 (62.6)	19.0 (66.2)	22.1 (71.8)	24.2 (75.6)	25.5 (77.9)	25.5 (77.9)	24.8 (76.6)	25.6 (78.1)	25.1 (77.2)	23.3 (73.9)	20.4 (68.7)	17.7 (63.9)	22.5 (72.5)
Daily mean °C (°F)	7.9 (46.2)	9.9 (49.8)	13.0 (55.4)	15.7 (60.3)	18.8 (65.8)	20.9 (69.6)	20.6 (69.1)	20.6 (69.1)	19.5 (67.1)	17.1 (62.8)	12.4 (54.3)	8.9 (48.0)	15.4 (59.8)
Mean daily minimum °C (°F)	0.9 (33.6)	2.2 (36.0)	5.0 (41.0)	8.7 (47.7)	13.5 (56.3)	17.8 (64.0)	18.2 (64.8)	17.8 (64.0)	16.4 (61.5)	13.3 (55.9)	7.2 (45.0)	2.8 (37.0)	10.3 (50.6)
Record low °C (°F)	−5.1 (22.8)	−3.6 (25.5)	−1.2 (29.8)	1.3 (34.3)	5.3 (41.5)	13.3 (55.9)	12.8 (55.0)	12.9 (55.2)	6.5 (43.7)	4.0 (39.2)	−0.3 (31.5)	−4.5 (23.9)	−5.1 (22.8)
Average precipitation mm (inches)	27.2 (1.07)	23.0 (0.91)	31.4 (1.24)	54.4 (2.14)	106.1 (4.18)	150.1 (5.91)	243.1 (9.57)	251.2 (9.89)	152.0 (5.98)	113.7 (4.48)	33.0 (1.30)	11.9 (0.47)	1,197.1 (47.14)
Average precipitation days (≥ 0.1 mm)	4.2	5.2	7.5	11.7	13.5	19.7	25.1	22.9	18.6	13.4	5.6	3.0	150.4
Average relative humidity (%)	77	70	67	72	76	82	87	87	86	84	82	80	79
Mean monthly sunshine hours	224.6	218.6	242.4	228.2	213.5	141.6	101.9	138.9	147.3	169.1	197.7	205.8	2,229.6
Percentage possible sunshine	67	68	65	59	52	35	25	35	40	48	61	63	52
Source: China Meteorological Administrationall-time November high
