= Yunlong County =

Yunlong County 云龙县
- County
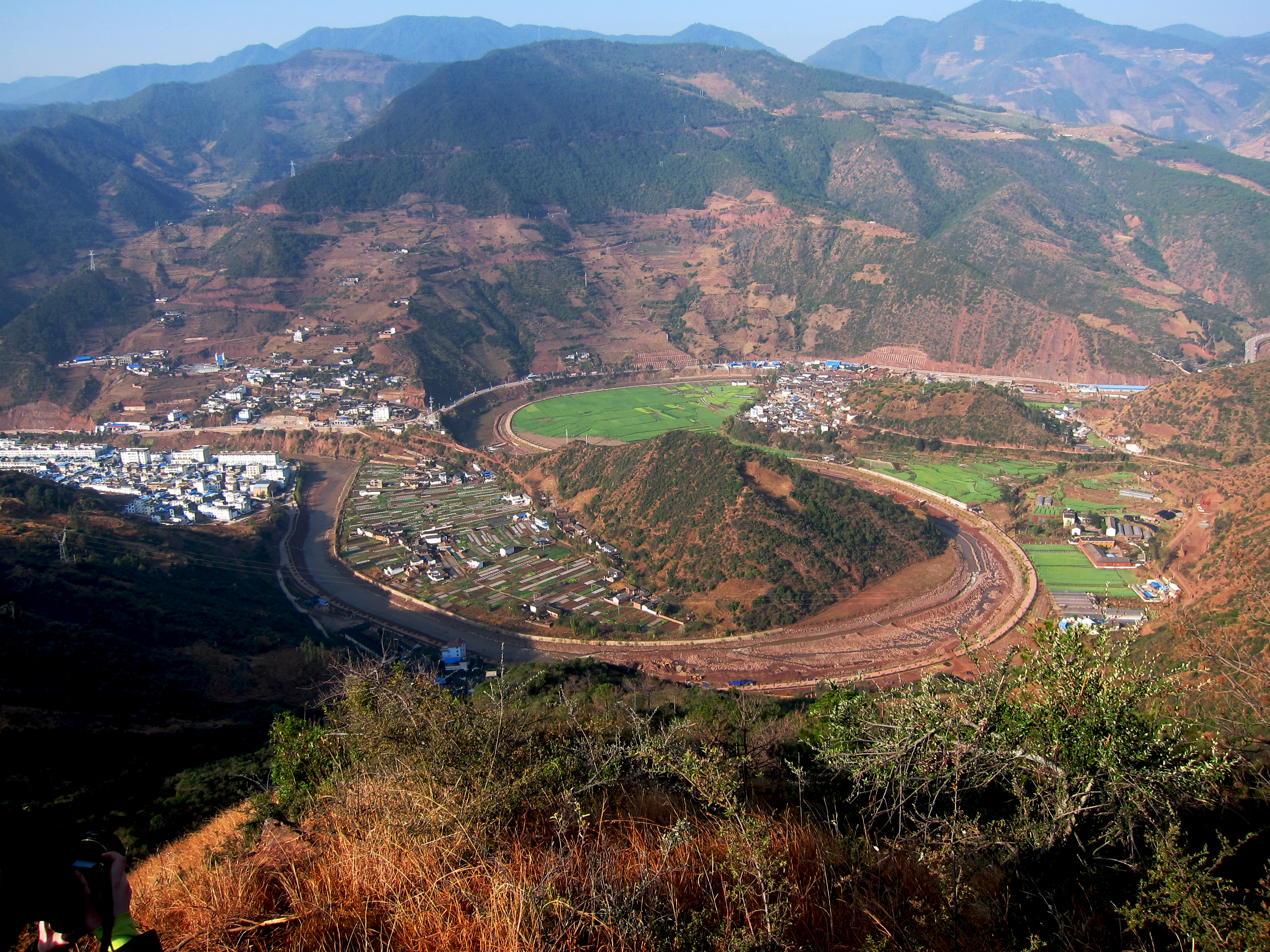

- Location of Yunlong County (red) and Dali Prefecture (pink) within Yunnan

- Location of the seat in Yunnan Yunlong County (China)
- Coordinates: 25°53′10″N 99°22′16″E
- Country: China
- Province: Yunnan
- Autonomous prefecture: Dali
- County seat: Nuodeng

Area
  - Total: 4,400.95 km^{2} (1,699.22 sq mi)

Population (2020 census)
  - Total: 182,977
  - Density: 41.5767/km^{2} (107.683/sq mi)
- Time zone: UTC+8 (CST)
- Postal code: 672700
- Area code: 0872
- Climate: Cwa
- Website: www.ylx.gov.cn

Yunlong County (simplified Chinese: 云龙县; traditional Chinese: 雲龍縣; pinyin: Yúnlóng Xiàn) is under the administration of the Dali Bai Autonomous Prefecture in the northwest of Yunnan Province, China; it is the westernmost county-level division of Dali Prefecture.

Yunlong borders Eryuan County and Yangbi County to the east, Yongping County and Longyang District to the south, Lushui to the west, and Jianchuan County and Lanping County to the north.

== Administrative divisions ==
Yunlong County has 4 towns, 5 townships and 2 ethnic townships.

4 towns

- Nuodeng (诺邓镇)
- Gongguoqiao (功果桥镇)
- Caojian (漕涧镇)
- Baishi (白石镇)

5 townships

- Baofeng Township (宝丰乡)
- Guanping Township (关坪乡)
- Zhangxin Township (长新乡)
- Jiancao Township (检槽乡)
- Minjian Township (民建乡)

2 ethnic townships

- Tuanjie Yi Ethnic Township (团结彝族乡)
- Miaowei Lisu Ethnic Township (苗尾傈僳族乡)

== Ethnic groups ==
There are 2,448 Achang in Yunlong County, most of whom reside in Renshan Village 仁山村, Caojian Town 漕涧镇 (Dali Ethnic Gazetteer 2009:216).

== Climate ==
Climate data for Yunlong, elevation 1,724 m (5,656 ft), (1991–2020 normals, extremes 1981–present)
Month	Jan	Feb	Mar	Apr	May	Jun	Jul	Aug	Sep	Oct	Nov	Dec	Year
Record high °C (°F)	26.4 (79.5)	28.2 (82.8)	31.5 (88.7)	33.0 (91.4)	35.0 (95.0)	35.6 (96.1)	34.5 (94.1)	33.3 (91.9)	33.5 (92.3)	31.4 (88.5)	30.5 (86.9)	24.6 (76.3)	35.6 (96.1)
Mean daily maximum °C (°F)	18.8 (65.8)	20.8 (69.4)	23.3 (73.9)	25.9 (78.6)	28.0 (82.4)	29.1 (84.4)	27.7 (81.9)	27.7 (81.9)	27.0 (80.6)	25.0 (77.0)	21.9 (71.4)	19.3 (66.7)	24.5 (76.2)
Daily mean °C (°F)	8.5 (47.3)	10.8 (51.4)	14.0 (57.2)	17.1 (62.8)	20.4 (68.7)	22.7 (72.9)	22.1 (71.8)	21.6 (70.9)	20.4 (68.7)	17.3 (63.1)	12.4 (54.3)	9.0 (48.2)	16.4 (61.4)
Mean daily minimum °C (°F)	1.2 (34.2)	3.3 (37.9)	6.7 (44.1)	10.2 (50.4)	14.3 (57.7)	18.0 (64.4)	18.7 (65.7)	18.1 (64.6)	16.8 (62.2)	12.9 (55.2)	6.5 (43.7)	2.2 (36.0)	10.7 (51.3)
Record low °C (°F)	−3.5 (25.7)	−2.9 (26.8)	−0.3 (31.5)	4.0 (39.2)	7.5 (45.5)	11.0 (51.8)	14.1 (57.4)	11.5 (52.7)	8.9 (48.0)	4.2 (39.6)	0.3 (32.5)	−4.2 (24.4)	−4.2 (24.4)
Average precipitation mm (inches)	13.4 (0.53)	14.5 (0.57)	28.0 (1.10)	23.6 (0.93)	51.5 (2.03)	87.2 (3.43)	160.7 (6.33)	175.0 (6.89)	109.9 (4.33)	62.4 (2.46)	19.4 (0.76)	5.3 (0.21)	750.9 (29.57)
Average precipitation days (≥ 0.1 mm)	3.7	4.7	7.5	8.6	9.7	13.7	21.5	21.7	17.3	11.2	4.5	2.0	126.1
Average snowy days	0.1	0	0.1	0	0	0	0	0	0	0	0	0	0.2
Average relative humidity (%)	61	55	54	56	60	69	78	81	80	77	72	68	68
Mean monthly sunshine hours	209.8	200.5	206.9	199.4	184.4	135.5	99.3	119.2	124.8	158.6	198.7	210.2	2,047.3
Percentage possible sunshine	63	63	55	52	44	33	24	30	34	45	61	65	47
Source: China Meteorological Administrationall-time November record high
