= Jianchuan County =

Jianchuan County 剑川县 · Jinp•cuinl xiainb
- County
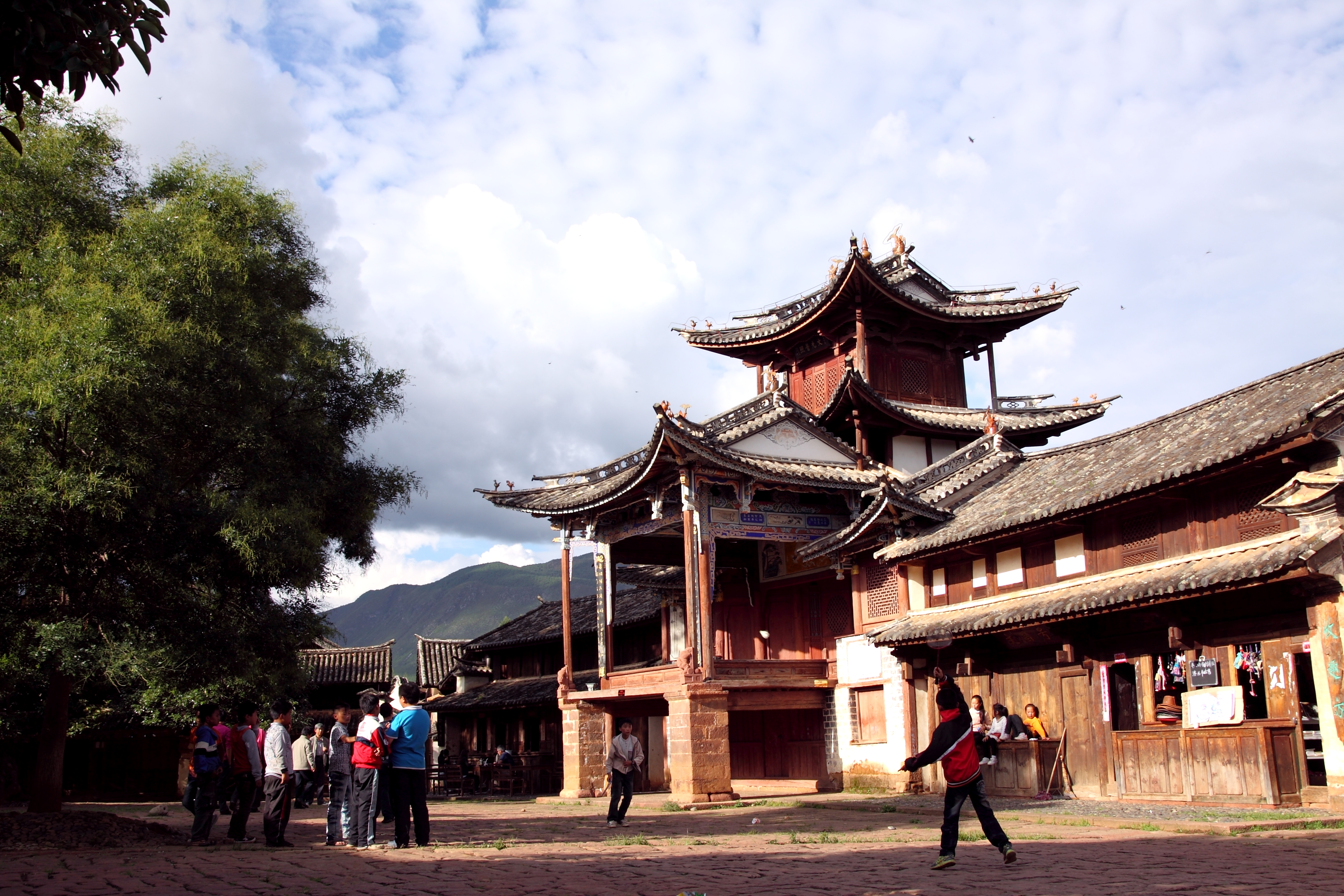

- Location of Jianchuan County (red) and Dali City (pink) within Yunnan province

- Location of the seat in Yunnan Jianchuan (China)
- Coordinates: 26°25′07″N 99°44′25″E
- Country: China
- Province: Yunnan
- Prefecture-level city: Dali
- County seat: Jinhua

Area
  - Total: 2,318 km^{2} (895 sq mi)

Population (2020 census)
  - Total: 160,471
  - Density: 69.23/km^{2} (179.3/sq mi)
- Time zone: UTC+8 (CST)
- Postal code: 671300
- Area code: 0872
- Climate: Cwb
- Website: www.jianchuan.gov.cn

Jianchuan County (simplified Chinese: 剑川县; traditional Chinese: 劍川縣; pinyin: Jiànchuān Xiàn; Bai: Jinp•cuinl), historically known as Yidu (Chinese: 义督; pinyin: Yìdū; Bai: Jiex•dvnl) is a county in the Dali Bai Autonomous Prefecture located in the western part of Yunnan Province, China. The county is about 50 km (31 mi) southwest of Lijiang and 120 km (75 mi) north of Dali.

The historical town of Shaxi in the southeast of the county lies on the old Tea Horse Road to Bengal. China National Highway 214, from Xining to Jinghong in southern Yunnan, passes through the northeast of the county.

Jianchuan borders Heqing County to the east, Eryuan County to the south, Lanping County and Yunlong County to the west, and Yulong Naxi Autonomous County to the north.

== Administrative divisions ==
Jianchuan County has 5 towns and 3 townships.

5 towns

- Jinhua (金华镇)
- Laojunshan (老君山镇)
- Diannan (甸南镇)
- Shaxi (沙溪镇)
- Madeng (马登镇)

3 townships

- Yangcen (羊岑乡)
- Misha (弥沙乡)
- Xiangtu (象图乡)

== Climate ==
Climate data for Jianchuan, elevation 2,191 m (7,188 ft), (1991–2020 normals, extremes 1981–present)
Month	Jan	Feb	Mar	Apr	May	Jun	Jul	Aug	Sep	Oct	Nov	Dec	Year
Record high °C (°F)	24.7 (76.5)	24.0 (75.2)	27.2 (81.0)	29.4 (84.9)	31.4 (88.5)	32.5 (90.5)	31.1 (88.0)	29.6 (85.3)	29.0 (84.2)	28.4 (83.1)	25.7 (78.3)	22.2 (72.0)	32.5 (90.5)
Mean daily maximum °C (°F)	15.6 (60.1)	17.4 (63.3)	19.6 (67.3)	22.0 (71.6)	24.4 (75.9)	25.0 (77.0)	24.0 (75.2)	24.3 (75.7)	23.4 (74.1)	21.7 (71.1)	18.6 (65.5)	16.2 (61.2)	21.0 (69.8)
Daily mean °C (°F)	5.2 (41.4)	7.3 (45.1)	10.1 (50.2)	13.2 (55.8)	16.8 (62.2)	19.4 (66.9)	19.0 (66.2)	18.5 (65.3)	17.0 (62.6)	13.8 (56.8)	9.1 (48.4)	5.8 (42.4)	12.9 (55.3)
Mean daily minimum °C (°F)	−2.4 (27.7)	−0.6 (30.9)	2.3 (36.1)	5.7 (42.3)	10.4 (50.7)	15.1 (59.2)	15.8 (60.4)	15.1 (59.2)	13.5 (56.3)	8.9 (48.0)	2.6 (36.7)	−1.6 (29.1)	7.1 (44.7)
Record low °C (°F)	−8.7 (16.3)	−8.4 (16.9)	−5.2 (22.6)	−1.1 (30.0)	1.1 (34.0)	7.2 (45.0)	9.4 (48.9)	7.7 (45.9)	3.5 (38.3)	0.0 (32.0)	−4.3 (24.3)	−7.6 (18.3)	−8.7 (16.3)
Average precipitation mm (inches)	7.4 (0.29)	7.4 (0.29)	16.3 (0.64)	16.7 (0.66)	55.4 (2.18)	100.2 (3.94)	183.2 (7.21)	174.8 (6.88)	107.9 (4.25)	50.3 (1.98)	15.0 (0.59)	3.4 (0.13)	738 (29.04)
Average precipitation days (≥ 0.1 mm)	2.8	3.6	5.7	6.9	10.6	16.2	22.4	21.9	19.3	10.4	3.6	1.5	124.9
Average snowy days	0.5	0.4	0.2	0	0	0	0	0	0	0	0.1	0.2	1.4
Average relative humidity (%)	57	54	55	59	64	74	82	83	83	77	69	63	68
Mean monthly sunshine hours	245.3	227.0	233.0	216.8	202.3	153.4	108.3	121.2	125.2	173.7	221.6	250.1	2,277.9
Percentage possible sunshine	74	71	62	56	49	37	26	30	34	49	69	77	53
Source: China Meteorological Administration All-time October highall-time November record high
