= Xuzhang language =

Language

Xuzhang
- Native to: China
- Ethnicity: Yi
- Native speakers: 2,000 (2010)
- Language family: Sino-Tibetan: (Tibeto-Burman); Lolo–Burmese; Loloish; Lisoish; Lalo–Lavu; Xuzhang

Language codes
- ISO 639-3: (proposal rejected)
- Glottolog: xuzh1234

Xuzhang (autonym: la21 lu33) is a Loloish language of Yunnan, China. There are 2,000 speakers in Xuzhang, Wafang, Longyang District, Baoshan Prefecture.
