= Yongping County =

Yongping County 永平县 · Hhuid bid xiainb
- County
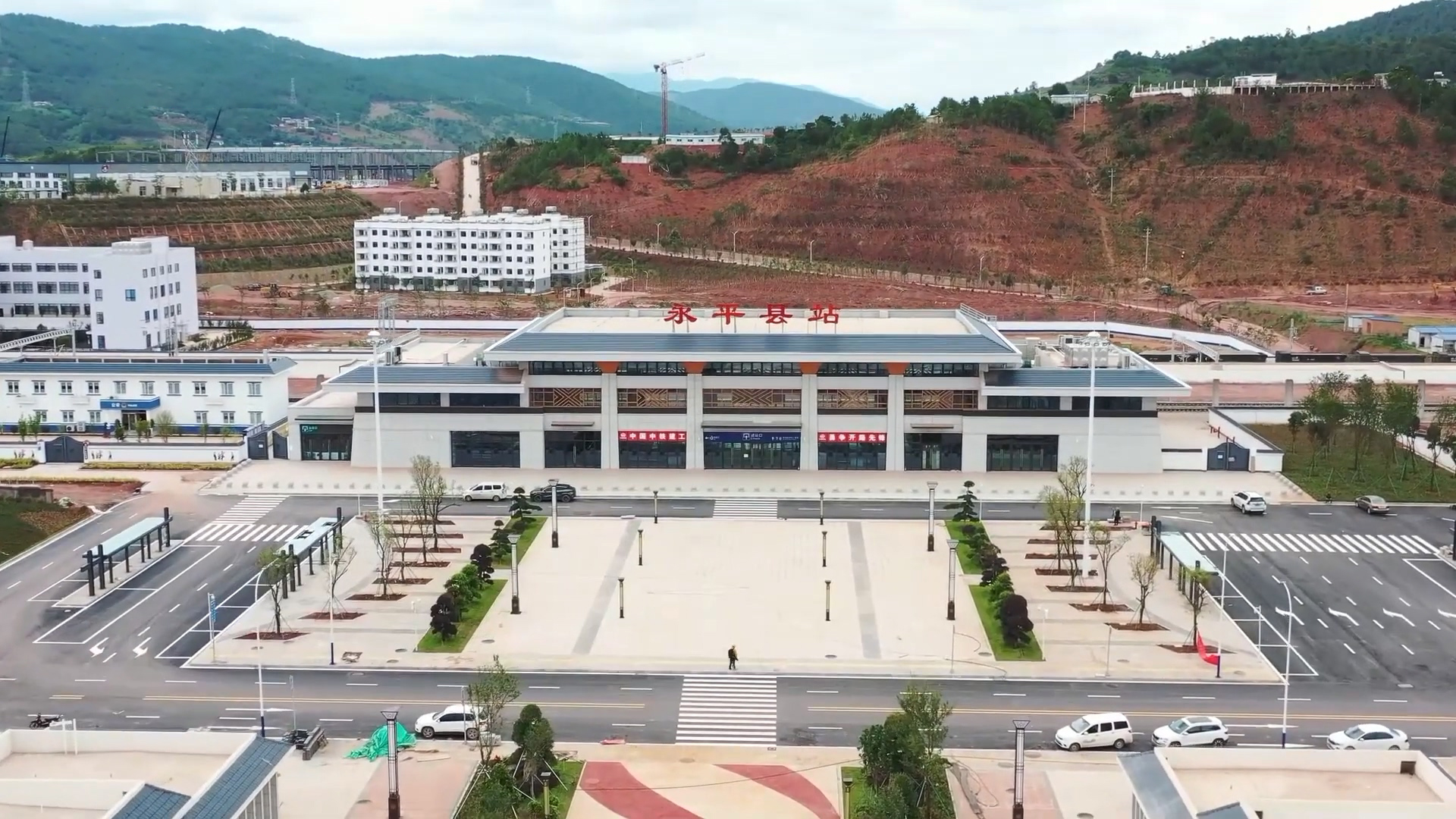
- Yongping County Railway Station of Dali–Ruili railway

- Location of Yongping County (red) and Dali Prefecture (pink) within Yunnan

- Location within Yunnan Location within China
- Coordinates: 25°28′01″N 99°32′24″E
- Country: China
- Province: Yunnan
- Autonomous prefecture: Dali
- County seat: Bonan

Area
  - Total: 2,884 km^{2} (1,114 sq mi)

Population (2020 census)
  - Total: 164,613
  - Density: 57.08/km^{2} (147.8/sq mi)
- Time zone: UTC+8 (CST)
- Postal code: 672600
- Area code: 0872
- Climate: Cwa
- Website: www.ypx.gov.cn

Yongping County (Chinese: 永平县; pinyin: Yǒngpíng Xiàn; Bai: Hhuid bid or Yond•beit) is a county of the Dali Bai Autonomous Prefecture, located in the west of Yunnan Province, China. It borders Yangbi County to the east, Changning County to the south, Longyang District to the west and Yunlong County to the north.

== Administrative divisions ==
Yongping County has 3 towns, 1 township and 3 ethnic townships.

3 towns

- Bonan (博南镇)
- Shanyang (杉阳镇)
- Longjie (龙街镇)

1 township

- Longmen Township (龙门乡)

3 ethnic townships

- Beidou Yi Ethnic Township (北斗彝族乡)
- Changjie Yi Ethnic Township (厂街彝族乡)
- Shuixie Yi Ethnic Township (水泄彝族乡)

== Climate ==
Climate data for Yongping, elevation 1,617 m (5,305 ft), (1991–2020 normals, extremes 1981–present)
Month	Jan	Feb	Mar	Apr	May	Jun	Jul	Aug	Sep	Oct	Nov	Dec	Year
Record high °C (°F)	23.5 (74.3)	26.0 (78.8)	29.8 (85.6)	31.9 (89.4)	33.8 (92.8)	32.9 (91.2)	32.1 (89.8)	32.3 (90.1)	31.7 (89.1)	29.9 (85.8)	28.4 (83.1)	23.5 (74.3)	33.8 (92.8)
Mean daily maximum °C (°F)	18.0 (64.4)	19.9 (67.8)	22.8 (73.0)	25.4 (77.7)	26.8 (80.2)	27.1 (80.8)	26.5 (79.7)	26.9 (80.4)	26.2 (79.2)	24.3 (75.7)	21.3 (70.3)	18.6 (65.5)	23.7 (74.6)
Daily mean °C (°F)	8.2 (46.8)	10.2 (50.4)	13.2 (55.8)	16.6 (61.9)	20.0 (68.0)	21.9 (71.4)	21.6 (70.9)	21.3 (70.3)	20.2 (68.4)	17.5 (63.5)	12.7 (54.9)	8.9 (48.0)	16.0 (60.9)
Mean daily minimum °C (°F)	0.5 (32.9)	1.9 (35.4)	4.8 (40.6)	8.7 (47.7)	14.3 (57.7)	18.1 (64.6)	18.6 (65.5)	18.0 (64.4)	16.8 (62.2)	13.4 (56.1)	6.8 (44.2)	1.9 (35.4)	10.3 (50.6)
Record low °C (°F)	−4.3 (24.3)	−3.4 (25.9)	−1.5 (29.3)	1.5 (34.7)	6.7 (44.1)	12.6 (54.7)	13.8 (56.8)	11.6 (52.9)	5.0 (41.0)	5.4 (41.7)	−0.4 (31.3)	−3.7 (25.3)	−4.3 (24.3)
Average precipitation mm (inches)	18.4 (0.72)	14.7 (0.58)	24.0 (0.94)	26.5 (1.04)	66.7 (2.63)	102.4 (4.03)	199.1 (7.84)	206.9 (8.15)	160.7 (6.33)	89.8 (3.54)	24.9 (0.98)	6.5 (0.26)	940.6 (37.04)
Average precipitation days (≥ 0.1 mm)	4.1	4.8	7.2	9.0	10.6	15.0	22.4	22.3	18.0	13.5	4.8	2.6	134.3
Average snowy days	0.1	0	0.1	0	0	0	0	0	0	0	0	0	0.2
Average relative humidity (%)	71	67	64	65	68	77	84	85	84	81	78	75	75
Mean monthly sunshine hours	229.0	217.8	232.3	225.3	210.5	139.5	94.0	121.8	127.3	162.7	197.2	214.0	2,171.4
Percentage possible sunshine	69	68	62	59	51	34	23	31	35	46	61	66	50
Source: China Meteorological Administrationall-time November record high
