= Weishan Yi and Hui Autonomous County =

Weishan County 巍山县 · وِشًا · Med•hot xiainb
- Autonomous county
- 巍山彝族回族自治县 وِشًا یِذُو خُوِذُو ذِجِشِیًا; Weishan Yi and Hui Autonomous County
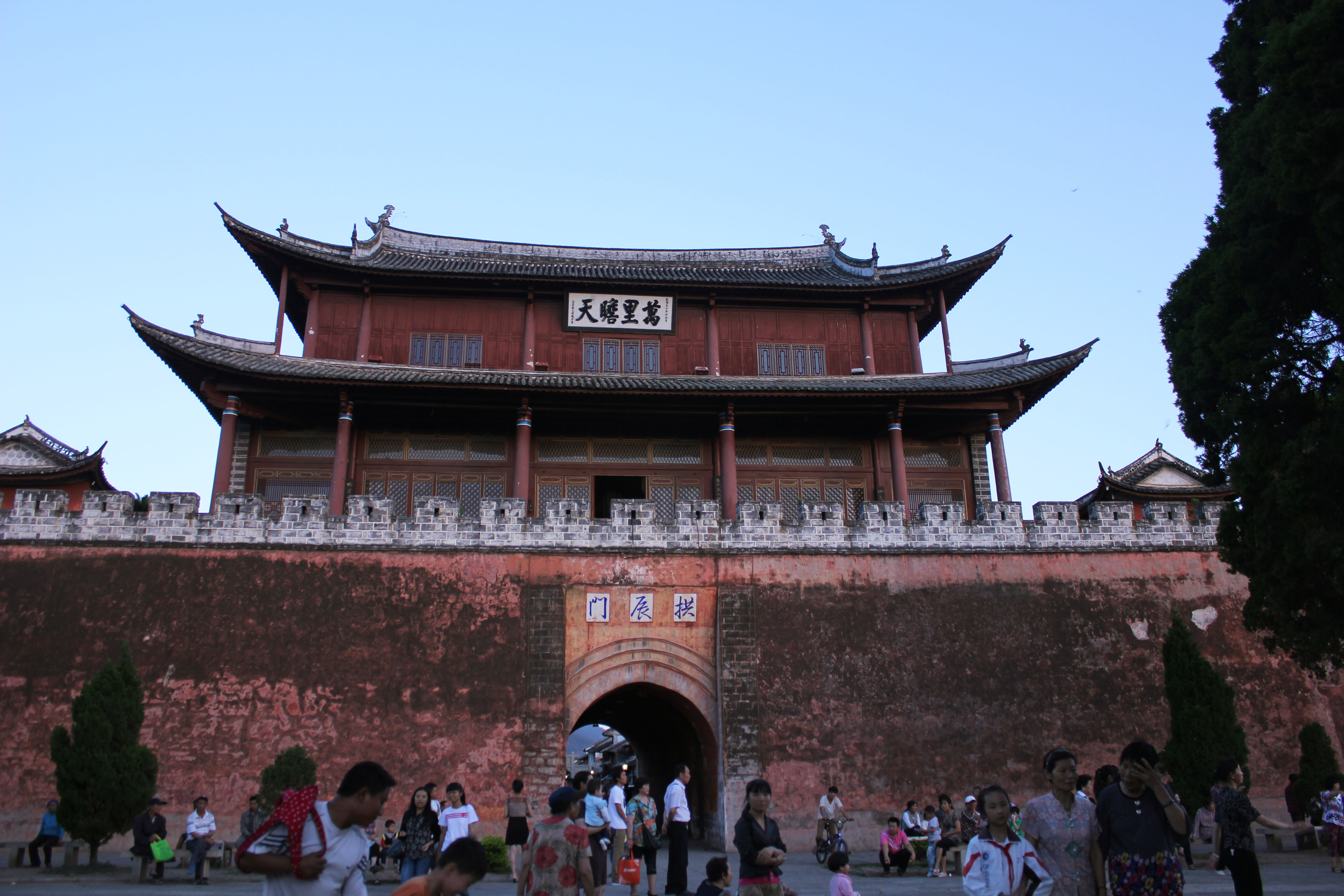
- Gongchen Tower, atop the Gongchen Gate, is a symbol of Weishan

- Location of Weishan County (red) in Dali Prefecture (pink) and Yunnan

- Location of the seat in Yunnan Weishan (China)
- Coordinates (Weishan County government): 25°13′37″N 100°18′25″E
- Country: China
- Province: Yunnan
- Autonomous prefecture: Dali
- County seat: Nanzhao

Area
  - Total: 2,200 km^{2} (850 sq mi)

Population (2020 census)
  - Total: 267,474
  - Density: 120/km^{2} (310/sq mi)
- Time zone: UTC+8 (CST)
- Postal code: 672400
- Area code: 0872
- Climate: Cwb
- Website: www.dlweishan.gov.cn

Weishan Yi and Hui Autonomous County (Chinese: 巍山彝族回族自治县; pinyin: Wēishān Yízú Huízú Zìzhìxiàn; Xiao'erjing: وِشًا یِذُو خُوِذُو ذِجِشِیًا; Bai: Med•hot) is an autonomous county in the Dali Bai Autonomous Prefecture, in northwestern Yunnan Province, China. It was known as Menghua (蒙化) until the 1950s.

Weishan borders Midu County to the east, Nanjian County and Fengqing County to the south, Yangbi County and Changning County to the west, and Dali City to the north.

== Geography ==
It is situated in the upper section of the Ailao Mountains and the Wuliang Mountains.

== Administrative divisions ==
Weishan Yi and Hui Autonomous County has 4 towns and 6 townships.

4 towns

- Nanzhao (南诏镇)
- Miaojie (庙街镇)
- Dacang (大仓镇)
- Yongjian (永建镇)

6 townships

- Weibaoshan (巍宝山乡)
- Ma'anshan (马鞍山乡)
- Zijin (紫金乡)
- Wuyin (五印乡)
- Niujie (牛街乡)
- Qinghua (青华乡)

== Climate ==
Climate data for Weishan, elevation 1,733 m (5,686 ft), (1991–2020 normals, extremes 1981–present)
Month	Jan	Feb	Mar	Apr	May	Jun	Jul	Aug	Sep	Oct	Nov	Dec	Year
Record high °C (°F)	23.6 (74.5)	25.6 (78.1)	29.6 (85.3)	31.5 (88.7)	34.3 (93.7)	32.5 (90.5)	31.9 (89.4)	31.2 (88.2)	31.0 (87.8)	28.8 (83.8)	27.4 (81.3)	22.6 (72.7)	34.3 (93.7)
Mean daily maximum °C (°F)	17.6 (63.7)	19.6 (67.3)	22.7 (72.9)	25.4 (77.7)	26.9 (80.4)	27.1 (80.8)	26.1 (79.0)	26.4 (79.5)	25.7 (78.3)	23.7 (74.7)	20.7 (69.3)	18.2 (64.8)	23.3 (74.0)
Daily mean °C (°F)	8.7 (47.7)	10.8 (51.4)	14.0 (57.2)	17.2 (63.0)	20.4 (68.7)	22.1 (71.8)	21.4 (70.5)	20.9 (69.6)	19.7 (67.5)	17.2 (63.0)	12.6 (54.7)	9.2 (48.6)	16.2 (61.1)
Mean daily minimum °C (°F)	1.8 (35.2)	3.4 (38.1)	6.5 (43.7)	10.4 (50.7)	15.0 (59.0)	18.5 (65.3)	18.4 (65.1)	17.6 (63.7)	16.3 (61.3)	13.1 (55.6)	7.1 (44.8)	2.9 (37.2)	10.9 (51.6)
Record low °C (°F)	−4.0 (24.8)	−2.4 (27.7)	−0.9 (30.4)	2.5 (36.5)	7.7 (45.9)	12.3 (54.1)	12.9 (55.2)	11.6 (52.9)	6.8 (44.2)	5.0 (41.0)	0.6 (33.1)	−4.5 (23.9)	−4.5 (23.9)
Average precipitation mm (inches)	23.3 (0.92)	16.8 (0.66)	22.9 (0.90)	27.9 (1.10)	62.0 (2.44)	97.1 (3.82)	172.3 (6.78)	147.2 (5.80)	93.0 (3.66)	72.3 (2.85)	23.6 (0.93)	8.6 (0.34)	767 (30.2)
Average precipitation days (≥ 0.1 mm)	4.5	5.4	7.2	8.9	10.1	12.9	19.6	19.5	15.2	11.9	5.3	3.2	123.7
Average snowy days	0.1	0	0.1	0	0	0	0	0	0	0	0	0	0.2
Average relative humidity (%)	67	61	58	58	62	71	80	83	81	79	75	72	71
Mean monthly sunshine hours	235.6	222.2	240.2	228.9	207.7	136.7	95.3	123.3	130.2	159.9	210.5	225.5	2,216
Percentage possible sunshine	71	69	64	60	50	33	23	31	36	45	65	69	51
Source: China Meteorological Administrationall-time November record high

== Transportation ==
=== Rail ===
Weishan has a rail station called Weishan Railway Station, with services to Dali City and Lincang.
