= Mangdi language =

Loloish language spoken in Yunnan, China

Mangdi
- Southern Lalo
- Native to: China
- Ethnicity: Yi
- Native speakers: 3,000 (2010)
- Language family: Sino-Tibetan: Lolo–Burmese; Loloish; Lisoish; Lalo–Lavu; Mangdi

Language codes
- ISO 639-3: (proposal rejected)
- Glottolog: sout3210

Mangdi (autonym: lo21 lo33 pɑ̠21) is a Loloish language of Yunnan, China. There are 3,000 speakers in Mangdi, Hepai, Gengma County, Lincang Prefecture, as well as in Cangyuan County.
