= Eryuan County =

Eryuan County 洱源县 · Lod•hol•xi
- County
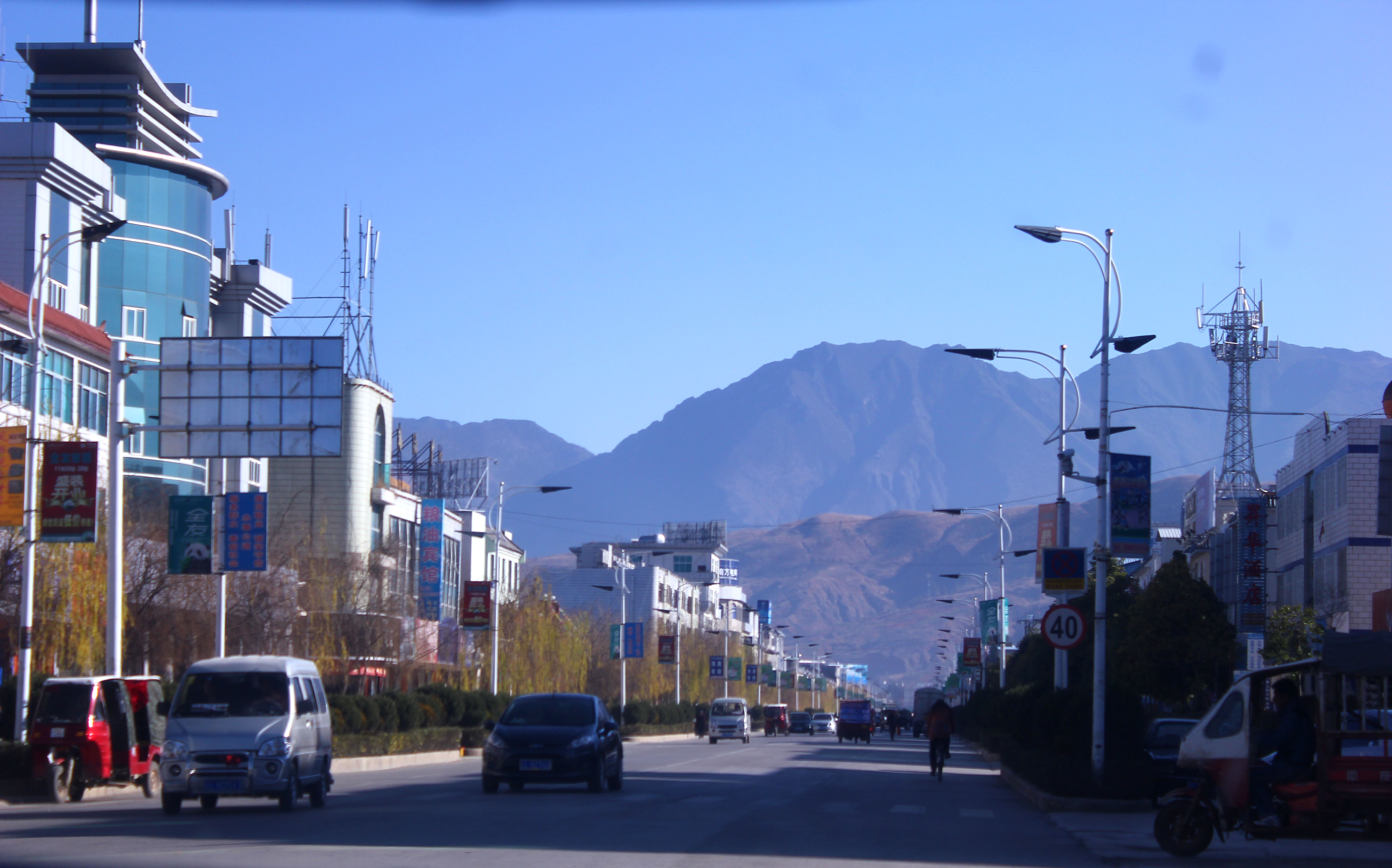

- Location of Eryuan County (red) and Dali Prefecture (pink) within Yunnan province

- Location of the seat in Yunnan Eryuan (China)
- Coordinates: 26.1167°N 99.95°E
- Country: China
- Province: Yunnan
- Autonomous prefecture: Dali
- County seat: Cibihu

Area
  - Total: 2,961 km^{2} (1,143 sq mi)

Population (2020 census)
  - Total: 248,147
  - Density: 83.81/km^{2} (217.1/sq mi)
- Time zone: UTC+8 (CST)
- Postal code: 671200
- Area code: 0872
- Climate: Cwb
- Website: www.eryuan.gov.cn

Eryuan (Chinese: 洱源; pinyin: Ěryuán; Bai: Lod•hol•xi) is a county in the Dali Bai Autonomous Prefecture located in northwestern Yunnan Province, China. It borders Heqing County to the east, Dali City and Yangbi County to the south, Yunlong County to the west and Jianchuan County to the north.

== Administrative divisions ==
Er'yuan County has 6 towns and 3 townships.

6 towns

- Cibihu (茈碧湖镇)
- Dengchuan (邓川镇)
- Yousuo (右所镇)
- Sanying (三营镇)
- Fengyu (凤羽镇)
- Qiaohou (乔后镇)

3 townships

- Niujie (牛街乡)
- Liantie (炼铁乡)
- Xishan (西山乡)

== Ethnic groups ==
There are 208 ethnic Tibetans in Eryuan County, most of whom reside in Zhengjiazhuang 郑家庄, Sanying Town 三营镇 (Dali Ethnic Gazetteer 2009:216). In nearby Dali City, they are found mostly in Tibetan New Village 藏族新村, Xiaohuayuan 小花园, Dali City 大理市.

== Tourism ==
Fengxiang Academy is located in Fengyu Town, Eryuan County, Yunnan Province. It was founded in 1726 (the 4th year of the Yongzheng reign in the Qing Dynasty) and established through a donation by Magistrate Zhang Tan. It was one of the seven major academies of the former Langqiong County. The architectural complex includes a screen wall, a Panchi (semi-circular pond), and the Dacheng Hall, with a history of nearly 300 years. The academy also preserves an ancient ginkgo tree over 330 years old.

During the Qing Dynasty, it cultivated four jinshi, including Zhang Chuo and Zhao Huibi, as well as eleven juren. In the Daoguang period, Zhao Huibi introduced a bilingual teaching model combining the Bai language and Mandarin. In 1911, it was converted into a primary school and educated modern figures such as Shi Jie and Ma Yao.

Since 2019, 3.88 million yuan has been invested in restoration, and the main renovation was completed by the end of 2020, restoring structures such as Zhuangyuan Bridge and the screen wall, and adding the Xu Xiake Cultural Corridor. The site now includes exhibition spaces such as a Folk Museum, Intangible Cultural Heritage Hall, and Red Reading Room, showcasing Bai culture and revolutionary history. It has become an educational base for promoting the sense of a Chinese national community, and in 2024, the reconstruction of the academy square was launched.

== Climate ==
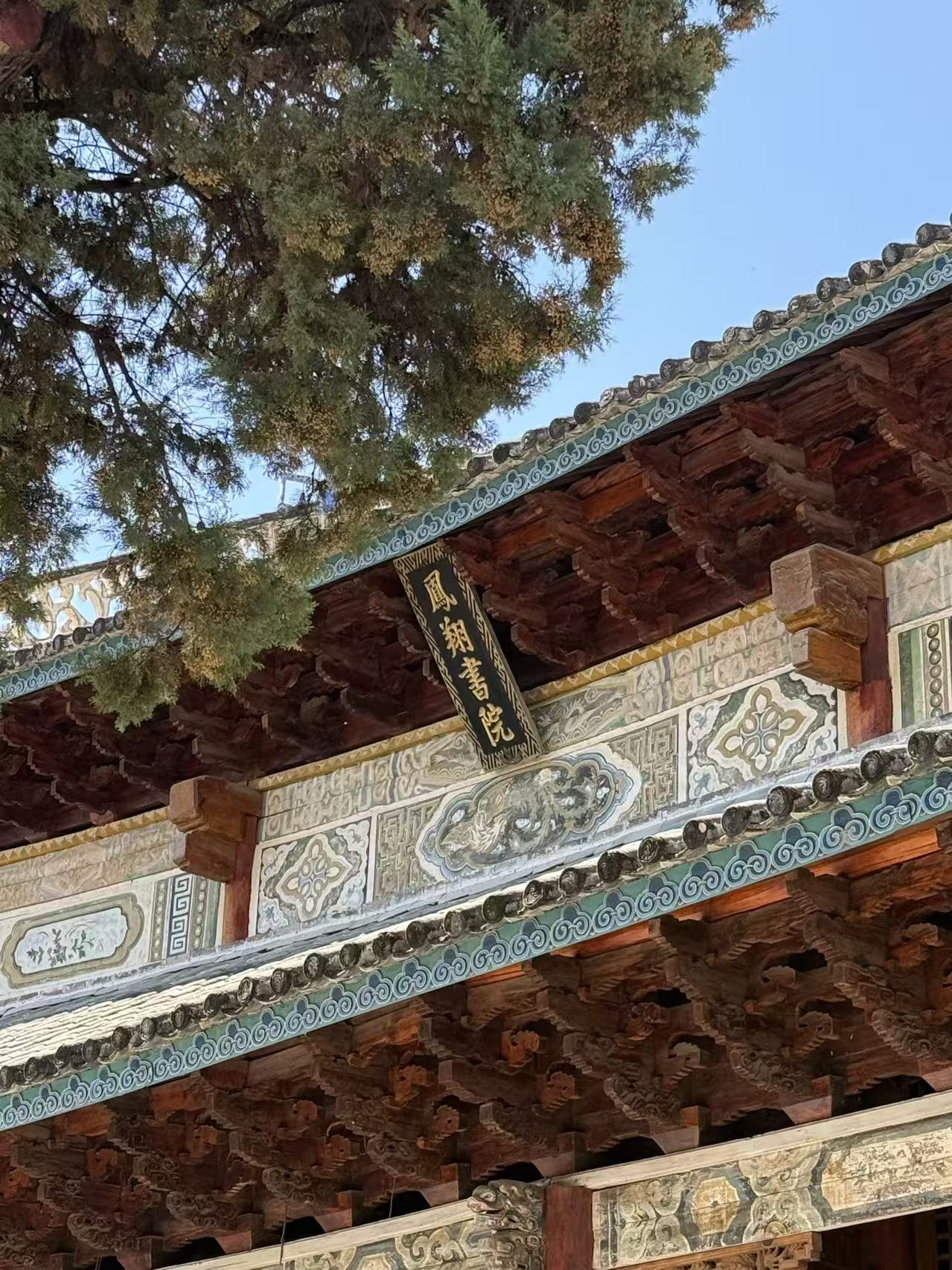
Fengxiang Academy

Climate data for Eryuan, elevation 2,060 m (6,760 ft), (1991–2020 normals, extremes 1981–present)
Month	Jan	Feb	Mar	Apr	May	Jun	Jul	Aug	Sep	Oct	Nov	Dec	Year
Record high °C (°F)	24.2 (75.6)	24.7 (76.5)	28.5 (83.3)	29.6 (85.3)	31.6 (88.9)	31.4 (88.5)	30.6 (87.1)	28.8 (83.8)	29.3 (84.7)	27.0 (80.6)	26.9 (80.4)	23.2 (73.8)	31.6 (88.9)
Mean daily maximum °C (°F)	16.1 (61.0)	18.5 (65.3)	20.7 (69.3)	23.1 (73.6)	25.4 (77.7)	26.1 (79.0)	24.8 (76.6)	24.8 (76.6)	24.2 (75.6)	22.0 (71.6)	19.5 (67.1)	16.7 (62.1)	21.8 (71.3)
Daily mean °C (°F)	7.4 (45.3)	9.6 (49.3)	12.1 (53.8)	15.3 (59.5)	19.0 (66.2)	21.0 (69.8)	20.1 (68.2)	19.3 (66.7)	18.3 (64.9)	15.1 (59.2)	10.8 (51.4)	7.7 (45.9)	14.6 (58.4)
Mean daily minimum °C (°F)	−0.5 (31.1)	1.5 (34.7)	4.1 (39.4)	7.9 (46.2)	12.5 (54.5)	16.5 (61.7)	16.7 (62.1)	15.7 (60.3)	14.3 (57.7)	9.9 (49.8)	3.7 (38.7)	0.2 (32.4)	8.5 (47.4)
Record low °C (°F)	−5.7 (21.7)	−5.7 (21.7)	−3.9 (25.0)	0.1 (32.2)	2.6 (36.7)	9.3 (48.7)	11.2 (52.2)	8.5 (47.3)	4.0 (39.2)	1.1 (34.0)	−2.1 (28.2)	−7.6 (18.3)	−7.6 (18.3)
Average precipitation mm (inches)	10.1 (0.40)	8.7 (0.34)	15.6 (0.61)	17.2 (0.68)	56.5 (2.22)	81.5 (3.21)	166.0 (6.54)	176.9 (6.96)	107.4 (4.23)	56.7 (2.23)	15.7 (0.62)	3.7 (0.15)	716 (28.19)
Average precipitation days (≥ 0.1 mm)	3.4	3.8	6.0	6.3	9.1	13.6	20.2	20.1	17.7	11.3	4.2	2.1	117.8
Average snowy days	0.3	0.2	0.1	0.1	0	0	0	0	0	0	0.1	0.1	0.9
Average relative humidity (%)	57	53	52	55	60	70	80	83	83	76	69	64	67
Mean monthly sunshine hours	245.7	233.7	250.9	237.9	223.1	172.9	132.1	142.1	146.5	188.4	227.1	245.0	2,445.4
Percentage possible sunshine	74	73	67	62	54	42	32	35	40	53	70	75	56
Source: China Meteorological Administrationall-time November record high
