= Yangbi Yi Autonomous County =

Yangbi County 漾濞县 · Jiod•vut xiainb
- Autonomous county
- 漾濞彝族自治县; Yangbi Yi Autonomous County
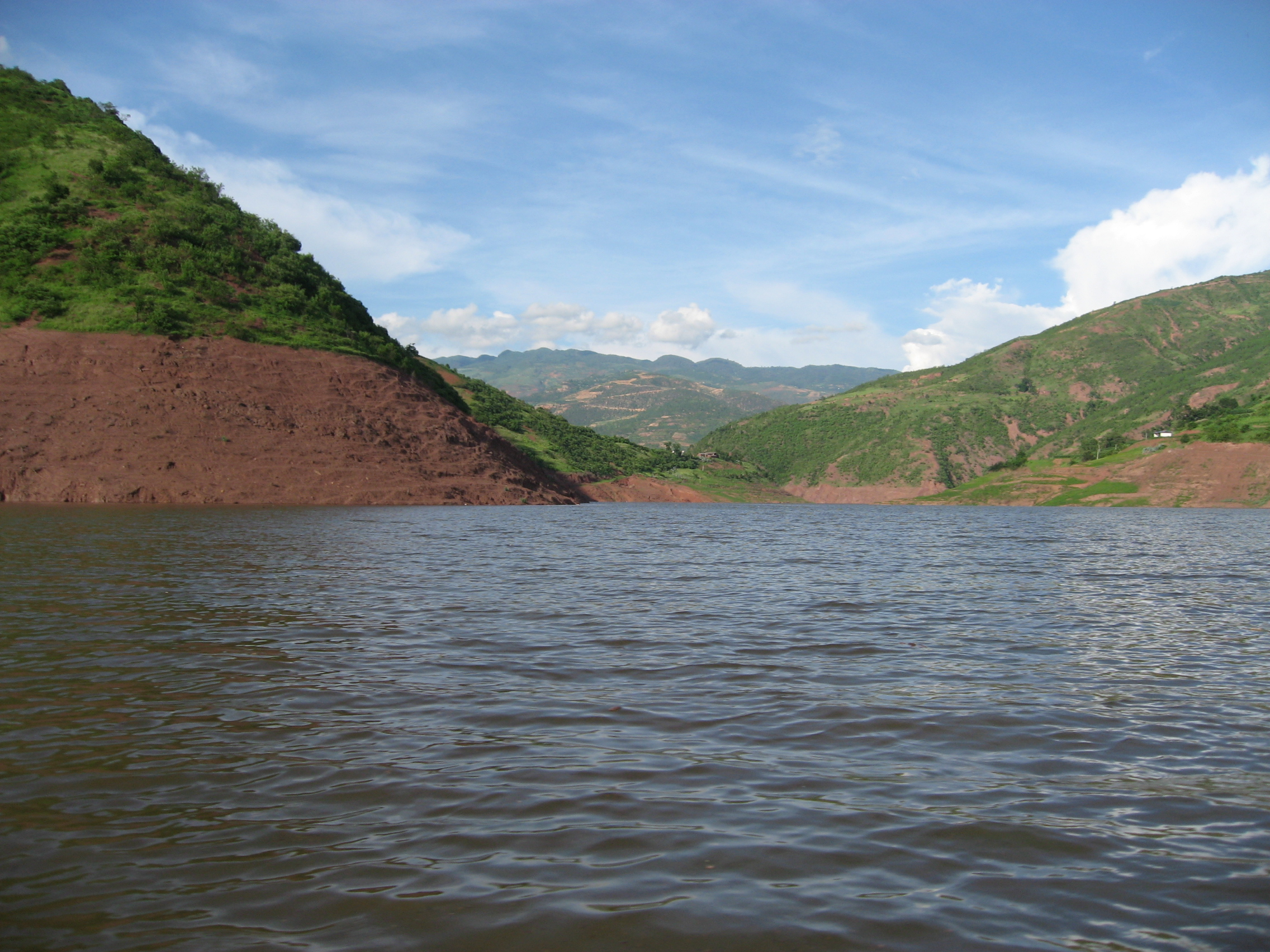

- Location of Yangbi County (red) and Dali Prefecture (pink) within Yunnan

- Location of the seat in Yunnan Yangbi (China)
- Coordinates: 25°38′55″N 99°53′48″E
- Country: China
- Province: Yunnan
- Autonomous prefecture: Dali
- County seat: Cangshanxi

Area
  - Total: 1,957 km^{2} (756 sq mi)

Population (2020 census)
  - Total: 97,610
  - Density: 49.88/km^{2} (129.2/sq mi)
- Time zone: UTC+8 (CST)
- Postal code: 672500
- Area code: 0872
- Climate: Cwa
- Website: www.yangbi.gov.cn

Yangbi Yi Autonomous County (Chinese: 漾濞彝族自治县; pinyin: Yàngbì Yízú Zìzhìxiàn; Bai: Jiod•vut or Qiot•binp or Yanb•bif or Yond•vut) is a county of the Dali Bai Autonomous Prefecture located in the west of Yunnan Province, China. It borders Dali City and Weishan to the east, Changning County to the south, Yongping County and Yunlong County to the west, and Eryuan County to the north.

== Administrative divisions ==
Yangbi Yi Autonomous County has 4 towns and 5 townships.

4 towns

- Cangshanxi (苍山西镇)
- Yangjiang (漾江镇)
- Pingpo (平坡镇)
- Shunbi (顺濞镇)

5 townships

- Fuheng (富恒乡)
- Taiping (太平乡)
- Wachang (瓦厂乡)
- Longtan (龙潭乡)
- Jijie (鸡街乡)

== Climate ==
Climate data for Yangbi, elevation 1,626 m (5,335 ft), (1991–2020 normals, extremes 1981–present)
Month	Jan	Feb	Mar	Apr	May	Jun	Jul	Aug	Sep	Oct	Nov	Dec	Year
Record high °C (°F)	24.4 (75.9)	27.1 (80.8)	30.4 (86.7)	32.5 (90.5)	34.6 (94.3)	34.0 (93.2)	33.2 (91.8)	31.5 (88.7)	31.5 (88.7)	30.3 (86.5)	29.7 (85.5)	24.5 (76.1)	34.6 (94.3)
Mean daily maximum °C (°F)	18.4 (65.1)	20.7 (69.3)	23.6 (74.5)	26.1 (79.0)	27.7 (81.9)	27.7 (81.9)	26.5 (79.7)	27.0 (80.6)	25.9 (78.6)	24.1 (75.4)	21.3 (70.3)	18.8 (65.8)	24.0 (75.2)
Daily mean °C (°F)	9.1 (48.4)	11.5 (52.7)	14.5 (58.1)	17.5 (63.5)	20.6 (69.1)	22.4 (72.3)	21.7 (71.1)	21.4 (70.5)	20.2 (68.4)	17.5 (63.5)	12.8 (55.0)	9.4 (48.9)	16.6 (61.8)
Mean daily minimum °C (°F)	2.2 (36.0)	3.9 (39.0)	7.0 (44.6)	10.4 (50.7)	14.8 (58.6)	18.5 (65.3)	18.7 (65.7)	18.1 (64.6)	16.9 (62.4)	13.5 (56.3)	7.4 (45.3)	3.3 (37.9)	11.2 (52.2)
Record low °C (°F)	−2.3 (27.9)	−1.9 (28.6)	−0.1 (31.8)	3.9 (39.0)	7.5 (45.5)	11.2 (52.2)	13.7 (56.7)	11.6 (52.9)	8.5 (47.3)	6.3 (43.3)	0.9 (33.6)	−2.9 (26.8)	−2.9 (26.8)
Average precipitation mm (inches)	17.5 (0.69)	14.0 (0.55)	22.7 (0.89)	22.4 (0.88)	67.2 (2.65)	123.2 (4.85)	236.4 (9.31)	224.2 (8.83)	167.0 (6.57)	95.9 (3.78)	22.1 (0.87)	6.3 (0.25)	1,018.9 (40.12)
Average precipitation days (≥ 0.1 mm)	3.5	4.6	6.3	7.7	10.2	15.7	23.2	21.1	19.1	13.7	4.7	2.4	132.2
Average snowy days	0	0	0.1	0	0	0	0	0	0	0	0	0	0.1
Average relative humidity (%)	65	59	56	58	63	75	83	84	84	81	76	72	71
Mean monthly sunshine hours	235.8	221.0	229.2	217.7	206.6	141.8	110.0	133.7	133.0	171.6	219.2	238.2	2,257.8
Percentage possible sunshine	71	69	61	57	50	35	26	33	36	49	68	73	52
Source: China Meteorological Administration All-time October highall-time November record high
