= Samatu language =

Moribund Loloish language of China

Samatu
- Native to: China
- Ethnicity: 7,500 (2007)
- Native speakers: 500 (2007)
- Language family: Sino-Tibetan: (Tibeto-Burman); Lolo–Burmese; Loloish; Central; Samatu

Language codes
- ISO 639-3: None (mis)
- Glottolog: sama1296
- ELP: Samatu

Samatu (Samadu) is a moribund Loloish language spoken by older adults in Zhenkang and Yongde counties in Yunnan, China.
