= Dali Bai Autonomous Prefecture =

Dali Prefecture 大理州 · Darl•lit Zox
- Autonomous prefecture
- 大理白族自治州; Darl•lit Baif•cuf zirl•zirl•zox Dali Bai Autonomous Prefecture
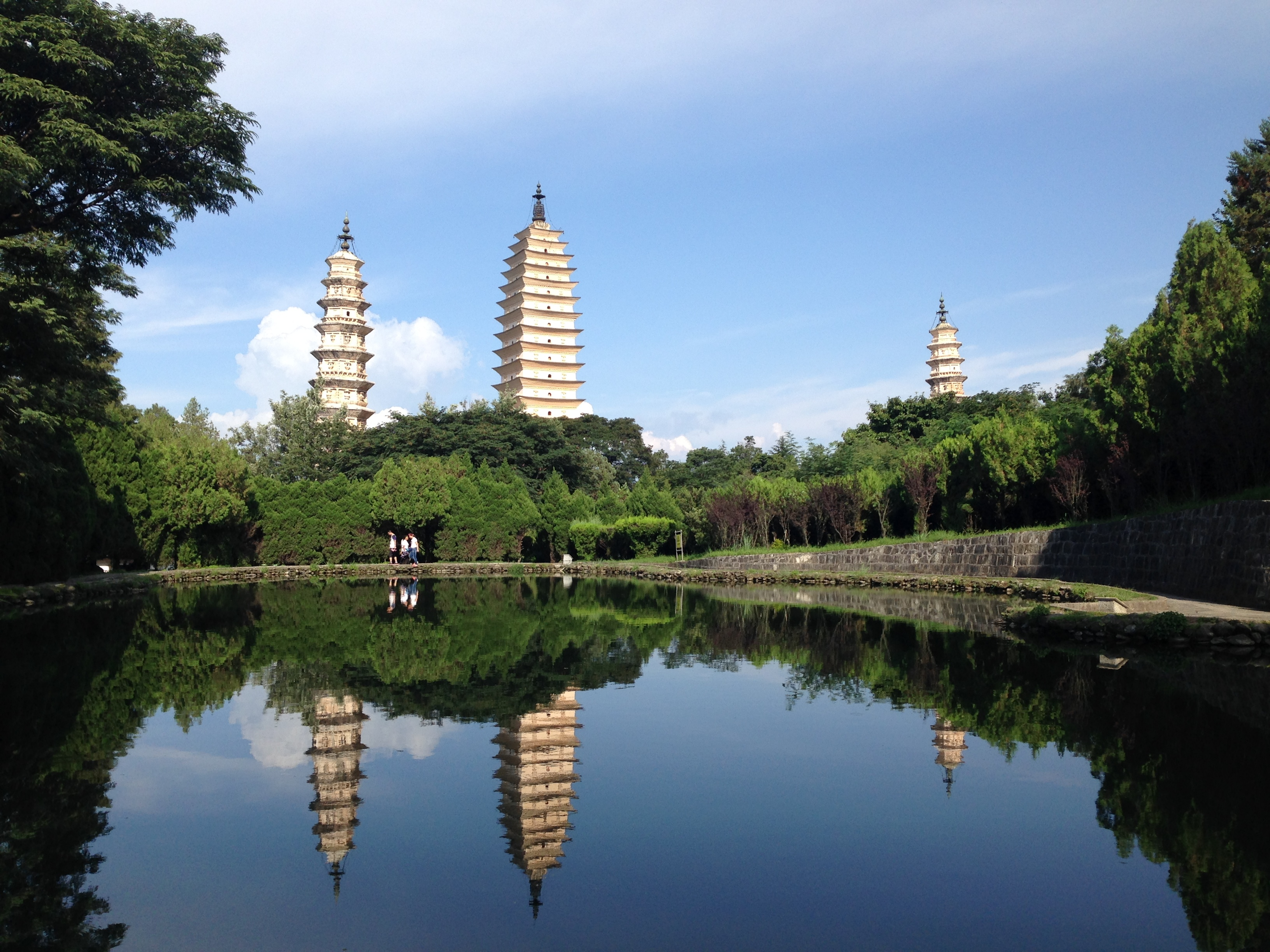
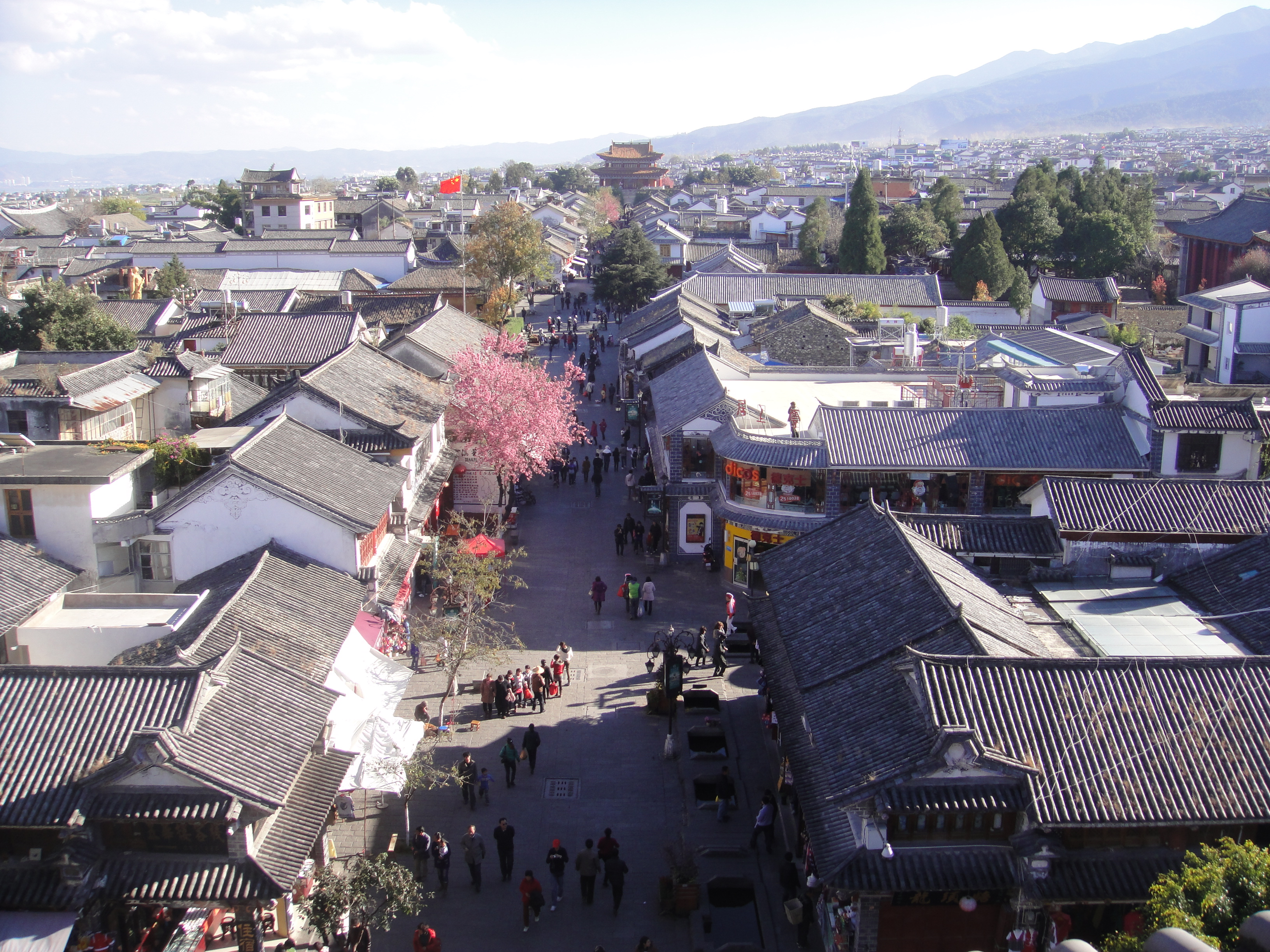
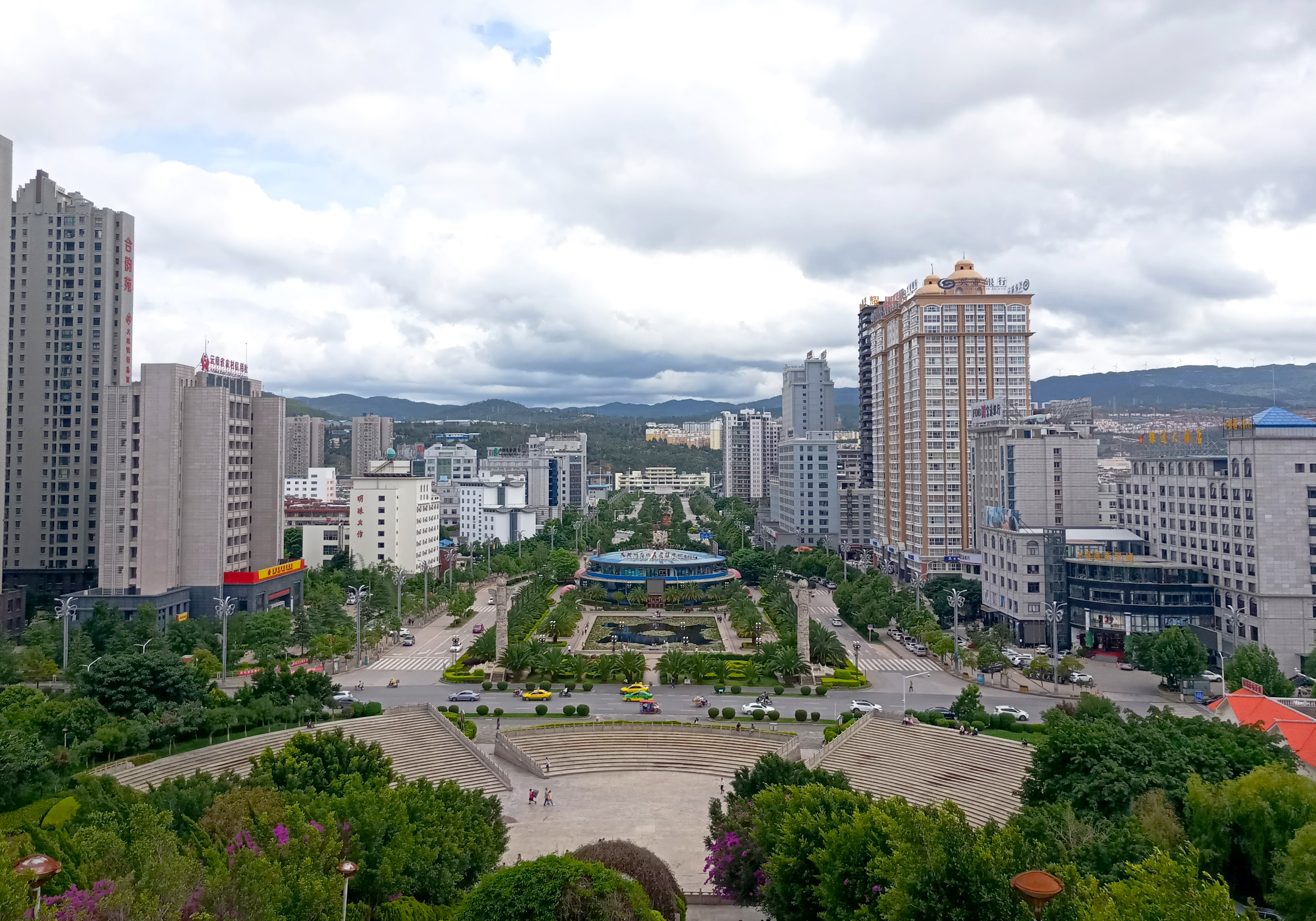
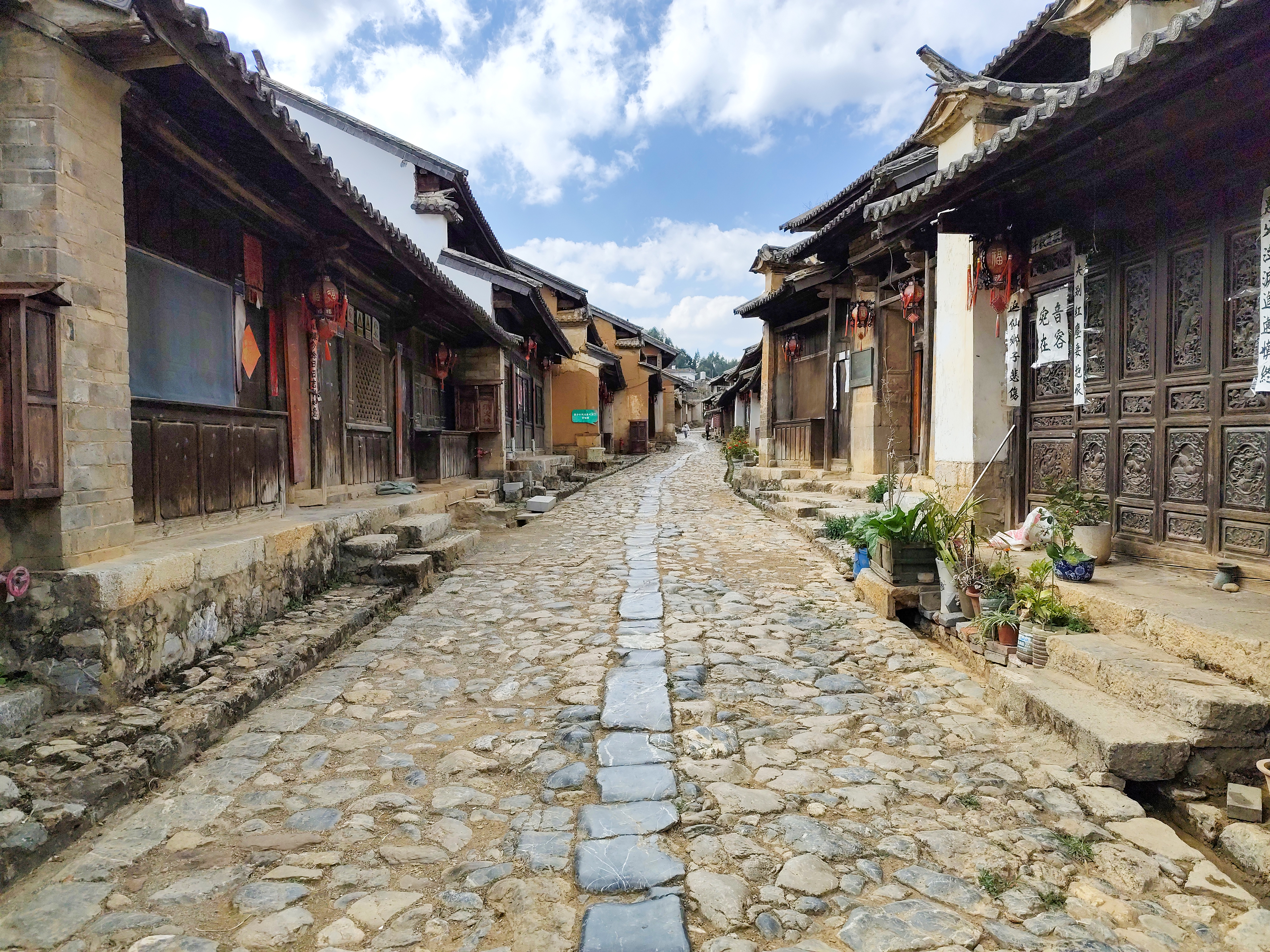
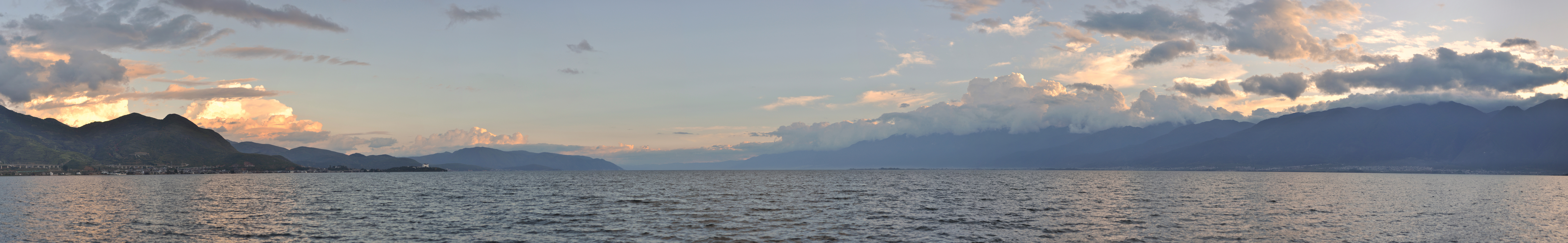
- Three Pagodas Dali Town Downtown Dali Yunnanyi Panorama of Erhai

- Location of Dali Prefecture in Yunnan
- Country: China
- Province: Yunnan
- Admin HQ: Dali

Government
  - Type: Autonomous prefecture
  - CCP Secretary: Yang Guozong
  - Congress Chairman: Zhang Jianping
  - Governor: Yang Guozong
  - CPPCC Chairman: Zhu Jianbin

Area
  - Total: 29,459 km^{2} (11,374 sq mi)

Population (2010)
  - Total: 3,456,000
  - Density: 117.3/km^{2} (303.8/sq mi)

GDP
  - Total: CN¥ 170 billion US$ 25.1 billion
  - Per capita: CN¥ 51,302; US$ 7,567
- Postal code: 671000
- Area code: 0872
- ISO 3166 code: CN-YN-29
- License Plate Prefix: 云L
- Website: http://www.dali.gov.cn/

Dali Bai Autonomous Prefecture (Chinese: 大理白族自治州; pinyin: Dàlǐ Báizú Zìzhìzhōu; Bai: Darl•lit Baif•cuf zirl•zirl•zox) is an autonomous prefecture of northwestern Yunnan Province, People's Republic of China. between longitudes 98°52′ to 101°03′ east and latitudes 24°41′ to 26°42′ north, it has a subtropical plateau monsoon climate with distinct dry and wet seasons. Most areas do not experience extreme heat in summer or severe cold in winter, covering a total area of 29,459 square kilometers. By the end of 2023, the permanent population of the Dali Bai Autonomous Prefecture was 3.342 million people. As of March 2023, the Dali Bai Autonomous Prefecture governed one county-level city and 11 counties, with 110 townships, and the People's Government of the Autonomous Prefecture is based in Xiaguan, Dali City.

The Dali Bai Autonomous Prefecture has a long history. As far back as the Neolithic Age, the ancestors of ethnic minorities such as the Bai people and Yi people and thrived here. During the Tang and Song dynasties, local governments such as the "Kingdom of Nanzhao" and the "Kingdom of Dali" emerged. In 1956, the Dali Bai Autonomous Prefecture was established. The capital, Dali City, is the intersection of the Yunnan-Burma Road and the Yunnan-Tibet Road, historically an important transit point for the "Shu-Sindu Road" and the "Tea Horse Road," and now is planned by Yunnan Province as the central city of Western Yunnan, a regional transportation hub, and the logistics center of Western Yunnan.

The Dali Bai Autonomous Prefecture boasts more than 130 scenic spots and historical sites, including the Buddhist holy land of Mount Jizu, the famous Taoist mountain of Weibaoshan, the magnificent stone carvings of Shibaoshan, and the plateau pearl of Erhai Lake. The Cangshan and Erhai are national-level scenic spots, and "Cangshan Nature and the Cultural Relics of Nanzhao" are dual national natural and cultural heritages.

In 2022, the Dali Bai Autonomous Prefecture achieved a regional gross domestic product (GDP) of 169.96 billion yuan, growing by 2.4% compared to the previous year.

Dali Bai Autonomous Prefecture is bordered by Chuxiong Yi Autonomous Prefecture to the east, Pu'er City and Lincang to the south, Baoshan, Yunnan and Nujiang Lisu Autonomous Prefecture to the west, and Lijiang to the north.

== Historical evolution ==
In the twenty-sixth year of the reign of Emperor Qin Shi Huang (221 BC), the Dali region was incorporated into the unified feudal state of the Qin dynasty.

In the second year of the Yuanfeng (元封) era of the Han dynasty (109 BC), the Western Han dynasty dispatched tens of thousands of soldiers from Ba and Shu to attack the Laojin (劳浸) and Mimu (靡莫) tribes, "advancing with troops to Dian," (以兵临滇) where the "King of Dian" (滇王）submitted to the Han. The Western Han dynasty established the Yizhou Prefecture in the area ruled by the "King of Dian." In the same year, the Han dynasty sent Guo Chang (郭昌) and Wei Guang (卫广) to attack the "Kunming" tribe in the Dali region that had obstructed the Han envoys. In the fourth year of the Yuanfeng era (107 BC) and the sixth year of the Yuanfeng era (105 BC), Guo Chang led troops twice more to attack the "Kunming" tribe, and "a few years later, they also annexed the land of Kunming." Four counties, Ye Yu (叶榆), Yunnan (云南), Xielong (邪龙), and Bisu (比苏), were established in the Dali region, under the jurisdiction of Yizhou Prefecture, and since then, the Dali region was officially incorporated into the territory of the Han dynasty.

During the Eastern Han period, the Dali region was under the jurisdiction of Yongchang (永昌郡) Prefecture, with the four counties of Ye Yu, Xilong, Yunnan, and Bisu established during the Western Han period remaining unchanged, and a new county, Bo Nan (now Yongping County), was added.

During the Three Kingdoms period, what is now Yunnan, Guizhou, and the southwestern part of Sichuan were known as Nan Zhong and were part of the Shu Kingdom.

In the seventh year of the Tai Kai era of the Western Jin dynasty (271 AD), the Jin dynasty divided the four prefectures established by the Shu Han in Nan Zhong, establishing Ning State (宁州).

During the Southern dynasties, as the Central Plains were in a situation of feudal division, Yunnan was successively ruled by the Song, Southern Qi, Liang, Northern Wei, Western Wei, and Northern Zhou dynasties.

In the fifth year of the Kai Huang era of the Sui dynasty (585 AD), Emperor Wen of Sui, Yang Jian, dispatched Wei Chong as the governor of Nan Ning (南宁州) State, and established Gongzhou (恭州), Xiezhou (协州), and Kunzhou (昆州) in Yunnan.

In the fourth year of the Wu De era of the Tang dynasty (621 AD), the Tang sent envoys to the Erhai region to appease the various tribes of the "Kunming" Man. In the seventh year of Wu De (624 AD), the chief commander of the prefecture, Wei Renshou, (韦仁寿) led five hundred soldiers to the Western Erhai River, "by imperial authority, established eight prefectures and seventeen counties, and appointed their leaders as chiefs and governors." From the eighth year of Tianbao (749 AD) to the thirteenth year of Tianbao (754 AD), the "An Lushan rebellion" broke out between the Tang and Nanzhao dynasties. In the following 40 years, Nanzhao continued to expand outward, expanding its territory and establishing a multi-ethnic state that included eastern Guizhou, northern Vietnam, southern Xishuangbanna, northern Myanmar, northwestern Tibet's Shenchuan (神川) (now Lijiang), and northeast to Xuzhou (戌州) (now Yibin) in Sichuan.

In the second year of Tianfu of the Later Jin dynasty (937 AD), Duan Siping, the military governor of Tonghai of the Later Jin, joined forces with the thirty-seven eastern regions to march on Dali, overthrew the Dayining Kingdom (大义宁国), and established the Dali Kingdom.

In the first year of the Baoyou era of the Southern Song dynasty (1253 AD), Kublai Khan led the central road army, crossed the Dadu River, "traveled through the mountains and valleys for more than 2000 miles," passing through present-day Yanyuan and Yongsheng, and directly reached the Jinsha River, "crossing by leather bags and rafts," arriving in the territory of Lijiang today. Kublai Khan led his troops to capture Jianchuan and Heqing, and pressed on to Dali City from Shangguan. The city was broken, the Prime Minister of Dali, Gao Xiang (高祥), was killed, and the King of Dali, Duan Xingzhi (段兴智), fled to the Dian Lake area. In the second year of Baoyou (1254 AD), Uriangqada continued to march, successively pacifying the five cities, eight prefectures, four counties, and 37 departments of the Bai and Black Man of the Dali Kingdom, and captured the King of Dali, Duan Xingzhi, in Kunze (昆泽) (now Yiliang), and the Dali Kingdom fell.

Map
#	Name	Simplified Chinese	Hanyu Pinyin	Population (2010)	Area (km^{2})	Density (/km^{2})
1	Dali City	大理市	Dàlǐ Shì	652,000	1,468	444
2	Xiangyun County	祥云县	Xiángyún Xiàn	456,000	2,498	183
3	Binchuan County	宾川县	Bīnchuān Xiàn	349,000	2,627	133
4	Midu County	弥渡县	Mídù Xiàn	313,000	1,571	199
5	Yongping County	永平县	Yǒngpíng Xiàn	175,000	2,884	61
6	Yunlong County	云龙县	Yúnlóng Xiàn	200,000	4,712	42
7	Eryuan County	洱源县	Ěryuán Xiàn	268,000	2,961	91
8	Jianchuan County	剑川县	Jiànchuān Xiàn	170,000	2,318	73
9	Heqing County	鹤庆县	Hèqìng Xiàn	255,000	2,395	106
10	Yangbi Yi Autonomous County	漾濞彝族自治县	Yàngbì Yízú Zìzhìxiàn	102,000	1,957	52
11	Nanjian Yi Autonomous County	南涧彝族自治县	Nánjiàn Yízú Zìzhìxiàn	212,000	1,802	118
12	Weishan Yi and Hui Autonomous County	巍山彝族回族自治县	Wēishān Yízú Huízú Zìzhìxiàn	304,000	2,266	134

== Demography ==
Ethnic groups in Dali, 2000 census

Ethnicity	Population	Percentage
Han	1,659,730	50.35%
Bai	1,081,167	32.8%
Yi	426,634	12.94%
Hui	66,085	2.0%
Lisu	31,972	0.97%
Miao	10,967	0.33%
Naxi	4,302	0.13%
Achang	3,330	0.1%
Others	12,365	0.38%
Total	3,296,552

== Local holidays ==
In addition to the national public holidays observed throughout China, Dali prefecture has local public holidays.

Dali is the cultural center of the Bai people and was the capital of the ancient Nanzhao and Dali kingdoms. The Third Month Fair (三月街) is a major traditional festival.

Residents get three days off, from the 15th to the 17th day of the third month of the Chinese calendar, for the Third Month Fair (三月街), a traditional festival of the Bai people. Residents also get two days off, on November 22 and 23, for the Anniversary of the Establishment of the Autonomous Prefecture (自治州成立纪念日).
