= Longyang, Baoshan =

Longyang 隆阳区
- District
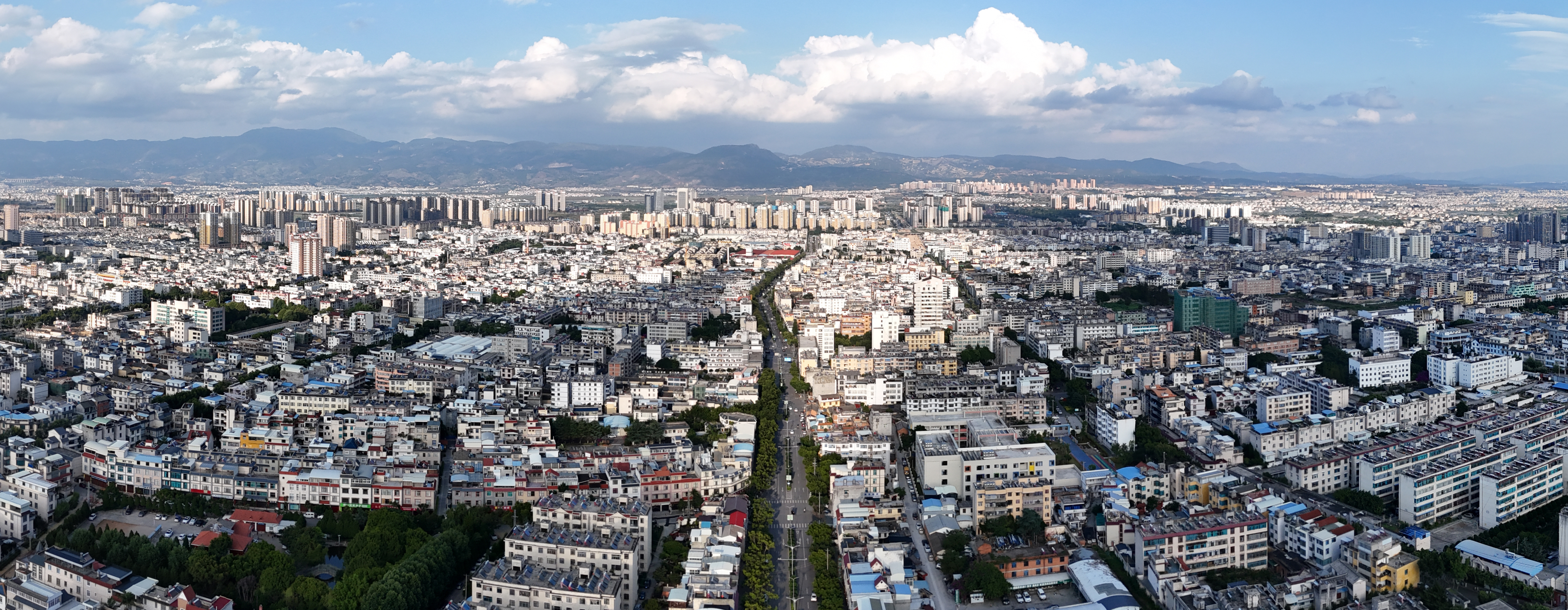
- Downtown skyline

- Location of Longyang District (red) and Baoshan Prefecture (pink) within Yunnan province of China

- Location within China Longyang (China)
- Coordinates: 25°06′14″N 99°09′29″E
- Country: China
- Province: Yunnan
- Prefecture-level city: Baoshan
- District seat: Jiulong Subdistrict

Area
  - Total: 5,011 km^{2} (1,935 sq mi)

Population (2020 census)
  - Total: 903,081
  - Density: 180.2/km^{2} (466.8/sq mi)
- Postal code: 678000
- Area code: 0875
- Website: www.longyang.gov.cn

Longyang District (simplified Chinese: 隆阳区; traditional Chinese: 隆陽區; pinyin: Lóngyáng Qū) is a district of the city of Baoshan, Yunnan province, China. It borders Yongping County and Changning County to the east, Shidian County and Longling County to the south, Tengchong to the west, and Lushui and Yunlong County to the north.

== Administrative divisions ==
Longyang District has 6 subdistricts, 5 towns, 6 townships and 4 ethnic townships.

6 subdistricts

- Lancheng (兰城街道)
- Yongchang (永昌街道)
- Jiulong (九隆街道)
- Qinghua (青华街道)
- Hetu (河图街道)
- Yongsheng (永盛街道)

5 towns

- Banqiao (板桥镇)
- Hanzhuang (汉庄镇)
- Puzhen (蒲缥镇)
- Wayao (瓦窑镇)
- Lujiang (潞江镇)

6 townships

- Jinji (金鸡乡)
- Xinjie (辛街乡)
- Xiyi (西邑乡)
- Bingma (丙麻乡)
- Wadu (瓦渡乡)
- Shuizhai (水寨乡)

4 ethnic townships

- Wama Yi and Bai Ethnic Township (瓦马彝族白族乡)
- Wafang Yi and Miao Ethnic Township (瓦房彝族苗族乡)
- Yangliu Bai and Yi Ethnic Township (杨柳白族彝族乡)
- Mangkuan Yi and Dai Ethnic Township (芒宽彝族傣族乡)

== Ethnic groups ==
The Yaojing 尧净, a subgroup of the De'ang, are located in Baizhai 白寨, Laxian 拉线, and Dagoubian 大沟边 of Mangyan Village 芒颜村 and Shiti Village 石梯村 in Lujiang Township 潞江乡, Longyang District (Baoshan Ethnic Gazetteer 2006:490-491).

== Mineral resources ==
- 'Chlorite group'
- Cinnabar
- Dolomite
- Galena
- Pyrite
- Pyrrhotite
- Sphalerite
