= Bixi Township, Nanjian County =

Bixi Township 碧溪乡
- Township
- Location in Yunnan.
- Coordinates: 24°55′06″N 100°17′13″E
- Country: People's Republic of China
- Province: Yunnan
- Autonomous prefecture: Dali Bai Autonomous Prefecture
- Autonomous county: Nanjian Yi Autonomous County
- Incorporated (township): 1988

Area
  - Total: 124.88 km^{2} (48.22 sq mi)

Population (2020)
  - Total: 18,429
  - Density: 147.57/km^{2} (382.21/sq mi)
- Time zone: UTC+08:00 (China Standard)
- Postal code: 654802
- Area code: 0872

Bixi Township (simplified Chinese: 碧溪乡; traditional Chinese: 碧溪鄉; pinyin: Bìxī Zhèn) is a township that is located in Nanjian Yi Autonomous County, Yunnan, China. As of the 2020 census it had a population of 18,429 and an area of 124.88-square-kilometre (48.22 sq mi).

== Administrative division ==
As of 2018, the town is divided into eight villages:

- Zhonghua (中华村)
- Songlin (松林村)
- Xingzishan (杏子山村)
- Huilongshan (回龙山村)
- Yongning (永宁村)
- Xinhu (新虎村)
- Hele (和乐村)
- Fengxian (凤仙村)

== History ==
During the Great Leap Forward, it known as "Bixi Commune" (碧溪公社) in 1958. It was incorporated as a township in 1988.

== Geography ==
It lies at the southwestern of Nanjian Yi Autonomous County, bordering Fengqing County to the west, the towns of Gonglang and Xiaowandong to the south, Leqiu Township and Weishan Yi and Hui Autonomous County to the north, and Yongcui Township to the east.

The highest point is Fenghuang Mountain (凤凰山; 'Phoenix Mountain'), elevation 2,514 metres (8,248 ft). The lowest point is the Peacock Ferry Terminal (孔雀轮渡码头), which, at 1,050 metres (3,440 ft) above sea level.

== Economy ==
The economy is supported primarily by farming, ranching and mineral resources. The region mainly produce tea, tobacco, and Juglans sigillata. The region also has an abundance of gold, copper, iron, limestone, and molybdenum.

== Demographics ==
Population census
Year	Pop.	±%
2005	18,176	—
2020	18,429	+1.4%

As of 2020, the National Bureau of Statistics of China estimates the township's population now to be 18,429.

== Transportation ==
The township is crossed by the China National Highway G214.

The township is connected to the Dali–Lincang railway.
