= Xiaowandong =

Xiaowandong Town 小湾东镇
- Town
- Location in Yunnan.
- Coordinates: 24°48′19″N 100°12′48″E
- Country: People's Republic of China
- Province: Yunnan
- Autonomous prefecture: Dali Bai Autonomous Prefecture
- Autonomous county: Nanjian Yi Autonomous County
- Designated (town): 1988

Area
  - Total: 204.44 km^{2} (78.93 sq mi)

Population (2020)
  - Total: 18,431
  - Density: 90.154/km^{2} (233.50/sq mi)
- Time zone: UTC+08:00 (China Standard)
- Postal code: 675702
- Area code: 0872

Xiaowandong (simplified Chinese: 小湾东镇; traditional Chinese: 小灣東鎮; pinyin: Xiǎowāndōng Zhèn) is a town in Nanjian Yi Autonomous County, Yunnan, China. As of the 2020 census it had a population of 18,431 and an area of 204.44-square-kilometre (78.93 sq mi).

== Administrative division ==
As of 2018, the town is divided into seven villages:

- Shenzhou (神舟村)
- Yingpan (营盘村)
- Longjie (龙街村)
- Xinlong (新龙村)
- Xinmin (新民村)
- Longmen (龙门村)
- Chajiang (岔江村)

== History ==
During the Great Leap Forward, it known as "Chajiang Commune" (岔江公社) in 1958. It was upgraded to a town in 1988.

== Geography ==
The town is located in the southwest of Nanjian Yi Autonomous County, bordering Fengqing County and Yun County to the southwest, and Gonglang Town and Bixi Township to the northeast.

The highest point in the town is Walang Mountain (瓦郎山) which stands 2,448 metres (8,031 ft) above sea level. The lowest point is Manwan (漫湾库区), which, at 994 metres (3,261 ft) above sea level.

The Lancang River and Heihui River (黑惠河) meet in the town.

== Economy ==
The local economy is primarily based upon agriculture and animal husbandry. Economic crops are mainly tobacco, tea, Juglans sigillata, and persimmon.

== Demographics ==
Population census
Year	Pop.	±%
2005	18,723	—
2020	18,431	−1.6%

As of 2020, the National Bureau of Statistics of China estimates the town's population now to be 18,431.

== Transportation ==
Dali–Lincang railway: Xiaowan East railway station, opened November 6, 2021.
