= Leqiu Township =

Leqiu Township 乐秋乡
- Township
- Location in Yunnan.
- Coordinates: 24°59′23″N 100°20′04″E
- Country: People's Republic of China
- Province: Yunnan
- Autonomous prefecture: Dali Bai Autonomous Prefecture
- Autonomous county: Nanjian Yi Autonomous County
- Incorporated (township): 1988

Area
  - Total: 163.26 km^{2} (63.04 sq mi)
- Elevation: 1,910 m (6,270 ft)

Population (2020)
  - Total: 18,099
  - Density: 110.86/km^{2} (287.13/sq mi)
- Time zone: UTC+08:00 (China Standard)
- Postal code: 675705
- Area code: 0872

Leqiu Township (simplified Chinese: 乐秋乡; traditional Chinese: 樂秋鄉; pinyin: Lèqiū Zhèn) is a township in Nanjian Yi Autonomous County, Yunnan, China. As of the 2020 census it had a population of 18,099 and an area of 163.26-square-kilometre (63.04 sq mi).

== Administrative division ==
As of 2018, the town is divided into seven villages:

- Mijialu (米家禄村)
- Dongsheng (东升村)
- Leqiu (乐秋村)
- Mali (麻栗村)
- Lianhe (联合村)
- Shanghu (上虎村)
- Zhujie (猪街村)

== History ==
During the Great Leap Forward, it known as "Leqiu Commune" (乐秋公社) in 1958. It was incorporated as a township in 1988.

== Geography ==
The township is situated at northwestern Nanjian Yi Autonomous County, bordering Bixi Township to the west, Yongcui Township to the south, Weishan Yi and Hui Autonomous County to the north, and Nanjian Town to the east.

The highest point is the Xinshan Temple (新山寺), elevation 2,705 metres (8,875 ft). The lowest point is hebiandui (河边队), which, at 2,705 metres (8,875 ft) above sea level.

== Economy ==
The region's economy is based on agriculture. Significant crops include grain, wheat, and corn. Commercial crops include tobacco, tea, bean, and Juglans sigillata.

== Demographics ==
Population census
Year	Pop.	±%
2005	18,184	—
2020	18,099	−0.5%

As of 2020, the National Bureau of Statistics of China estimates the township's population now to be 18,099.

== Transportation ==
The China National Highway G214 passes across the township.

The township is connected to the Dali–Lincang railway.
