= Wuliangshan =

Wuliangshan Town 无量山镇
- Town
- Location in Yunnan.
- Coordinates: 24°48′18″N 100°33′20″E
- Country: People's Republic of China
- Province: Yunnan
- Autonomous prefecture: Dali Bai Autonomous Prefecture
- Autonomous county: Nanjian Yi Autonomous County

Area
  - Total: 248.62 km^{2} (95.99 sq mi)

Population (2020)
  - Total: 37,063
  - Density: 149.07/km^{2} (386.10/sq mi)
- Time zone: UTC+08:00 (China Standard)
- Postal code: 675707
- Area code: 0872

Wuliangshan (simplified Chinese: 无量山镇; traditional Chinese: 無量山鎮; pinyin: Wúliàngshān Zhèn) is a town in Nanjian Yi Autonomous County, Yunnan, China. As of the 2020 census it had a population of 37,063 and an area of 248.62-square-kilometre (95.99 sq mi). It is known as "Hometown of Tea" (茶乡) in Yunnan.

== Administrative division ==
As of 2018, the town is divided into thirteen villages:

- Guangming (光明村)
- Baoping (保平村)
- De'an (德安村)
- Xinzheng (新政村)
- Gude (古德村)
- Majie (马街村)
- Kebao (可保村)
- Weiguo (卫国村)
- Hongxing (红星村)
- Fada (发达村)
- Baotai (保台村)
- Heping (和平村)
- Huashan (华山村)

== Geography ==
The town is situated at southeastern Nanjian Yi Autonomous County. It is surrounded by Baohua Town on the north, Gonglang Town on the west, Midu County on the east, and Jingdong Yi Autonomous County on the south.

The highest point in the town is Taiping Mountain (太平山) which stands 2,790 metres (9,150 ft) above sea level. The lowest point is Nanjian Bridge (南涧桥), which, at 1,446 metres (4,744 ft) above sea level.

== Economy ==
The region's economy is based on agriculture, tourism, and forestry. Tea, tobacco, Juglans sigillata, bean are the economic plants of this region. The region abounds with copper, iron, lead, coal and zinc.

== Demographics ==
Population census
Year	Pop.	±%
2005	35,702	—
2020	37,063	+3.8%

As of 2020, the National Bureau of Statistics of China estimates the town's population now to be 37,063.

== Tourist attractions ==
The Lingbaoshan National Forest Park (灵宝山国家森林公园) is located in the town.

== Transportation ==
The town is crossed by the National Highway G214 and the Xiao-Pu Provincial Highway.
