= Yongcui Township =

Yongcui Township 拥翠乡
- Township
- Location in Yunnan.
- Coordinates: 24°55′57″N 100°22′51″E
- Country: People's Republic of China
- Province: Yunnan
- Autonomous prefecture: Dali Bai Autonomous Prefecture
- Autonomous county: Nanjian Yi Autonomous County
- Incorporated (township): 1988

Area
  - Total: 118.12 km^{2} (45.61 sq mi)

Population (2020)
  - Total: 20,805
  - Density: 176.13/km^{2} (456.19/sq mi)
- Time zone: UTC+08:00 (China Standard)
- Postal code: 675704
- Area code: 0872

Yongcui Township (simplified Chinese: 拥翠乡; traditional Chinese: 擁翠鄉; pinyin: Yōngcuì Zhèn) is a township in Nanjian Yi Autonomous County, Yunnan, China. As of the 2020 census it had a population of 20,805 and an area of 118.12-square-kilometre (45.61 sq mi).

== Administrative division ==
As of 2018, the town is divided into seven villages:

- Yongcui (拥翠村)
- Longfeng (龙凤村)
- Anli (安立村)
- Shengli (胜利村)
- Wenquan (温泉村)
- Jiumajie (旧马街村)
- Xinhua (新华村)

== History ==
During the Great Leap Forward, it known as "Yongcui Commune" (拥翠公社) in 1958. It was incorporated as a township in 1988.

== Geography ==
The township is situated at central Nanjian Yi Autonomous County. It borders Nanjian Town in the north, Baohua Town in the east, Gonglang Town in the south, and Leqiu Township and Bixi Township in the west.

The highest point is Anlixin Mountain (安立新山), elevation 2,313.6 metres (7,591 ft). The lowest point is the river bottom of Qin Family Village (秦家村河底), which, at 1,600 metres (5,200 ft) above sea level.

== Economy ==
The region's economy is based on agriculture and animal husbandry. The region mainly produce tea, tobacco, and Juglans sigillata. The region also has an abundance of copper, nickel and iron.

== Demographics ==
Population census
Year	Pop.	±%
2005	20,835	—
2020	20,805	−0.1%

As of 2020, the National Bureau of Statistics of China estimates the township's population now to be 20,805.

== Transportation ==
The township is crossed by the China National Highway G214 and the Shanghai–Nanjing Expressway.
