= Boshang =

Town in Yunnan, China

Boshang 博尚镇
- Town
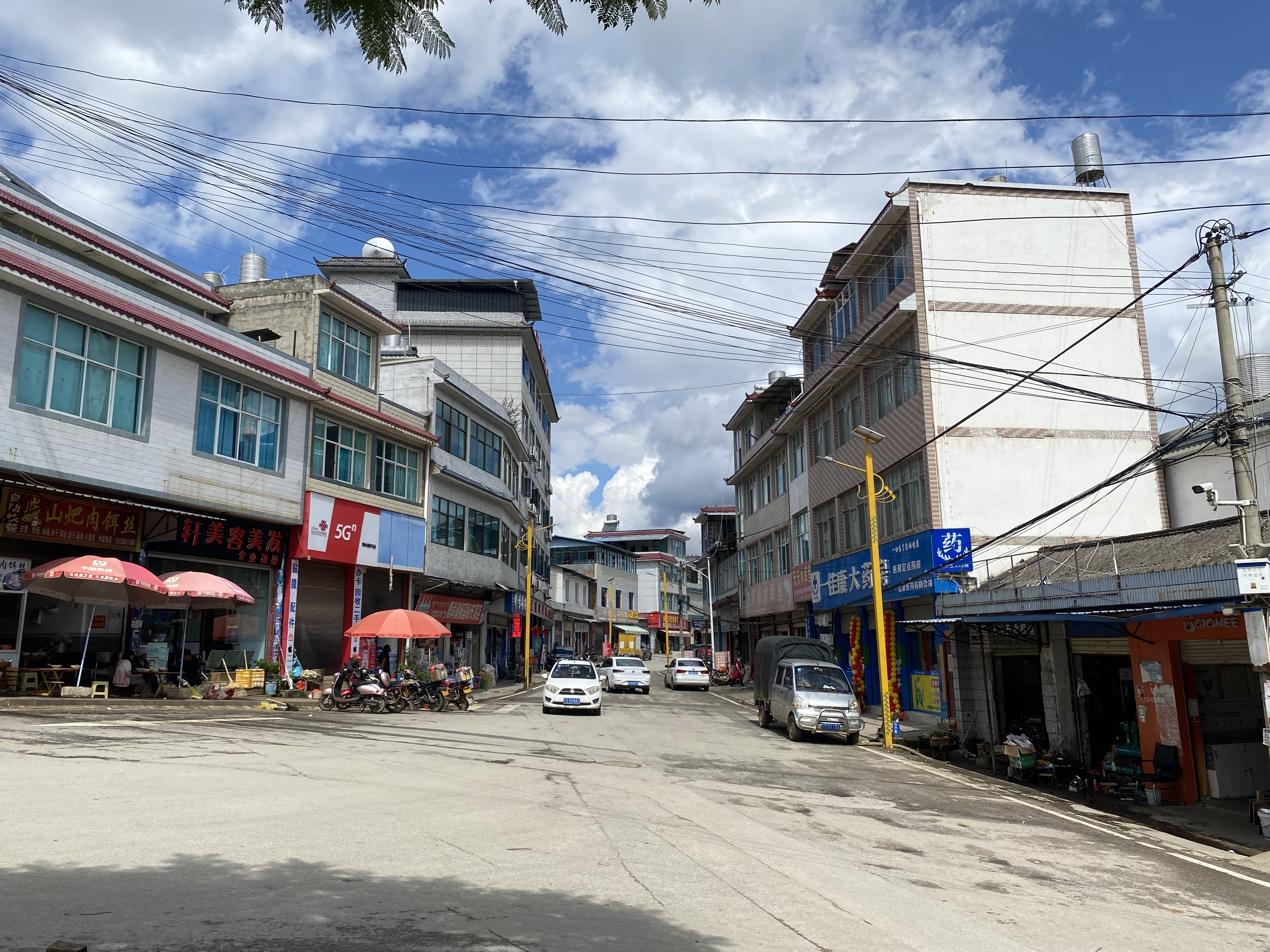
- Taiheng Road, Boshang

- Location in Yunnan
- Coordinates: 23°43′23″N 100°03′19″E
- Country: People's Republic of China
- Province: Yunnan
- Prefecture-level city: Lincang
- District: Linxiang
- Time zone: UTC+8 (China Standard)

Boshang is a town in Linxiang District, Lincang, Yunnan, China, with 36,800 residents and an elevation of 2,226 meters. Boshang is situated south of Lincang city and northwest of Quannei Township. The Lincang Boshang Airport located in the town.
