= Nanjian =

Nanjian, may refer to:

- Nanjian Yi Autonomous County, an autonomous county in Dali Bai Autonomous Prefecture, Yunnan, China
- Nanjian Town, a town in Nanjian Yi Autonomous County, Yunnan, China
