= Gonglang =

Gonglang Town 公郎镇
- Town
- Location in Yunnan.
- Coordinates: 24°50′21″N 100°18′44″E
- Country: People's Republic of China
- Province: Yunnan
- Autonomous prefecture: Dali Bai Autonomous Prefecture
- Autonomous county: Nanjian Yi Autonomous County
- Incorporated (township): 1988
- Designated (town): 2000

Area
  - Total: 277.78 km^{2} (107.25 sq mi)

Population (2020)
  - Total: 32,719
  - Density: 117.79/km^{2} (305.07/sq mi)
- Time zone: UTC+08:00 (China Standard)
- Postal code: 675701
- Area code: 0872

Gonglang (simplified Chinese: 公郎镇; traditional Chinese: 公郎鎮; pinyin: Gōngláng Zhèn) is a town in Nanjian Yi Autonomous County, Yunnan, China. As of the 2020 census it had a population of 32,719 and an area of 277.78-square-kilometre (107.25 sq mi). It is known as "Hometown of Tea", "Hometown of Walnut", and "Hometown of Citron".

== Administrative division ==
As of 2018, the town is divided into fourteen villages:

- Xinhe (新合村)
- Zhongshan (中山村)
- Dime (底么村)
- Fenghuang (凤凰村; 'Phoenix')
- Fengling (凤岭村)
- Huiying (回营村)
- Gonglang (公郎村)
- Longping (龙平村)
- Jinshan (金山村; 'Golden Mountain')
- Banqiao (板桥村)
- Guandi (官地村)
- Shale (沙乐村)
- Ziqiang (自强村)
- Luodihe (落底河村)

== History ==
The first dynasty to rule Gonglang was the Tang dynasty (618–907), beginning in the 7th century. It came under the jurisdiction of Langcang Xunjiansi (浪沧巡检司) in mid-Ming dynasty (1368–1644). In 1729, in the ruling of Yongzheng Emperor of the Qing dynasty (1644–1911), it was under the jurisdiction of Jingmeng (景蒙).

In 1914, the Nanjian Xunjiansi (南涧巡检司) was set up. In 1940, Langcang Town (浪沧镇) was formed.

During the Great Leap Forward, it was renamed "Gonglang Commune" (公郎公社) in 1958. It was incorporated as a township in 1988. In 2000, Langcang Township (浪沧乡) was revoked and Gonglang was upgraded to a town.

== Geography ==
It lies at the southwestern of Nanjian Yi Autonomous County, bordering the towns of Wuliangshan, Xiaowandong, Baohua, townships of Bixi and Yongcui, Yun County, Fengqing County, and Jingdong Yi Autonomous County.

== Economy ==
The town's main industries are agriculture. Economic crops are mainly tea, walnut, and potato.

== Demographics ==
Population census
Year	Pop.	±%
2005	31,033	—
2017	30,737	−1.0%
2020	32,719	+6.4%

As of 2020, the National Bureau of Statistics of China estimates the town's population now to be 32,719.

== Tourist attractions ==
The Jade Emperor Pavilion (玉皇阁) is a Taoist temple in the town, and the Guanyin Hall (观音殿) is a Buddhist temple. The Land God Temple (土主庙) is a temple of folk belief for Yi people. The Gonglang Mosque (公郎清真寺) was originally built in the Jiaqing period of the Qing dynasty (1644–1911).

== Transportation ==
he National Highway G214 passes across the town north to south.
