= Linxiang County =

Linxiang County is the atonal pinyin romanization of various Chinese names.

It may refer to:

- Linxiang County (临湘县), a former name of territory now administered as part of Changsha in Hunan
- Linxiang County (临翔县), a former name of Linxiang District in Lincang Prefecture, Yunnan Province, China
