= Baohua, Nanjian County =

Baohua Town 宝华镇
- Town
- Location in Yunnan.
- Coordinates: 24°54′34″N 100°29′22″E
- Country: People's Republic of China
- Province: Yunnan
- Autonomous prefecture: Dali Bai Autonomous Prefecture
- Autonomous county: Nanjian Yi Autonomous County
- Designated (town): 1988

Area
  - Total: 215.2 km^{2} (83.1 sq mi)

Population (2020)
  - Total: 31,566
  - Density: 146.7/km^{2} (379.9/sq mi)
- Time zone: UTC+08:00 (China Standard)
- Postal code: 675706
- Area code: 0872

Baohua (simplified Chinese: 宝华镇; traditional Chinese: 寶華鎮; pinyin: Bǎohuá Zhèn) is a town in Nanjian Yi Autonomous County, Yunnan, China. As of the 2020 census it had a population of 31,566 and an area of 215.2-square-kilometre (83.1 sq mi).

== Administrative division ==
As of 2018, the town is divided into ten villages:

- Baohua (宝华村)
- Yunhua (云华村)
- Meixing (美星村; 'Beautiful Star')
- Tujie (兔街村; 'Rabbit Street')
- Guangle (光乐村)
- Baizhu (白竹村; 'White Bamboo')
- Yongzheng (拥政村)
- Xiaotieyao (小铁窑村; 'Little Iron Kiln')
- Hujie (虎街村; 'Tiger Street')
- Wuliang (无量村)

== History ==
During the Great Leap Forward, it known as "Baohua Commune" (宝华公社). It was upgraded to a town in 1988.

== Geography ==
The town is situated at eastern Nanjian Yi Autonomous County. The town is bordered to the north by Nanjian Town, to the east by Midu County and Wuliangshan Town, to the south by Gonglang Town, and to the west by Yongcui Township.

The highest point in the town is Baju Mountain (巴苴山) which stands 2,693 metres (8,835 ft) above sea level. The lowest point is the river valley of Stone Cave Temple (石洞寺河谷地), which, at 1,730 metres (5,680 ft) above sea level.

The Dalongtan Reservoir (大龙潭水库; 'Grand Dragon Pool Reservoir') is located in the town.

The town experiences a subtropical monsoon climate, with an average annual temperature of 18.7 °C (65.7 °F), total annual rainfall of 957.8-millimetre (37.71 in), and annual average sunshine hours in 2296.1 hours.

== Economy ==
The principal industries in the area are agriculture. Tobacco, walnut, bean are the economic plants of this region. Food crops are mainly rice, wheat, and barley. The region abounds with iron and copper.

== Demographics ==
Population census
Year	Pop.	±%
2005	30,447	—
2017	31,435	+3.2%
2020	31,566	+0.4%

As of 2020, the National Bureau of Statistics of China estimates the town's population now to be 31,566.

== Tourist attractions ==
The Stone Cave Temple (石洞寺) is a Buddhist temple located in the town, it was originally built in late Ming (1368–1644) and early Qing dynasties (1644–1911).

== Transportation ==
The National Highway G214 passes across the town north to south.

The S37 Hu-Ning Expressway is a north–south highway passing through the western town.
