= Linxiang, Lincang =

Linxiang 临翔区
- District
- Location of Linxiang District (red) and Lincang Prefecture (pink) within Yunnan province of China

- Location within China Linxiang (China)
- Coordinates: 23°53′49″N 100°04′59″E
- Country: China
- Province: Yunnan
- Prefecture-level city: Lincang
- District seat: Fengxiang Subdistrict

Area
  - Total: 2,652 km^{2} (1,024 sq mi)

Population (2020 census)
  - Total: 370,947
  - Density: 139.9/km^{2} (362.3/sq mi)
- Postal code: 677000
- Area code: 0883
- Website: www.ynlx.gov.cn

Linxiang District (simplified Chinese: 临翔区; traditional Chinese: 臨翔區; pinyin: Línxiáng Qū) is a district of the city of Lincang, Yunnan province, China. It borders Jingdong County, Zhenyuan County and Jinggu County to the east, Shuangjiang County to the south, Gengma County to the west, and Yun County to the north.

== History ==
=== Saophas ===
The Saopha of Mong Myen system began in 1385, with the first Saopha being a descendant of the Mäo Long migrating group. At present, it is the district of Mong Myen. Lahu Wa Autonomous Region Shuangjiang, Linchang Province, Yunnan State, China (in ancient times was the kingdom of the Tai Yai people), there are 25 Saophas in total as follows:

Saophas:

- Hkam Tai Hpa 1385-1421
- Hso Hkan Mei 1421-1448
- Hkam Kyeng Hpa 1448-1448 (6 months)
- Kan Lang Hpa (Hkam Hting) 1448-1477
- Hkam Perd Hpa 1477-1499
- Hkam Laing Hpa (Sao Hkam Laing) 1499-1528
- Hkam Kyoum Hpa 1528-1547
- Hkam Khin Hpa 1547-1575
- Hkam Man Hpa 1575-1599
- Hkam Ting Hpa 1599-1624
- Hkam King Hpa 1624-1651
- Hkam Kyaung Hpa 1651-1673
- Hkam Baw Hpa 1673-1691
- Hkam Sai Hpa 1691-1715
- Hkam Hkoeng Hpa 1715-1745
- Hkam Htord Hpa 1745-1769
- Hkam Ku Hpa 1769-1801
- Sao Kyaum Hkam 1801-1813
- Hkam Kaw Hpa 1813-1842
- Hkam Hkoeng Hpa 1842-1851
- Hkam Tung Hpa 1851-1866
- Hkam Oung Hpa 1866-1887
- Hkam Hsawng Hpa 1887-1905
- Hpa Lung Tai Pang 1905-1917
- Hkam Hub Hpa 1917-1930 (the last saopha)

== Administrative divisions ==
Linxiang District has 2 subdistricts, 1 town, 5 townships and 2 ethnic townships.

2 subdistricts

- Fengxiang (凤翔街道)
- Mangpan (忙畔街道)

1 town

- Boshang (博尚镇)

5 townships

- Mayidui (蚂蚁堆乡)
- Zhangtuo (章驮乡)
- Quannei (圈内乡)
- Matai (马台乡)
- Bangdong (邦东乡)

2 ethnic townships

- Nanmei Lahu (南美拉祜族乡)
- Pingcun Yi and Dai (平村彝族傣族乡)

== Transportation ==
Lincang Airport is located here, as is Lincang railway station, the southern terminus of the Dali–Lincang railway.
