= Cangyuan Washan Airport =

Chinese airport

Cangyuan Washan Airport 沧源佤山机场
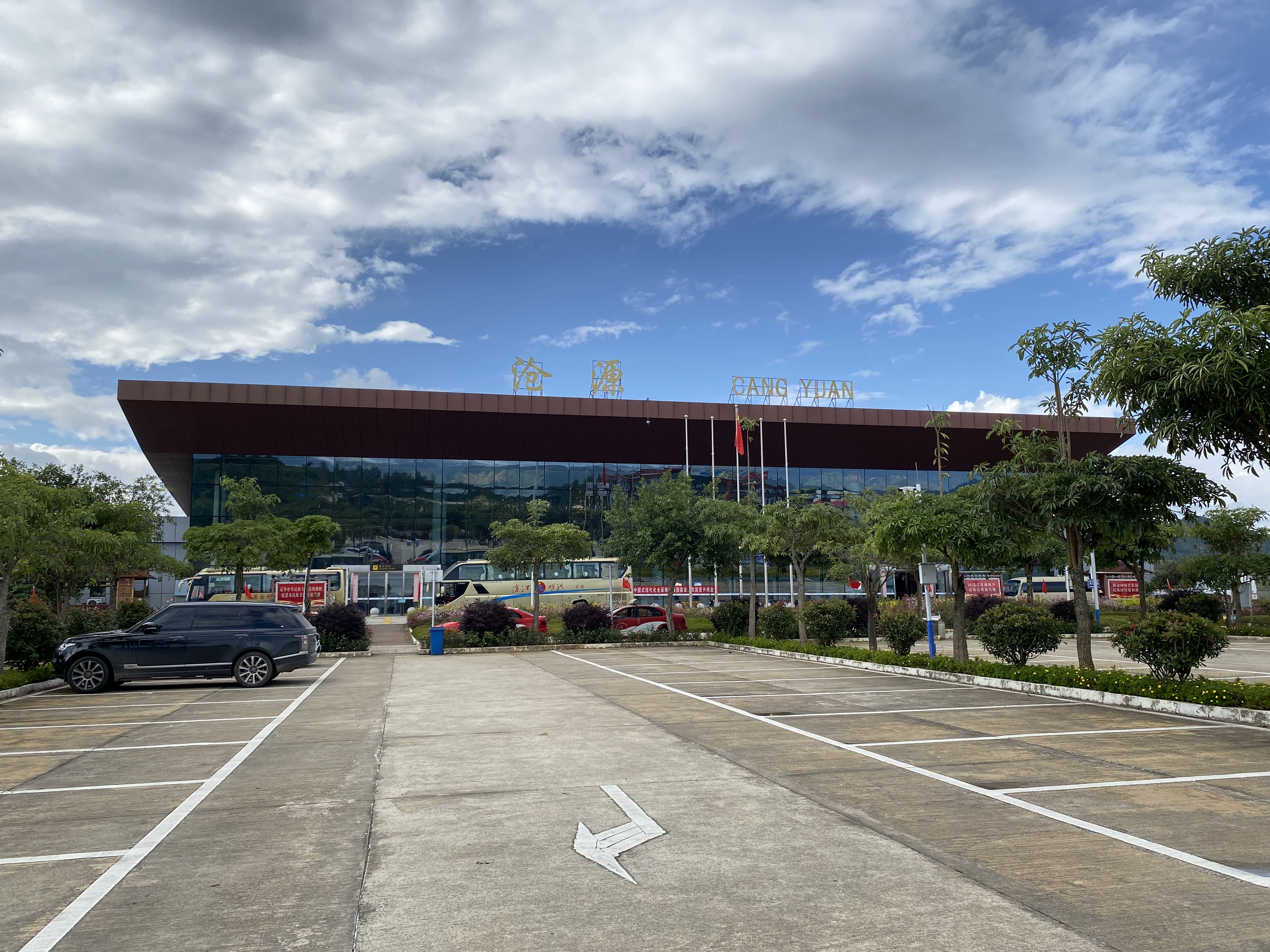
- IATA: CWJ; ICAO: ZPCW

Summary
- Airport type: Public
- Serves: Cangyuan, Yunnan
- Location: Nuoliang Township
- Opened: 8 December 2016; 9 years ago
- Coordinates: 23°16′17″N 99°22′05″E

Map
- Location of airport in Yunnan

Runways
Direction	Length		Surface
Direction	m	ft	Surface
05/23	2,600	8,530	concrete

Statistics (2021)
- Passengers: 224,294
- Aircraft movements: 2,636
- Cargo (metric tons): 254.8

Cangyuan Washan Airport
- Simplified Chinese: 沧源佤山机场
- Traditional Chinese: 滄源佤山機場
Transcriptions
Standard Mandarin
- Hanyu Pinyin: Cāngyuán Wǎshān Jīchǎng

Cangyuan Washan Airport (IATA: CWJ, ICAO: ZPCW) is an airport serving Cangyuan Va Autonomous County in Lincang, Yunnan province, southwest China. The airport is located in Nuoliang Township and opened in December 2016.

== History ==
Construction of the airport began on 20 December 2013, with an estimated total investment of 1.589 billion yuan. Cangyuan Washan Airport opened on 8 December 2016 with the arrival of a Lucky Air flight from Kunming, the capital of the province. The airport supports tourism in the county; it is closer than Lincang Airport, originally the only airport in Lincang, to Wengding Wa village, a popular tourist attraction.

== Facilities ==
The airport has one runway that measures 2,600 by 45 metres (8,530 ft × 148 ft). It can handle 270,000 passengers and 1,080 tonnes (1,190 short tons) of cargo per year.

== Airlines and destinations ==
Airlines	Destinations
China Eastern Airlines	Kunming, Shanghai–Hongqiao

== See also ==
- List of airports in China
- List of the busiest airports in China
