= Xiaowandong railway station =

Railway station in Xiaowandong, China

Xiaowandong 小湾东

General information
- Location: Xiaowandong Town, Nanjian Yi Autonomous County, Dali Bai Autonomous Prefecture, Yunnan; China
- Coordinates: 24.7140021°N 100.1440483°E
- Line: Dali–Lincang railway

History
- Opened: November 6, 2021
Location
- Location within Yunnan Location within China

Xiaowandong railway station (Chinese: 小湾东站; pinyin: Xiǎowāndōng zhàn) is a railway station located in Xiaowan East Town, Nanjian Yi Autonomous County, Dali Bai Autonomous Prefecture, Yunnan. It opened on November 6, 2021.
