= Lincang Boshang Airport =

Lincang Boshang Airport 临沧博尚机场
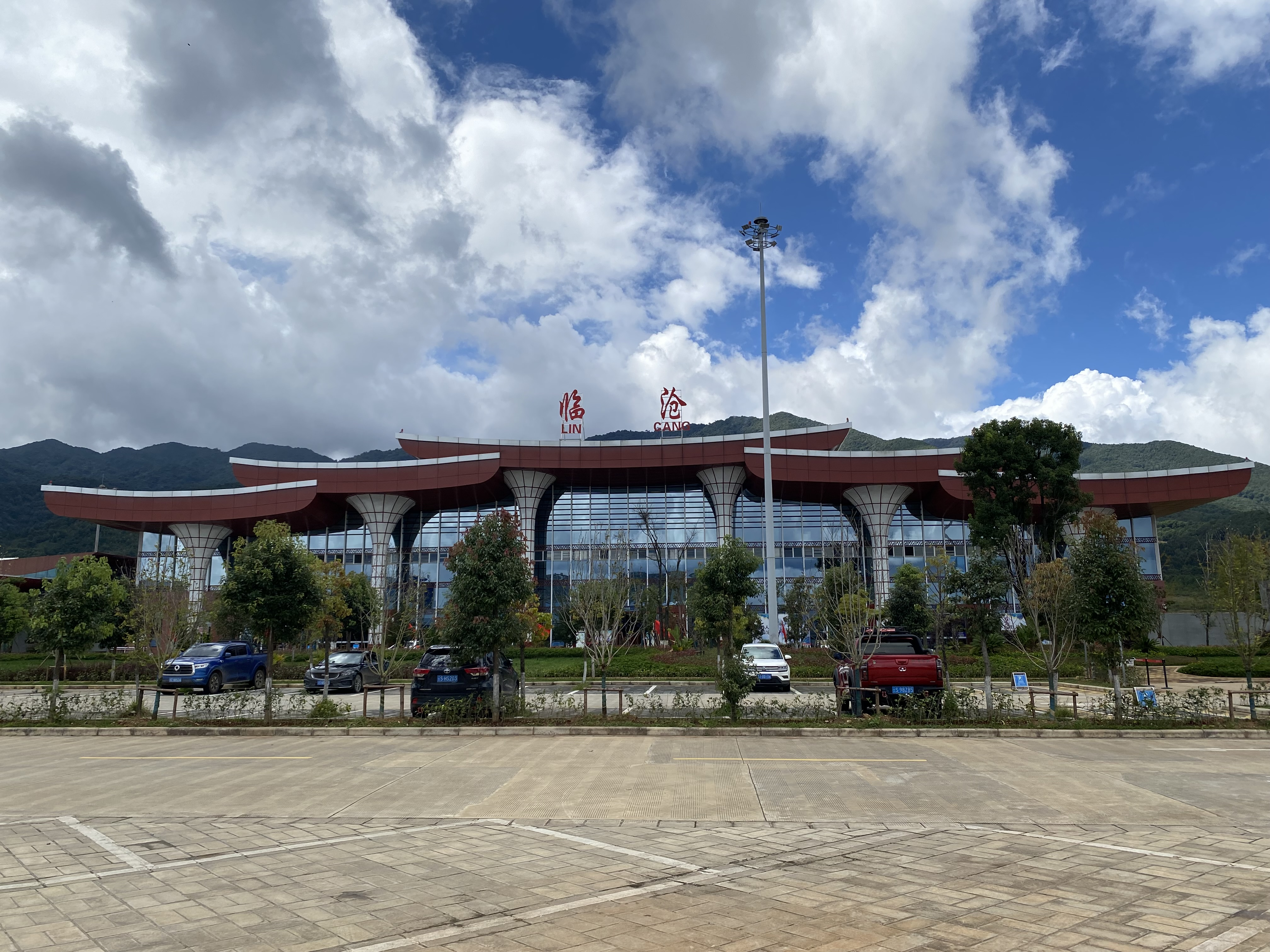
- IATA: LNJ; ICAO: ZPLC

Summary
- Airport type: Public
- Serves: Lincang
- Location: Boshang, Linxiang District, Lincang, Yunnan, China
- Opened: 25 March 2001; 25 years ago
- Elevation AMSL: 1,896 m / 6,220 ft
- Coordinates: 23°44′18″N 100°01′30″E

Map
- Location of airport in Yunnan

Runways
Direction	Length		Surface
Direction	m	ft	Surface
16/34	2,400	7,874	Concrete

Statistics (2021)
- Passengers: 296,386
- Aircraft movements: 4,086
- Cargo (metric tons): 1,208.5
- Source: CAAC

Lincang Boshang Airport
- Simplified Chinese: 临沧博尚机场
- Traditional Chinese: 臨滄博尙機場
Transcriptions
Standard Mandarin
- Hanyu Pinyin: Líncāng Bóshàng Jīchǎng

Lincang Boshang Airport (IATA: LNJ, ICAO: ZPLC) is an airport serving the city of Lincang in Yunnan province, China. The airport started operation on 25 March 2001. The airport is 22.5 km (14.0 mi) from the center of the city in the town of Boshang.

== Airlines and destinations ==
Airlines	Destinations
China Eastern Airlines	Beijing–Daxing, Chengdu–Tianfu, Kunming, Shanghai–Pudong

== See also ==
- Cangyuan Washan Airport
- List of airports in China
- List of the busiest airports in China
