= Nanjian Town =

Nanjian Town 南涧镇
- Town
- Location in Yunnan.
- Coordinates: 25°03′11″N 100°31′23″E
- Country: People's Republic of China
- Province: Yunnan
- Autonomous prefecture: Dali Bai Autonomous Prefecture
- Autonomous county: Nanjian Yi Autonomous County
- Designated (town): 1969

Area
  - Total: 362.93 km^{2} (140.13 sq mi)

Population (2020)
  - Total: 49,854
  - Density: 137.37/km^{2} (355.77/sq mi)
- Time zone: UTC+08:00 (China Standard)
- Postal code: 675799
- Area code: 0872

Nanjian (simplified Chinese: 南涧镇; traditional Chinese: 南澗鎮; pinyin: Nánjiàn Zhèn) is a town in and the county seat of Nanjian Yi Autonomous County, Yunnan, China. As of the 2020 census it had a population of 49,854 and an area of 362.93-square-kilometre (140.13 sq mi). It is the political, economic and cultural center of Nanjian Yi Autonomous County.

== Administrative division ==
As of 2018, the town is divided into one community and thirteen villages:

- South Street Community (南街社区)
- Anding (安定村)
- Xishan (西山村)
- Xiaojunzhuang (小军庄村)
- Tuanshan (团山村)
- Bao'an (保安村)
- Wazhe (瓦折村)
- Wenqi (文启村)
- Dongyong (东涌村)
- Desheng (得胜村)
- Yaiping (太平村)
- Fuxing (复兴村)
- Baiyun (白云村)
- Xinshan (新山村)

== History ==
After the founding of the Communist State in 1949, the Nanjian District (南涧分区) was set up. During the Great Leap Forward, it was renamed "Nanjian Commune" (南涧公社) in 1958. In 1969 it was upgraded to a town. In 1988 its name was changed to "Desheng Township" (得胜乡). In 2002, the Desheng Township was revoked and Nanjian became a town after reorganization.

== Geography ==
It is surrounded by Weishan Yi and Hui Autonomous County and Midu County on the north, Leqiu Township and Weishan Yi and Hui Autonomous County on the west, Midu County on the east, and Yongcui Township and Baohua Town on the south.

The highest point is Taiji Peak (太极顶), elevation 3,061 metres (10,043 ft). The lowest point is the bottom of Nanjian River (南涧河底), which, at 1,310 metres (4,300 ft) above sea level.

The town experiences a subtropical monsoon climate, with an average annual temperature of 19.1 °C (66.4 °F), total annual rainfall of 737.5-millimetre (29.04 in), a frost-free period of 305 days and annual average sunshine hours in 2443 hours.

== Economy ==
The main industries in and around the town are commerce, forestry and farming. Commercial crops include tobacco, Juglans sigillata, and vegetable.

== Demographics ==
Population census
Year	Pop.	±%
2005	45,391	—
2020	49,854	+9.8%

As of 2020, the National Bureau of Statistics of China estimates the township's population now to be 49,854.

== Transportation ==
The township is crossed by the China National Highway G214.
