= Gengma Dai and Va Autonomous County =

Gengma 耿马县 ᥛᥫᥒᥰ ᥐᥪᥒ ᥛᥣᥳ gaeng mīex sin
- Autonomous county
- 耿马傣族佤族自治县; Gengma Dai and Va Autonomous County
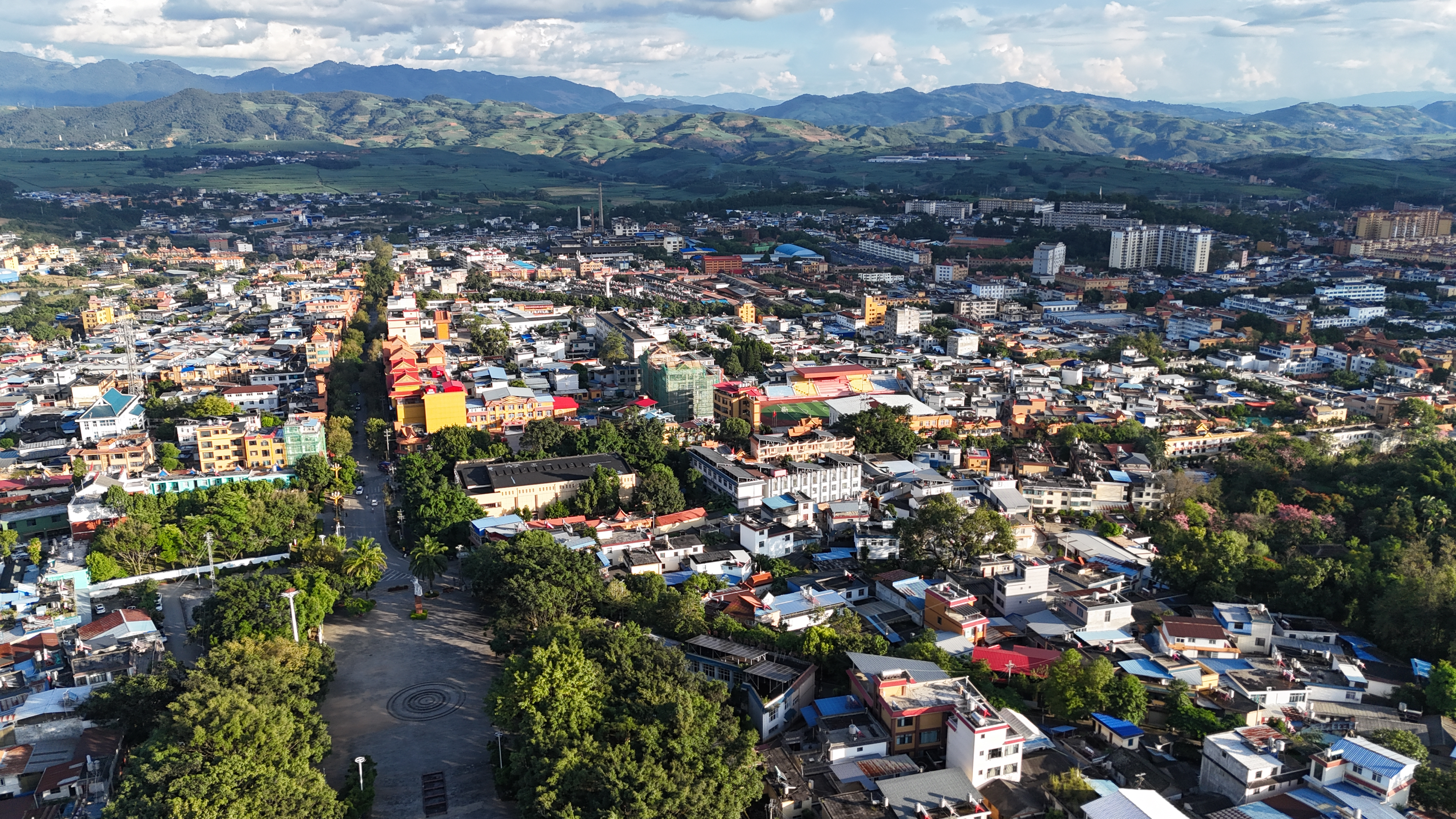
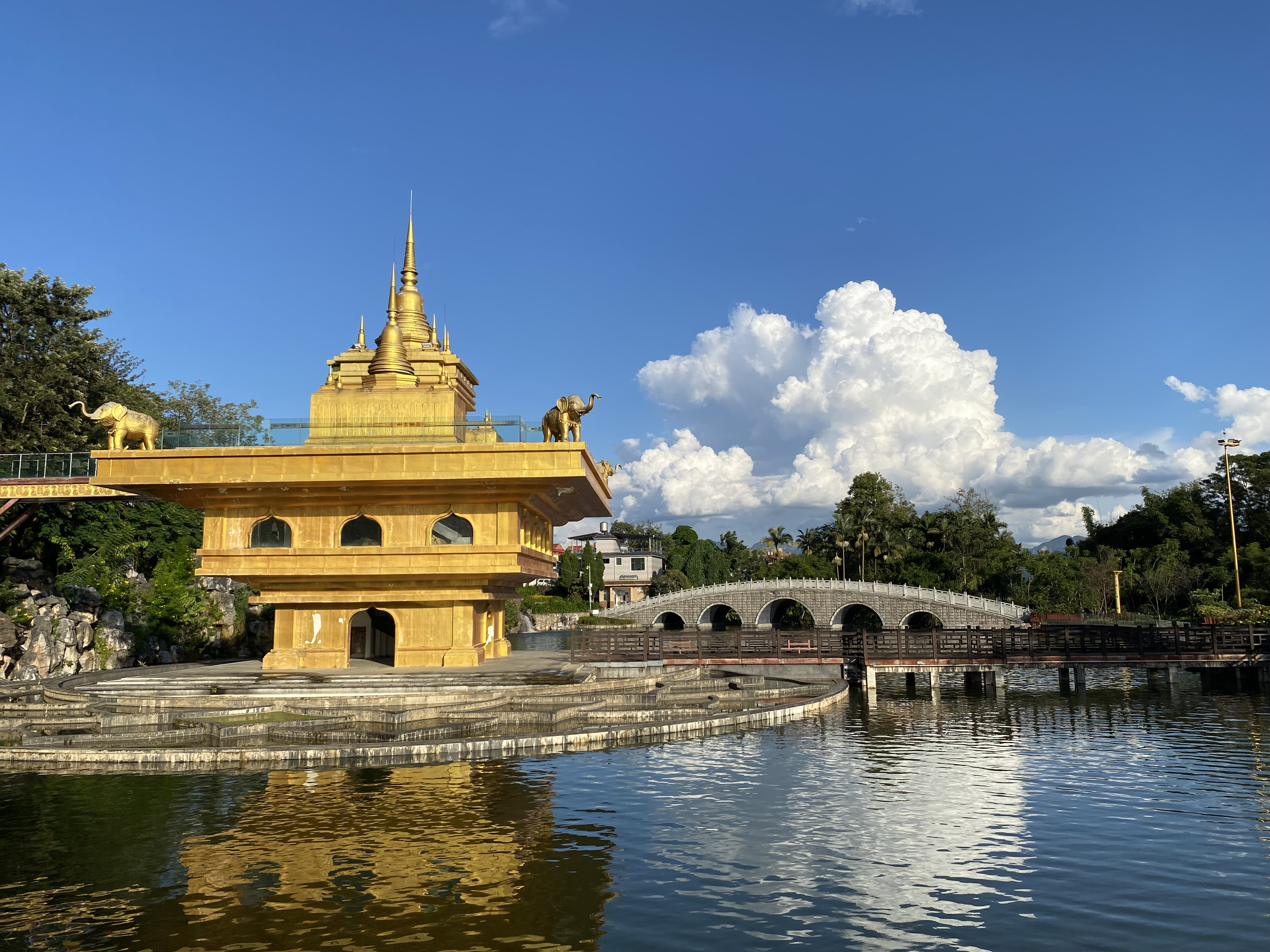
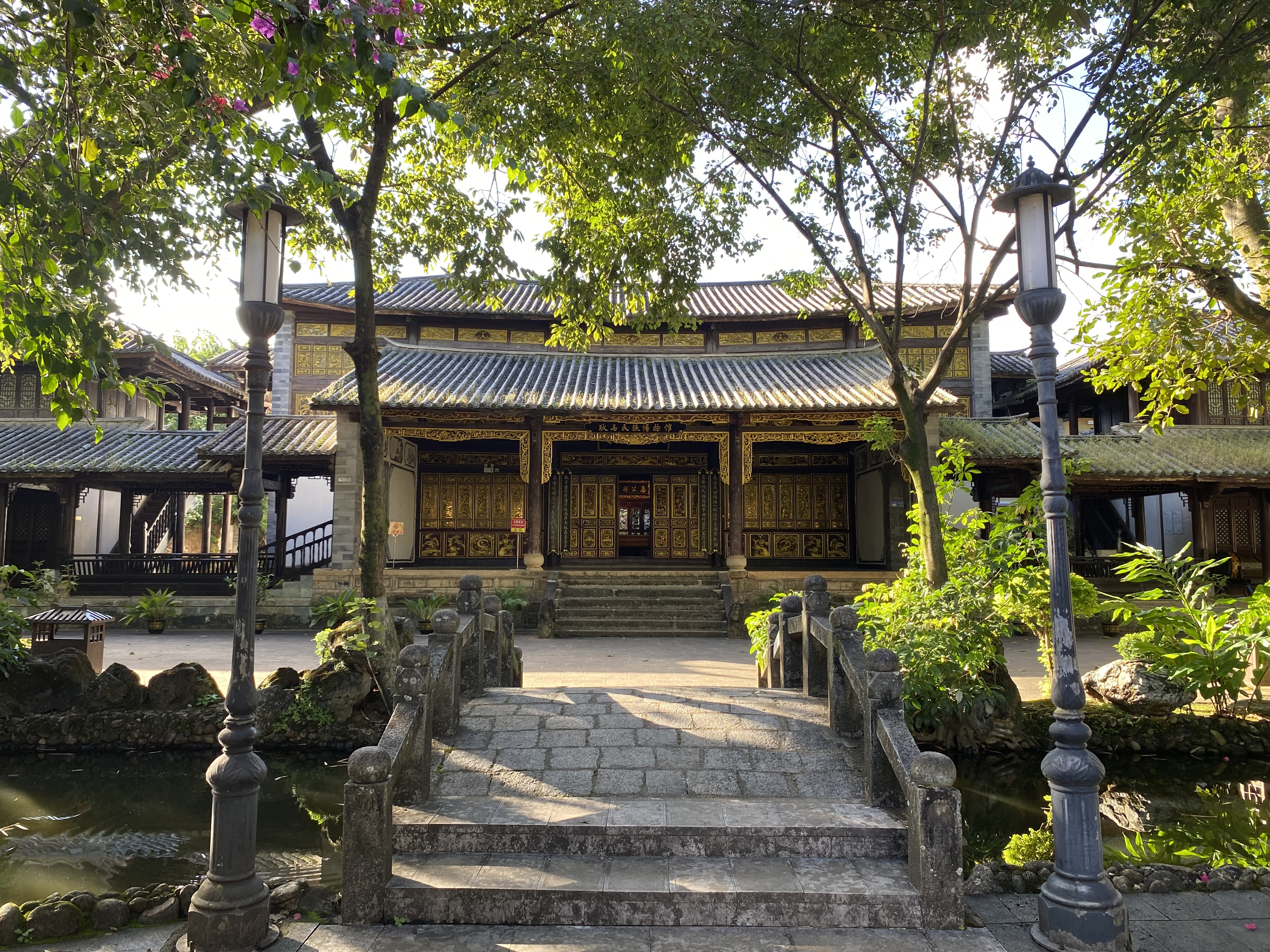
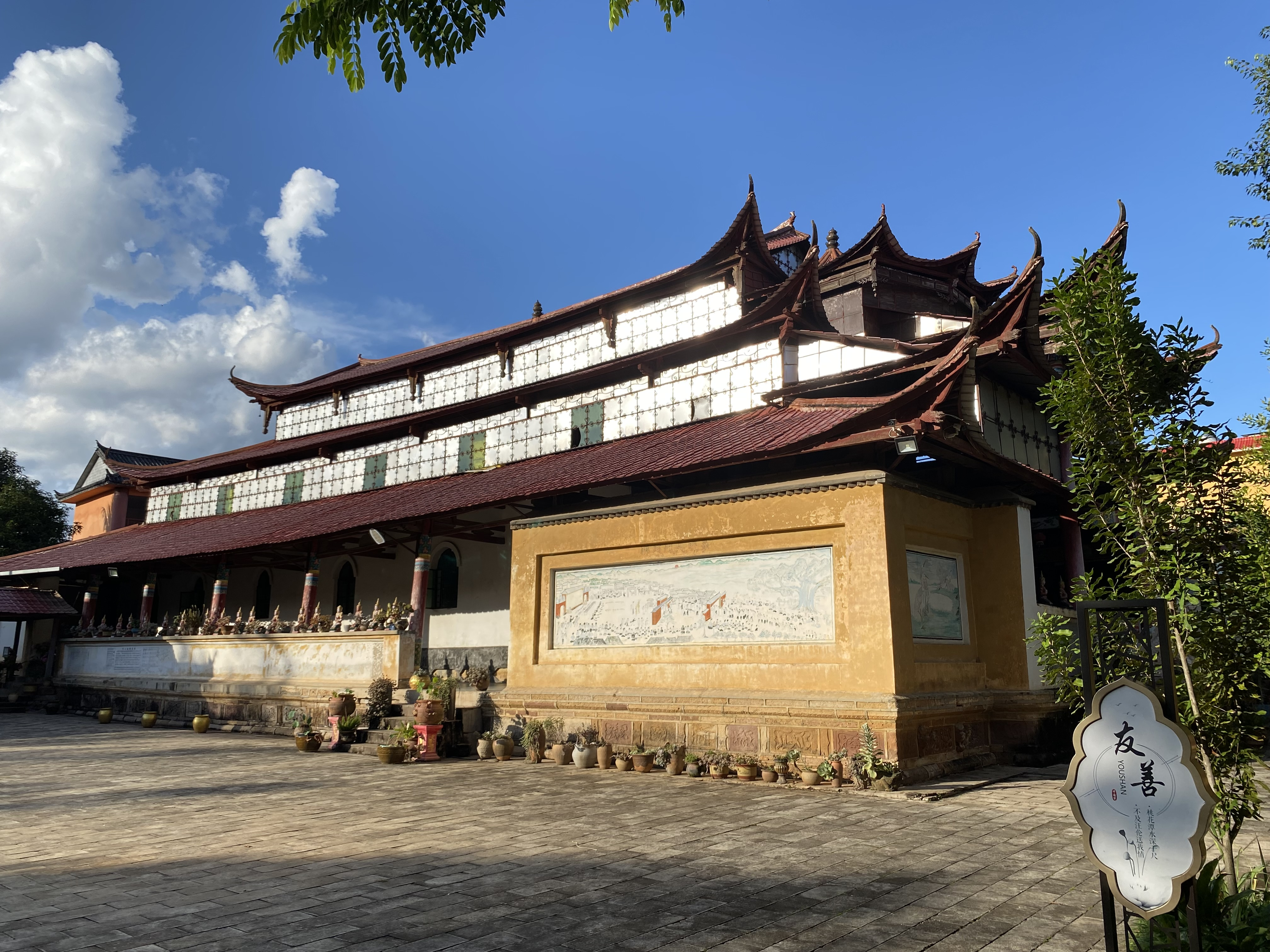
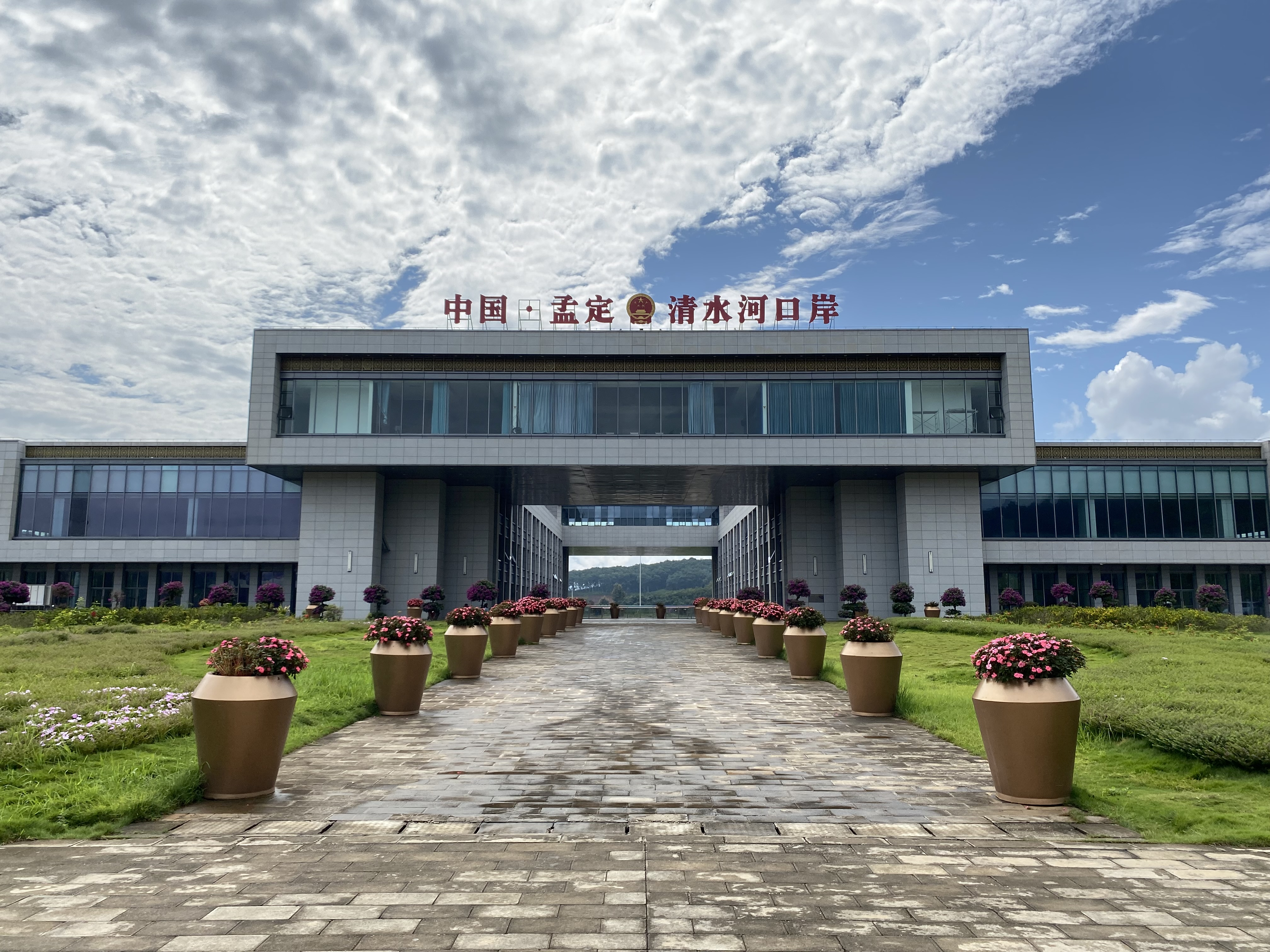
- Cityscape of county town Saṃsāra Tower at Gandong Park Gengma Tusi Chiefdom Office Gengma Central Temple Mengding Qingshuihe Border Crossing

- Location of Gengma County (red) and Lincang City (pink) within Yunnan province

- Location of the seat in Yunnan
- Coordinates: 23.538°N 99.397°E
- Country: China
- Province: Yunnan
- Prefecture-level city: Lincang
- County seat: Gengma

Area
  - Total: 3,837 km^{2} (1,481 sq mi)

Population (2020 census)
  - Total: 285,683
  - Density: 74.45/km^{2} (192.8/sq mi)
- Time zone: UTC+8 (CST)
- Postal code: 677500
- Area code: 0883
- Website: www.yngm.gov.cn

Gengma Dai and Va Autonomous County (simplified Chinese: 耿马傣族佤族自治县; traditional Chinese: 耿馬傣族佤族自治縣; pinyin: Gěngmǎ Dǎizú Wǎzú Zìzhìxiàn; Tai Nüa: ᥛᥫᥒᥰ ᥐᥪᥒ ᥛᥣᥳ; Awa: gaeng mīex) is located in Lincang City, in the west of Yunnan province, China.

== History ==
The name of the Gengma come from the Pali word "Sinthunath" meaning a place where people follow white horses. People call this city's name was named after the Ming Dynasty's Hongwu period. and was written on the front cover "History of Burma" said Kung Ma.

The main ethnic groups in the Gengma chieftains are Tai and Wa. The Tai people here moved from Mao Luang (Mong Mao) in the 14th century. They brought Mao Luang traditions with them. The original Wa people live in mountainous areas and do not have their own dialect.

In 1988, the county was affected by two strong earthquakes. It killed a total of 939 people and caused major destruction.

== Saophas ==
The origin name is Sinthunath meaning the site person find the white horse everyone called Mong Kying Keng Hkam meaning the site located of jewelry and golden.

The ethnic is Tai and Wa, Tai people emigrated from Mong Mao Long since 14 century they took the tradition and culture from Mong Mao come to here and the Wa ethnic they live on a high mountain and have there personal language.

Saophas:

1) Hkam Chuea Hpa 1397－1452
2) Hkam Kyoeng Hpa (Hkam Hso) 1452－1472 son
3) Hkam Piam Hpa (Hkam Piam) 1472－1502 son
4) Hkam Zin Hpa (Hkam Ching) 1503－1557 son
5) Hkam Phing Hpa 1557－1601 son
6) Hkam Moen Hpa 1601－1614 son
7) Hkam Ming Hpa 1614－1633 bro
8) Nang Xiao Li 1633－1659 regent, wife of Hkam Ming Hpa son
9) Hkam Mai Hpa 1659－1693 son
10) Hkam Chawng Hpa 1693－1699 son
11) Hkam Sang Hpa 1700－1732 son
12) Hkam Kai Hpa 1732－1765 son
13) Hkam Kang Hpa 1765－1771 regent, bro
14) Hkam Chai Hpa (Hkam Chuan Hpa) 1771－1803 1st son
15) Hkam Yan Chao 1803－1808 3rd son
16) Hkam Kyang Hpa 1808－1820 son
17) Hkam Htiet Hpa 1820－1825 2nd bro of Hkam Yan Chao
18) Shamawali 1825－1836 regent mother of Hkam Yan Chao
19) Hkam Earn Phai 1836－1851 nephew of Hkam Yan Chao
20) Hkam Earn Hso 1852－1858 bro
21) Hkam Long Chang 1858－1897 2nd son
22) Hkam Fu Hpa 1897－1915 son
23) Hkam Kaw Hpa 1915－1933 son
24) Hkam Chi Hpa 1933－1950 5th bro

== Administrative divisions ==
Gengma Dai and Va Autonomous County has 4 towns, 4 townships and 1 ethnic township.

4 towns

- Gengma (耿马镇)
- Mengyong (勐永镇)
- Mengsa (勐撒镇)
- Mengding (孟定镇)

4 townships

- Daxing (大兴乡)
- Sipaishan (四排山乡)
- Hepai (贺派乡)
- Mengjian (勐简乡)

1 ethnic township

- Manghong Lahu and Bulang Ethnic Township (芒洪拉祜族布朗族乡)

== Climate ==
Climate data for Gengma, elevation 1,144 m (3,753 ft), (1991–2020 normals, extremes 1981–present)
Month	Jan	Feb	Mar	Apr	May	Jun	Jul	Aug	Sep	Oct	Nov	Dec	Year
Record high °C (°F)	27.9 (82.2)	31.0 (87.8)	33.1 (91.6)	35.3 (95.5)	35.5 (95.9)	36.5 (97.7)	33.5 (92.3)	33.4 (92.1)	32.8 (91.0)	32.2 (90.0)	30.9 (87.6)	27.1 (80.8)	36.5 (97.7)
Mean daily maximum °C (°F)	22.7 (72.9)	24.9 (76.8)	28.0 (82.4)	29.7 (85.5)	29.8 (85.6)	29.0 (84.2)	28.2 (82.8)	29.0 (84.2)	28.9 (84.0)	27.2 (81.0)	25.0 (77.0)	22.6 (72.7)	27.1 (80.8)
Daily mean °C (°F)	12.8 (55.0)	15.4 (59.7)	19.1 (66.4)	21.7 (71.1)	23.3 (73.9)	24.0 (75.2)	23.5 (74.3)	23.6 (74.5)	22.9 (73.2)	20.7 (69.3)	16.6 (61.9)	13.2 (55.8)	19.7 (67.5)
Mean daily minimum °C (°F)	5.8 (42.4)	7.9 (46.2)	11.7 (53.1)	15.3 (59.5)	18.6 (65.5)	20.7 (69.3)	20.9 (69.6)	20.6 (69.1)	19.4 (66.9)	16.8 (62.2)	11.3 (52.3)	7.1 (44.8)	14.7 (58.4)
Record low °C (°F)	−1.6 (29.1)	0.7 (33.3)	1.7 (35.1)	8.6 (47.5)	11.5 (52.7)	15.4 (59.7)	15.6 (60.1)	16.1 (61.0)	12.4 (54.3)	7.2 (45.0)	3.0 (37.4)	−2.0 (28.4)	−2.0 (28.4)
Average precipitation mm (inches)	25.3 (1.00)	14.5 (0.57)	20.8 (0.82)	58.4 (2.30)	132.9 (5.23)	180.5 (7.11)	277.9 (10.94)	220.8 (8.69)	158.8 (6.25)	127.1 (5.00)	48.6 (1.91)	14.5 (0.57)	1,280.1 (50.39)
Average precipitation days (≥ 0.1 mm)	3.3	3.2	5.2	11.1	16.4	23.2	26.2	22.7	17.9	15.1	6.2	3.6	154.1
Average relative humidity (%)	72	63	56	59	68	79	84	83	81	81	78	77	73
Mean monthly sunshine hours	222.9	222.3	234.1	225.4	209.6	146.1	115.3	142.5	160.7	169.3	194.2	207.7	2,250.1
Percentage possible sunshine	66	69	63	59	51	36	28	36	44	48	59	63	52
Source: China Meteorological Administrationall-time November high

== Ethnic groups ==
There are 1,004 Jingpo people located in the following five villages of Gengma County.

- New Jingpo hamlet 景颇新寨, Mangkang Village 芒抗村, Hepai Township 贺派乡
- Nalong 那拢组, Nongba Village 弄巴村, Gengma Town 耿马镇
- Hewen 贺稳组, Jingxin Village 景信村, Mengding Town 孟定镇
- Hebianzhai 河边寨, Qiushan Village 邱山村, Mengding Town 孟定镇
- Caobazhai 草坝寨, Mang'ai Village 芒艾村, Mengding Town 孟定镇
