= Lincang =

Lincang 临沧市
- Prefecture-level city
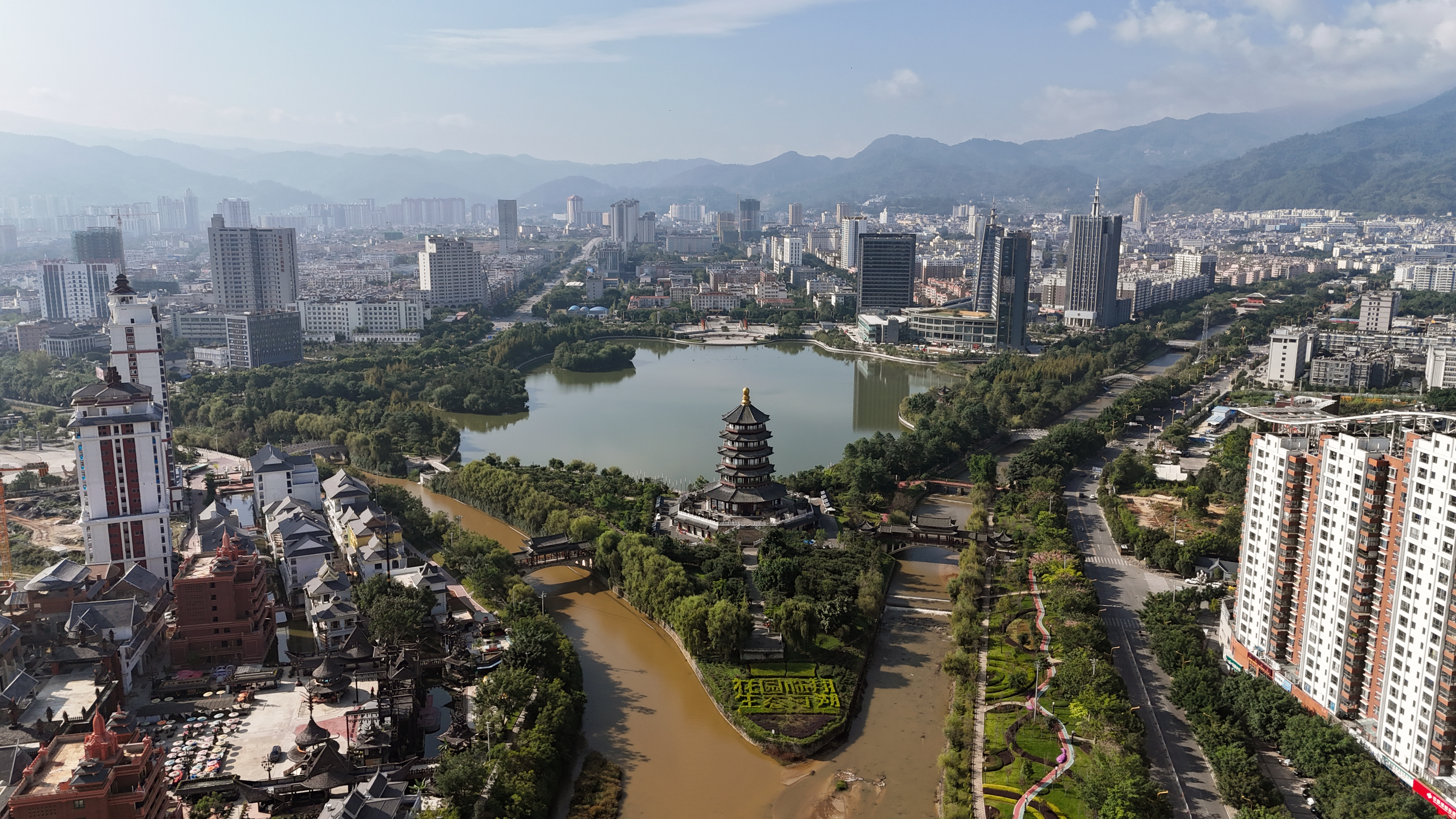
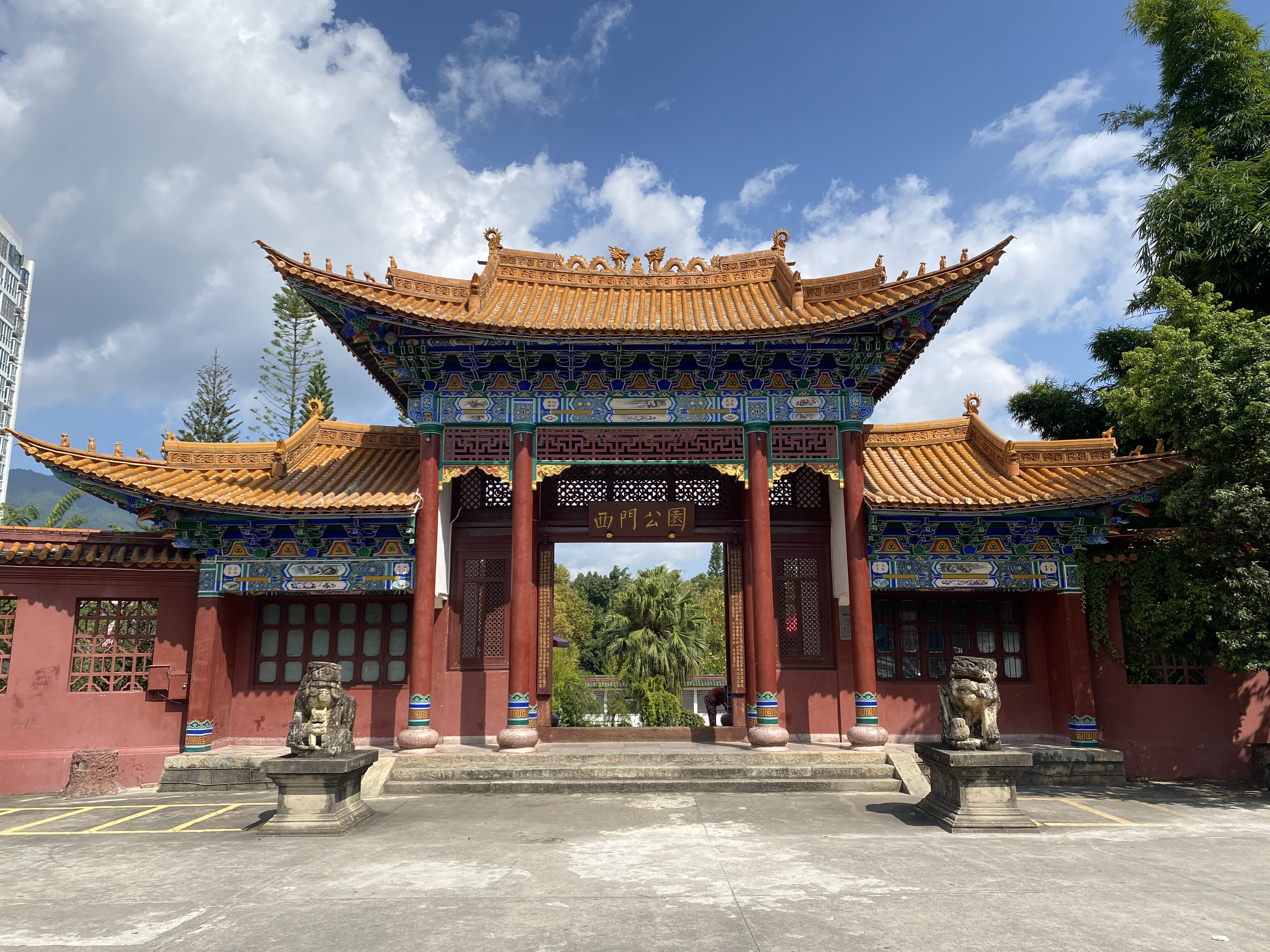
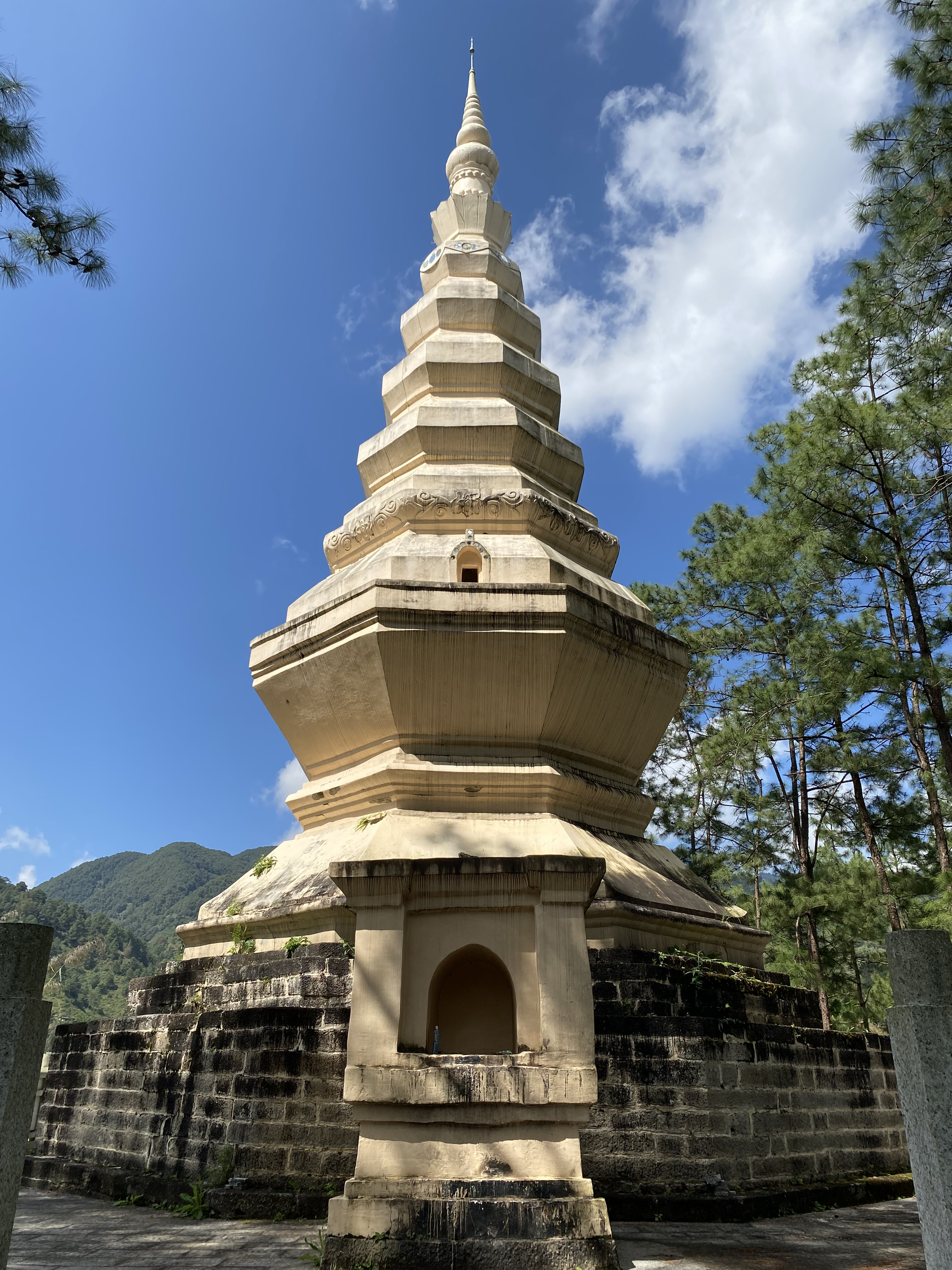
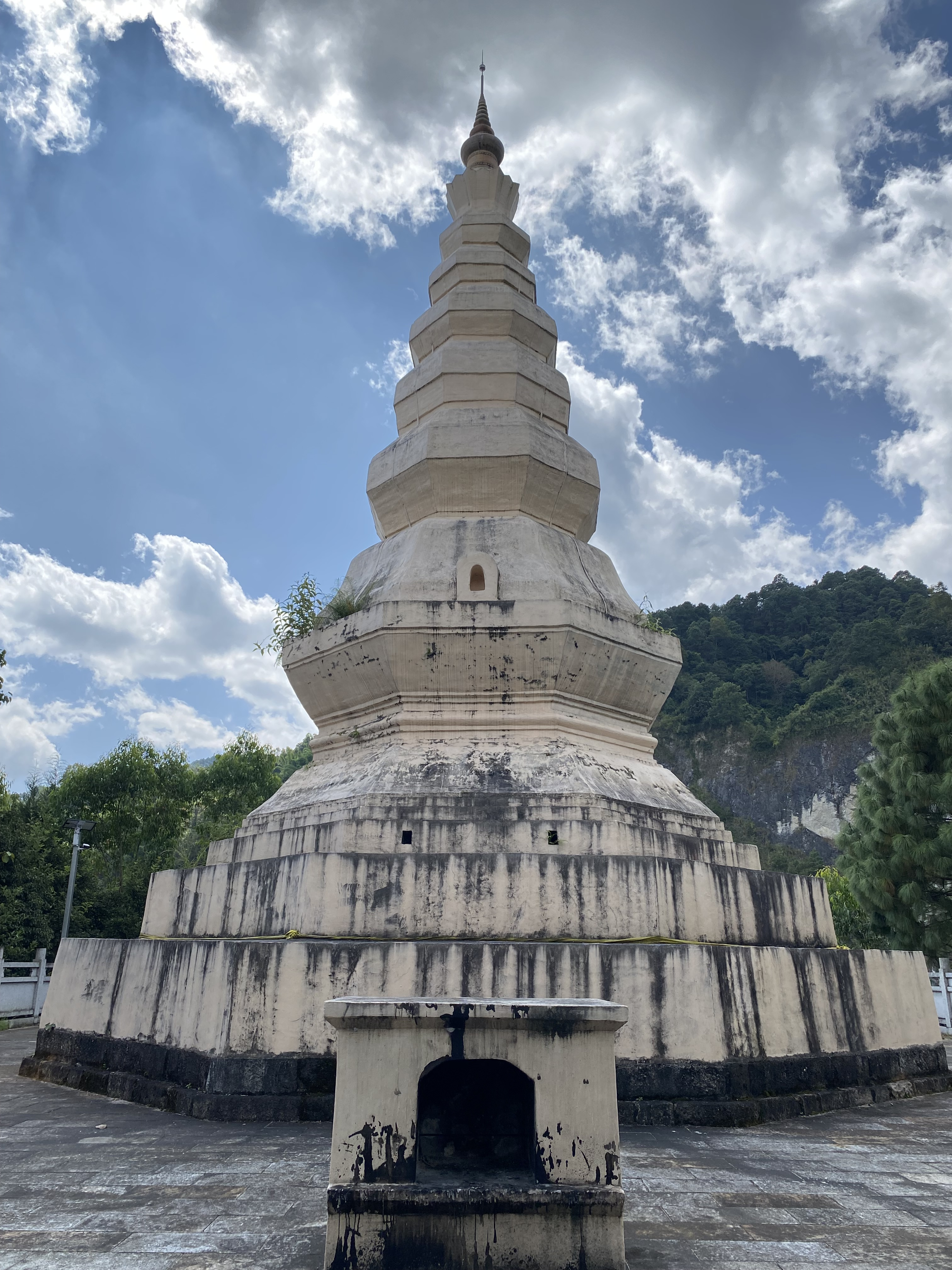
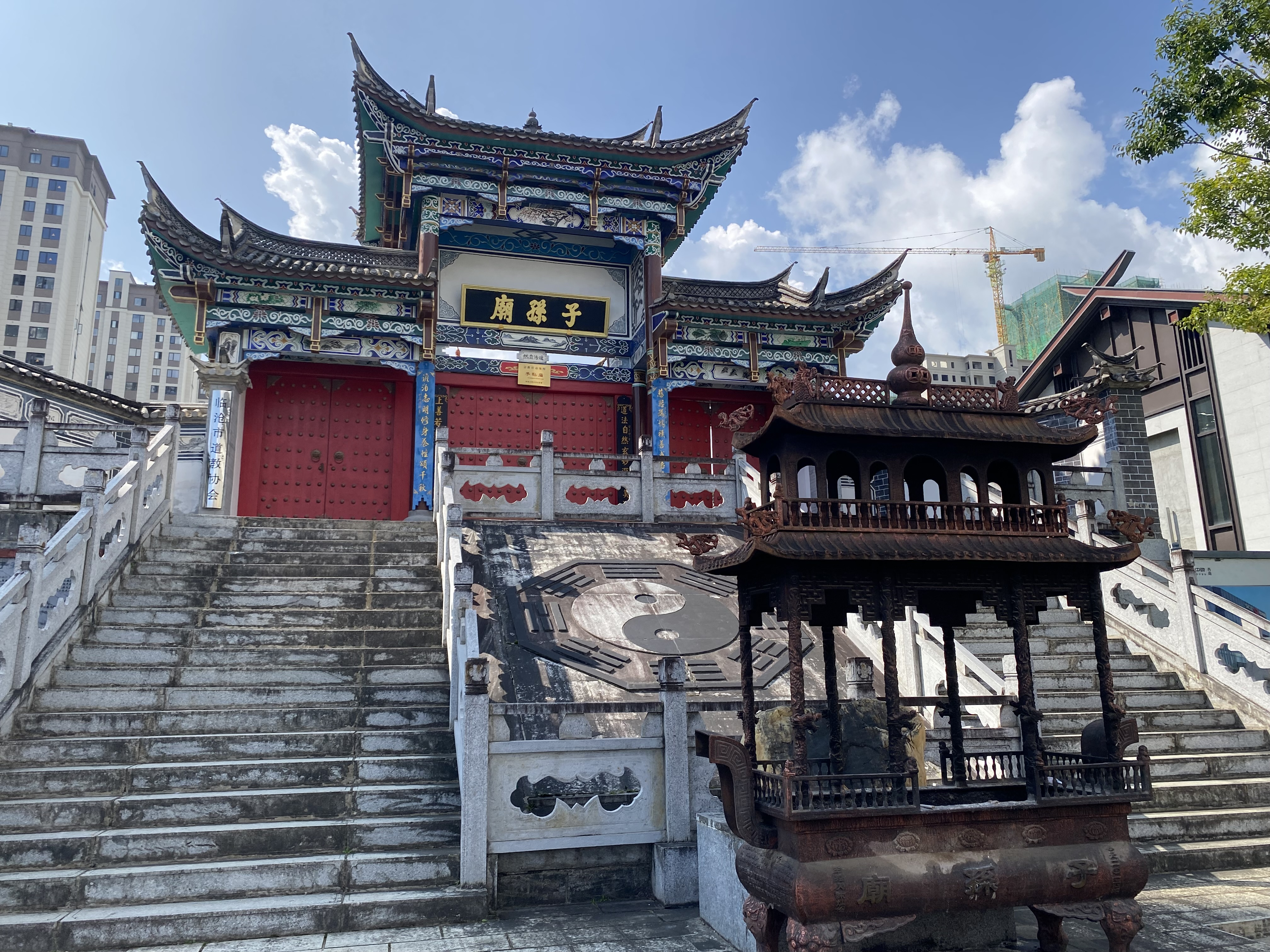
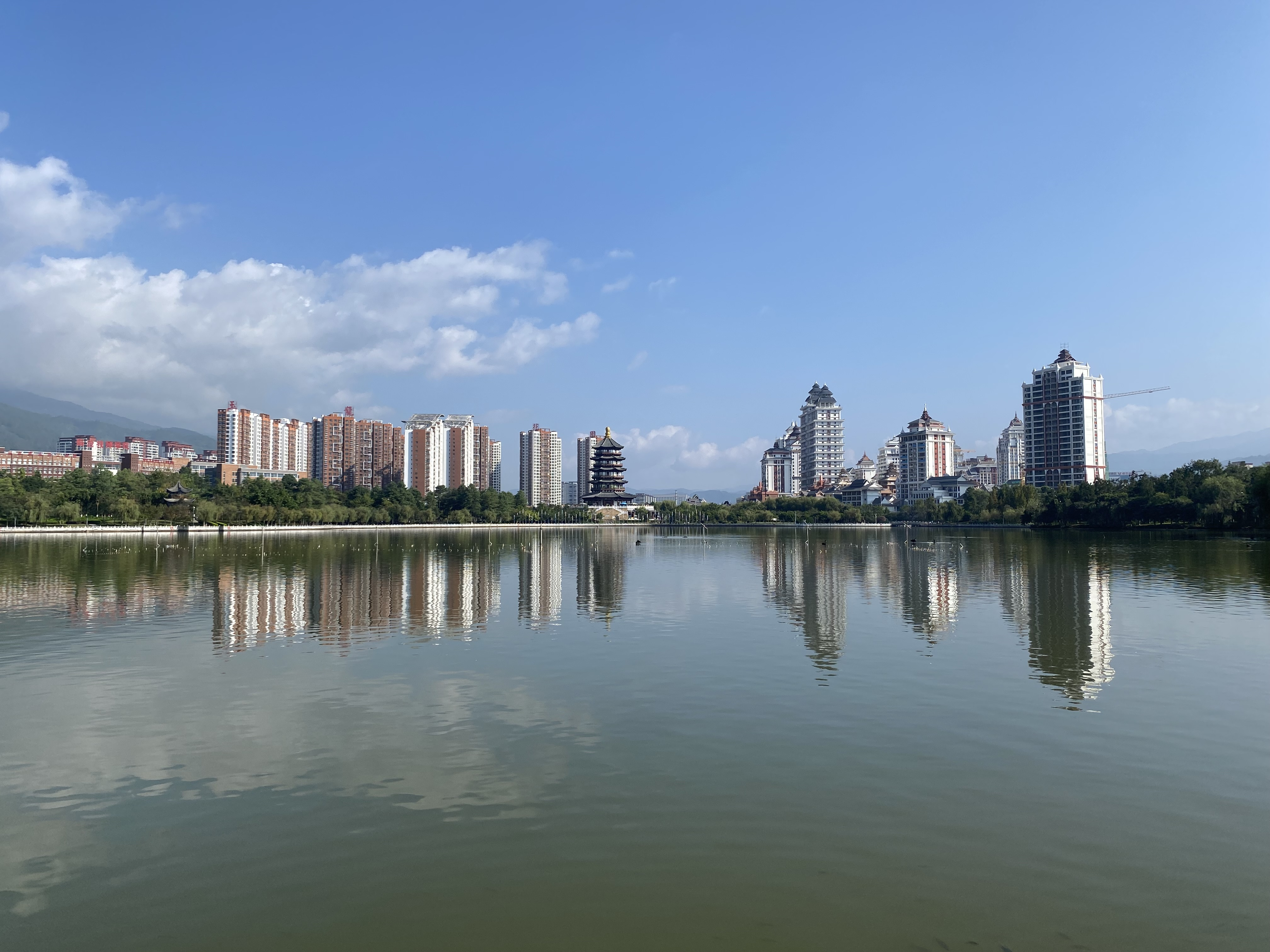
- Downtown skyline West City Gate Park Mengwang Stupa Northwest Stupa Zhangga Zisun Temple Yulong Lake

- Location of Lincang City jurisdiction in Yunnan

- Location in China
- Coordinates (Lincang municipal government): 23°53′02″N 100°05′20″E
- Country: People's Republic of China
- Province: Yunnan
- Admin HQ: Linxiang

Area
  - Total: 23,620.72 km^{2} (9,120.01 sq mi)
- Elevation: 1,517 m (4,977 ft)

Population (2020)
  - Total: 2,257,991
  - Density: 95.59366/km^{2} (247.5864/sq mi)

GDP
  - Total: CN¥ 100 billion US$ 14.8 billion
  - Per capita: CN¥ 44,723; US$ 6,596
- Time zone: UTC+8 (China Standard)
- Postal code: 677XXX
- Area code: 0883
- ISO 3166 code: CN-YN-09
- Licence plate prefixes: 云S
- Website: www.lincang.gov.cn

Lincang (simplified Chinese: 临沧; traditional Chinese: 臨滄; pinyin: Líncāng) is a prefecture-level city located in the southwest of Yunnan province, People's Republic of China.

== History ==
Lincang was previously called Baihuai during the Shang dynasty.

On December 26, 2003, the state council approved the cancellation of Lincang District and set up prefecture-level Lincang city.

== Geography and climate ==
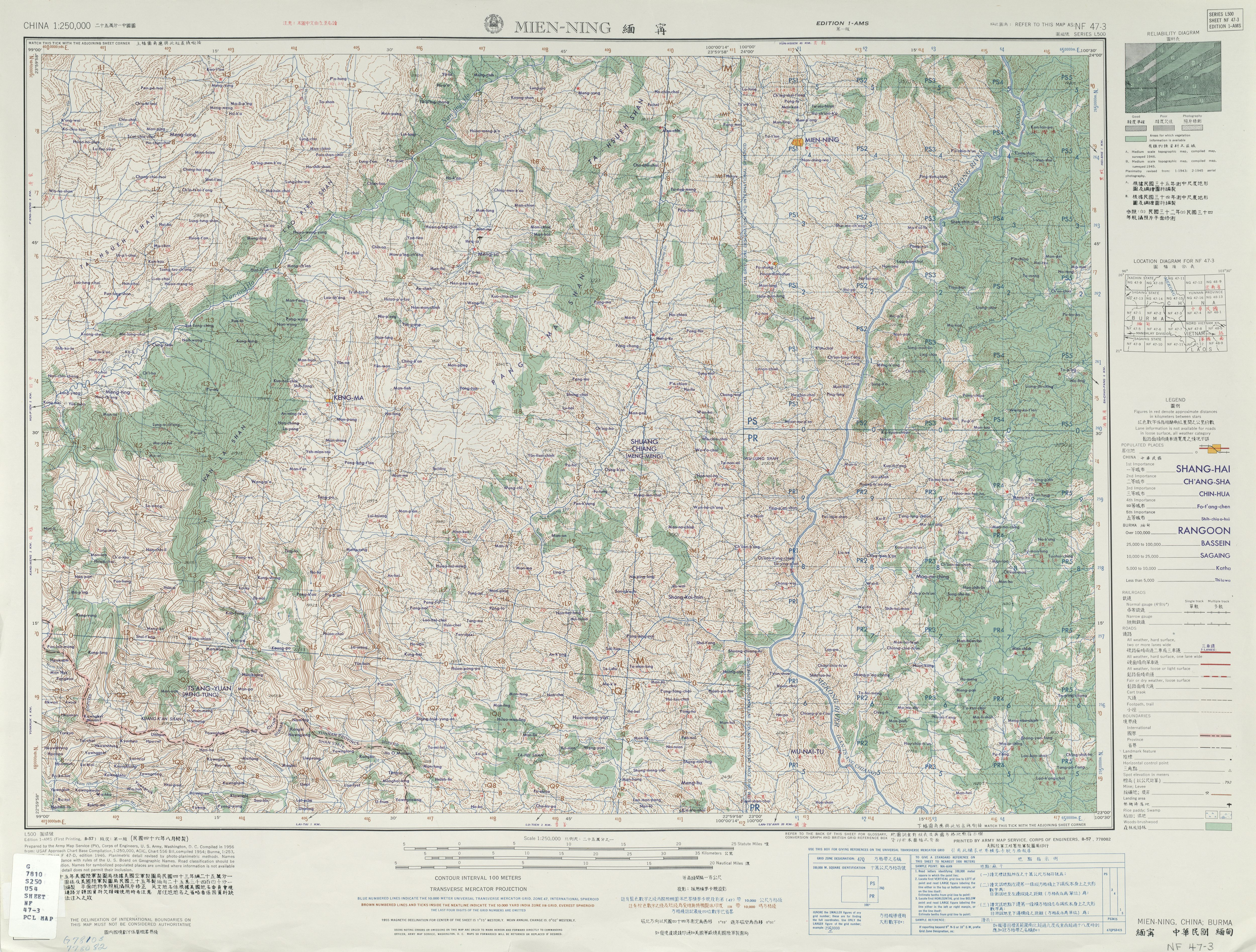
Lincang (labelled as MIEN-NING 緬甯) (1956)

Lincang covers latitude 23° 05′－25° 02′ N and longitude 98° 40′－100° 33′ E, thus straddling the Tropic of Cancer in the southern part of its administrative area, or prefecture. It is situated on the middle to lower reaches of the Mekong, known as the Lancang in China, and the Salween, or the Nu. Bordering prefectures are Pu'er to the southeast, and Baoshan and Dali to the northwest. It also borders Burma's Shan State. Elevations within the prefecture range from 450 to 3,504 metres (1,476 to 11,496 ft).

Located at an altitude of above 1,450 m (4,760 ft) and within 30 arc minutes to the north of the Tropic of Cancer, Lincang has a mild subtropical highland climate (Köppen Cwb), bordering on a humid subtropical climate (Köppen Cwa), with muddled distinction between the seasons and daytime temperatures remaining warm year-round. Highs peak in May before the core of the rainy season and reach a minimum in December; however, the warmest and coolest months are June and January respectively. June through September accounts for nearly 70% of the annual rainfall of 1,126 mm (44.3 in) and during this time, some rainfall occurs on most days, pushing relative humidity above 80% and there is a marked reduction in sunshine. With monthly percent possible sunshine ranging from 24% in July to 75% in January, the city receives 2,227 hours of bright sunshine annually.

Climate data for Lincang, elevation 1,502 m (4,928 ft), (1991–2020 normals, extremes 1953–present)
| Month | Jan | Feb | Mar | Apr | May | Jun | Jul | Aug | Sep | Oct | Nov | Dec | Year |
|---|---|---|---|---|---|---|---|---|---|---|---|---|---|
| Record high °C (°F) | 26.0 (78.8) | 28.6 (83.5) | 30.5 (86.9) | 32.9 (91.2) | 34.9 (94.8) | 34.4 (93.9) | 32.7 (90.9) | 32.6 (90.7) | 30.9 (87.6) | 30.1 (86.2) | 27.6 (81.7) | 25.8 (78.4) | 34.9 (94.8) |
| Mean daily maximum °C (°F) | 20.6 (69.1) | 22.6 (72.7) | 25.4 (77.7) | 27.2 (81.0) | 27.4 (81.3) | 27.0 (80.6) | 26.3 (79.3) | 26.9 (80.4) | 26.3 (79.3) | 24.7 (76.5) | 22.6 (72.7) | 20.4 (68.7) | 24.8 (76.6) |
| Daily mean °C (°F) | 11.8 (53.2) | 14.1 (57.4) | 17.2 (63.0) | 19.6 (67.3) | 21.2 (70.2) | 22.2 (72.0) | 21.9 (71.4) | 21.9 (71.4) | 21.0 (69.8) | 18.9 (66.0) | 15.1 (59.2) | 12.1 (53.8) | 18.1 (64.6) |
| Mean daily minimum °C (°F) | 5.5 (41.9) | 7.4 (45.3) | 10.6 (51.1) | 13.4 (56.1) | 16.5 (61.7) | 19.1 (66.4) | 19.4 (66.9) | 19.0 (66.2) | 17.9 (64.2) | 15.3 (59.5) | 10.3 (50.5) | 6.6 (43.9) | 13.4 (56.1) |
| Record low °C (°F) | −3.8 (25.2) | −0.7 (30.7) | 0.9 (33.6) | 4.7 (40.5) | 10.1 (50.2) | 12.4 (54.3) | 14.6 (58.3) | 13.1 (55.6) | 10.6 (51.1) | 6.7 (44.1) | 1.8 (35.2) | −1.0 (30.2) | −3.8 (25.2) |
| Average precipitation mm (inches) | 22.4 (0.88) | 14.3 (0.56) | 20.5 (0.81) | 42.6 (1.68) | 100.9 (3.97) | 155.7 (6.13) | 255.6 (10.06) | 215.1 (8.47) | 141.7 (5.58) | 108.2 (4.26) | 37.3 (1.47) | 11.4 (0.45) | 1,125.7 (44.32) |
| Average precipitation days (≥ 0.1 mm) | 3.4 | 3.7 | 5.3 | 9.5 | 15.9 | 21.7 | 25.9 | 23.2 | 19.2 | 15.0 | 6.0 | 3.6 | 152.4 |
| Average relative humidity (%) | 63 | 56 | 52 | 57 | 67 | 78 | 82 | 81 | 79 | 78 | 73 | 70 | 70 |
| Mean monthly sunshine hours | 250.5 | 233.2 | 241.7 | 223.3 | 189.6 | 126.3 | 100.5 | 132.0 | 132.7 | 155.4 | 209.6 | 232.3 | 2,227.1 |
| Percentage possible sunshine | 75 | 72 | 65 | 58 | 46 | 31 | 24 | 33 | 36 | 44 | 64 | 70 | 52 |
Source 1: China Meteorological Administration extremes
Source 2: Weather China

== Subdivisions ==
Map
| Name | Hanzi | Hanyu Pinyin | Population (2010) | Area (km^{2}) | Density (/km^{2}) |
|---|---|---|---|---|---|
| Linxiang District | 临翔区 | Línxiáng Qū | 323,708 | 2,652 | 122 |
| Fengqing County | 凤庆县 | Fèngqìng Xiàn | 458,330 | 3,451 | 133 |
| Yun County | 云县 | Yún Xiàn | 449,460 | 3,760 | 120 |
| Yongde County | 永德县 | Yǒngdé Xiàn | 369,702 | 3,296 | 112 |
| Zhenkang County | 镇康县 | Zhènkāng Xiàn | 176,356 | 2,642 | 67 |
| Shuangjiang Lahu, Va, Blang and Dai Autonomous County | 双江拉祜族佤族布朗族傣族自治县 | Shuāngjiāng Lāhùzú Wǎzú Bùlǎngzú Dǎizú Zìzhìxiàn | 176,549 | 2,292 | 77 |
| Gengma Dai and Va Autonomous County | 耿马傣族佤族自治县 | Gěngmǎ Dǎizú Wǎzú Zìzhìxiàn | 296,302 | 3,837 | 77 |
| Cangyuan Va Autonomous County | 沧源佤族自治县 | Cāngyuán Wǎzú Zìzhìxiàn | 179,098 | 2,539 | 71 |

== Demography ==
Among the resident population, the Han population is 1394881, accounting for 61.78% of the total population; the ethnic minorities population is 863,110, accounting for 38.22% of the total population.

Ethnic Composition of Lincang City
| | National name | Han | Yi | Wa | Dai | Lahu | Bulang | Bai | Hui | Lisu | Miao | Others | Total |
|---|---|---|---|---|---|---|---|---|---|---|---|---|---|
| 2010 | Population | 1523662 | 355768 | 235165 | 114312 | 85818 | 40434 | 30904 | 10081 | 9237 | 8856 | 15260 | 2429505 |
| 2010 | Proportion of total population (%) | 62.72 | 14.64 | 9.68 | 4.71 | 3.53 | 1.66 | 1.27 | 0.41 | 0.38 | 0.36 | 0.63 | 100% |
| 2010 | Proportion of minority population (%) | --- | 39.28 | 25.96 | 12.62 | 9.47 | 4.46 | 3.41 | 1.11 | 1.02 | 0.98 | 1.68 | --- |
| 2020 | Population | 1394881 | 339356 | 214453 | 112082 | 82771 | 37509 | 29359 | 9996 | 9645 | 9350 | 18515 | 2257991 |
| 2020 | Proportion of total population (%) | 61.78% | 15.03% | 9.5% | 4.96% | 3.67% | 1.66% | 1.3% | 0.44% | 0.43% | 0.41% | 0.82% | 100% |
| 2020 | Proportion of minority population (%) | --- | 39.32% | 24.85% | 12.99% | 9.59% | 4.35% | 3.4% | 1.16% | 1.12% | 1.08% | 2.15% | --- |

== Natural resources ==
Mineral resources mined and extracted in the Lincang area include coal (including waste coal ash), germanium and uranium. Lincang is also home to the world's oldest cultivated tea tree, especially pu'er tea, some 3,200 years old, in the village of Jinxiu (锦绣), Xiaowan town, of Fengqing County.

== Transport ==
- Lincang Boshang Airport
- Cangyuan Washan Airport
- Dali–Lincang railway
