= Fengqing County =

Fengqing County 凤庆县
- County
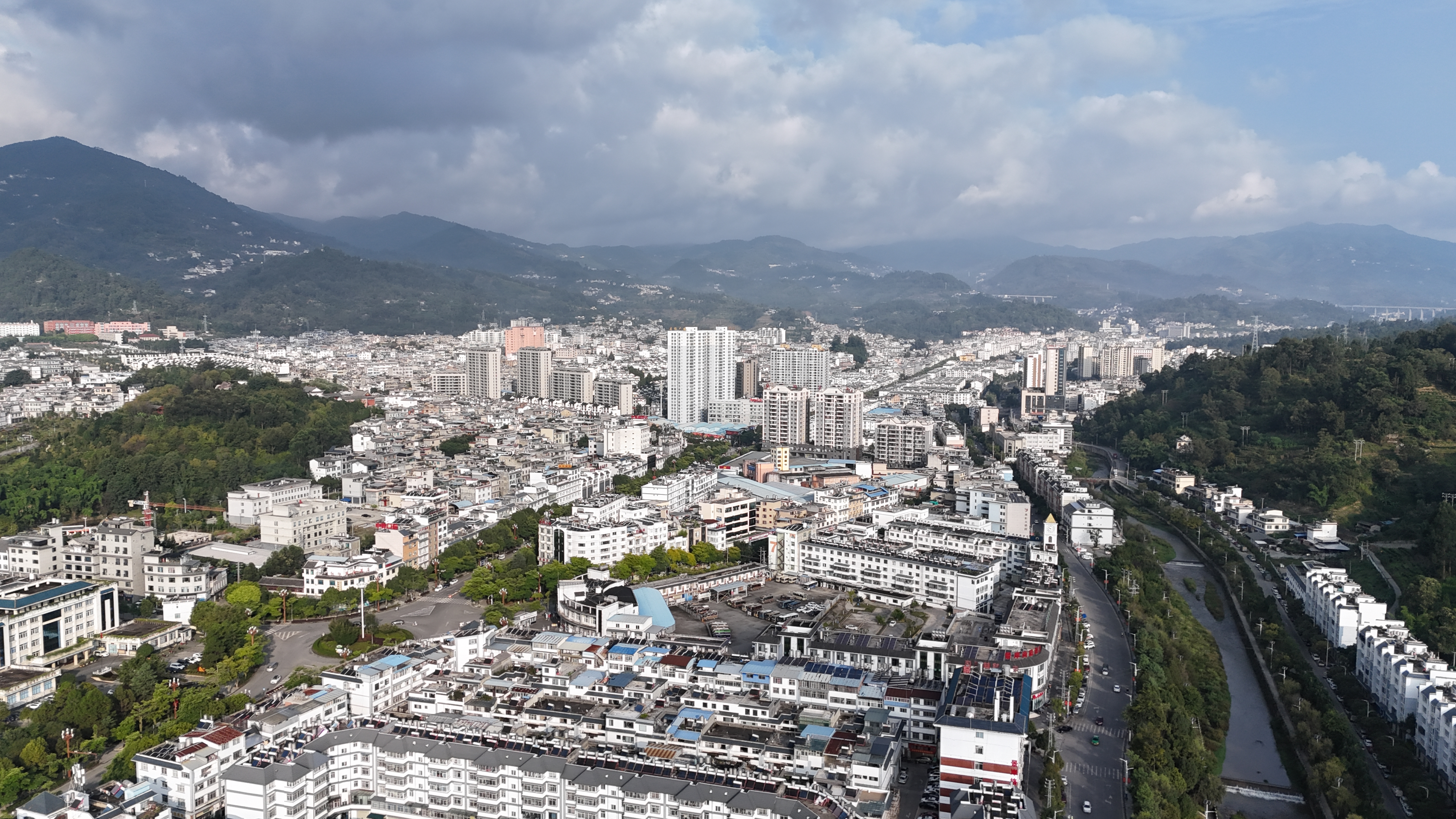
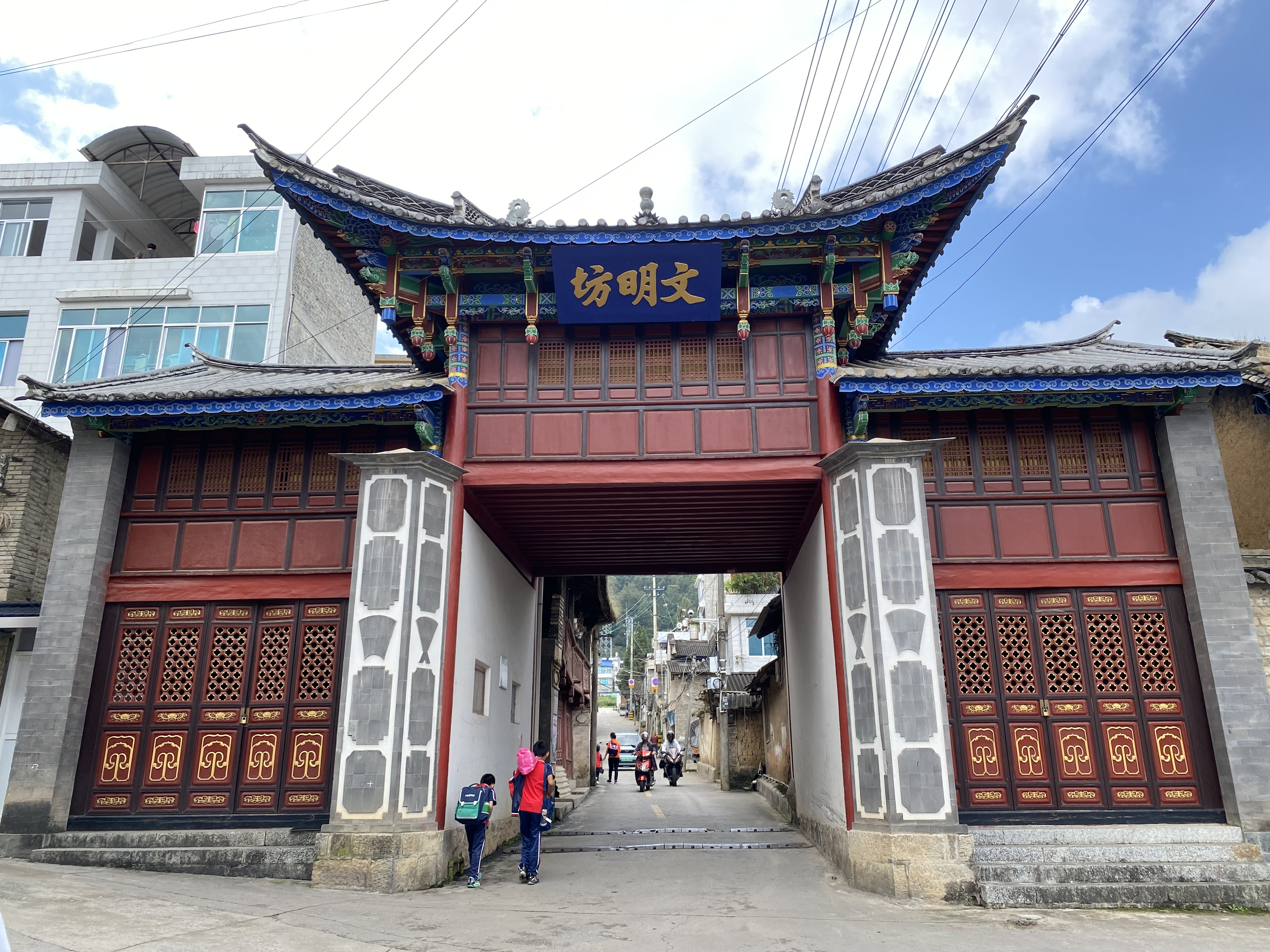
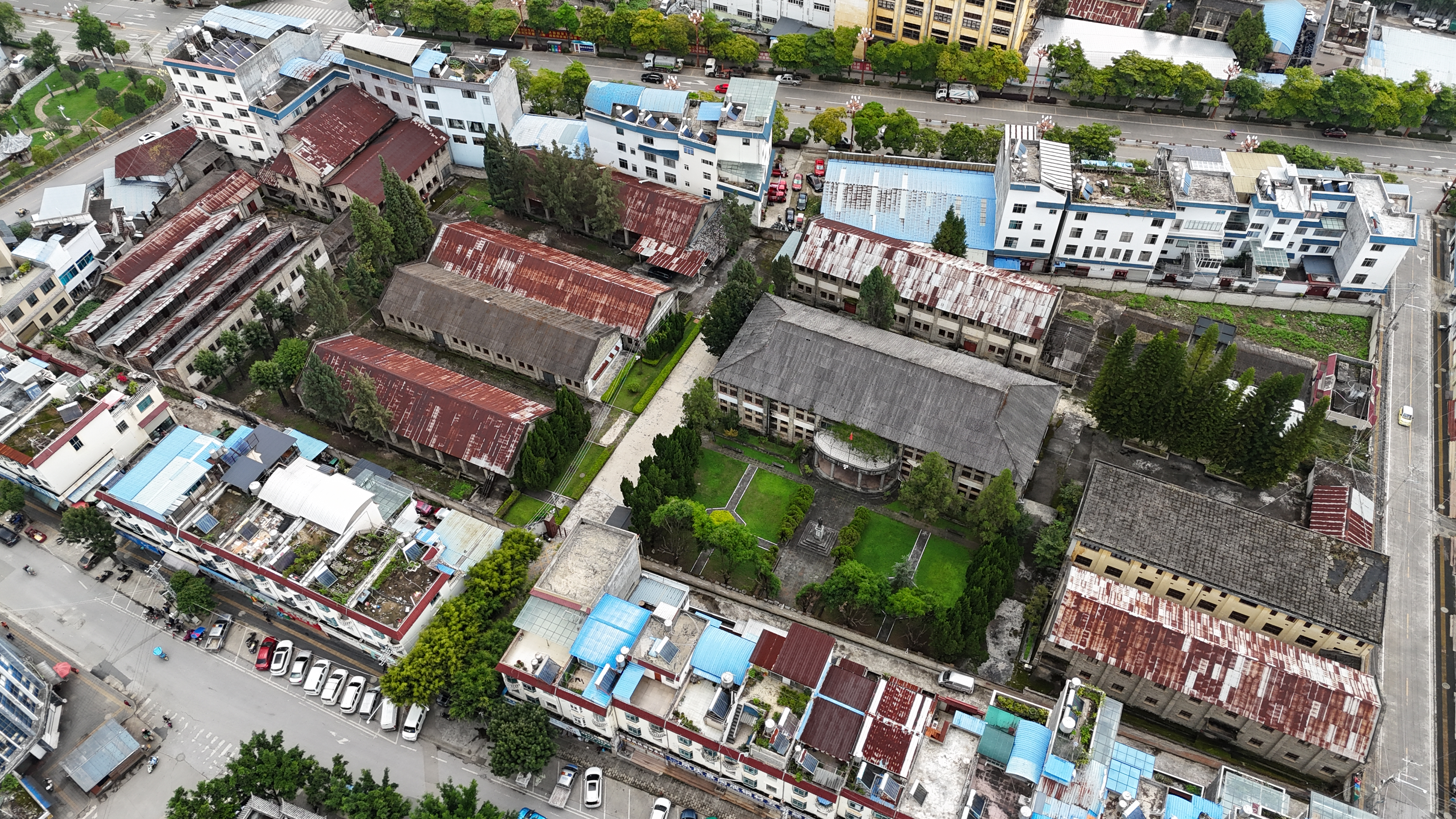
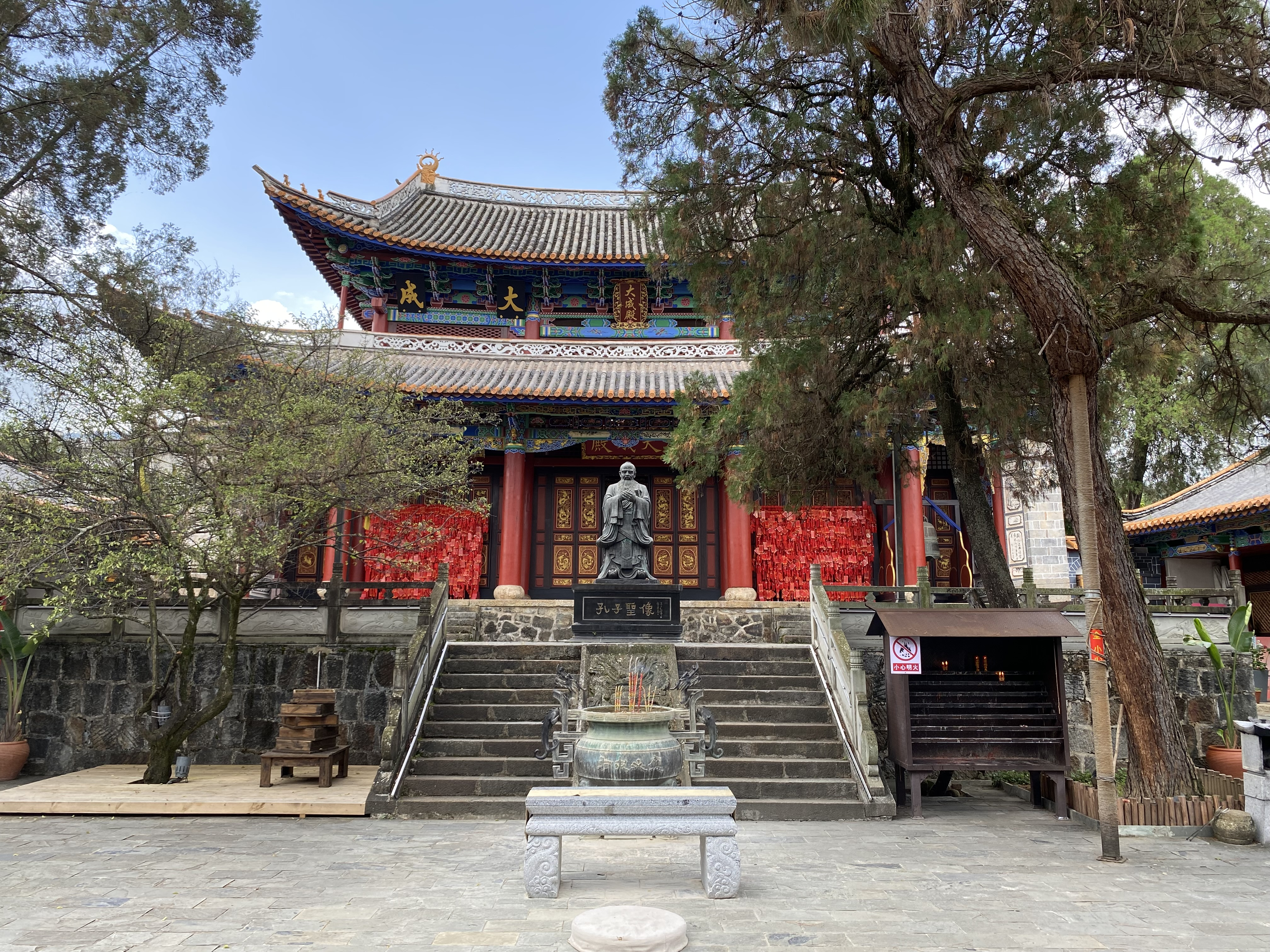
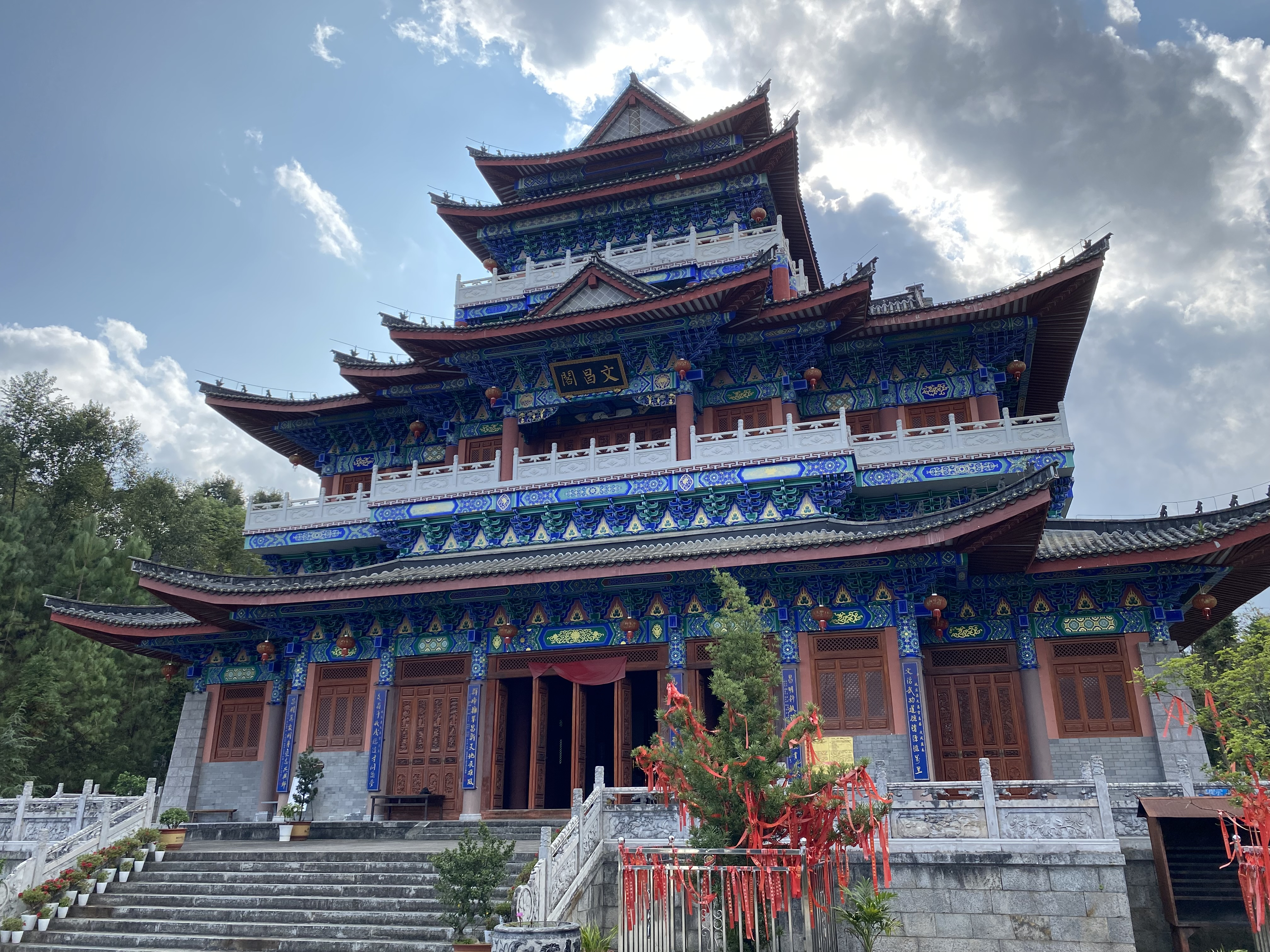
- Cityscape of county town Fengcheng Civilization Archway Fengqing Tea Factory Old Site Fengqing Confucian Temple Fengqing Wenchang Palace

- Location of Fengqing County (red) and Lincang City (pink) within Yunnan province

- Location in Yunnan
- Coordinates: 24.580°N 99.928°E
- Country: People's Republic of China
- Province: Yunnan
- Prefecture-level city: Lincang

Area
  - Total: 3,451 km^{2} (1,332 sq mi)

Population
  - Total: 420,594
- Postal code: 675900
- Division code: FQX (Telephone code: 0883)
- Website: http://www.gy.yn.net/

Fengqing County (simplified Chinese: 凤庆县; traditional Chinese: 鳳慶縣; pinyin: Fèngqìng Xiàn) is located in Lincang City, Yunnan province, China. During the Ming Dynasty it was a frontier known as Shunning Prefecture (顺宁府; 順寧府; Shùnníng Fǔ).

== Administrative divisions ==
Fengqing County has 8 towns, 2 townships and 3 ethnic townships.

8 towns

- Fengshan (凤山镇)
- Lushi (鲁史镇)
- Xiaowan (小湾镇)
- Yingpan (营盘镇)
- Sanchahe (三岔河镇)
- Mengyou (勐佑镇)
- Xueshan (雪山镇)
- Luodang (洛党镇)

2 townships

- Shili (诗礼乡)
- Dasi (大寺乡)

3 ethnic townships

- Xinhua Yi and Miao (新华彝族苗族乡)
- Yaojie Yi (腰街彝族乡)
- Guodazhai Yi and Bai (郭大寨彝族白族乡)

== Ethnic groups ==
The Fengqing County Gazetteer (1993) lists the following ethnic groups.

- Miao: 3,501 persons (1990)
  - Green Miao 青苗 / Mengsa 蒙撒 / Mengzhua 蒙爪
  - White Miao 白苗 / Mengdou 蒙豆 / Mengchu 蒙处 / Baijia 白家
  - Flowery Miao 花苗 / Mengzai 蒙栽
- Bulang 1,276 persons (1990); autonyms: Benren 本人, Laobenren 老本人
  - Dalise 大立色, Pingzhang 平掌, Qiongying 琼英 of Guodazhai Township 郭大寨乡
  - Shantoutian Village 山头田村, Sanchahe Township 三岔河乡
- Wa: 837 persons (1990)
  - Anjie 安街村, Mengzuo 勐佐乡
  - Xintian 新田, Xinzhai 新寨, Alihou 阿里侯 of Desili Township 德思里乡
- Lahu: 387 persons (1990)
  - Hongxing 红星, Qingkou 箐口, Xianfeng 先锋, Bianfudong 蝙蝠洞
  - Xinmin Village 新民村, Xueshan Township 雪山乡

== Climate ==
Climate data for Fengqing, elevation 1,569 m (5,148 ft), (1991–2020 normals, extremes 1981–2010)
Month	Jan	Feb	Mar	Apr	May	Jun	Jul	Aug	Sep	Oct	Nov	Dec	Year
Record high °C (°F)	23.9 (75.0)	27.1 (80.8)	29.2 (84.6)	32.0 (89.6)	32.7 (90.9)	32.8 (91.0)	31.9 (89.4)	31.1 (88.0)	30.5 (86.9)	29.2 (84.6)	25.6 (78.1)	24.2 (75.6)	32.8 (91.0)
Mean daily maximum °C (°F)	18.3 (64.9)	20.3 (68.5)	23.3 (73.9)	25.3 (77.5)	26.2 (79.2)	26.1 (79.0)	25.5 (77.9)	26.3 (79.3)	25.6 (78.1)	23.7 (74.7)	21.1 (70.0)	18.8 (65.8)	23.4 (74.1)
Daily mean °C (°F)	10.7 (51.3)	12.7 (54.9)	15.7 (60.3)	18.2 (64.8)	20.4 (68.7)	21.7 (71.1)	21.3 (70.3)	21.3 (70.3)	20.2 (68.4)	17.9 (64.2)	14.0 (57.2)	11.1 (52.0)	17.1 (62.8)
Mean daily minimum °C (°F)	5.5 (41.9)	7.0 (44.6)	9.8 (49.6)	12.8 (55.0)	16.2 (61.2)	18.8 (65.8)	18.7 (65.7)	18.4 (65.1)	17.2 (63.0)	14.6 (58.3)	9.8 (49.6)	6.4 (43.5)	12.9 (55.3)
Record low °C (°F)	−0.3 (31.5)	1.2 (34.2)	−0.2 (31.6)	7.1 (44.8)	8.9 (48.0)	13.2 (55.8)	13.4 (56.1)	14.1 (57.4)	10.0 (50.0)	6.3 (43.3)	2.2 (36.0)	−1.6 (29.1)	−1.6 (29.1)
Average precipitation mm (inches)	40.3 (1.59)	31.8 (1.25)	40.7 (1.60)	62.2 (2.45)	129.2 (5.09)	183.2 (7.21)	240.6 (9.47)	209.2 (8.24)	173.0 (6.81)	137.9 (5.43)	43.0 (1.69)	16.8 (0.66)	1,307.9 (51.49)
Average precipitation days (≥ 0.1 mm)	4.5	5.9	7.6	11.7	15.1	21.9	25.9	23.1	20.3	16.1	6.2	3.4	161.7
Average relative humidity (%)	66	59	55	60	69	78	84	83	83	82	77	73	72
Mean monthly sunshine hours	224.0	214.7	227.5	216.2	185.6	107.3	88.0	118.7	120.2	150.7	199.7	215.4	2,068
Percentage possible sunshine	67	67	61	56	45	26	21	30	33	42	61	66	48
Source: China Meteorological Administration
