= Dali–Lincang railway =

Railway line in southwest China

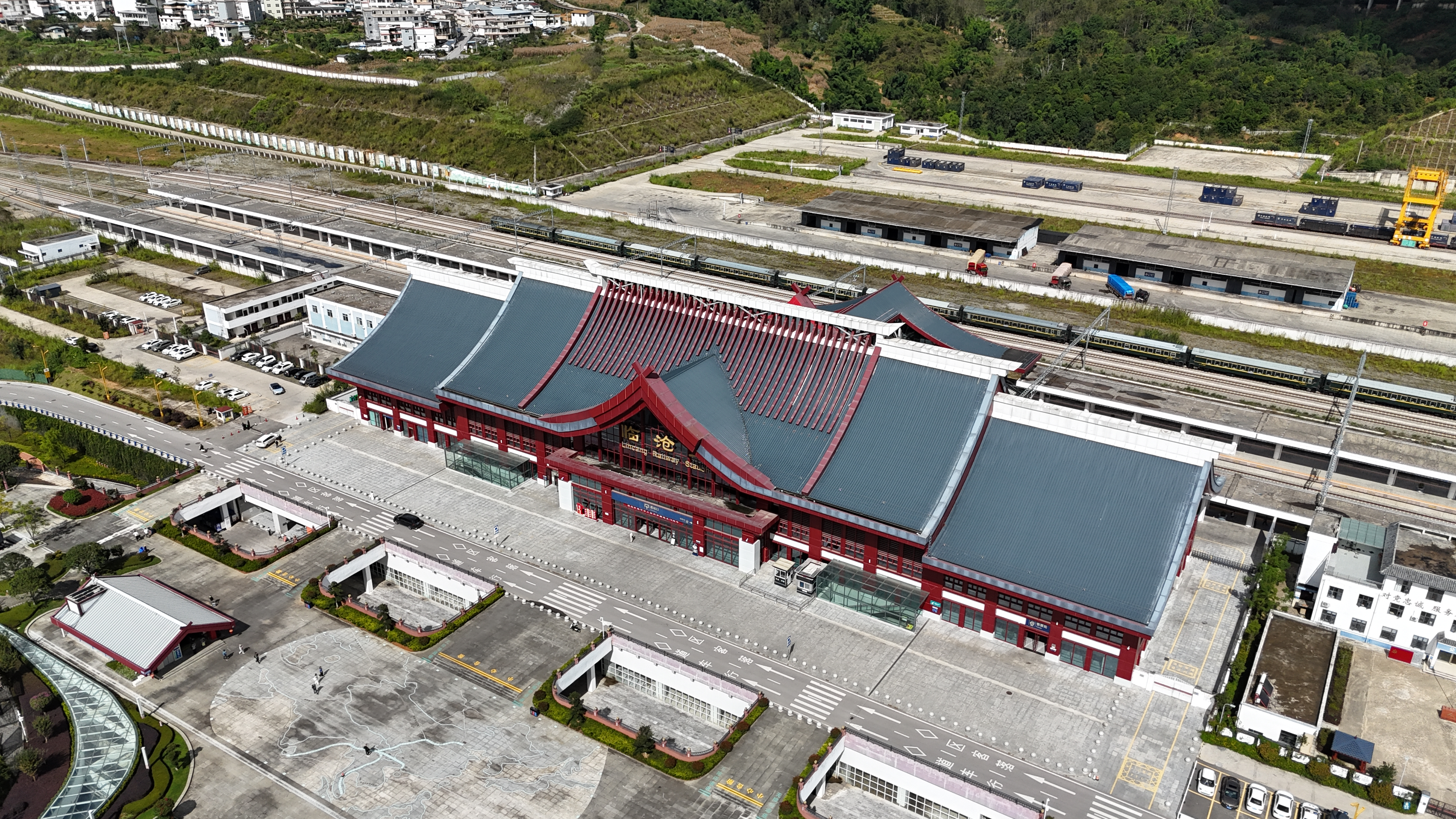
- Lincang Railway Station

Overview
- Native name: 大临铁路
- Status: Operating
- Termini: Dali; Lincang

Service
- Type: Heavy rail
- Operator(s): China Railway Kunming Group

History
- Opened: 30 December 2020

Technical
- Line length: 201.8 km (125 mi)
- Track gauge: 1,435 mm (4 ft 8 1/2 in) standard gauge
- Electrification: 50 Hz 25,000 V
- Operating speed: 160 km/h (99 mph)

Chinese name
- Traditional Chinese: 大臨鐵路
- Simplified Chinese: 大临铁路
Transcriptions
Standard Mandarin
- Hanyu Pinyin: Dàlín Tiělù

The Dali–Lincang railway (Chinese: 大临铁路) is a single-track electrified railway in China. The combined passenger and freight line is 201.8 kilometres (125.4 mi) long and has a design speed of 160 kilometres per hour (99 mph).

== History ==
In December 2020, electrification of the railway was completed. It opened on 30 December 2020. Initial service provision was three trains in each direction between Dali and Lincang, and one train per day in each direction between Kunming and Lincang. Services will be increased further from 20 January 2021. An extension proposed to Myanmar border town of Mengding and Qingshuihe National Class I border port, a total extension length of 167 kilometers and a design speed of 160 kilometers per hour. It has been included in the national railway "14th Five-Year Plan" development planning research project in April 2023, but operated as separate line.

== Major Passenger stations ==
- Dali
- Weishan
- Xiaowan East (opened on November 6, 2021)
- Yunxian
- Lincang
