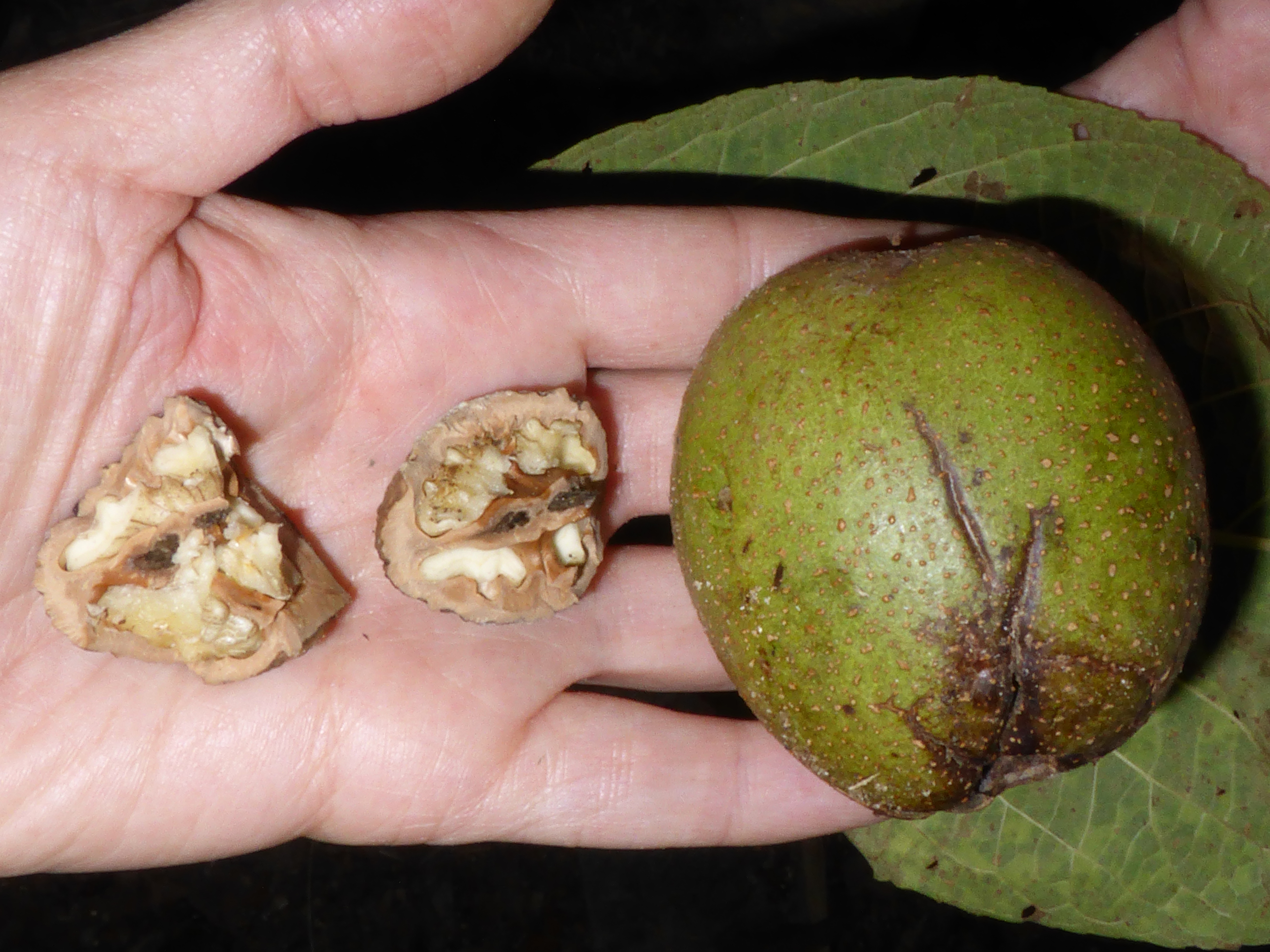
- Juglans sigillata nuts

Scientific classification
- Kingdom: Plantae
- Clade: Tracheophytes
- Clade: Angiosperms
- Clade: Eudicots
- Clade: Rosids
- Order: Fagales
- Family: Juglandaceae
- Genus: Juglans
- Section: Juglans sect. Juglans
- Species: J. sigillata

Binomial name
- Juglans sigillata Dode

= Juglans sigillata =

Species of flowering plant

Juglans sigillata, common name iron walnut (Chinese: 泡核桃, pao he tao), is a species of tree in the walnut family Juglandaceae native to the eastern Himalayas and western China. The tree has been cultivated for its edible walnuts, and there have been at least 80 authorised or approved cultivars produced after successful implementation of grafting technology.

== Description ==
Iron walnut is a medium-sized deciduous tree reaching heights up to 25 metres. The leaves are 15–50 centimetres long, alternate, compound, with 9–11(–15) leaflets, each 6–18 cm long and 3–8 cm wide. The leaflets have entire or minutely serrated margins. The nuts are globose to oval, with a pointed apex and bumps and seal-like depressions (sigillatae, from which the scientific name derives) in the very thick, hard shell (from which the common name "iron walnut" derives).

== Taxonomy ==
Iron walnut was long known in China before it was formally described in 1906 and given the scientific name Juglans sigillata by French botanist Louis-Albert Dode. Subsequently, it was largely neglected in western scientific literature until studied by the Chinese botanists Ko Zen Kuang and An Ming Lu in the Flora of China series in 1979.

== Uses ==
The tree has been cultivated for its edible nuts, and there have been at least 80 authorised or approved cultivars produced after successful implementation of grafting technology. It is widely cultivated in China for walnut production and wood. It is commonly found in Yunnan, China's top walnut producing region in terms of acreage and yield, but also is found in Guizhou, Sichuan and Tibet in China. It is sometimes grown in gardens and parks as an ornamental plant. Outside of its native range, it was first cultivated at Hackfalls Arboretum in New Zealand in about 2000, and then more widely from 2005.

J. sigillata is closely related to the Persian walnut Juglans regia. A 536.50-Mb genome has been sequenced to provide a solid foundation for additional genomic studies in nut crops and related species, as well providing valuable resources for plant breeders. Demonstrating an estimated divergence time between J. sigillata and the more widely cultivated Juglans regia 49 million years ago.
