= Nanjian Yi Autonomous County =

Nanjian County 南涧县
- Autonomous county
- 南涧彝族自治县; Nanjian Yi Autonomous County
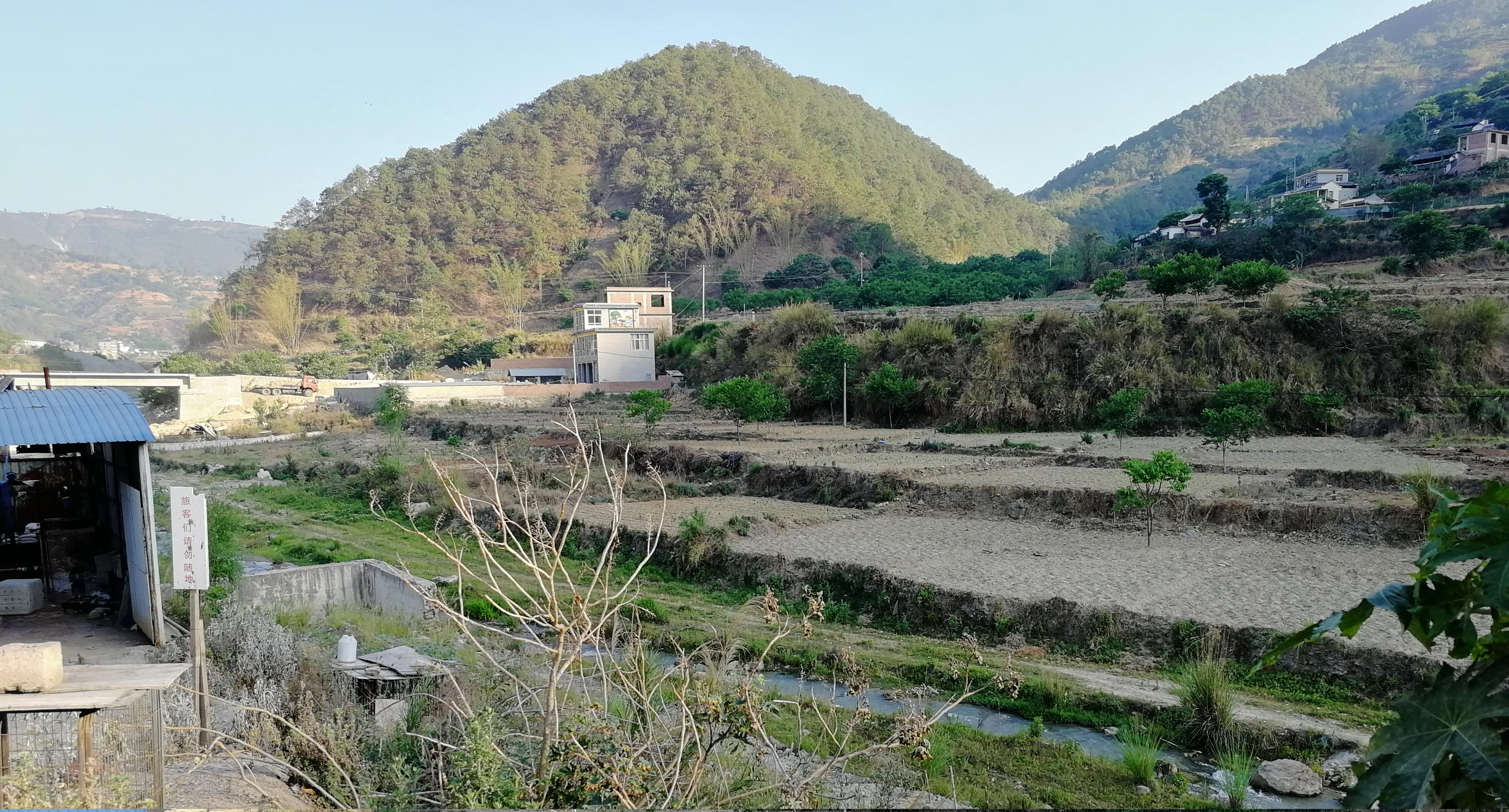

- Location of Nanjian County (red) and Dali Prefecture (pink) within Yunnan

- Location within Yunnan Location within China
- Coordinates: 25°02′35″N 100°30′00″E
- Country: China
- Province: Yunnan
- Autonomous prefecture: Dali
- County seat: Nanjian

Area
  - Total: 1,731.63 km^{2} (668.59 sq mi)

Population (2020 census)
  - Total: 192,942
  - Density: 111.422/km^{2} (288.582/sq mi)
- Time zone: UTC+8 (CST)
- Postal code: 675700
- Area code: 0872
- Climate: Cwa
- Website: www.zgnj.gov.cn

Nanjian Yi Autonomous County (simplified Chinese: 南涧彝族自治县; traditional Chinese: 南澗彝族自治縣; pinyin: Nánjiàn Yízú Zìzhìxiàn) is a county in the Dali Bai Autonomous Prefecture located in northwestern Yunnan province, southwest China. It borders Midu County to the east, Jingdong County and Yun County to the south, Fengqing County to the west and Weishan County to the north.

== Administrative divisions ==
Nanjian Yi Autonomous County has 5 towns and 3 townships.

5 towns

- Nanjian (南涧镇)
- Xiaowandong (小湾东镇)
- Gonglang (公郎镇)
- Baohua (宝华镇)
- Wuliangshan (无量山镇)

3 townships

- Yongcui (拥翠乡)
- Leqiu (乐秋乡)
- Bixi (碧溪乡)

== Ethnic groups ==
The Nanjian County Gazetteer (1993) lists the following ethnic groups.

- Yi (Western and Central Yi languages)
  - Black Yi, White Yi
  - Luoluo 倮倮, Black Luoluo 黑倮倮, White Luoluo 白倮倮
  - Tuzu 土族
  - Xiangtang 香堂
  - Micha 密岔
  - Laluobo 腊罗拨/腊鲁拨
  - Enibo 额尼拨 (Central Yi)
  - Misabo 迷撒拨
- Hui
- Bai (only some can speak Bai)
- Miao
  - White Miao 白苗 (Menglou 孟镂)
  - Green Miao 青苗 (Mengsa 孟撒): in Guihuaqing 桂花箐, Weibixi Township 唯碧溪乡
  - Chinese Miao 汉苗 (Mengzhua 孟抓)
- Bulang (autonym: Pu 濮; exonyms: Puman 濮曼, Pumanzi 濮蛮子): along the Jiancang River 涧沧江 in Wangjiang 望江, Wanzi 湾子, Lelongzhai 乐龙寨, Goujie 狗街, Yanzijiao 岩子脚, Luodihe 落底河
- Lisu
- Han

In Nanjian County, ethnic Bulang are located in Banqiao Village 板桥村, Langcang Township 浪沧乡 (Dali Prefecture Gazetteer, Vol. 9 1998:127).

== Transportation ==
- China National Highway 214
- Xiaowan East railway station

== Climate ==
Climate data for Nanjian, elevation 1,377 m (4,518 ft), (1991–2020 normals, extremes 1981–present)
Month	Jan	Feb	Mar	Apr	May	Jun	Jul	Aug	Sep	Oct	Nov	Dec	Year
Record high °C (°F)	26.5 (79.7)	29.7 (85.5)	31.4 (88.5)	34.6 (94.3)	36.1 (97.0)	35.7 (96.3)	34.2 (93.6)	33.9 (93.0)	34.2 (93.6)	31.7 (89.1)	29.8 (85.6)	25.7 (78.3)	36.1 (97.0)
Mean daily maximum °C (°F)	20.5 (68.9)	22.7 (72.9)	25.8 (78.4)	28.3 (82.9)	29.5 (85.1)	29.9 (85.8)	28.8 (83.8)	29.1 (84.4)	28.3 (82.9)	26.3 (79.3)	23.4 (74.1)	20.8 (69.4)	26.1 (79.0)
Daily mean °C (°F)	12.3 (54.1)	14.7 (58.5)	18.1 (64.6)	20.9 (69.6)	23.4 (74.1)	24.8 (76.6)	23.9 (75.0)	23.5 (74.3)	22.4 (72.3)	19.9 (67.8)	15.6 (60.1)	12.6 (54.7)	19.3 (66.8)
Mean daily minimum °C (°F)	5.6 (42.1)	7.7 (45.9)	11.1 (52.0)	14.7 (58.5)	18.3 (64.9)	21.1 (70.0)	20.7 (69.3)	20.0 (68.0)	18.7 (65.7)	15.8 (60.4)	10.1 (50.2)	6.4 (43.5)	14.2 (57.5)
Record low °C (°F)	0.5 (32.9)	2.4 (36.3)	0.6 (33.1)	9.1 (48.4)	11.2 (52.2)	14.8 (58.6)	15.4 (59.7)	14.8 (58.6)	11.3 (52.3)	9.0 (48.2)	2.5 (36.5)	−0.8 (30.6)	−0.8 (30.6)
Average precipitation mm (inches)	22.8 (0.90)	15.8 (0.62)	20.9 (0.82)	28.1 (1.11)	60.4 (2.38)	89.1 (3.51)	150.3 (5.92)	144.7 (5.70)	99.7 (3.93)	70.5 (2.78)	28.3 (1.11)	9.8 (0.39)	740.4 (29.17)
Average precipitation days (≥ 0.1 mm)	4.5	4.5	6.5	8.1	9.7	11.7	18.5	17.4	13.9	11.3	5.1	3.0	114.2
Average snowy days	0.1	0	0	0	0	0	0	0	0	0	0	0	0.1
Average relative humidity (%)	58	51	47	49	56	64	73	75	75	73	69	65	63
Mean monthly sunshine hours	233.2	221.8	247.4	243.5	227.8	166.9	129.6	146.3	149.2	173.0	212.2	225.4	2,376.3
Percentage possible sunshine	70	69	66	64	55	41	31	37	41	49	65	69	55
Source: China Meteorological Administration All-time Nov Records
