= List of Major National Historical and Cultural Sites in Yunnan =

This list is of Major Sites Protected for their Historical and Cultural Value at the National Level in the Province of Yunnan, People's Republic of China.

Site	Chinese name	Location	Designation	Image
Shizhongshan Caves	Shizhongshan Shiku 石钟山石窟	Jianchuan County; 26°21′36″N 99°50′11″E	1-0047-4-014	Upload file
Three Pagodas of Chongsheng Temple	Chongshengsi Santa 崇圣寺三塔	Dali City; 25°42′31″N 100°08′45″E	1-0065-3-018	Upload file
Cuan Baozi Stele	Cuan Baozi bei 爨宝子碑	Qilin, Qujing; 25°29′32″N 103°47′55″E	1-0126-4-002	Upload file
Cuan Longyan Stele	Cuan Longyan bei 爨龙颜碑	Luliang County; 24°55′30″N 103°41′12″E	1-0127-4-003	Upload file
Duan and Thirty-Seven Tribes Stele	Duanshi yu sanshiqi bu huimeng bei 段氏与三十七部会盟碑	Qilin, Qujing; 25°29′33″N 103°47′55″E	1-0129-4-005	Upload file
Taihe City ruins	Taihe cheng yizhi 太和城遗址	Dali City; 25°38′11″N 100°11′50″E	1-0157-1-022	Upload file
Golden Hall of Taihe Palace	Taihe gong Jindian 太和宫金殿	Panlong, Kunming; 25°05′25″N 102°46′10″E	2-0038-3-023	Upload file
Dharani Pillar of Ksitigarbha Temple	Dizang si jingchuang 地藏寺经幢	Guandu, Kunming; 25°02′07″N 102°43′37″E	2-0045-4-002	Upload file
Yuanmou Man site	Yuanmou yuanren yizhi 元谋猿人遗址	Yuanmou County; 25°40′37″N 101°54′37″E	2-0046-1-001	Upload file
Yunnan Military Academy site	Yunnan Lujun Jiangwutang jiuzhi 云南陆军讲武堂旧址	Wuhua, Kunming; 25°03′03″N 102°41′57″E	3-0018-5-018	Upload file
Tomb of Nie Er	Nie Er mu 聂耳墓	Xishan, Kunming; 24°57′41″N 102°37′58″E	3-0041-5-041	Upload file
Guangyun Temple	Guangyun Miansi 广允缅寺	Cangyuan County; 23°09′17″N 99°14′59″E	3-0123-3-071	Upload file
Jingzhen Octagonal Pavilion	Jingzhen Bajiaoting 景真八角亭	Menghai County; 21°57′27″N 100°18′14″E	3-0124-3-072	Upload file
Manfeilong Pagoda	Manfeilong ta 曼飞龙塔	Jinghong; 21°36′03″N 100°41′11″E	3-0157-3-105	Upload file
Yuan Zi Rock Carvings	Yuan Zi tiji moya shike 袁滋题记摩崖石刻	Yanjin County; 28°02′25″N 104°06′48″E	3-0174-4-011	Upload file
Iron Column of Nanzhao	Nanzhao tiezhu 南诏铁柱	Midu County; 25°20′41″N 100°26′09″E	3-0180-6-001	Upload file
Ramapithecus Fossil Site	Lama guyuan huashi didian 腊玛古猿化石地点	Lufeng; 25°13′11″N 102°03′24″E	3-0181-1-001	Upload file
Shifodong site	Shifo dong yizhi 石佛洞遗址	Gengma County; 23°21′52″N 99°27′12″E	4-0018-1-018	Upload file
Miaozhan Temple Diamond Throne Pagoda	Miaozhan si Jingangta 妙湛寺金刚塔	Guandu, Kunming; 24°57′35″N 102°45′21″E	4-0087-3-009	Upload file
Grand Baoji Palace and Glazed Hall	Dabaoji gong yu Liulidian 大宝积宫与琉璃殿	Yulong County; 26°57′30″N 100°12′56″E	4-0159-3-081	Upload file
Zhongxin Assembly Hall	Zhongxin zhen gongtang 中心镇公堂	Shangri-La; 27°48′56″N 99°42′23″E	4-0186-3-108	Upload file
Nalou Governor Headquarters	Nalou changguansi shu 纳楼长官司署	Jianshui County; 23°18′33″N 102°48′01″E	4-0213-5-015	Upload file
Nandian Xuanfu Headquarters	Nandian xuanfusi shu 南甸宣抚司署	Lianghe County; 24°48′37″N 98°17′50″E	4-0214-5-016	Upload file
National Heroes Cemetery	Guoshuo mu yuan 国殇墓园	Tengchong; 25°01′46″N 98°28′52″E	4-0246-5-048	Upload file
Hanzhuang City ruins	Hanzhuang chengzhi 汉庄城址	Longyang, Baoshan; 25°05′05″N 99°09′44″E	5-0106-1-106	Upload file
Shizhaishan Tombs	Shizhaishan gumuqun 石寨山古墓群	Jinning, Kunming; 24°43′N 102°41′E	5-0179-2-035	Upload file
Lijiashan Tombs	Lijiashan gumuqun 李家山古墓群	Jiangchuan, Yuxi; 24°24′07″N 102°47′14″E	5-0180-2-036	Upload file
Bai Architecture of Xizhou	Xizhou Baizu gujianzhuqun 喜洲白族古建筑群	Dali City; 25°51′20″N 100°07′54″E	5-0404-3-210	Upload file
Jianshui Confucian Temple	Jianshui Wenmiao 建水文庙	Jianshui County; 23°37′05″N 102°49′11″E	5-0405-3-211	Upload file
Qiongzhu Temple	Qiongzhu si 筇竹寺	Wuhua, Kunming; 25°04′08″N 102°37′22″E	5-0406-3-212	Upload file
Kublai Khan's Conquest of Yunnan Stele	Yuanshizu Ping Yunnan bei 元世祖平云南碑	Dali City; 25°41′40″N 100°08′55″E	5-0464-4-022	Upload file
Cangyuan Rock Paintings	Cangyuan yahua 沧源崖画	Cangyuan County; 23°16′25″N 99°18′48″E	5-0465-4-023	Upload file
Baiyangcun site	Baiyangcun yizhi 白羊村遗址	Binchuan County; 25°50′52″N 100°35′07″E	6-0187-1-187	Upload file
Longyutushan City ruins	Longyoutushan chengzhi 巄𭖂图山城址	Weishan County; 25°21′05″N 100°13′19″E	6-0188-1-188	Upload file
Batatai Tombs	Bata tai muqun 八塔台墓群	Qilin, Qujing; 25°31′45″N 103°53′33″E	6-0281-2-061	Upload file
Yingpancun Tombs	Yingpancun muqun 营盘村墓群	Yongsheng County; 26°36′15″N 100°51′24″E	6-0282-2-062	Upload file
Shuimu Temple Pagoda	Shuimusi ta 水目寺塔	Xiangyun County; 25°22′12″N 100°37′11″E	6-0738-3-441	Upload file
Pagodas of Huiguang Temple and Changle Temple	Huiguangsi ta he Changlesi ta 惠光寺塔和常乐寺塔	Xishan, Kunming; 25°01′55″N 102°42′24″E	6-0739-3-442	Upload file
Fotu Temple Pagoda	Fotusi ta 佛图寺塔	Dali City; 25°37′00″N 100°12′14″E	6-0740-3-443	Upload file
Dayao White Pagoda	Dayao bai ta 大姚白塔	Dayao County; 25°43′37″N 101°18′53″E	6-0741-3-444	Upload file
Caoxi Temple	Caoxi si 曹溪寺	Anning; 24°57′11″N 102°26′44″E	6-0742-3-445	Upload file
Old Architecture of Xiushan	Xiushan gujianzhuqun 秀山古建筑群	Tonghai County; 24°06′23″N 102°45′15″E	6-0743-3-446	Upload file
Main Hall of Zhilin Temple	Zhilin si dadian 指林寺大殿	Jianshui County; 23°36′47″N 102°49′16″E	6-0744-3-447	Upload file
Stone Town of Baoshan	Baoshan Shitou cheng 宝山石头城	Yulong County; 27°28′30″N 100°25′49″E	6-0745-3-448	Upload file
Anning Confucian Temple	Anning Wenmiao 安宁文庙	Anning; 24°55′35″N 102°29′08″E	6-0746-3-449	Upload file
Zhoucheng Confucian Temple and Martial Temple	Zhoucheng Wenmiao he Wumiao 州城文庙和武庙	Binchuan County; 25°44′28″N 100°34′52″E	6-0747-3-450	Upload file
Old Architecture of Zhenqing Temple	Zhenqingguan gujianzhuqun 真庆观古建筑群	Panlong, Kunming; 25°02′17″N 102°43′29″E	6-0748-3-451	Upload file
Old Architecture of Heilongtan	Heilongtan gujianzhuqun 黑龙潭古建筑群	Gucheng, Lijiang; 26°53′15″N 100°14′00″E	6-0749-3-452	Upload file
Longhua Temple	Longhua si 龙华寺	Yao'an County; 25°35′26″N 101°11′20″E	6-0750-3-453	Upload file
Baoshan Yuhuang Pavilion	Baoshan Yuhuangge 保山玉皇阁	Longyang, Baoshan; 25°07′11″N 99°09′15″E	6-0751-3-454	Upload file
Changyang Lou	Zhaoyang lou 朝阳楼	Jianshui County; 23°37′09″N 102°49′46″E	6-0752-3-455	Upload file
Old Architecture of Ximen Street	Ximenjie gujianzhuqun 西门街古建筑群	Jianchuan County; 26°32′04″N 99°54′01″E	6-0753-3-456	Upload file
Xingjiao Temple, Shaxi	Shaxi Xingjiao si 沙溪兴教寺	Jianchuan County; 26°19′11″N 99°51′05″E	6-0754-3-457	Upload file
Jinlong Bridge	Jinlong qiao 金龙桥	Gucheng, Lijiang; 26°47′04″N 100°23′19″E	6-0755-3-458	Upload file
Menglian Xuanfu Residence	Menglian xuanfusi shu 孟连宣抚司署	Menglian County; 22°20′00″N 99°34′39″E	6-0756-3-459	Upload file
Manduan Buddhist Temple	Manduan Fosi 曼短佛寺	Menghai County; 21°56′37″N 100°21′16″E	6-0757-3-460	Upload file
Shuanglong Bridge	Shuanglong qiao 双龙桥	Jianshui County; 23°36′30″N 102°47′34″E	6-0758-3-461	Upload file
Changchun Caves	Changchun dong 长春洞	Weishan County; 25°10′12″N 100°20′40″E	6-0759-3-462	Upload file
Shouguo Temple	Shouguo si 寿国寺	Weixi County; 27°38′25″N 99°00′51″E	6-0760-3-463	Upload file
Guild Halls of Huize	Huize huiguan 会泽会馆	Huize County; 26°25′05″N 103°17′40″E	6-0761-3-464	Upload file
Meng Xiaoju Stele	Meng Xiaoju bei 孟孝琚碑	Zhaoyang, Zhaotong; 27°20′11″N 103°43′02″E	6-0861-4-051	Upload file
Wang Renqiu Stele	Wang Renqiu bei 王仁求碑	Anning; 24°45′06″N 102°24′30″E	6-0862-4-052	Upload file
Tomb Stele of Ma Hazhi	Ma Haha muzhi 马哈只墓碑	Jinning, Kunming; 24°40′15″N 102°35′24″E	6-0863-4-053	Upload file
Wujiazhai Railway Bridge	Wujiazhai tielu qiao 五家寨铁路桥	Pingbian County; 23°13′10″N 103°45′19″E	6-1053-5-180	Upload file
Cizhong Catholic Church	Cizhong jiaotang 茨中教堂	Deqin County; 28°01′59″N 98°54′22″E	6-1054-5-181	Upload file
Shilongba Hydropower Station	Shilongba shuidianzhan 石龙坝水电站	Xishan, Kunming; 24°51′28″N 102°31′24″E	6-1055-5-182	Upload file
Old Mengzi Customs House	Mengzi haiguan jiuzhi 蒙自海关旧址	Mengzi City; 23°22′00″N 103°24′22″E	6-1056-5-183	Upload file
Jijie railway station	Jijie huochezhan 鸡街火车站	Gejiu; 23°31′14″N 103°13′27″E	6-1057-5-184	Upload file
Qihe Lou	Qihelou 企鹤楼	Shiping County; 23°43′15″N 102°29′15″E	6-1058-5-185	Upload file
Chen Family Ancestral Temple	Chenshi zongci 陈氏宗祠	Shiping County; 23°44′49″N 102°24′06″E	6-1059-5-186	Upload file
Heshun Library	Heshun tushuguan jiuzhi 和顺图书馆旧址	Tengchong; 25°00′50″N 98°27′27″E	6-1060-5-187	Upload file
Yunyan Pagoda	Yunyan ta 允燕塔	Yingjiang County; 24°41′47″N 97°56′54″E	6-1061-5-188	Upload file
National Southwestern Associated University site	Guoli Xinan Lianhe Daxue jiuzhi 国立西南联合大学旧址	Wuhua, Kunming; 25°03′33″N 102°41′45″E	6-1062-5-189	Upload file
Songshan Battlefield	Songshan zhanyi jiuzhi 松山战役旧址	Longling County; 24°44′28″N 98°54′20″E	6-1063-5-190	Upload file
Memorial Hall to Victory against the Japanese	Kangzhan shengli jinian tang 抗战胜利纪念堂	Wuhua, Kunming; 25°02′38″N 102°42′21″E	6-1064-5-191	Upload file
Monument to the National Unity Oath	Minzu tuanjie shici bei 民族团结誓词碑	Ning'er County; 23°04′06″N 101°02′36″E	6-1065-5-192	Upload file
Yuanmou Hominoid Fossil Site	Yuanmou guyuan huashi didian 元谋古猿化石地点	Yuanmou County; 25°50′44″N 101°44′08″E	7-0414-1-414	Upload file
Dahe Site	Dahe yizhi 大河遗址	Fuyuan County; 25°32′10″N 104°18′35″E	7-0415-1-415	Upload file
Yushuiping Site	Yushuiping yizhi 玉水坪遗址	Lanping County; 26°43′18″N 99°30′44″E	7-0416-1-416	Upload file
Dadunzi Site	Dadunzi yizhi 大墩子遗址	Yuanmou County; 25°42′22″N 101°54′46″E	7-0417-1-417	Upload file
Haimenkou Site	Haimenkou yizhi 海门口遗址	Jianchuan County; 26°28′10″N 99°55′11″E	7-0418-1-418	Upload file
Yinsuo Island Site	Yinsuodao yizhi 银梭岛遗址	Dali City; 25°41′10″N 100°16′09″E	7-0419-1-419	Upload file
Yuxi Kiln Sites	Yuxi yaozhi 玉溪窑址	Hongta, Yuxi; 24°20′14″N 102°33′17″E	7-0420-1-420	Upload file
Tea Horse Road	Chama gudao 茶马古道	Sichuan, Yunnan and Guizhou	7-0516-1-516	Upload file
Wanjiaba Tombs	Wanjiaba gumuqun 万家坝古墓群	Chuxiong City; 25°00′52″N 101°33′35″E	7-0660-2-144	Upload file
Jinlianshan and Xueshan Sites	Jinlianshan Xueshan yizhiqun 金莲山、学山遗址群	Chengjiang; 24°39′08″N 102°56′24″E	7-0661-2-145	Upload file
Luohanshan Ancient Tombs	Luohanshan gumuqun 罗汉山古墓群	Qilin, Qujing; 25°24′33″N 103°49′41″E	7-0662-2-146	Upload file
Washi Hanging Coffins	Washi xuanguan 瓦石悬棺	Weixin County; 27°49′38″N 104°46′48″E	7-0663-2-147	Upload file
Shudang Cremation Burial Tombs	Shundang huozang muqun 顺荡火葬墓群	Yunlong County; 26°16′37″N 99°22′45″E	7-0664-2-148	Upload file
Keduguan Post Road	Keduguan yidao 可渡关驿道	Xuanwei; 26°37′03″N 104°16′13″E	7-1371-3-669	Upload file
Hongsheng Temple Pagoda	Hongshengsi ta 弘圣寺塔	Dali City; 25°41′17″N 100°09′20″E	7-1372-3-670	Upload file
Luliang Dajue Temple	Luliang Dajue si 陆良大觉寺	Luliang County; 25°01′30″N 103°39′56″E	7-1373-3-671	Upload file
Dajuegong Mural	Dajue gong bihua 大觉宫壁画	Gucheng, Lijiang; 26°55′32″N 100°12′15″E	7-1374-3-672	Upload file
Defeng Temple	Defeng si 德丰寺	Yao'an County; 25°30′24″N 101°14′18″E	7-1375-3-673	Upload file
Dengjue Temple	Dengjue si 等觉寺	Weishan County; 25°13′56″N 100°18′34″E	7-1376-3-674	Upload file
Mengwang Pagoda and Xibei Pagoda	Mengwang ta ji Xibei ta 勐旺塔及西北塔	Linxiang, Lincang; 23°56′29″N 100°02′08″E	7-1377-3-675	Upload file
Chuxiong Confucian Temple	Chuxiong Wenmiao 楚雄文庙	Chuxiong City; 25°02′12″N 101°32′49″E	7-1378-3-676	Upload file
Rural Buildings of the Bai People in Nuodeng	Nuodeng Baizu xiangtu jianzhuqun 诺邓白族乡土建筑群	Yunlong County; 25°55′05″N 99°22′39″E	7-1379-3-677	Upload file
Nong's Tusi Government Office	Nongshi tusiu yashu 侬氏土司衙署	Guangnan County; 24°03′05″N 105°03′50″E	7-1380-3-678	Upload file
Dai People's Buddhism Temples in Jinggu	Jinggu Daizu Fosi jianzhuqun 景谷傣族佛寺建筑群	Jinggu County; 23°18′03″N 100°21′11″E	7-1381-3-679	Upload file
Ancient Bridges along Bijiang River	Bijiang gu qiaoliang qun 沘江古桥梁群	Yunlong County	7-1382-3-680	Upload file
Old Buildings of Jingfeng Pavilion	Jingfengge gujianzhuqun 景风阁古建筑群	Jianchuan County; 26°32′15″N 99°53′48″E	7-1383-3-681	Upload file
Laihe Pavilion	Laihe ting 来鹤亭	Shiping County; 23°42′05″N 102°30′57″E	7-1384-3-682	Upload file
Old Buildings of Yunnanyii	Yunnan yi gujianzhuqun 云南驿古建筑群	Xiangyun County; 25°25′29″N 100°41′26″E	7-1385-3-683	Upload file
Daguan Lou	Daguan lou 大观楼	Xishan, Kunming; 25°01′38″N 102°40′21″E	7-1386-3-684	Upload file
Wenchang Palace, Qiluo	Qiluo Wenchang gong 绮罗文昌宫	Tengchong; 24°59′27″N 98°29′18″E	7-1387-3-685	Upload file
Jingdong Confucian Temple	Jingdong Wenmiao 景东文庙	Jingdong County; 24°27′03″N 100°49′48″E	7-1388-3-686	Upload file
Xingsu Bridge and Fengyu Bridge	Xingsu qiao he Fengyu qiao 星宿桥和丰裕桥	Lufeng; 25°09′07″N 102°04′27″E	7-1389-3-687	Upload file
Zheng Ancestral Hall	Zhengshi zongci 郑氏宗祠	Shiping County; 23°44′47″N 102°24′13″E	7-1390-3-688	Upload file
Zhu's Garden, Jianshui	Jianshui Zhujia huayuan 建水朱家花园	Jianshui County; 23°37′07″N 102°49′33″E	7-1391-3-689	Upload file
Manchunman Buddhist Temple	Manchunman Fosi 曼春满佛寺	Jinghong; 21°51′05″N 100°56′29″E	7-1392-3-690	Upload file
Old Buildings of Nanzhaozhen	Nanzhaozhen gujianzhuqun 南诏镇古建筑群	Weishan County; 25°14′05″N 100°18′37″E	7-1393-3-691	Upload file
Residences of Tuanshan Village	Tuanshan minju jianzhuqun 团山民居建筑群	Jianshui County; 23°38′45″N 102°44′19″E	7-1394-3-692	Upload file
Building Complex of Shiping Confucian Temple	Shiping Wenmiao jianzhuqun 石屏文庙建筑群	Shiping County; 23°43′00″N 102°29′30″E	7-1395-3-693	Upload file
Puji Temple, Lijiang	Lijiang Puji si 丽江普济寺	Gucheng, Lijiang; 26°54′02″N 100°10′50″E	7-1396-3-694	Upload file
East City Gate of Honghe County and Yisa Residences	Honghexian Dongmen lou ji Yisa minju 红河县东门楼及迤萨民居	Honghe County; 23°22′10″N 102°25′12″E	7-1397-3-695	Upload file
Rock Art along Jinshan River	Jinshajiang yanhua 金沙江岩画	Shangri-La and Yulong County; 27°17′47″N 100°11′58″E	7-1594-4-097	Upload file
Dawangyan Rock Art	Dawangyan yanhua 大王岩岩画	Malipo County; 23°07′36″N 104°42′25″E	7-1595-4-098	Upload file
Stone Sculptures at Guanyin Pavilion	Guanyinge shike zaoxiang 观音阁石刻造像	Yongsheng County; 26°41′33″N 100°46′14″E	7-1596-4-099	Upload file
Fulintang	Fulintang 福林堂	Wuhua, Kunming; 25°02′33″N 102°42′27″E	7-1900-5-293	Upload file
Former Residence of Xiong Qinglai	Xiong Qinglai guju 熊庆来故居	Yuanjiang County; 24°01′26″N 103°22′28″E	7-1901-5-294	Upload file
Bisezhai Station	Bisezhai chezhan 碧色寨车站	Mengzi City; 23°27′55″N 103°24′39″E	7-1902-5-295	Upload file
Site of Dianxi Military Government and Dieyuan Stone Inscriptions Collection	Dianxi jun dudu fu jiuzhi ji Dieyuan jike 滇西军都督府旧址及叠园集刻	Tengchong; 25°01′31″N 98°29′18″E	7-1903-5-296	Upload file
Trading Company "Baoxinglong"	Baofenglong shanghao 宝丰隆商号	Gejiu; 23°21′16″N 103°09′19″E	7-1904-5-297	Upload file
Zhou's Courtyard	Zhoujia zhaiyuan 周家宅院	Mengzi City; 23°22′10″N 103°24′01″E	7-1905-5-298	Upload file
Nuofu Church	Nuofu jiaotang 糯福教堂	Lancang County; 22°13′16″N 99°41′51″E	7-1906-5-299	Upload file
Long's Family Temple	Longshi jiaci 龙氏家祠	Zhaoyang, Zhaotong; 27°16′52″N 103°39′53″E	7-1907-5-300	Upload file
Former Wenxingxiang Trading Company	Wenxingxiang shanghao jiuzhi 文兴祥商号旧址	Hongta, Yuxi; 24°21′19″N 102°32′37″E	7-1908-5-301	Upload file
Site of the Headquarters of Central Red Army at Dangui Villlage and Jiaoping Ferry of Jinsha River	Danguicun Zhongyang Hongjun zongbu zhudi jiuzhi yu Jinshajiang Jiaoping dukou 丹桂村中央红军总部驻地旧址与金沙江皎平渡口	Xundian County and Luquan County; 25°33′37″N 102°51′37″E	7-1909-5-302	Upload file
Longxi Shizu Manor	Longxi shizu zhuangyuan 陇西世族庄园	Xinping County; 24°00′59″N 101°32′32″E	7-1910-5-303	Upload file
Ancient Tea Plantations of Jingmai	Jingmai gu chayuan 景迈古茶园	Lancang County; 22°12′07″N 100°00′52″E	7-1941-6-005	Upload file
Honghe Hani Rice Terraces	Honghe Hani titian 红河哈尼梯田	Yuanyang County; 23°07′02″N 102°44′16″E	7-1942-6-006	Upload file
Gantangqing Site	Gantangqing yizhi 甘棠箐遗址	Jiangchuan, Yuxi; 24°18′27″N 102°50′48″E	8-0131-1-131	Upload file
Hebosuo Site	Hebosuo yizhi 河泊所遗址	Jinning, Kunming; 24°42′37″N 102°41′17″E	8-0132-1-132	Upload file
Dadianshan Site	Dadian shan yizhi 大甸山遗址	Changning County; 24°49′03″N 99°38′08″E	8-0133-1-133	Upload file
Dabona Site	Dabona yizhi 大波那遗址	Xiangyun County; 25°30′21″N 100°46′00″E	8-0134-1-134	Upload file
Muyi Site	Muyi yizhi 牡宜遗址	Guangnan County; 23°41′12″N 105°11′28″E	8-0135-1-135	Upload file
Ruins of Ancient City Zhuti	Zhuti gucheng yizhi 朱提故城遗址	Zhaoyang, Zhaotong; 27°19′47″N 103°45′03″E	8-0136-1-136	Upload file
Deyuan Ancient City Ruins	Deyuan gucheng yizhi 德源古城遗址	Eryuan County; 26°00′08″N 100°05′20″E	8-0137-1-137	Upload file
Tombs of Sayyid Ajall	Saidianchi Shansiding mu 赛典赤·赡思丁墓	Panlong and Guandu, Kunming; 25°09′27″N 102°46′36″E	8-0189-2-022	Upload file
Sanfo Hall of Wanshou Temple, Luxi	Luxi Wanshou si Sanfo dian 泸西万寿寺三佛殿	Luxi County; 24°32′22″N 103°45′27″E	8-0438-3-241	Upload file
Tuzhu Temple, Jianshui	Jianshui Tuzhu miao 建水土主庙	Jianshui County; 23°36′56″N 102°49′41″E	8-0439-3-242	Upload file
Yuhuang Pavilion, Mengzi	Mengzi Yuhuangge 蒙自玉皇阁	Mengzi City; 23°22′15″N 103°24′04″E	8-0440-3-243	Upload file
Yuhuang Pavilion and Chongwen Pagoda, Jianshui	Jianshui Yuhuangge ji Chongwen ta 建水玉皇阁及崇文塔	Jianshui County; 23°37′02″N 102°49′47″E	8-0441-3-244	Upload file
Old Buildings of Xin'ansuo	Xin'ansuo gujianzhuqun 新安所古建筑群	Mengzi City; 23°19′22″N 103°26′05″E	8-0442-3-245	Upload file
Old Buildings in Qina	Qina gujianzhuqun 期纳古建筑群	Yongsheng County; 26°23′58″N 100°39′06″E	8-0443-3-246	Upload file
Old Buildings of Tianfengshan	Tianfengshan gujianzhuqun 天峰山古建筑群	Xiangyun County; 25°17′26″N 100°54′28″E	8-0444-3-247	Upload file
Wutai Grand Temple, Midu	Midu Wutai Dasi 弥渡五台大寺	Midu County; 25°11′40″N 100°38′41″E	8-0445-3-248	Upload file
Former Bureau of Yunnan Provincial Military Commander	Yunnan Tidufu jiuzhi 云南提督府旧址	Dali City; 25°41′33″N 100°09′40″E	8-0446-3-249	Upload file
Yezhi Tusi Government Office	Yezhi tusiu yashu 叶枝土司衙署	Weixi County; 27°42′08″N 99°02′48″E	8-0447-3-250	Upload file
Huilan Bridge Pavilion	Huilan qiaoge 洄澜桥阁	Shiping County; 23°39′28″N 102°38′41″E	8-0448-3-251	Upload file
Jiangchuan Confucian Temple	Jiangchuan Wenmiao 江川文庙	Jiangchuan, Yuxi; 24°26′12″N 102°48′41″E	8-0449-3-252	Upload file
Mills along Liulang River	Liulanghe mofangqun 流浪河磨房群	Fengqing County; 24°54′30″N 99°54′10″E	8-0450-3-253	Upload file
Mojiang Confucian Temple	Mojiang Wenmiao 墨江文庙	Mojiang County; 23°26′11″N 101°41′37″E	8-0451-3-254	Upload file
Chuanzi Sluice in Haikou River	Haikou Chuanzi zha 海口川字闸	Xishan, Kunming; 24°46′58″N 102°36′05″E	8-0452-3-255	Upload file
Jianshui Xuezheng Examination Hall	Jianshui Xuezheng kaopeng 建水学政考棚	Jianshui County; 23°36′57″N 102°49′29″E	8-0453-3-256	Upload file
Lisu People Residences in Tongle	Tongle Lisuzu minju jianzhuqun 同乐傈僳族民居建筑群	Weixi County; 27°39′34″N 99°03′41″E	8-0454-3-257	Upload file
Guangzun Temple, Baoshan	Baoshan Guangzun si 保山光尊寺	Longyang, Baoshan; 25°10′44″N 99°14′09″E	8-0455-3-258	Upload file
Wenquan Cliff Inscriptions	Wenquan moya shikequn 温泉摩崖石刻群	Anning; 24°57′36″N 102°27′00″E	8-0503-4-026	Upload file
Huize Hall of Yunnai University	Yunnan Daxue Huize yuan 云南大学会泽院	Wuhua, Kunming; 25°03′21″N 102°42′08″E	8-0715-5-199	Upload file
Dali Catholic Church	Dali Tianzhu jiaotang 大理天主教堂	Dali City; 25°41′46″N 100°09′46″E	8-0716-5-200	Upload file
Lu's Mansion, Kunming	Kunming Lushi gongguan 昆明卢氏公馆	Wuhua, Kunming; 25°03′06″N 102°42′20″E	8-0717-5-201	Upload file
Huitong Bridge of Burma Road	Dianmian gonglu Huitong qiao 滇缅公路惠通桥	Longling County; 24°44′05″N 98°58′01″E	8-0718-5-202	Upload file
Modern Buildings of Fenghuangshan Observatory	Fenghuangshan tianwentai jindai jianzhu 凤凰山天文台近代建筑	Guandu, Kunming; 25°01′38″N 102°47′30″E	8-0719-5-203	Upload file
Wanting Bridge	Wanding qiao 畹町桥	Ruili; 24°04′49″N 98°04′21″E	8-0720-5-204	Upload file
Former Central Electronic Components Factory (Factory 1)	Zhongyang diangong qicai chang yichang jiuzhi 中央电工器材厂一厂旧址	Xishan, Kunming; 25°01′44″N 102°37′55″E	8-0721-5-205	Upload file
Bridges and Tunnels of Yunnan–Burma Railway at Lianxiangguan, Lufeng	Dianmian tielu Lufeng Lianxiangqiao qiaosuiqun 滇缅铁路禄丰炼象关桥隧群	Lufeng; 25°02′34″N 102°09′14″E	8-0722-5-206	Upload file
Old Campus of Fengqing Tea Factory	Fengqing chachang laochangqu jiuzhi 凤庆茶厂老厂区旧址	Fengqing County; 24°36′04″N 99°54′43″E	8-0723-5-207	Upload file
Former Kaiyuan Power Plant	Kaiyuan fadianchang jiuzhi 开远发电厂旧址	Kaiyuan; 23°41′39″N 103°14′59″E	8-0724-5-208	Upload file
Kaiyuan Changhong Bridge	Kaiyuan Changhong qiao 开远长虹桥	Kaiyuan; 23°48′56″N 103°16′34″E	8-0725-5-209	Upload file

== See also ==
- Principles for the Conservation of Heritage Sites in China
