= Jijie railway station =

Former railway station in Yunnan, China

Jijie railway station 鸡街火车站
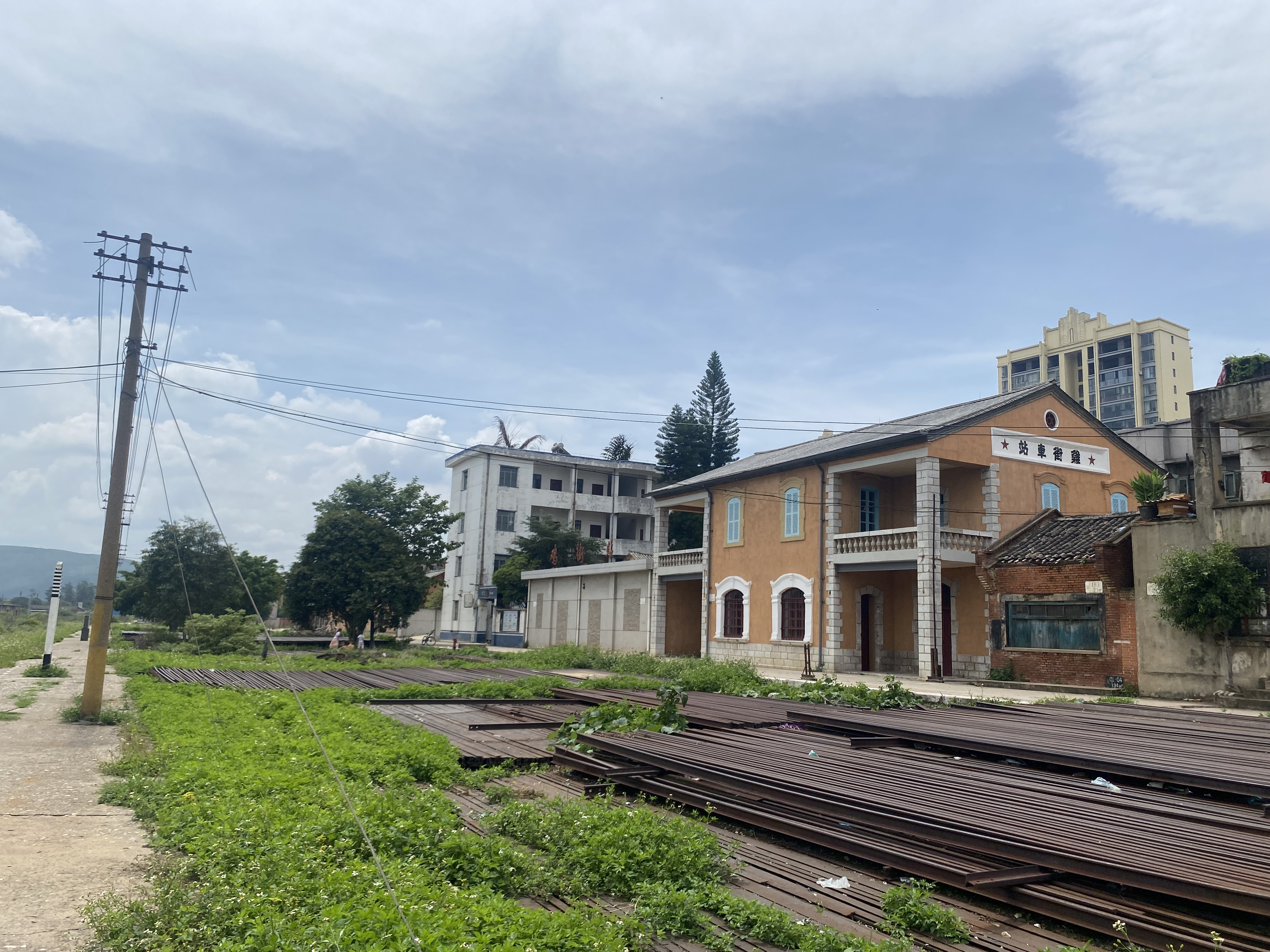

General information
- Location: Jijie Town, Gejiu City, Yunnan Province; China
- Coordinates: 23°31′14″N 103°13′27″E

History
- Opened: 1921
- Closed: 1990s
Location

Jijie railway station (Chinese: 鸡街火车站), also known as Gejiu Jijie Railway Station (个旧鸡街火车站) or Jijie station, was a station of Yunnan-Vietnam Railway. The station is located in the north of Jijie Town of Gejiu City, its construction began in 1915 and was completed and put into use in 1921. Currently, the railway station has been abandoned.

Gejiu has a long history of tin mining, which gave birth to an industrial architectural heritage group represented by the Jijie railway station.

== Buildings and lines ==
Its main building is a French-style building, with station houses, waiting rooms, storage and transportation rooms, traffic lanes. It is the central hub station of Gebishi railway, reaching Mengzi in the east, Gejiu in the south, Jianshui and Shiping in the west, and Kaiyuan and Kunming in the north.

== Heritage conservation ==
On May 25, 2006, it was selected as Major Historical and Cultural Site Protected at the National Level by State Council of the People's Republic of China.
