= Guangyun Temple =

Buddhist temple in Yunnan, China

- 广允缅寺
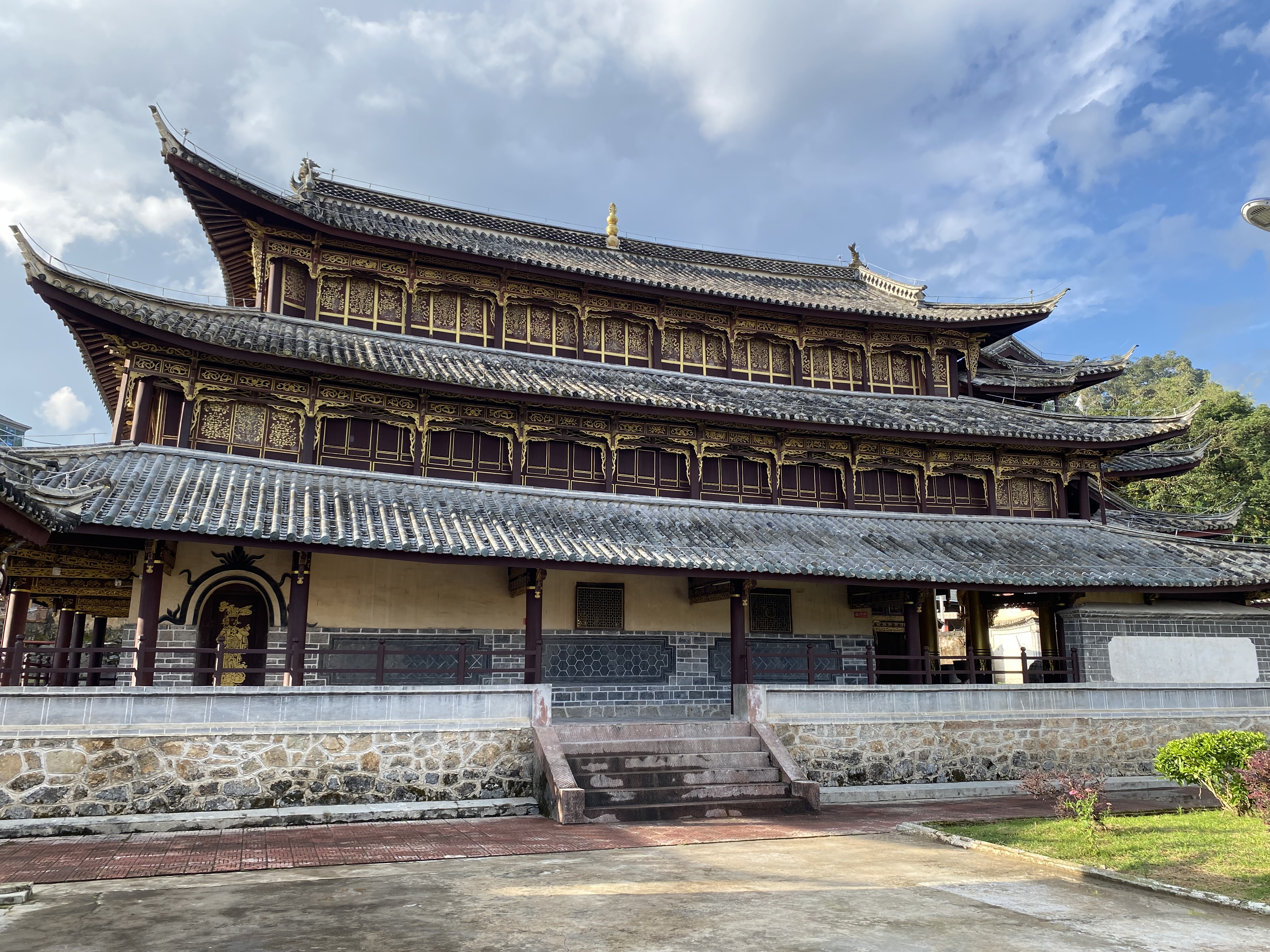

- Location in Yunnan. Guangyun Temple (China)

Religion
- Affiliation: Theravada
- Prefecture: Cangyuan Va Autonomous County
- Province: Yunnan

Location
- Country: China
- Interactive map of Guangyun Temple
- Prefecture: Cangyuan Va Autonomous County
- Coordinates: 23°09′18″N 99°14′59″E

Architecture
- Style: Chinese architecture
- Funded by: Yunnan government
- Established: 1821-1850
- Completed: 1828

Guangyun Temple (simplified Chinese: 广允缅寺; traditional Chinese: 廣允緬寺; pinyin: Guǎngyǔnmiǎn Sì), also known as Xuetang Temple (simplified Chinese: 学堂缅寺; traditional Chinese: 學堂緬寺; lit. 'School Temple'), is a Buddhist temple located in the Cangyuan Va Autonomous County of Yunnan, China.

== History ==
Guangyun Temple was first built in 1828 by the Yunnan government, in the Daoguang period (1821–1850) in the Qing dynasty (1644–1911), it is influenced by the architectural style of Han Chinese buildings and at the same time preserves the basic form of the Theravada Buddhist temples.

On January 13, 1988, the temple was listed among the "Major National Historical and Cultural Sites" by the State Council of China.

== Architecture ==
Guangyun Temple has three existing buildings, includes the main hall and two gates.

=== Main Hall ===
The main hall, 14.8 metres (49 ft) wide and 24.4 metres (80 ft) deep, is a circuit gallery-style (围廊式样) hall with a double eave pavilion (重檐亭阁) which is in front of the temple and forms the hall. The pillars before the door are engraved with two vivid wooden Chinese dragons in sore straits. The doors and windows of the main hall are carved with openwork patterns, which show proficient skills. Inner walls are painted with 10 frescos, mostly of which are colored after outlined by ink. The styles and techniques are similar with that in the central plain areas in the Ming (1368–1644) and Qing dynasties (1644–1911). Belonging to Han Chinese architectural styles, the buildings of paintings are double eaves hip and gable roof (重檐歇山顶) with human figures of officials, women, soldiers, attendants and others from different ethnic groups.

== See also ==
- List of Major National Historical and Cultural Sites in Yunnan
