= Shuanglong Bridge =

Shuanglong Bridge 双龙桥
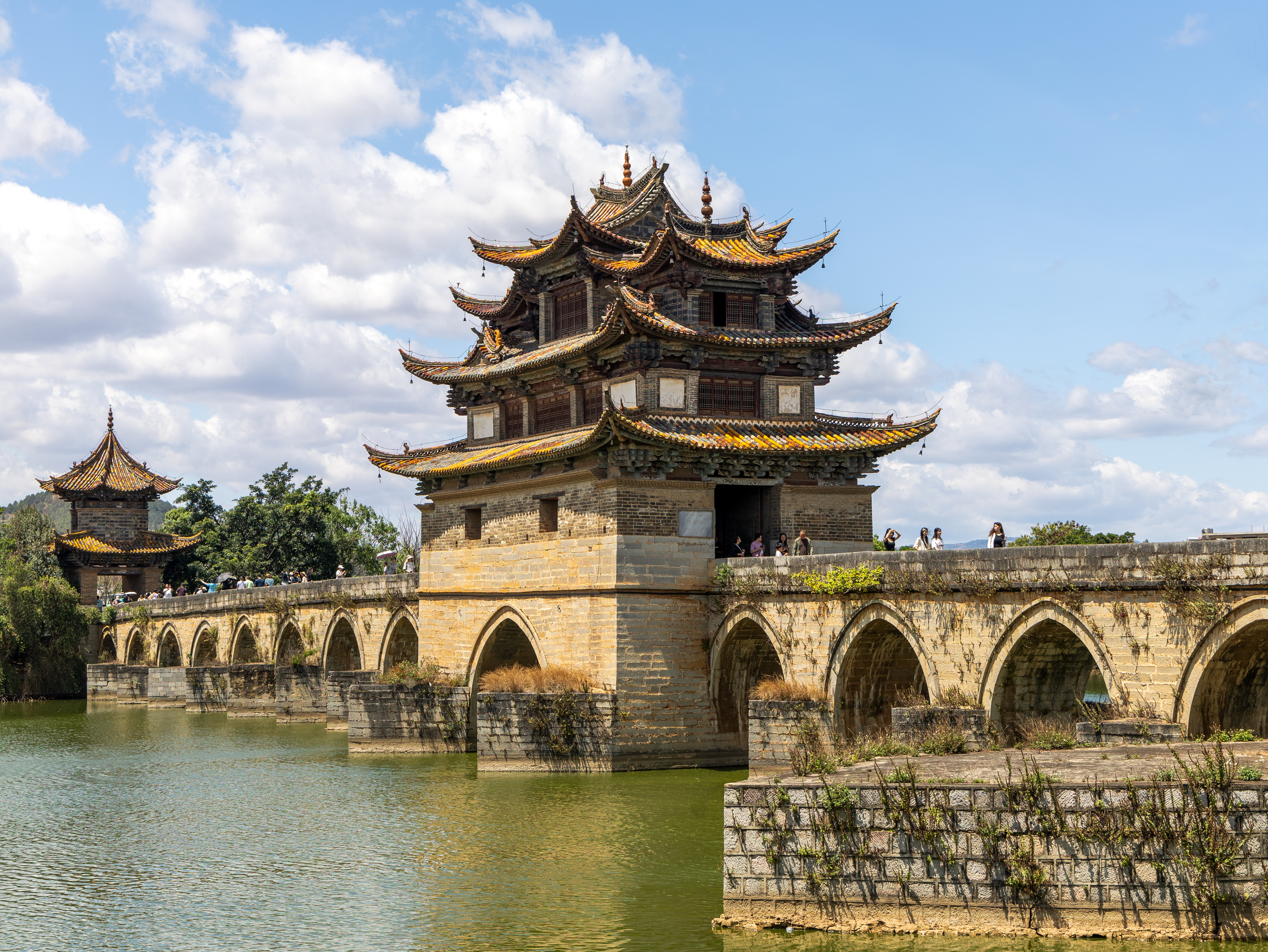
- Coordinates: 23°36′30″N 102°47′34″E
- Carries: pedestrian
- Crosses: Lujiang River and Tachong River
- Locale: Jianshui County, Yunnan, China
- Heritage status: Major Historical and Cultural Sites Protected at the National Level

Characteristics
- Design: Arch bridge
- Material: Stone
- Total length: 148.26 m
- Width: 3-5 m
- Height: 9 m
- No. of spans: 17
- Piers in water: 16

History
- Built: 1839

Location
- Interactive map of Shuanglong Bridge

Shuanglong Bridge
- Simplified Chinese: 双龙桥
- Traditional Chinese: 雙龍橋
Transcriptions
Standard Mandarin
- Hanyu Pinyin: Shuānglóng qiáo

Shuanglong Bridge (Chinese: 双龙桥, lit. 'Double Dragon Bridge'), commonly known as the Seventeen-Arch Bridge, is located in Xizhuang Town, Jianshui County, Honghe Hani and Yi Autonomous Prefecture, Yunnan, China. It is a large 17-arch stone bridge spanning the confluence of the Lujiang River and the Tachong River (塔冲河) and derives its name from the intersection of these two waters. It has been described as the largest and most artistically valuable ancient stone bridge in Yunnan. It holds an important place in the history of bridges in China, and is currently designated as a Major Historical and Cultural Sites Protected at the National Level.

== History ==
Shuanglong Bridge was originally built on Lujiang River during the reign of the Qianlong Emperor (1736–1796) as a three-arch stone bridge. Later, heavy rains and flash floods caused the Tachong River to burst its banks and shift its course, merging with the Lujiang River at this point, widening the river surface by three to four times. Local residents built wooden bridges across the river for passage, but these could not withstand the floods and were soon destroyed.

In 1839, local gentry proposed a project, and funded by the Gejiu tin industry, built a new fourteen stone arches to connect with the original three arches, forming a seventeen-arch bridge. Three Chinese pavilions were built on top of the bridge; the central one was a two-story pavilion known as the "Grand View of the West" (西望大觀), becoming a famous scenic spot of the time. In 1856, Ma Rulong from Jianshui responded to the Panthay Rebellion. During the ensuing warfare, the pavilions on the bridge were burned down, though the bridge itself remained intact.

In 1893, local gentry proposed that "all merchants doing business in Gejiu shall pay a percentage of their tin income." After four years of fundraising, reconstruction of the three pavilions began in 1896 and was completed in 1898. The project cost 5,000 taels of silver. The central pavilion was redesigned in a gate-tower style, making it grander than the previous one.

During the National Protection War in 1916, Long Tiqian (龍體乾), the son of the Guangdong Governor Long Jiguang (a native of Mengzi who supported Yuan Shikai), sneaked back to southern Yunnan. He allied with the Nalou Tusi chieftain (納樓土司) Pu Juntang (普鈞堂), landlords, and bandits to attack Jianshui. However, they were repelled by the brigade of Li Xiujia. The rebel forces burned down the northern bridge pavilion while fleeing.

In 1965, bridge expert Mao Yisheng listed Shuanglong Bridge as one of the large-scale ancient bridges in China. Consequently, it was designated as one of the first batch of Major Provincial Historical and Cultural Sites of Yunnan. In May 2006, the State Council announced it as a Major Historical and Cultural Sites Protected at the National Level (the sixth batch).

Shuanglong Bridge was once a vital local traffic route, serving 5,000 people from five nearby villages. During the rainy season when the river rose, hundreds of motor vehicles passed over the bridge daily. Most were overloaded agricultural vehicles and tractors, causing a certain degree of damage to the ancient bridge. In 2008, the local government undertook emergency reinforcement measures, building protective walls at the bridge entrances to prevent motor vehicles from crossing. Subsequently, protective projects such as bridge maintenance, the construction of an alternative bridge, and village relocation were implemented. By 2020, the Shuanglong Bridge Wetland Park was completed.

== Architecture ==
The deck of Shuanglong Bridge is flat, and the body is constructed from approximately 500 stone blocks. It is 9 meters high and has a total length of 148.26 meters. The original three-arch section is 5 meters wide, while the later fourteen-arch section is 3 meters wide. There are solid stone railings on both sides of the deck, 90 centimeters high and 35 centimeters thick. Mao Yisheng classified Shuanglong Bridge as a "multi-arch bridge with thick piers". Due to the phased expansion, the arch spans vary. There are 13 arches with a net span of 4.63 meters, 2 arches with 5.8 meters, and 1 arch with 6.5 meters. The arc radii are 2.7 meters, 3.1 meters, and 3.25 meters respectively. The bridge opening beneath the central pavilion is a semi-circular arch with a span of 6.17 meters. The keystones are 40 centimeters thick.

At the center of the bridge stands a three-story wooden pavilion with double-eaved hip-and-gable roof featuring 47 ridges. It has a side length of 16 meters and a height of 20 meters, covered with yellow glazed tiles. The ground floor serves as the bridge passage, while the top floor features a small hall with three bays. The top eaves are divided into three small hip-and-gable roofs.

On the south side of the bridge, there is a two-story, wooden, double-eaved octagonal pavilion with a tented roof, standing 13 meters high.

== Commemoration ==
Ancient architecture expert Luo Zhewen has a poem to praised the bridge.

On March 29, 2003, the State Post Bureau issued a set of four stamps titled "Ancient Bridges of China — Arch Bridges" (Serial No. 2003-5T). The fourth stamp, with a face value of 80 cents, features Shuanglong Bridge.

== Gallery ==
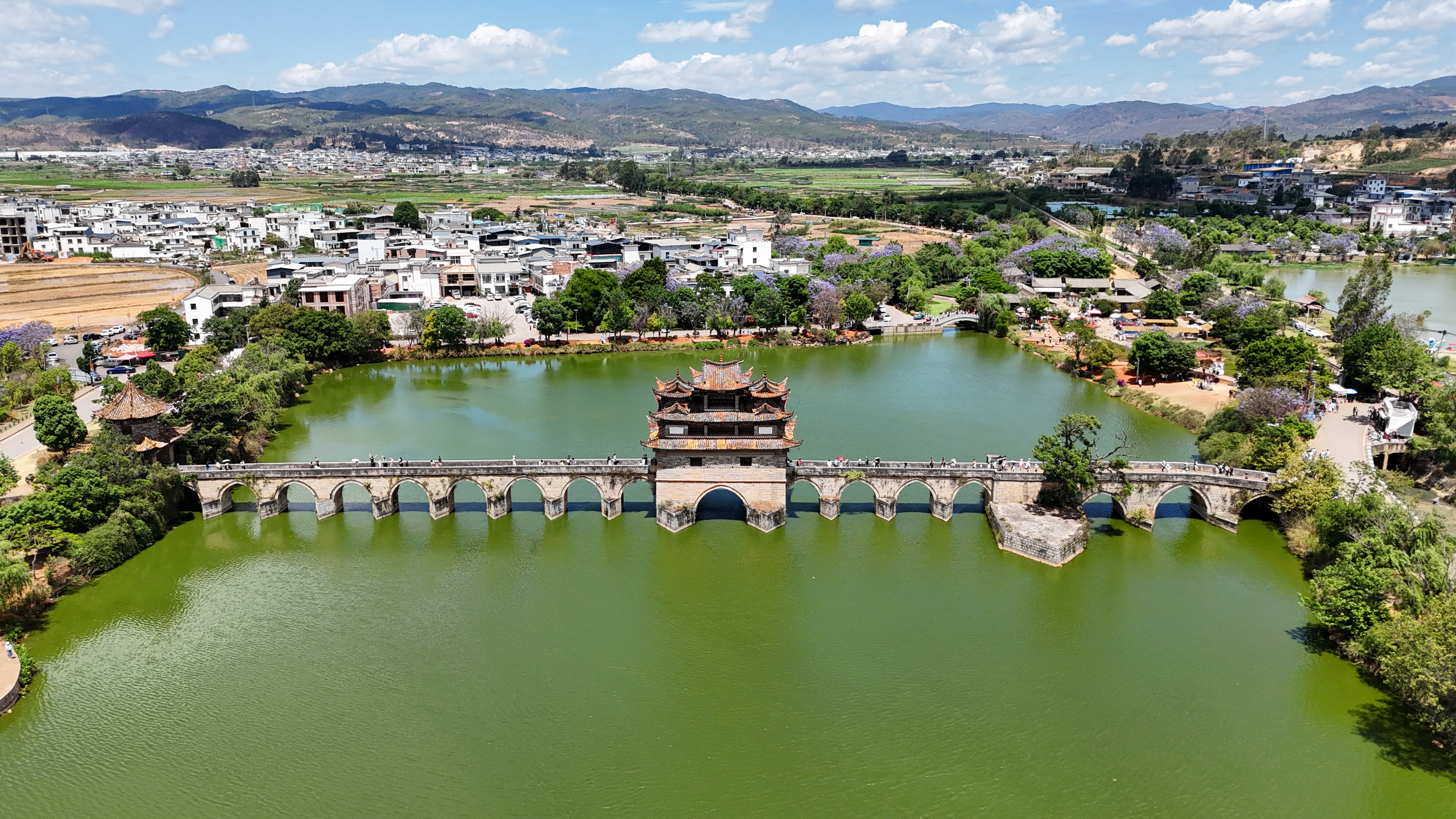
Aerial view

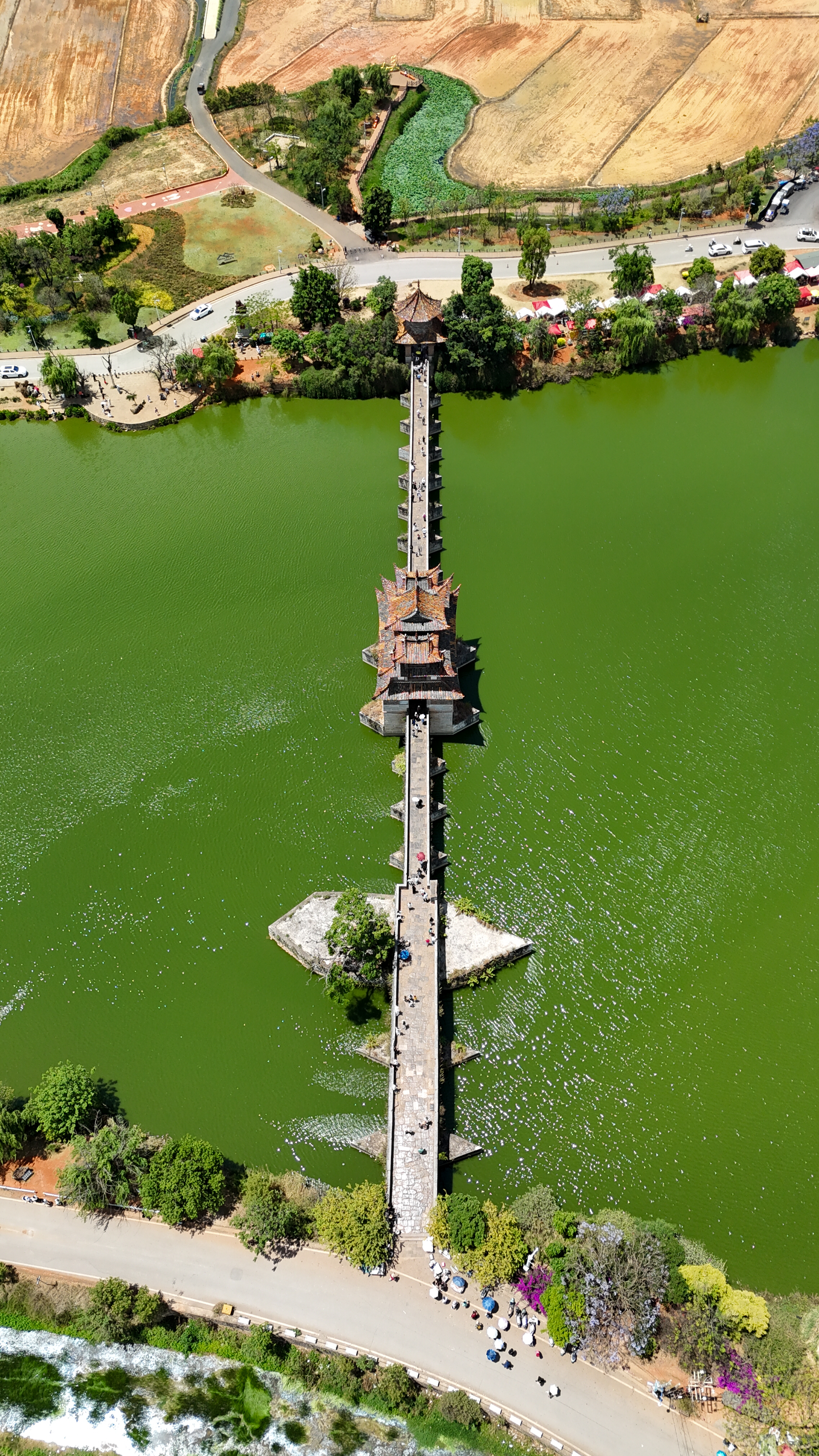
Aerial view

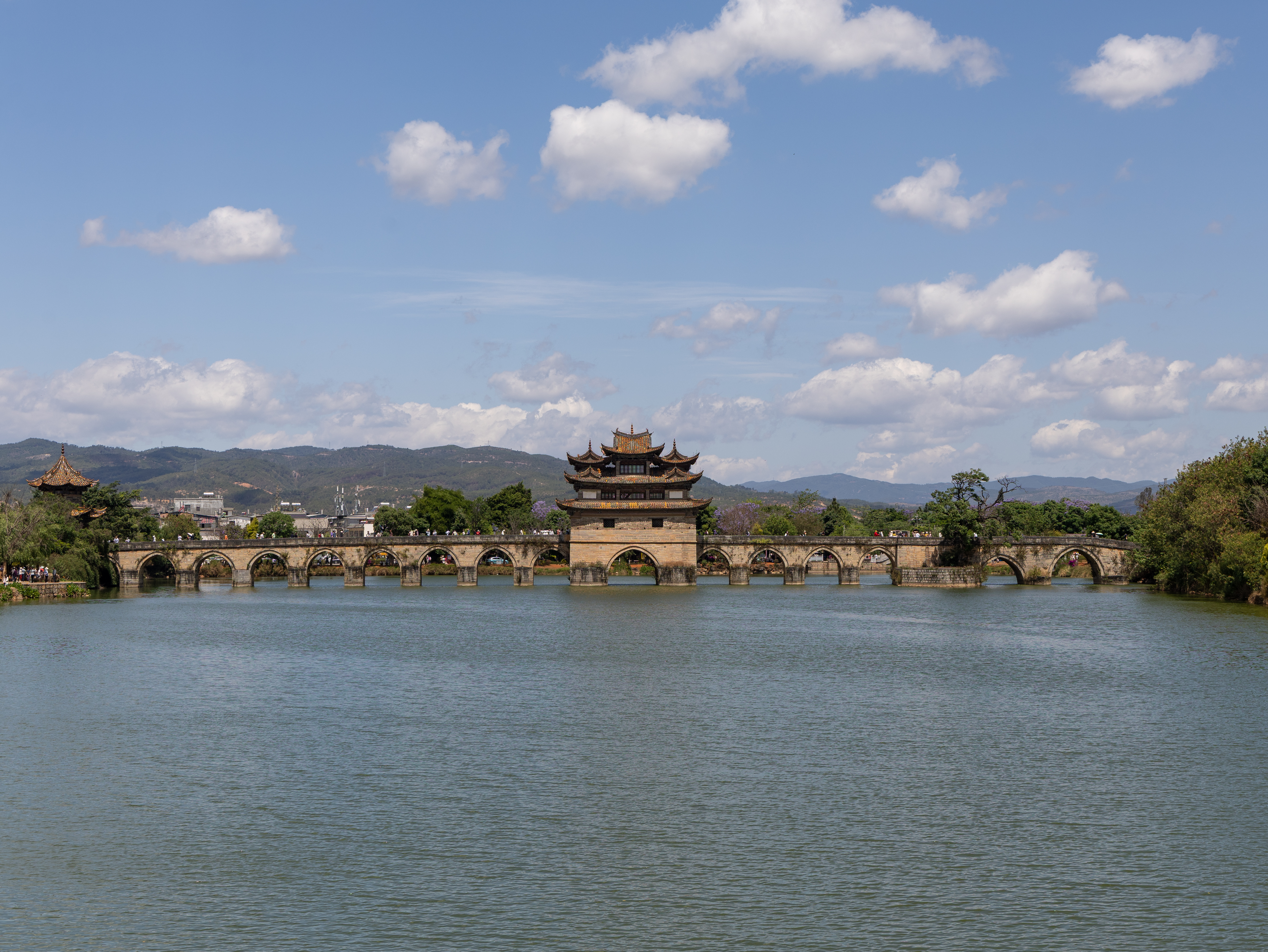
Panoramic

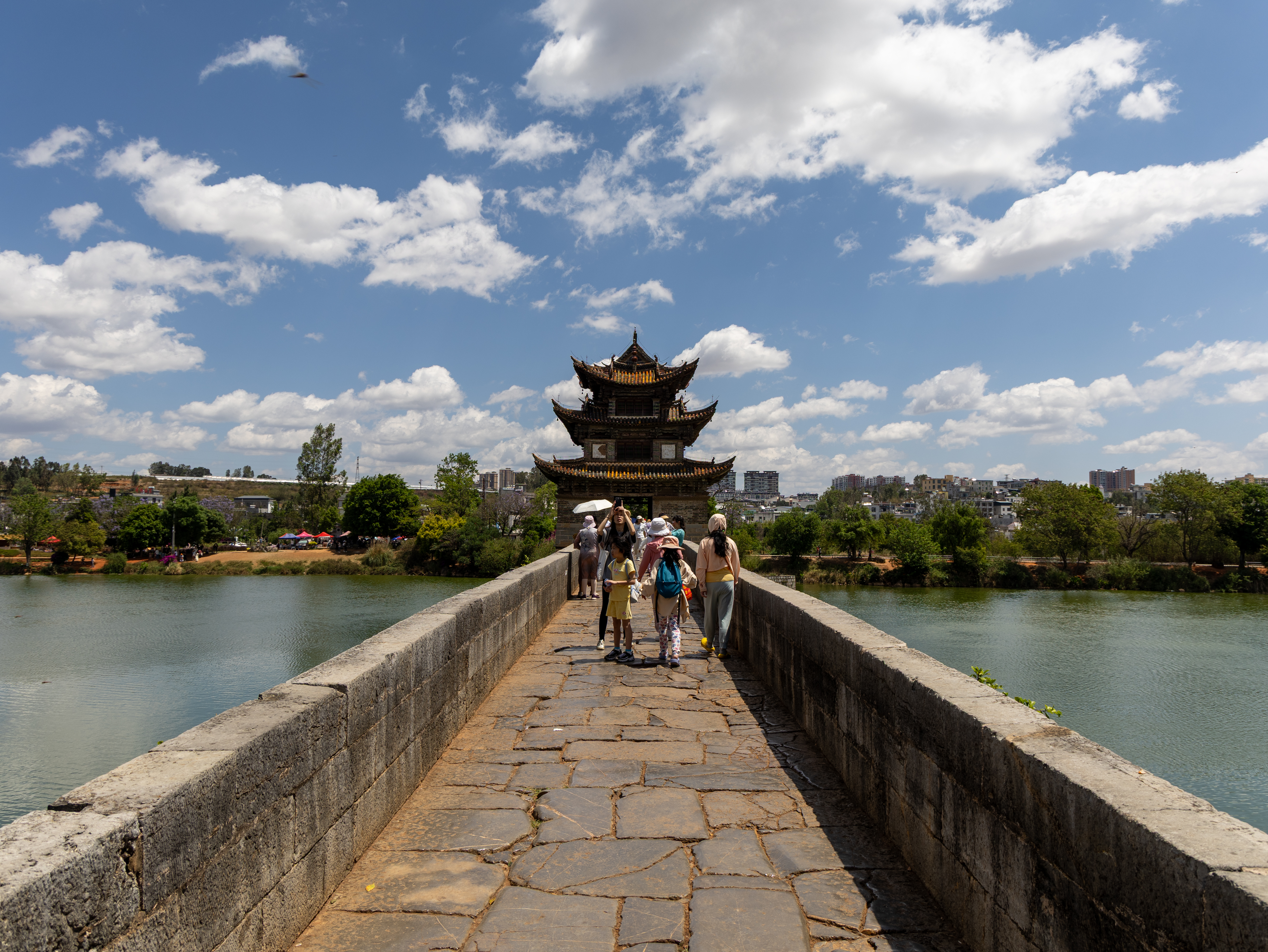
Bridge deck

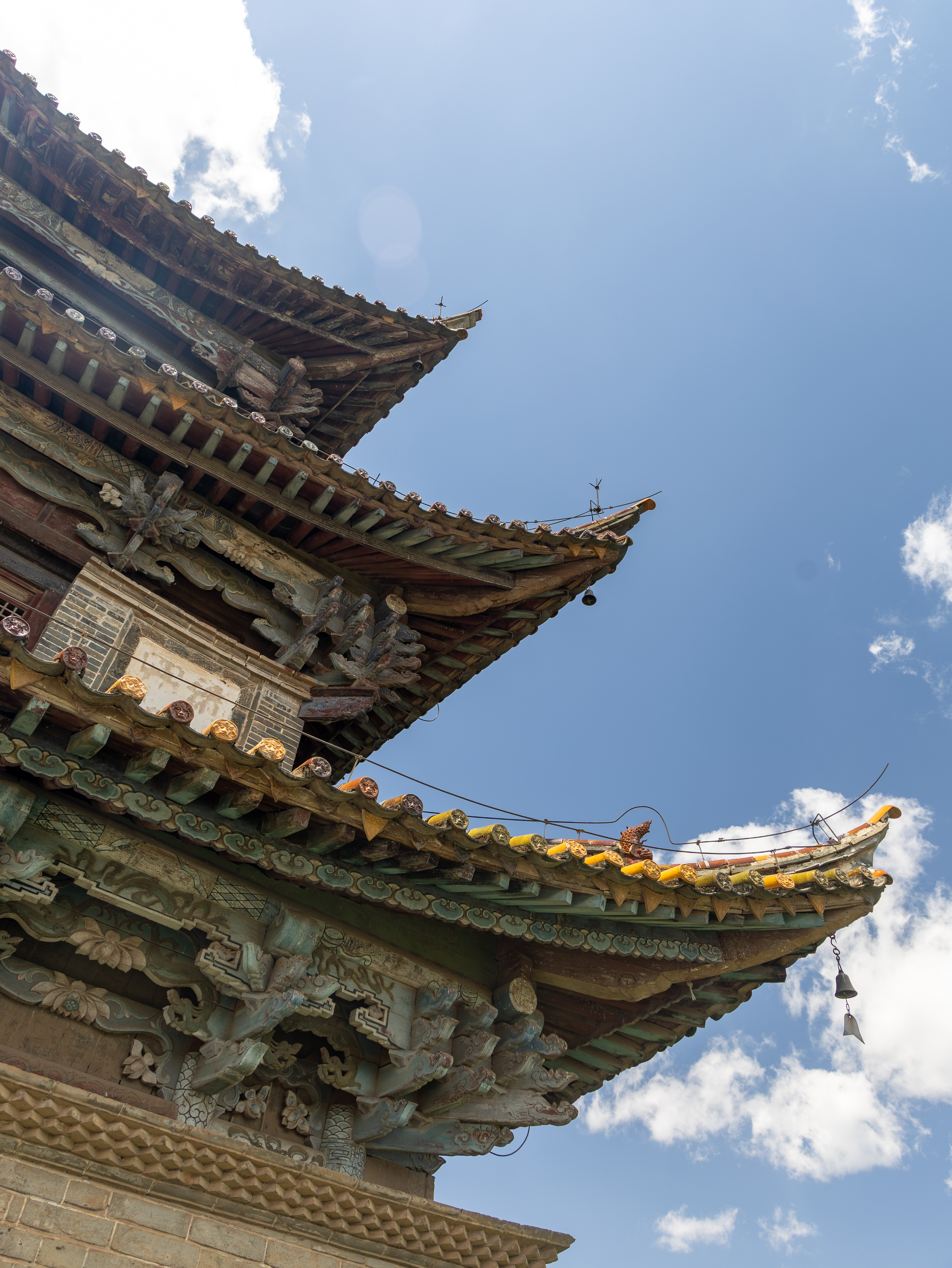
Dougong of the main pavilion

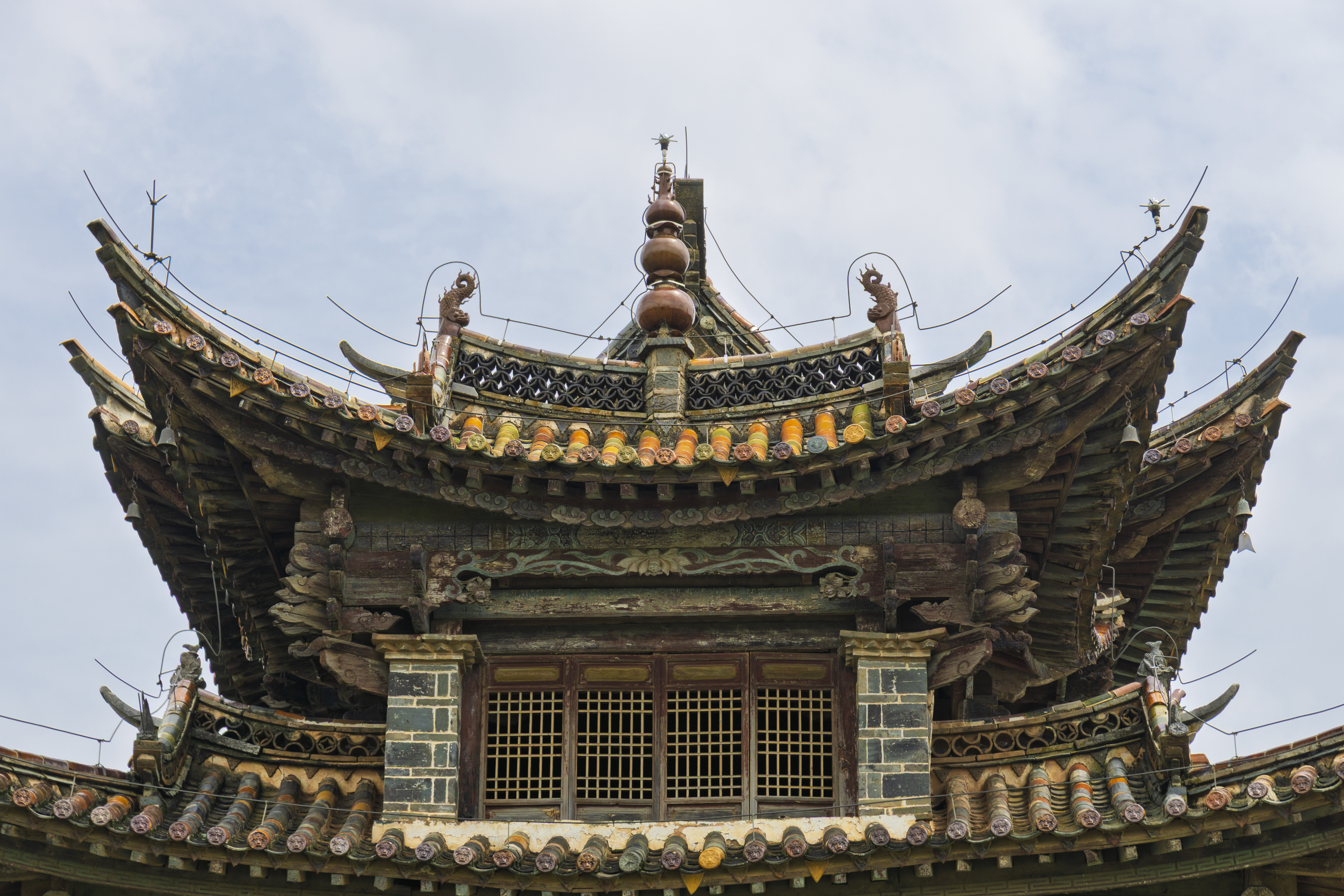
Top of the main pavilion

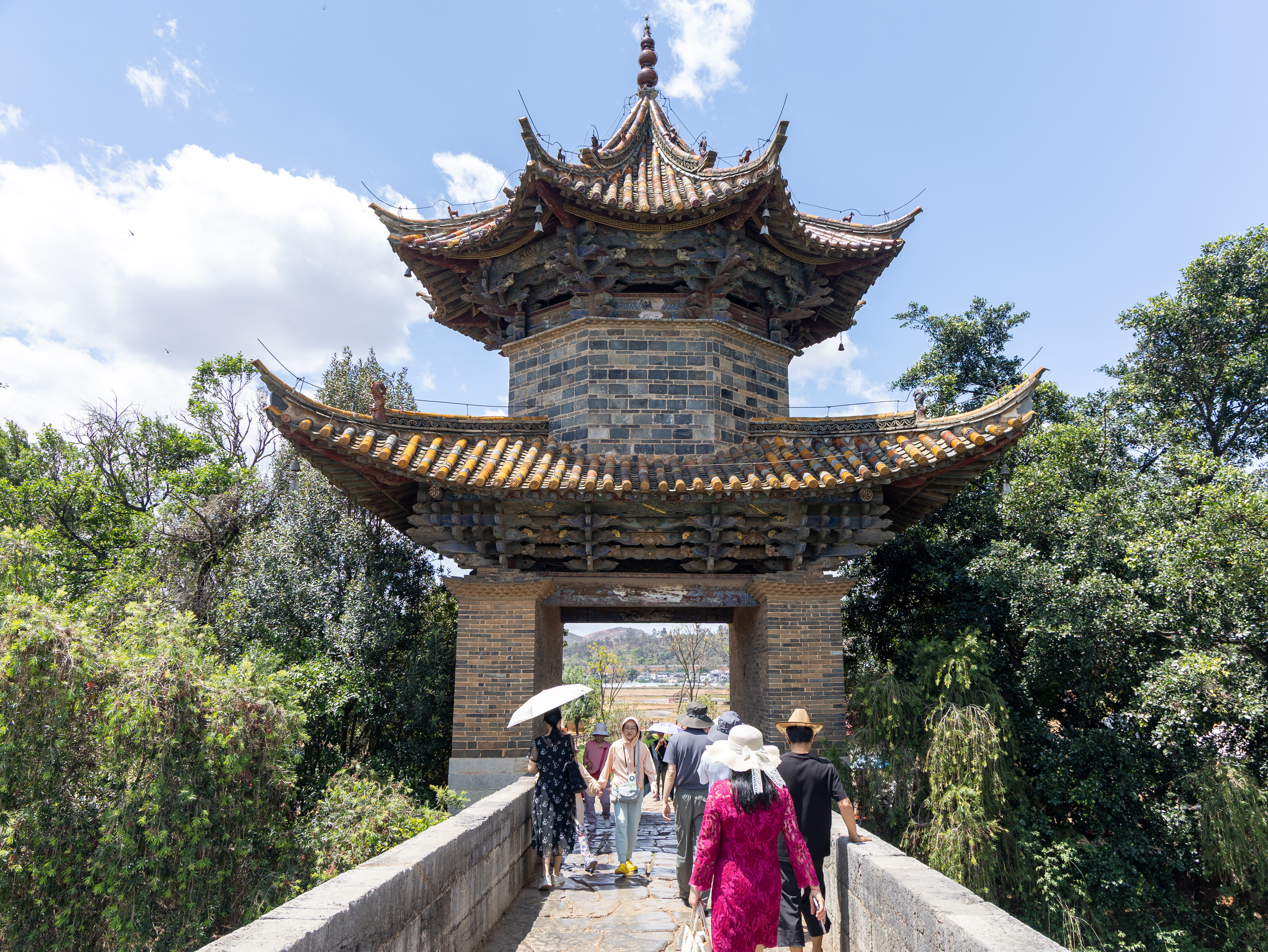
South pavilion

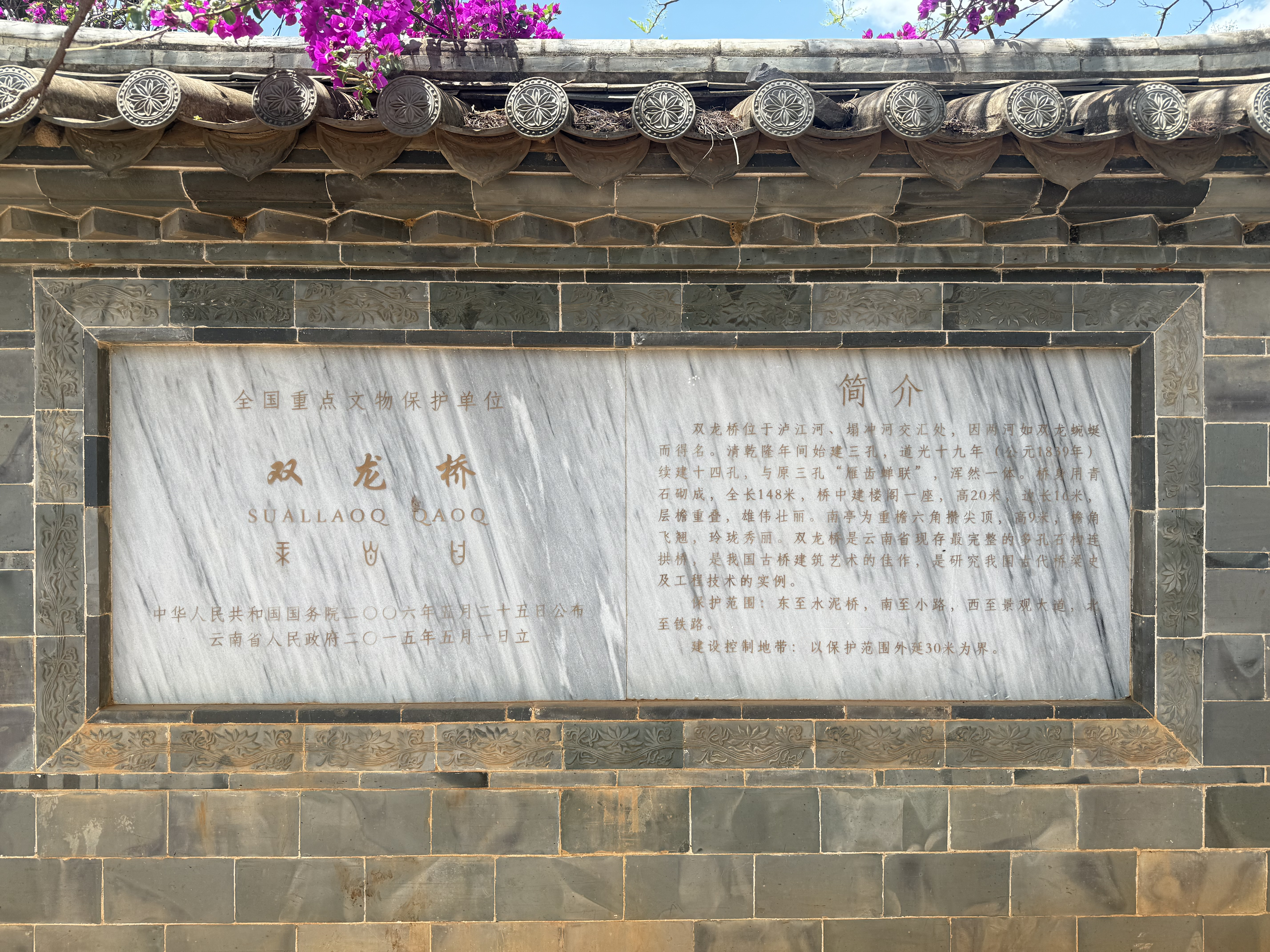
Sign of the Major Historical and Cultural Site

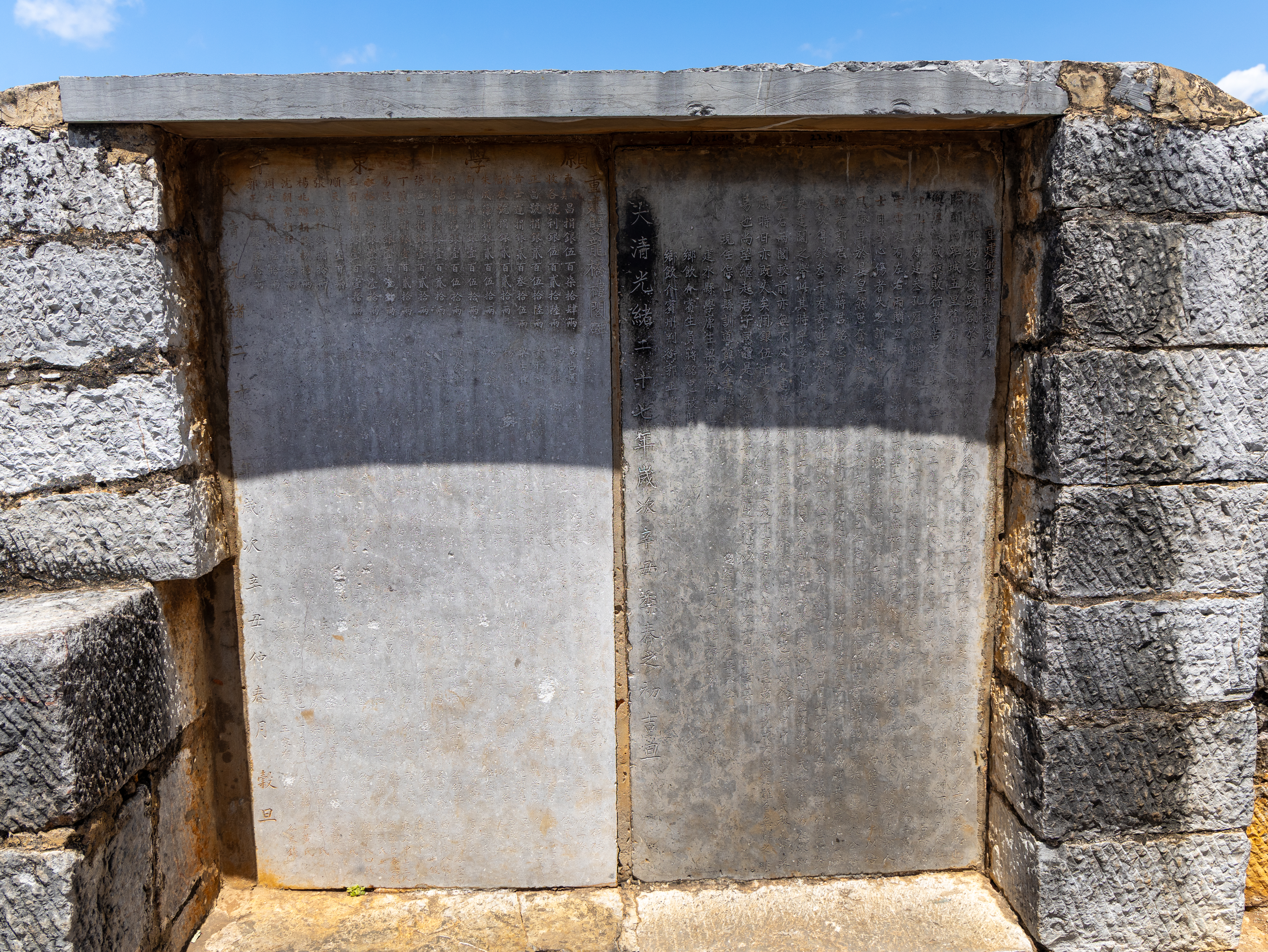
Inscription of The Preface of Reconstruction of Shuanglong Bridge Pavilion
