= Monument to the National Unity Oath =

Coordinates: 23°04′06″N 101°02′36″E

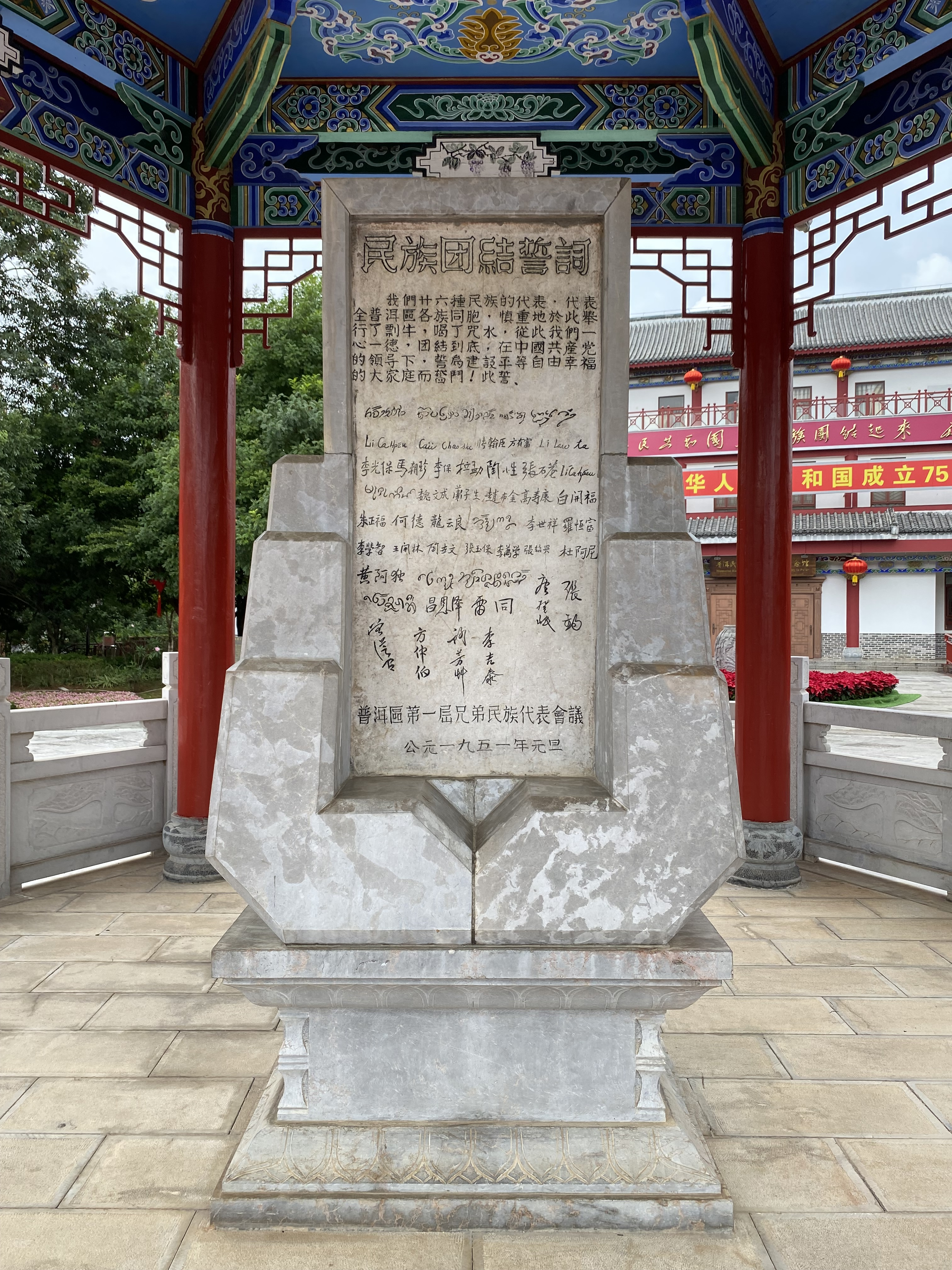
Monument to the National Unity Oath

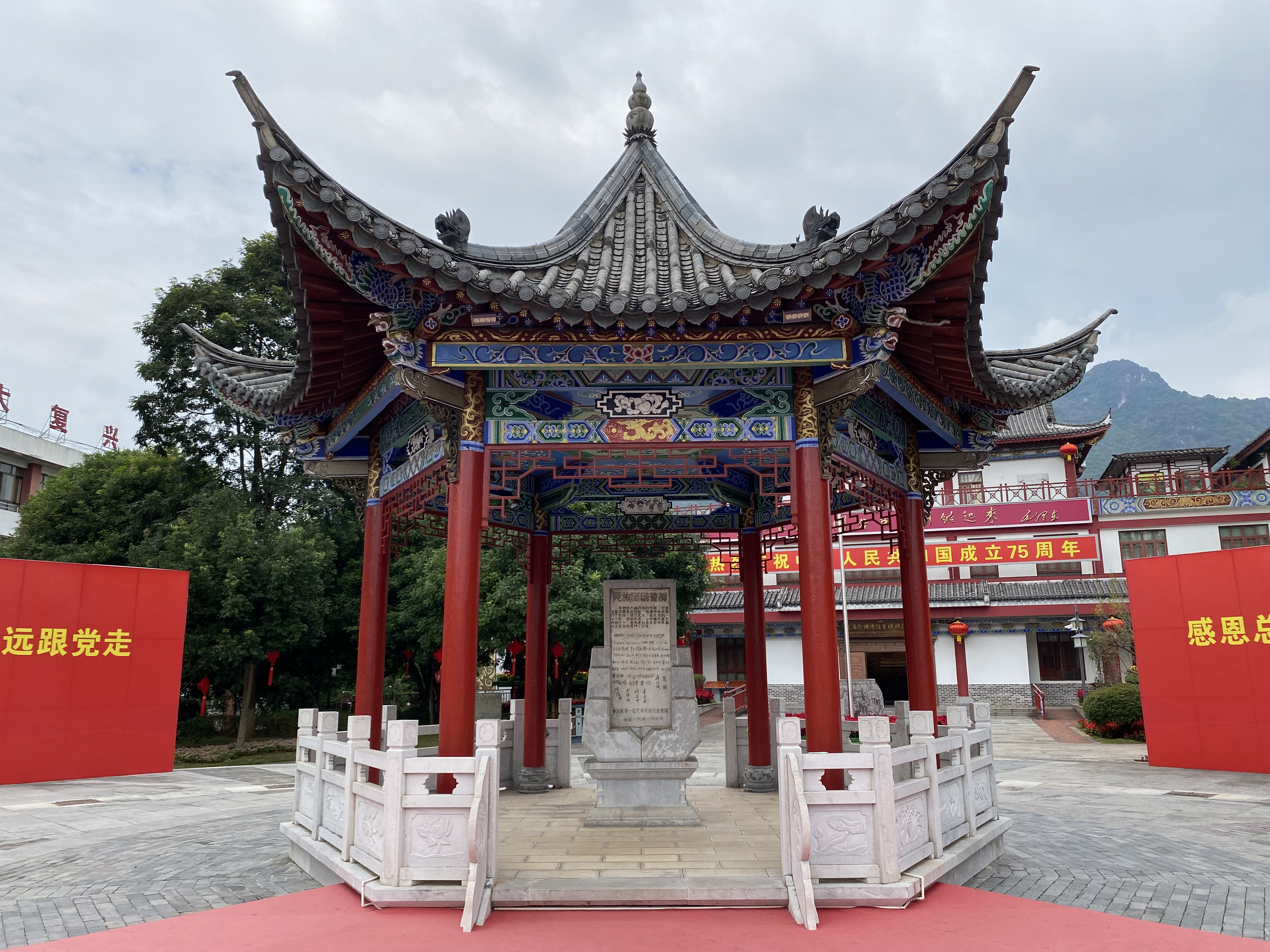
The monument pavilion

The Monument to the National Unity Oath, which is situated in Ning'er Hani and Yi Autonomous County, Pu'er City, Yunnan Province, China, is one of the national critical cultural relics protection units. After a traditional Wa oath-taking ceremony to promote national unity in Ning'er Hani and Yi Autonomous County (formerly known as Pu'er Hani and Yi Autonomous County), the monument was erected on January 1, 1951 (or December 26, 1950). The monument was initially situated in the Red Field of Pu'er; however, it was abandoned once time. It was initially housed in the Cultural Center of Ning'er Hani and Yi Autonomous County (or the County Government Courtyard) after its recovery. Subsequently, in 2000, it was relocated to the "National Unity Garden" on the northern side of Ning'er county town. The Monument to the National Unity Oath was referred to as "the first monument of national unity in new China" and "the first monument of national work in new China." It was included in the fourth group of Yunnan Provincial Cultural Relics Protection in November 1993 and the sixth batch of Major cultural heritage sites under national-level protection in May 2006.

== History ==
=== The rationale and method of construction ===
Ning'er Hani and Yi Autonomous County of Pu'er City, Yunnan Province (then known as Pu'er Hani and Yi Autonomous County) was home to 26 ethnic groups, including Hani, Lahu, Dai, Wa, Yao, Jino, and Bulang, at the inception of the People's Republic of China. In September 1950, members of the local ethnic groups sent their members to join the Yunnan Provincial People's Liberation Army due to economic and cultural disparities that resulted in feuds and murders. These conflicts were also the subject of interference from other forces. The significance of ethnic unity was subsequently recognized by the local ethnic groups, who dispatched members to attend the National Day ceremony of the People's Republic of China. On the day following the representatives of the various ethnic groups returned home from Beijing, the autonomous county convened the first meeting of the fraternal ethnic groups. During the meeting, the Wa representative, La Meng, proposed an alliance as a symbol of unity. Lei Tong, a poet from the Chinese League of Left-Wing Writers, composed the oath on the monument under the arrangement of Zhang Huajun, secretary of the Chinese Communist Party (CCP) Simao Regional Committee. Ultimately, it was determined to erect a monument to the national unity oath in the area.

Using the traditional Wa signing ceremony of plagiarizing a cow (after killing a cow, one observes the direction of the cow's body to determine whether it is lucky or unlucky, and then decides whether or not to take the oath), the oath-taking ceremony was held on the red field in Pu'er, Yunnan Province, on January 1, 1951 (or December 26, 1950). The party, government, and military leaders of the Simao Regional Committee delivered speeches and administered the oath during the ceremony. Subsequently, they slaughtered a rooster and drained its blood into wine. The party, government, and military leaders, as well as representatives of the various ethnic groups, alternated in consuming the chicken blood wine. La Meng, the Wa representative who proposed the alliance, plagiarized a bull under the sound of wooden drums after drinking the chicken blood wine. He killed the bull while reciting incantations and holding the plagiarism gun tightly in both hands, resulting in a symbol of good luck. The people at the scene then cheered, and the 42 representatives of the ethnic groups drank the incantation water mixed with cool boiled water, chicken blood, and wine. They signed a red piece of paper on the rostrum, and subsequently carved stones and erected a monument on the Red Square in Pu'er. Known as "the first monument of national unity in new China" and "the first monument of national work in new China," the Monument of National Unity Pledge is the first monument of its kind built after the establishment of the People's Republic of China.

=== Protection and use ===
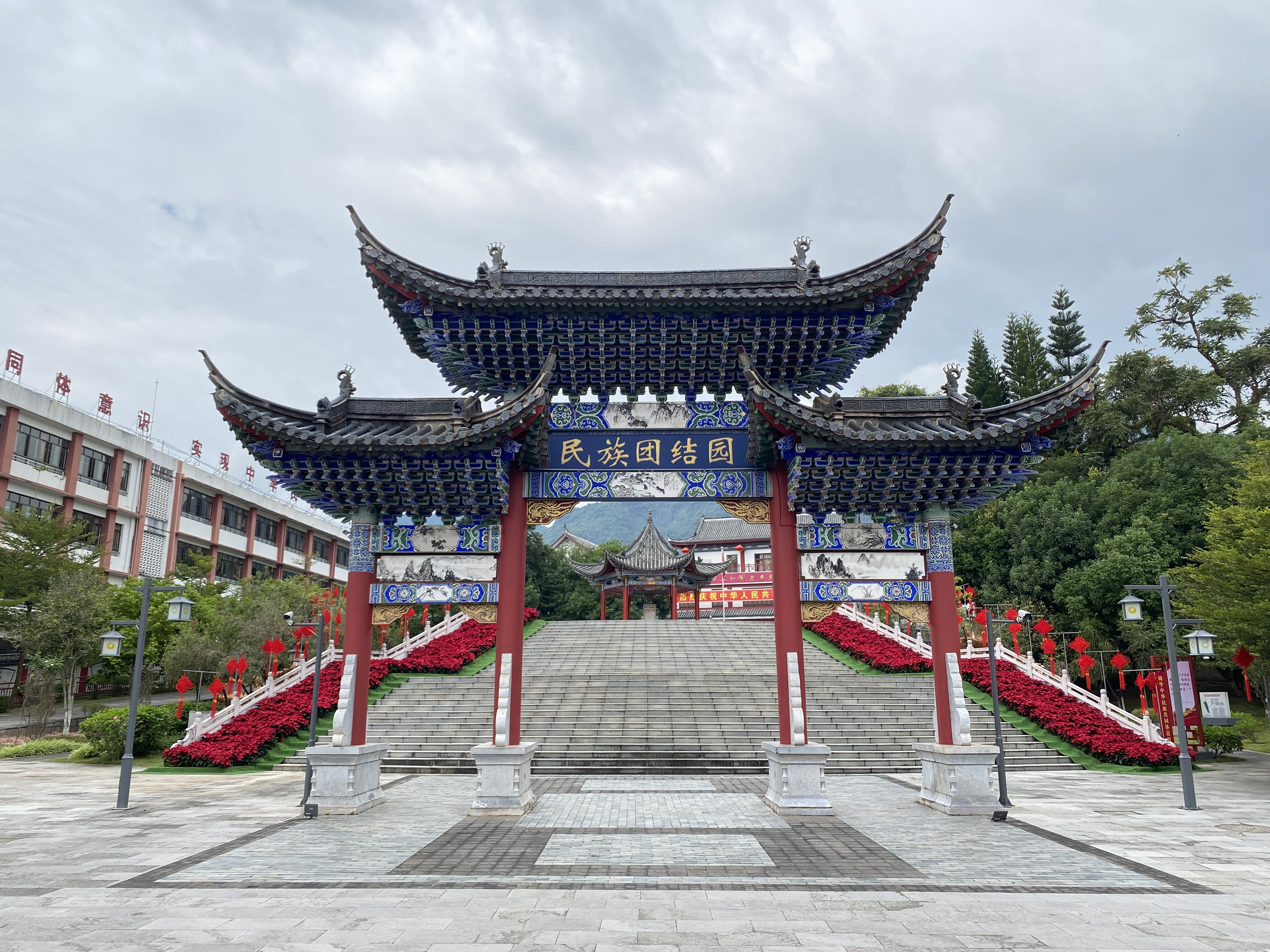
National Unity Garden

For an extended period, the monument was misplaced. Subsequently, the monument was temporarily lost. In March 1986, the local county government designated the oath monument as a county-level cultural relics protection unit. In 1989, the monument was recovered and relocated to the Cultural Hall of Ning'er Hani and Yi Autonomous County for the purpose of preservation. In 1991, the Simao Regional Committee and the Simao Regional Office celebrated the 40th anniversary of the monument by declaring January 1 of each year as "Pu'er National Unity Promotion Day." The National Unity Monument was designated as a Yunnan Provincial Cultural Relics Protection Unit on November 16, 1993. The Monument to the National Unity Oath was designated as a cultural relics protection entity in Yunnan Province on November 16, 1993.

In the late 1990s, Wang Haoying, who was then the director of the Ethnic and Religious Affairs Bureau of the Pu'er Hani and Yi Autonomous County, intended to utilize the Monument of the Pledge of National Unity as a focal point for the promotion of national unity and to establish a patriotic education foundation. In 1999, she proposed that the Monument of the Pledge of National Unity be relocated to Zhongshan Park on the north side of the city of Ning'er, and that a Garden of National Unity be established there. She collected historical materials on the Monument of the Pledge of National Unity to achieve this goal. The county party committee and government placed great importance on this proposal. in the year 2000, the Pu'er Hani and Yi Autonomous County allocated 10 acres of land for the construction of the Garden of National Unity in 2000. The monument to the Pledge of Allegiance was incorporated into a pavilion within the garden.

The Monument of Pledge of National Unity was designated as a patriotic education base in Yunnan Province in 2000. Subsequently, it was included in the Sixth Batch of National Key Cultural Relics Protection Units and National Education Base for Progress of National Unity in May and July 2006.

The National Unity Park, where the Monument is located, was visited by an average of nearly 10,000 individuals between 2001 and 2011, as per the data of the Ning'er County Committee of the CCP. Additionally, numerous young individuals in Yunnan conduct the ceremony of joining the Young Pioneers of China or the Communist Youth League of China in front of the monument.

== Structure and appearance ==
The Ning'er National Unity Park is home to the 4,435-square-meter National Unity Monument, which is situated in a classical hexagonal pavilion. The monument is supported by a stone Sumeru seat in the shape of a two-handed arch. The park also features a classical gate in the form of a pagoda, bas-relief sculptures, the main building, and a museum of the monument's literature and history. The construction materials for the oath monument are rectangular white limestone, with a monument body that is 1.42 meters in length, 0.66 meters in width, and 0.12 meters in thickness. The monument is engraved horizontally across the Chinese language, with the first monument imitating the Song Dynasty and the body of the text using the Regular Script. Some of the participants in the oath of signatures use the Dai or Lahu.
