= Jingzhen Octagonal Pavilion =

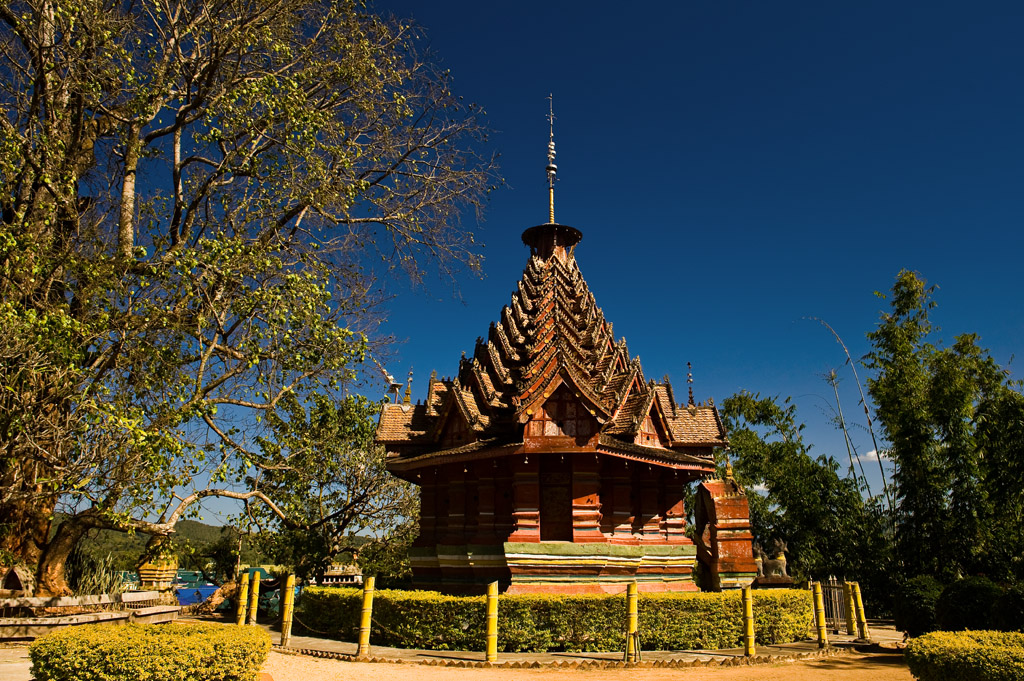
- Jingzhen Octagonal Pavilion
- Interactive map of the Jingzhen Octagonal Pavilion area

General information
- Type: Buddhist building
- Location: 20km away at Jingzhen, Xishuangbanna, China
- Coordinates: 21.9575°N 100.30377°E

Jingzhen Octagonal Pavilion (Chinese: 景真八角亭) is a pavilion located in Jingzhen Village, Mengzhe Township, Menghai County, Xishuangbanna Dai Autonomous Prefecture, Yunnan Province. It is 15.42 meters high and 8.6 meters wide, and consists of three parts, the seat, the body, and the top.

== History ==
Jingzhen Octagonal Pavilion was built in 1701 to quell an angry horde of wasps. After the completion of the pavilion, it was destroyed several times. In 1978, it was carefully repaired. The pavilion is a Dai Buddhist building.

Jingzhen Octagonal Pavilion was listed in the third batch of Major Historical and Cultural Site Protected at the National Level by the Chinese State Council in 1988.
