= Jianshui County =

Jianshui County 建水县 Lin'an (临安)
- County
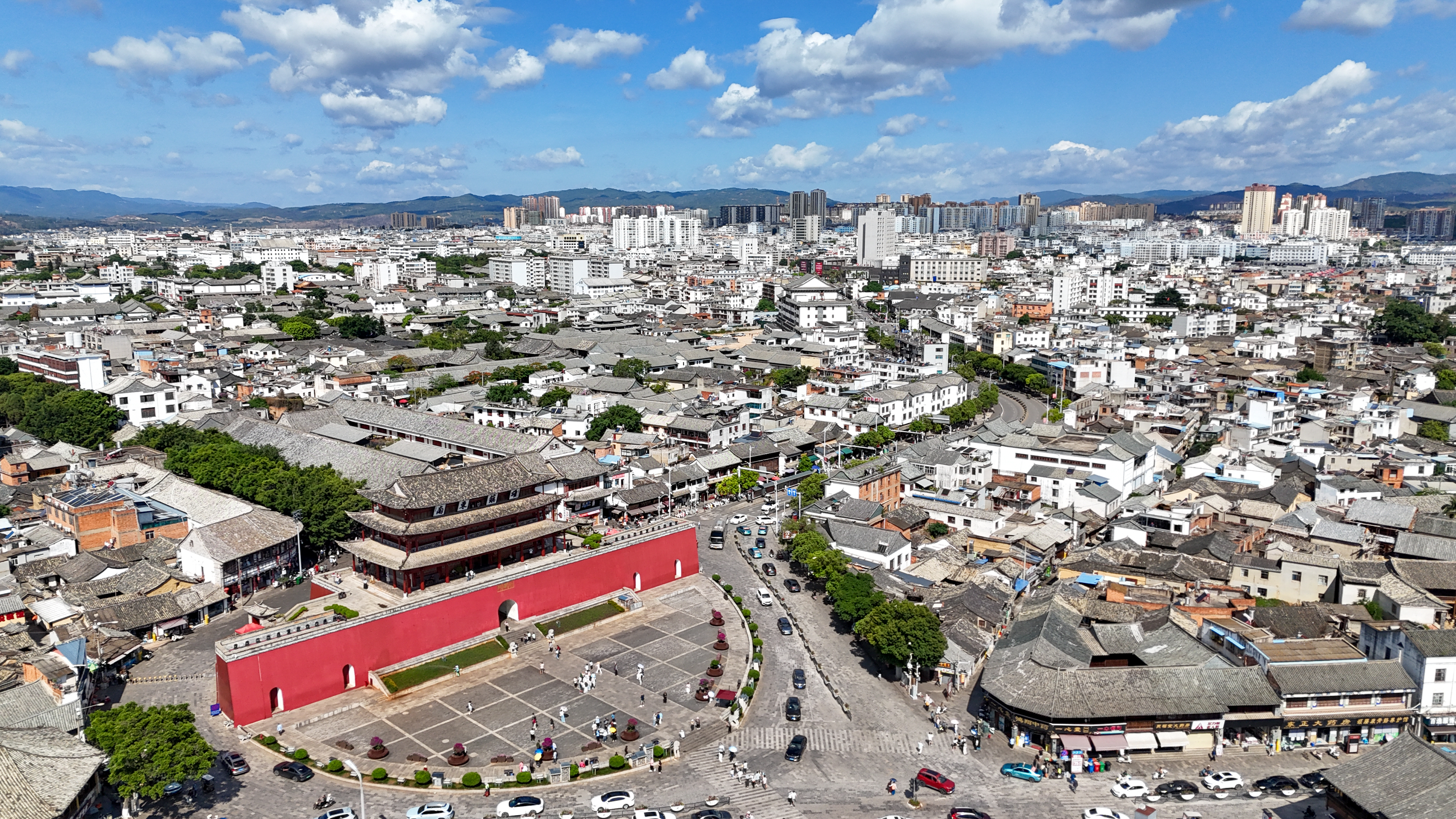
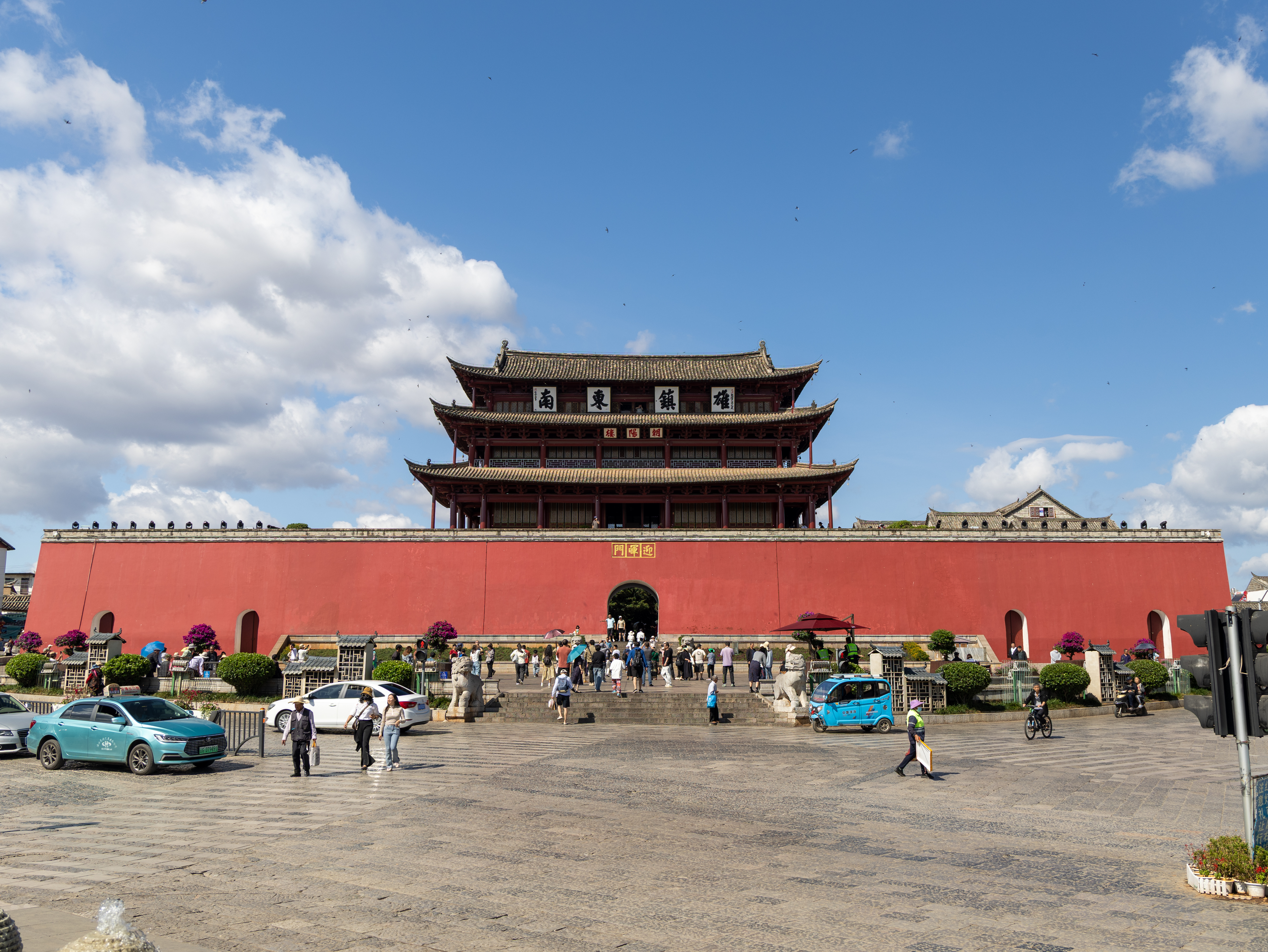
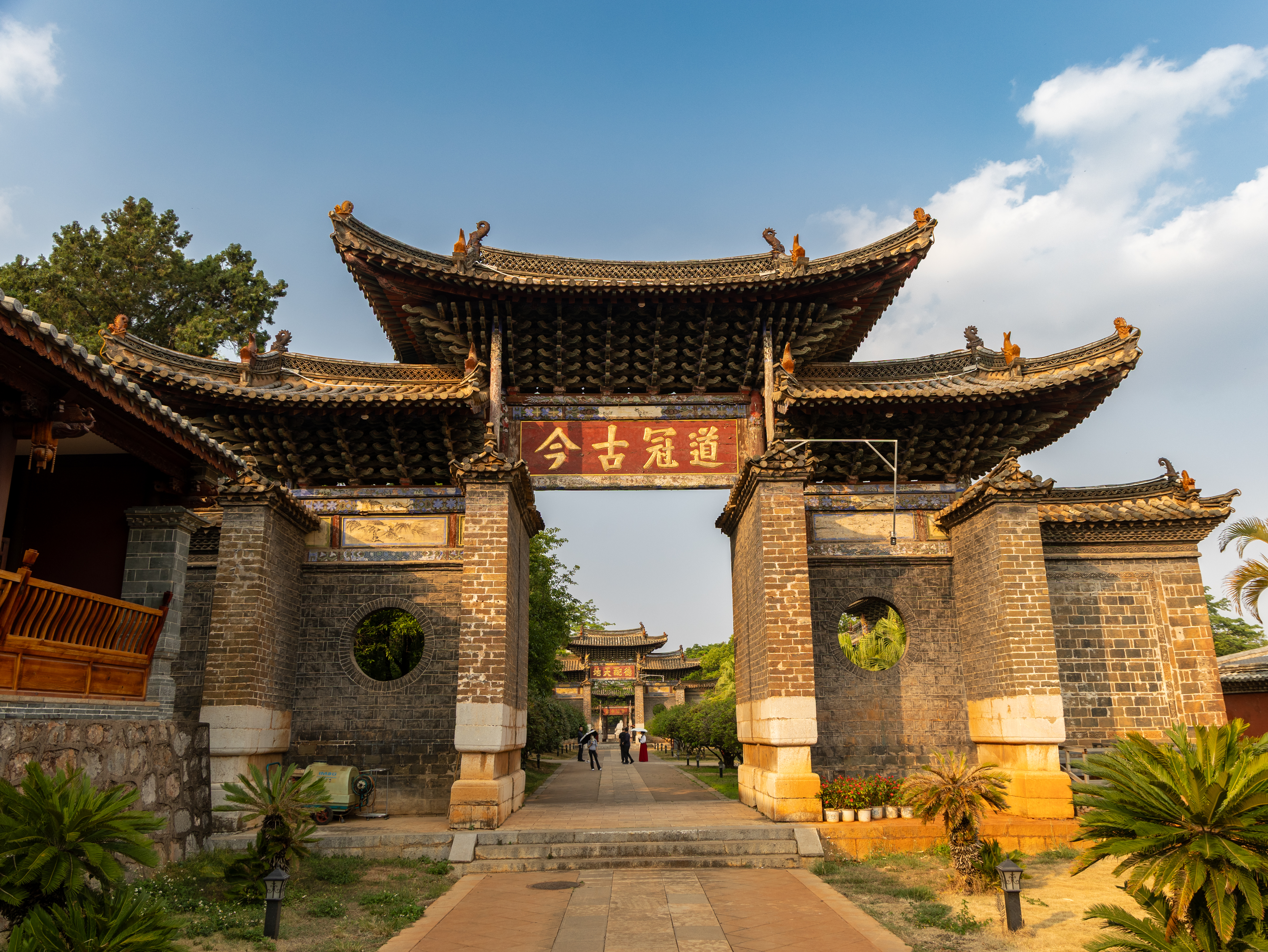
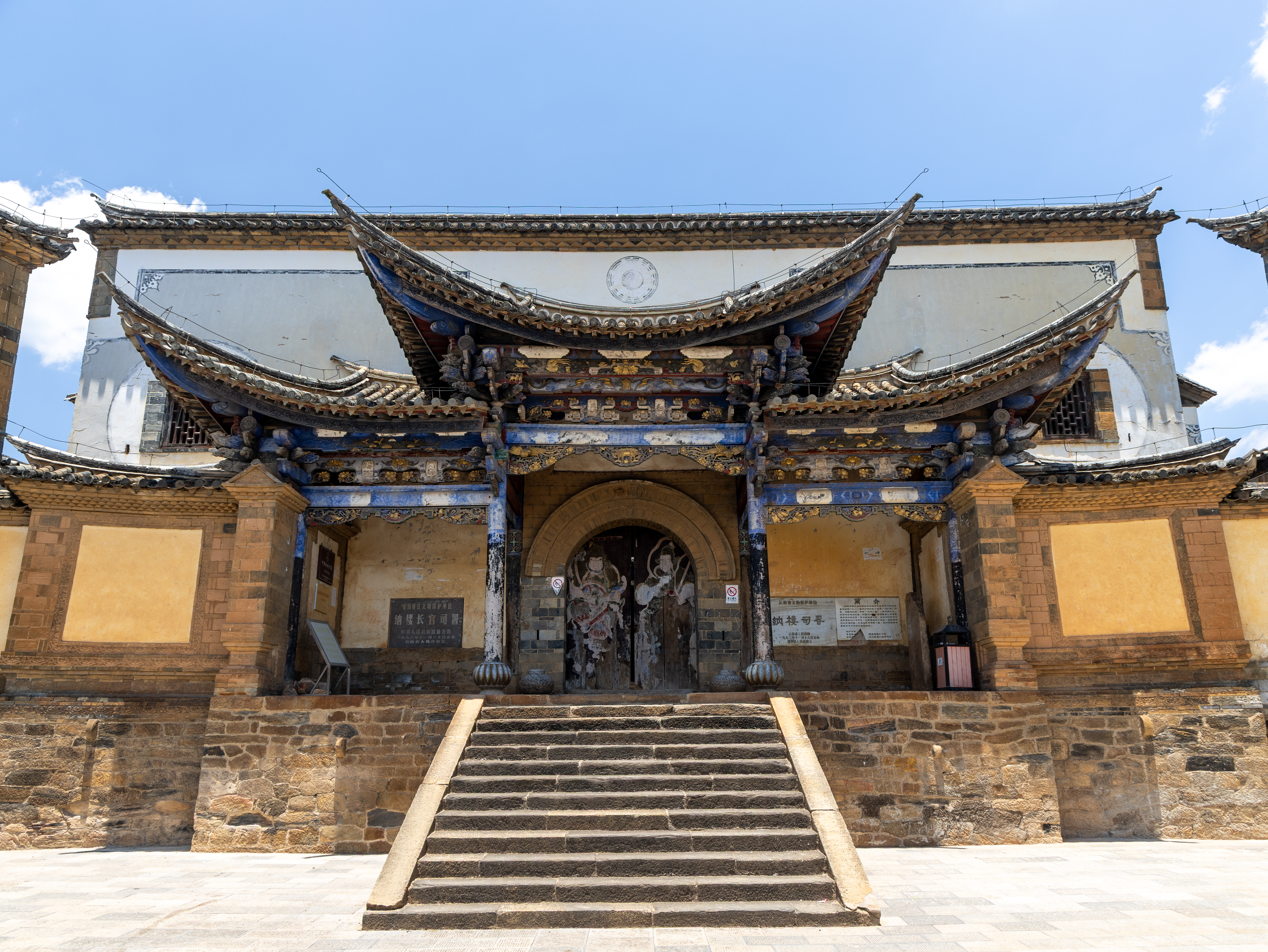
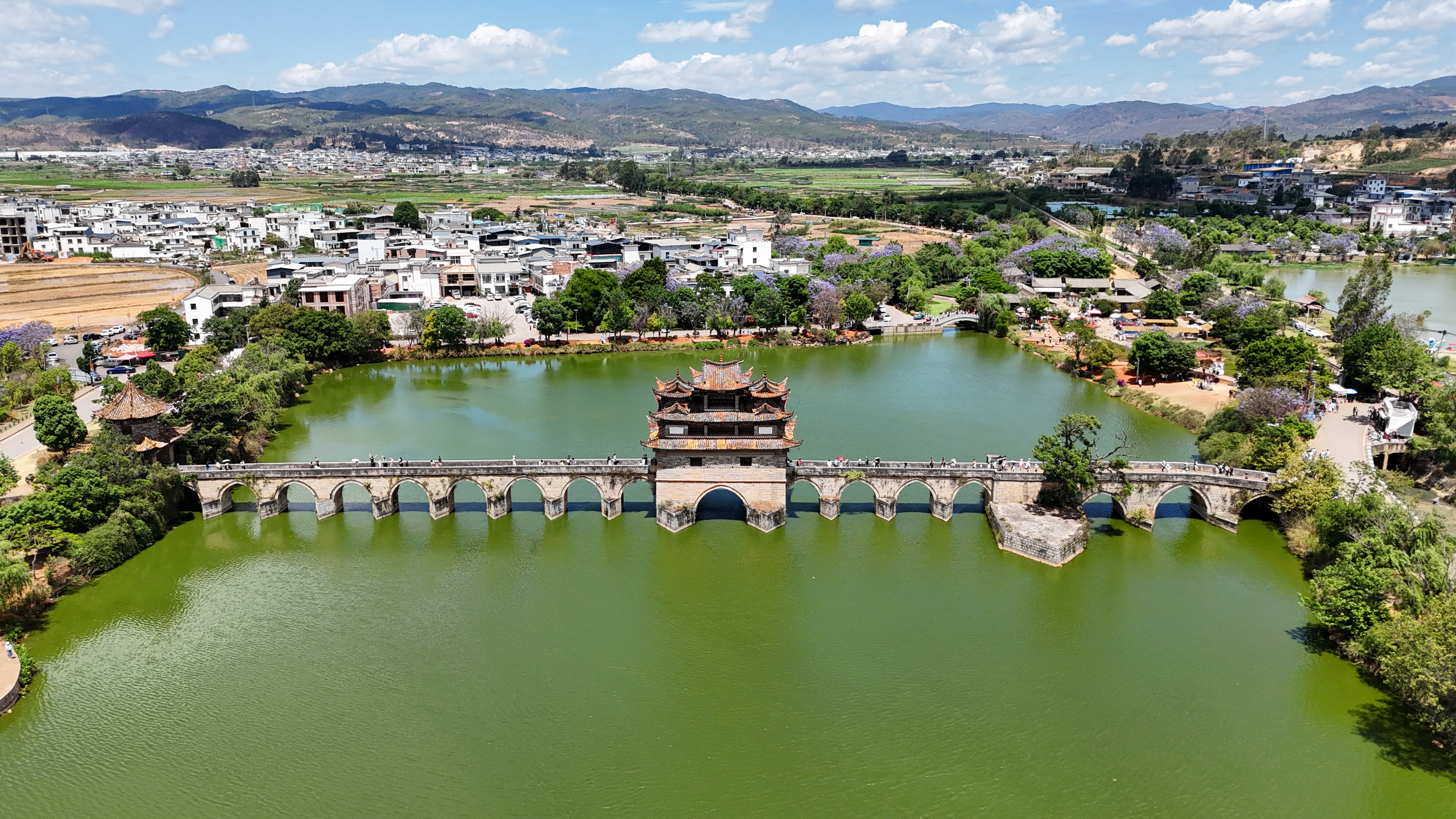
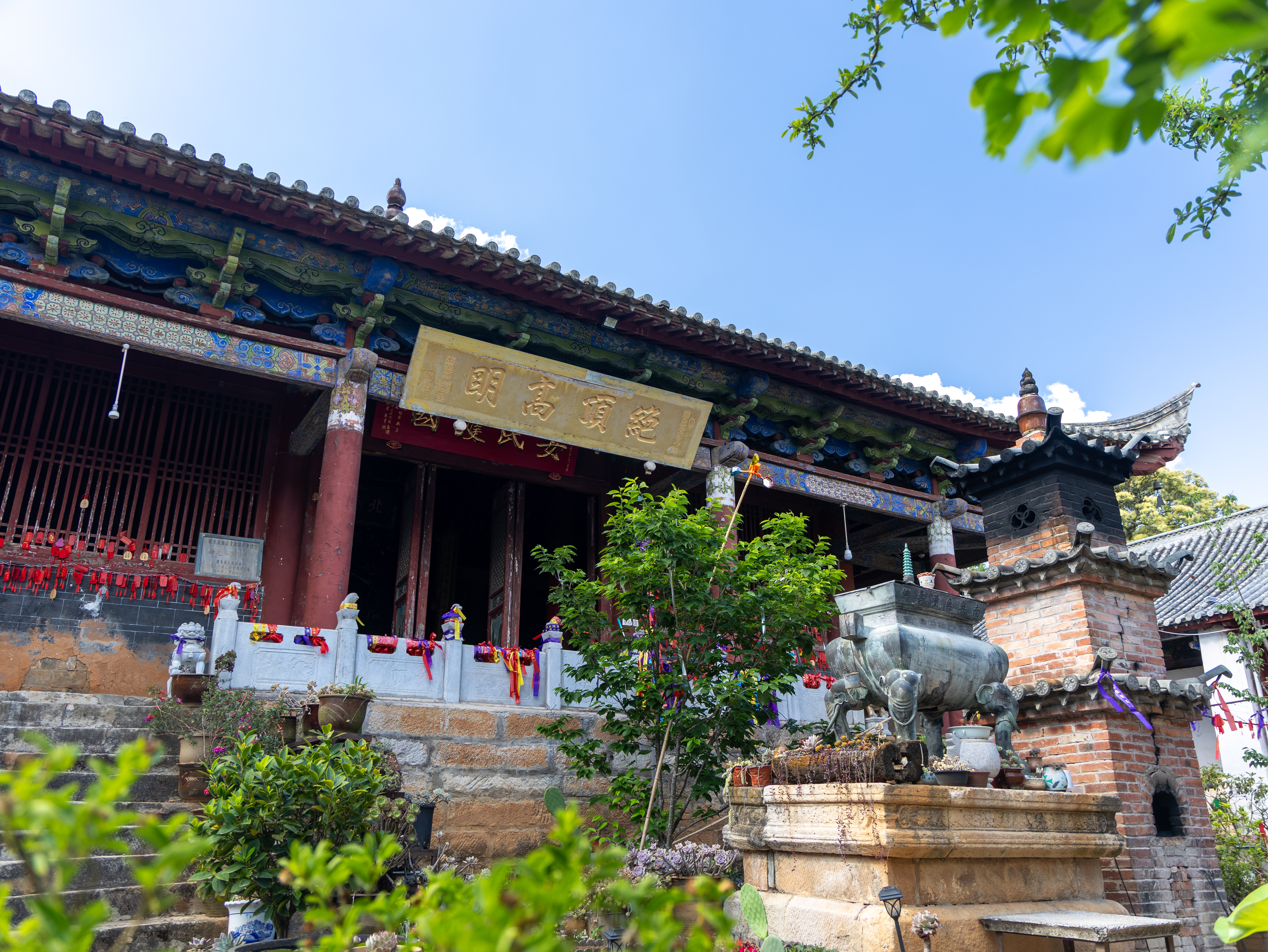
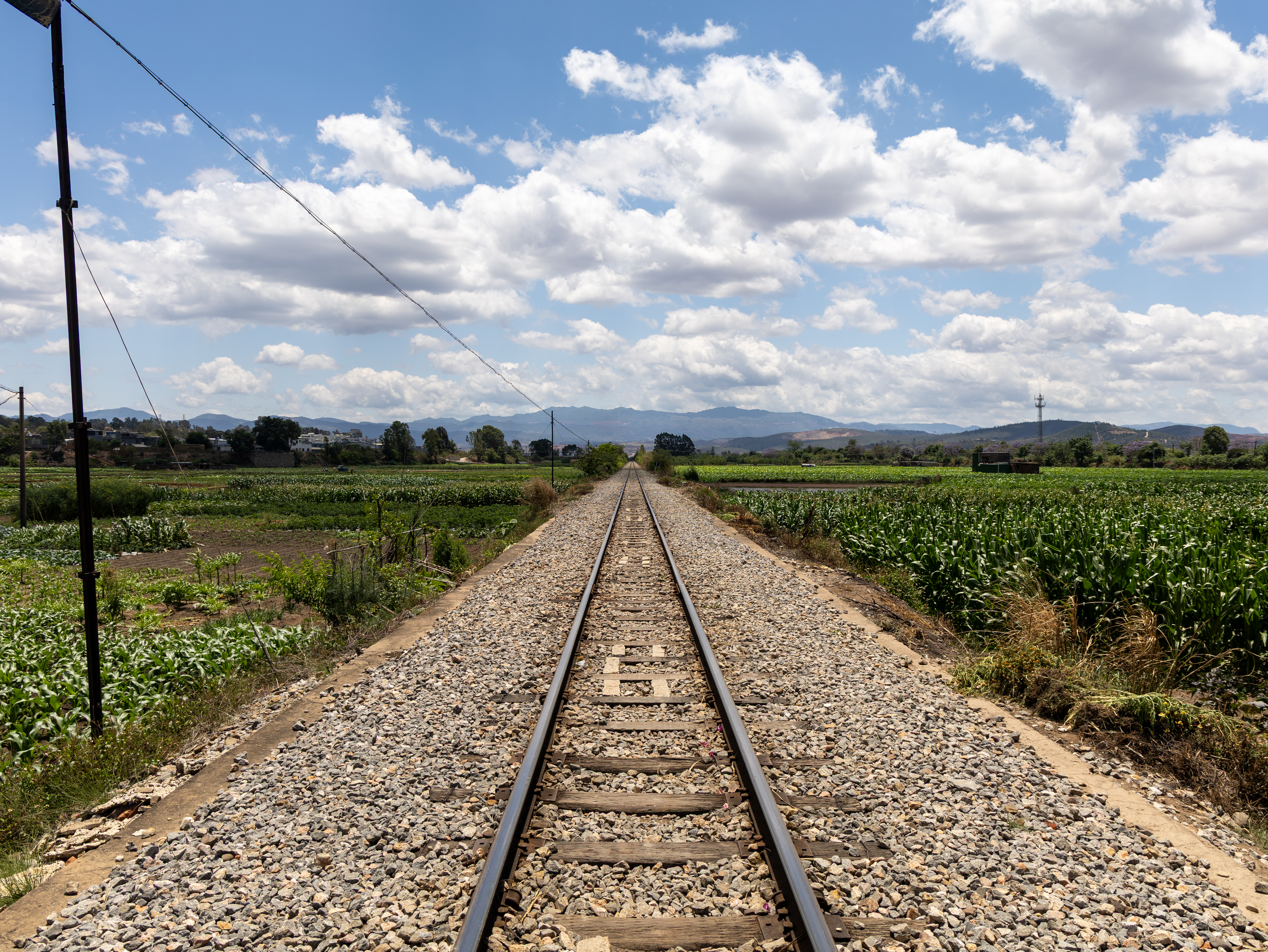
- Skyline of county town Chaoyang Gate Jianshui Confucian Temple Nalou Tusi Chiefdom Office Shuanglong Bridge Zhenwu Palace Gebishi railway

- Location of Jiangshui County in Honghe Prefecture within Yunnan province

- Location of the seat in Yunnan
- Coordinates (Jianshui County government): 23°38′09″N 102°49′34″E
- Country: People's Republic of China
- Province: Yunnan
- Autonomous prefecture: Honghe

Area
  - Total: 3,940 km^{2} (1,520 sq mi)

Population
  - Total: 490,000
  - Density: 120/km^{2} (320/sq mi)
- Postal code: 654300
- Area code: 0873
- Website: www.hhjs.gov.cn

Jianshui County (Chinese: 建水县; pinyin: Jiànshuǐ Xiàn; Hani: Jeifsyu; Yi: ꏧꎴ / jiep sho) is a city in Honghe prefecture, Yunnan province, China. It was historic center of the province and remains an important transportation crossroad. Previously, it has been known as Lin'an (Chinese: 临安) or Huili (Chinese: 惠历); today, the name Lin'an Town is retained by Jianshui's county seat.

== Geography ==
To the east lies Kaiyuan, to the west Shiping, to the southeast Gejiu and Yuanyang, to the north Tonghai and Huaning.

== Administrative divisions ==
Jianshui County has 8 towns and 6 townships.

8 towns

- Lin'an (临安镇)
- Guanting (官厅镇)
- Xizhuang (西庄镇)
- Qinglong (青龙镇)
- Nanzhuang (南庄镇)
- Chake (岔科镇)
- Qujiang (曲江镇)
- Miandian (面甸镇)

6 townships

- Puxiong (普雄乡)
- Lihaozhai (李浩寨乡)
- Potou (坡头乡)
- Panjiang (盘江乡)
- Limin (利民乡)
- Dianwei (甸尾乡)

== Climate ==
Climate data for Jianshui, elevation 1,309 m (4,295 ft), (1991–2020 normals, extremes 1991–present)
Month	Jan	Feb	Mar	Apr	May	Jun	Jul	Aug	Sep	Oct	Nov	Dec	Year
Record high °C (°F)	27.5 (81.5)	29.6 (85.3)	33.2 (91.8)	33.7 (92.7)	35.5 (95.9)	34.4 (93.9)	33.9 (93.0)	34.2 (93.6)	32.7 (90.9)	30.7 (87.3)	29.7 (85.5)	27.6 (81.7)	35.5 (95.9)
Mean daily maximum °C (°F)	19.7 (67.5)	22.1 (71.8)	25.7 (78.3)	28.0 (82.4)	28.6 (83.5)	28.7 (83.7)	28.0 (82.4)	28.0 (82.4)	27.1 (80.8)	24.7 (76.5)	22.4 (72.3)	19.4 (66.9)	25.2 (77.4)
Daily mean °C (°F)	12.9 (55.2)	15.2 (59.4)	18.9 (66.0)	21.6 (70.9)	23.2 (73.8)	24.0 (75.2)	23.5 (74.3)	22.9 (73.2)	21.8 (71.2)	19.3 (66.7)	15.9 (60.6)	12.9 (55.2)	19.3 (66.8)
Mean daily minimum °C (°F)	7.5 (45.5)	9.3 (48.7)	12.8 (55.0)	16.0 (60.8)	18.8 (65.8)	20.6 (69.1)	20.2 (68.4)	19.5 (67.1)	18.1 (64.6)	15.4 (59.7)	11.0 (51.8)	8.0 (46.4)	14.8 (58.6)
Record low °C (°F)	−1.4 (29.5)	1.6 (34.9)	2.5 (36.5)	6.4 (43.5)	10.0 (50.0)	11.6 (52.9)	16.0 (60.8)	14.4 (57.9)	9.6 (49.3)	7.5 (45.5)	1.3 (34.3)	−2.2 (28.0)	−2.2 (28.0)
Average precipitation mm (inches)	28.0 (1.10)	16.8 (0.66)	23.5 (0.93)	48.7 (1.92)	84.9 (3.34)	114.5 (4.51)	156.0 (6.14)	136.8 (5.39)	67.3 (2.65)	57.5 (2.26)	38.2 (1.50)	18.7 (0.74)	790.9 (31.14)
Average precipitation days (≥ 0.1 mm)	4.6	4.1	5.4	8.9	12.3	14.2	19.3	17.6	11.6	10.5	5.3	3.7	117.5
Average snowy days	0.2	0	0	0	0	0	0	0	0	0	0	0	0.2
Average relative humidity (%)	69	62	56	58	65	72	78	80	77	77	75	73	70
Mean monthly sunshine hours	201.0	209.9	234.4	240.4	219.3	154.9	136.1	155.2	152.9	146.2	183.8	181.4	2,215.5
Percentage possible sunshine	60	65	63	63	53	38	33	39	42	41	56	55	51
Source: China Meteorological Administrationall-time November record high

== Tourist attractions ==
- Chao Yang Lou (Old East City Gate), Formerly known as Yinghuimen, Located at the eastern end of Lin'an Road, southeast of the county town. Built in the 22nd year of Hongwu in the Ming Dynasty (1389).
- Hutongs or 'old neighbourhoods' with cobbled streets and stone wells.
- Temple of Confucius, Jianshui - one of the largest Confucian temples in China, after that of Qufu, Shandong, Confucius' home town.
- Shuanglong Bridge, commonly known as Seventeen Span Bridge, a Qing Dynasty bridge outside of the town. It is located five kilometers west of the town, where the Minjiang River and the Luochong River meet.
- Zhu's Garden, The restored Qing Dynasty The homes and ancestral homes built by the brothers Zhu Xiqing in the late Qing Dynasty.
- Ancient Buddhist towers, like Chongwen Tower.
- Tuanshan Residence, an ancient Yi village which is located 13 kilometers west of Jianshui Ancient City.
- The Swallow Cave, Located in the mountain gorge 22 kilometers east of Jianshui County, Named after a million large white-waisted swallows nest in the cave.
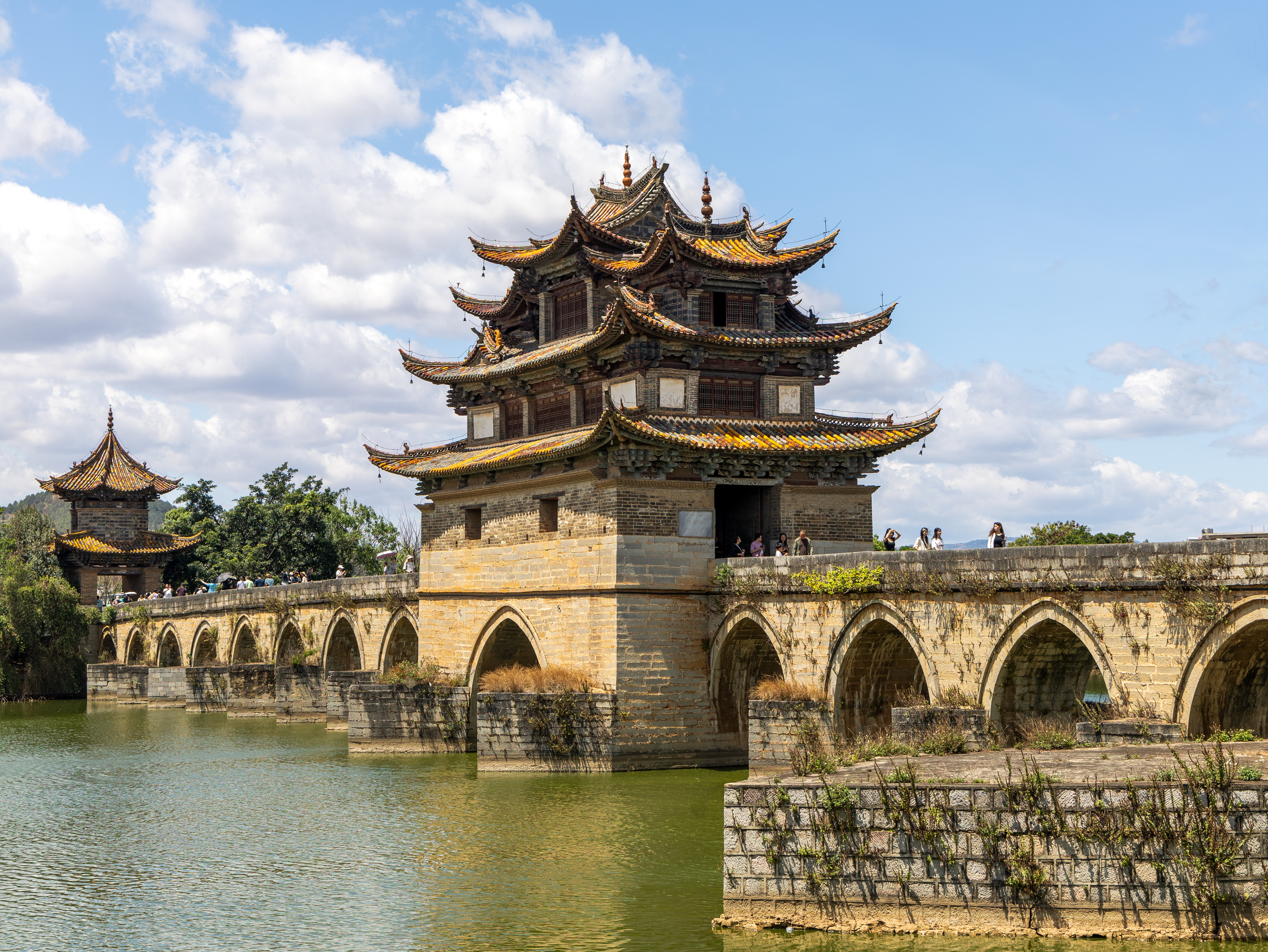
Shuanglong Bridge, which lies just outside the town of Jianshui

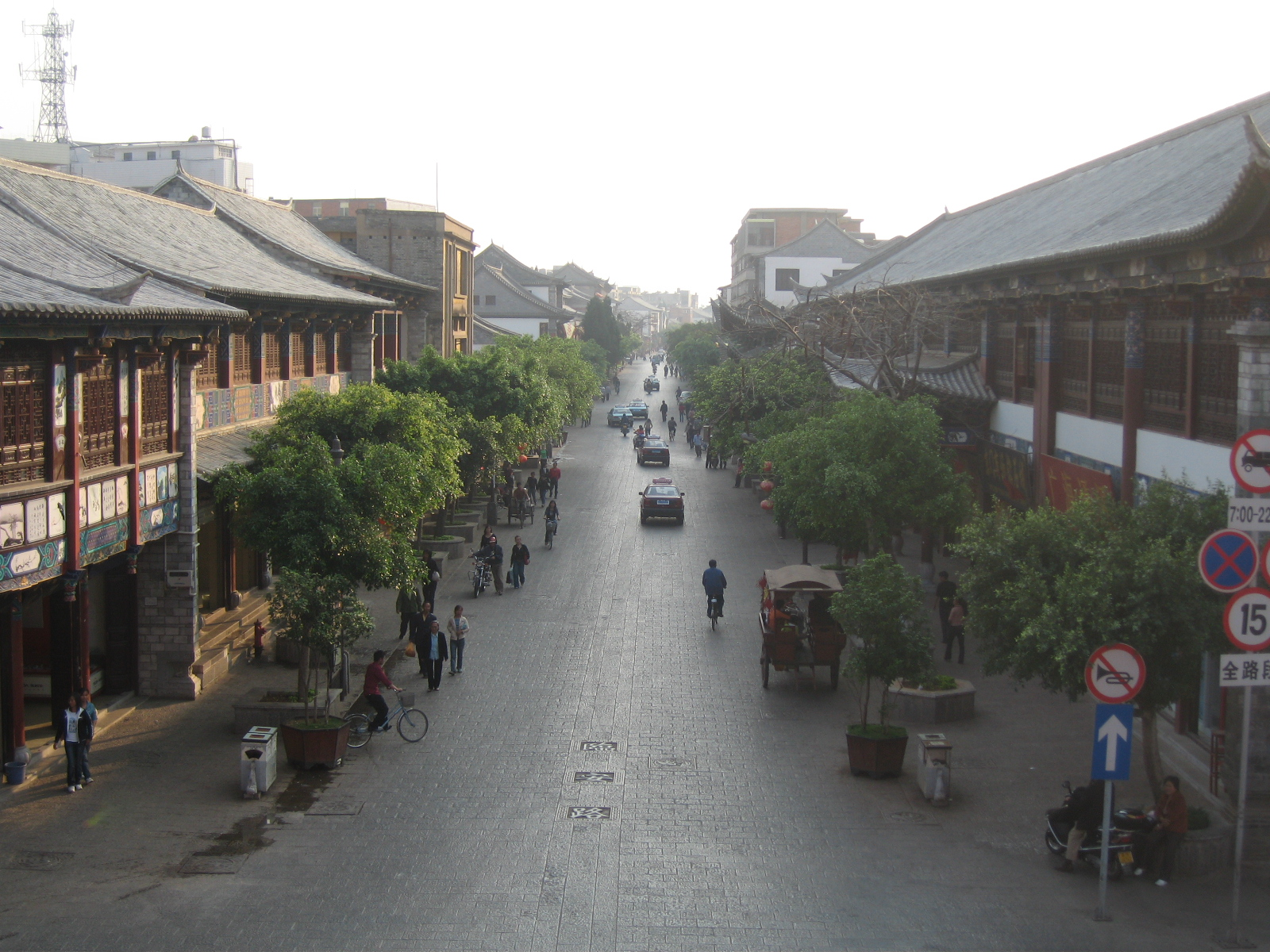
Street in central Jianshui
