= Kunming =

Capital city of Yunnan, China

Kunming 昆明市
- Prefecture-level city
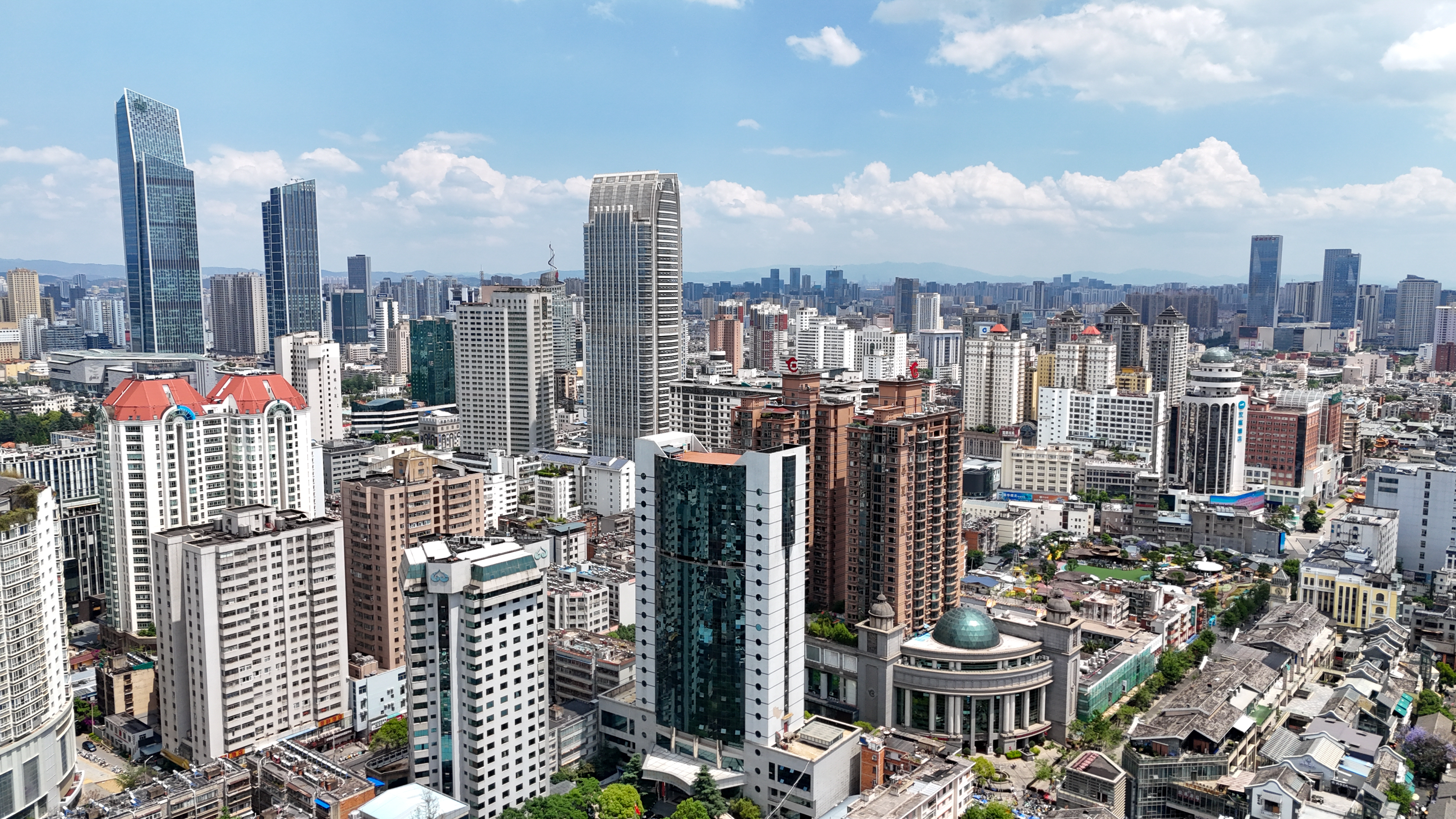
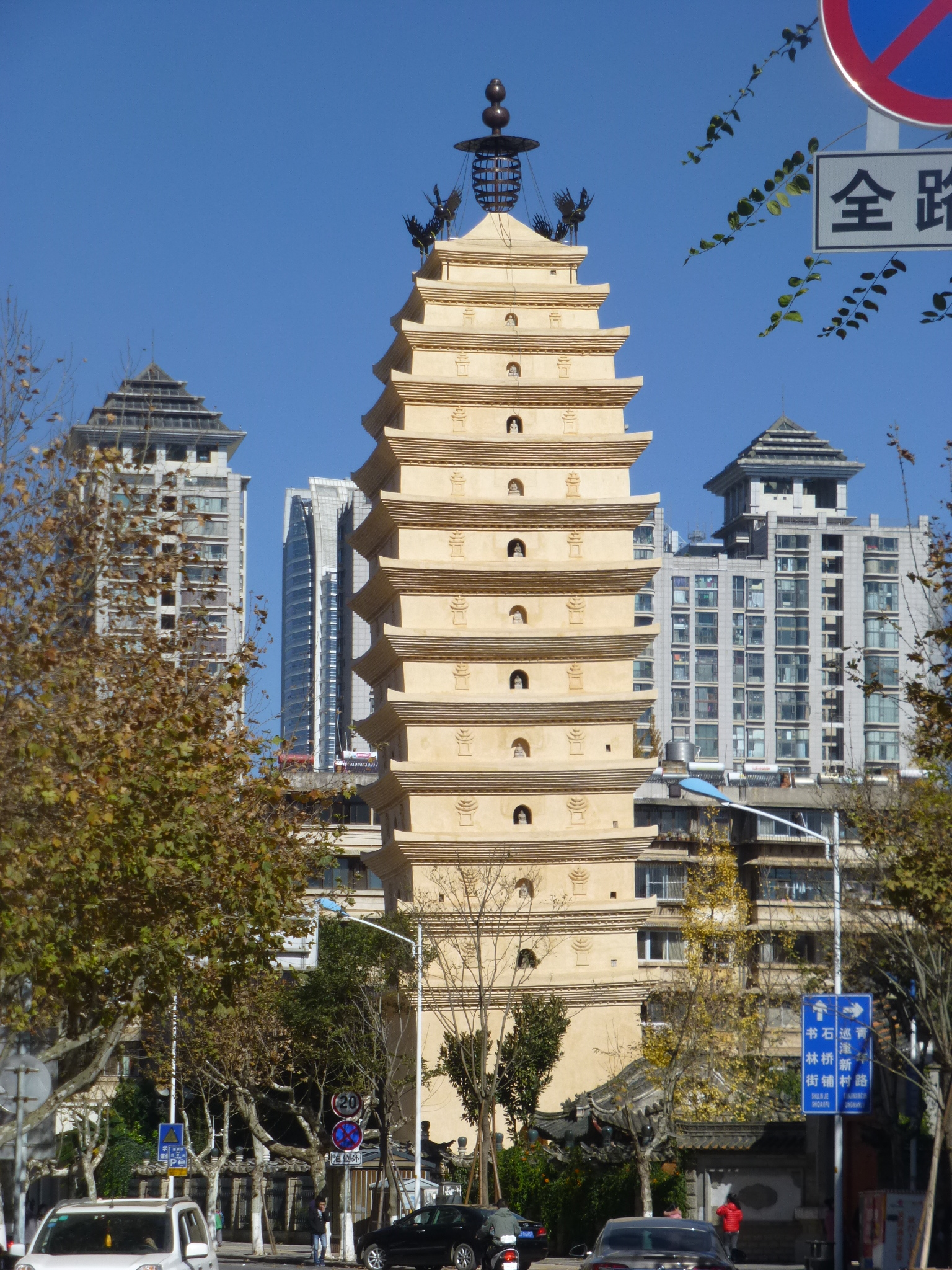
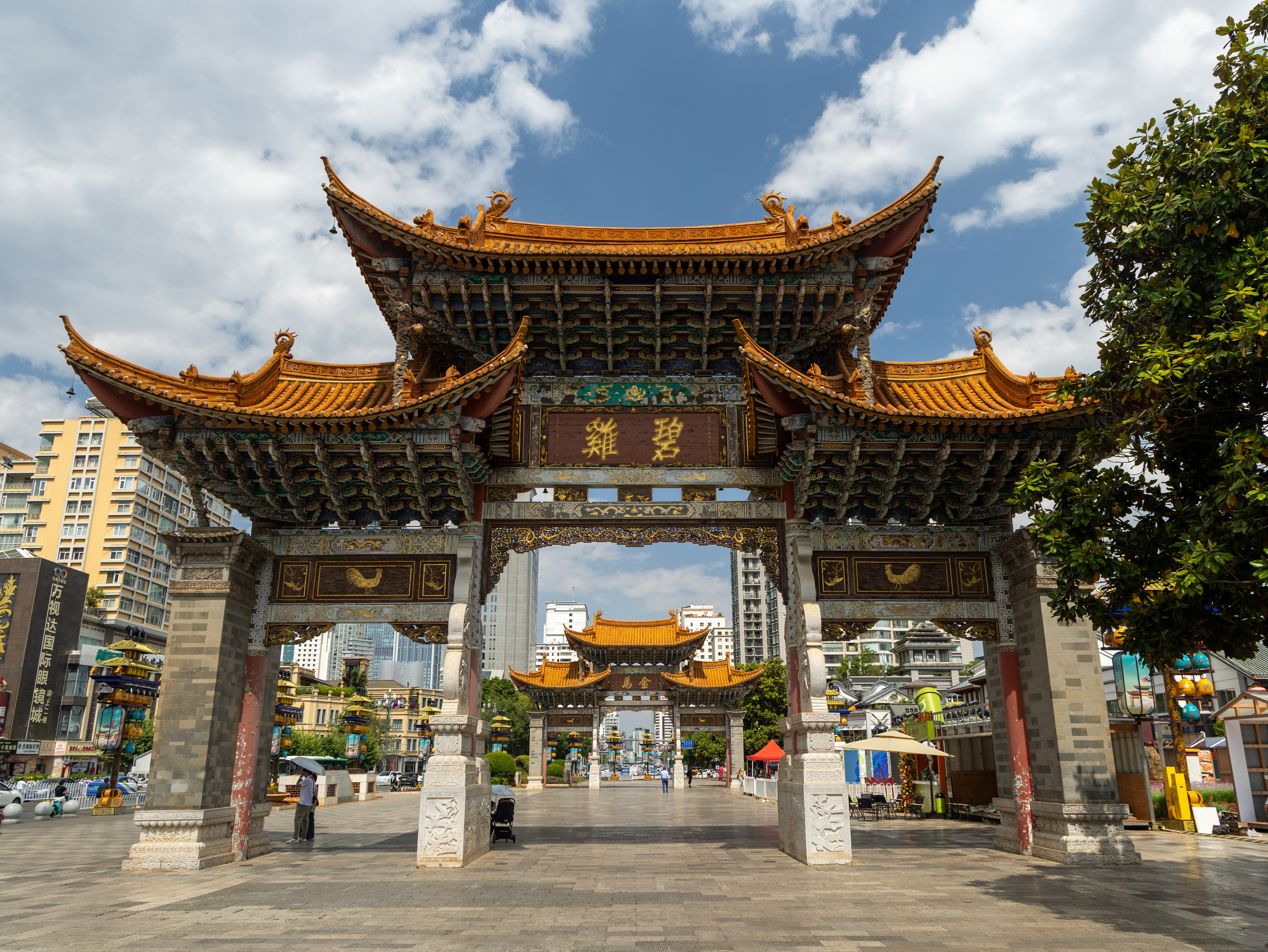
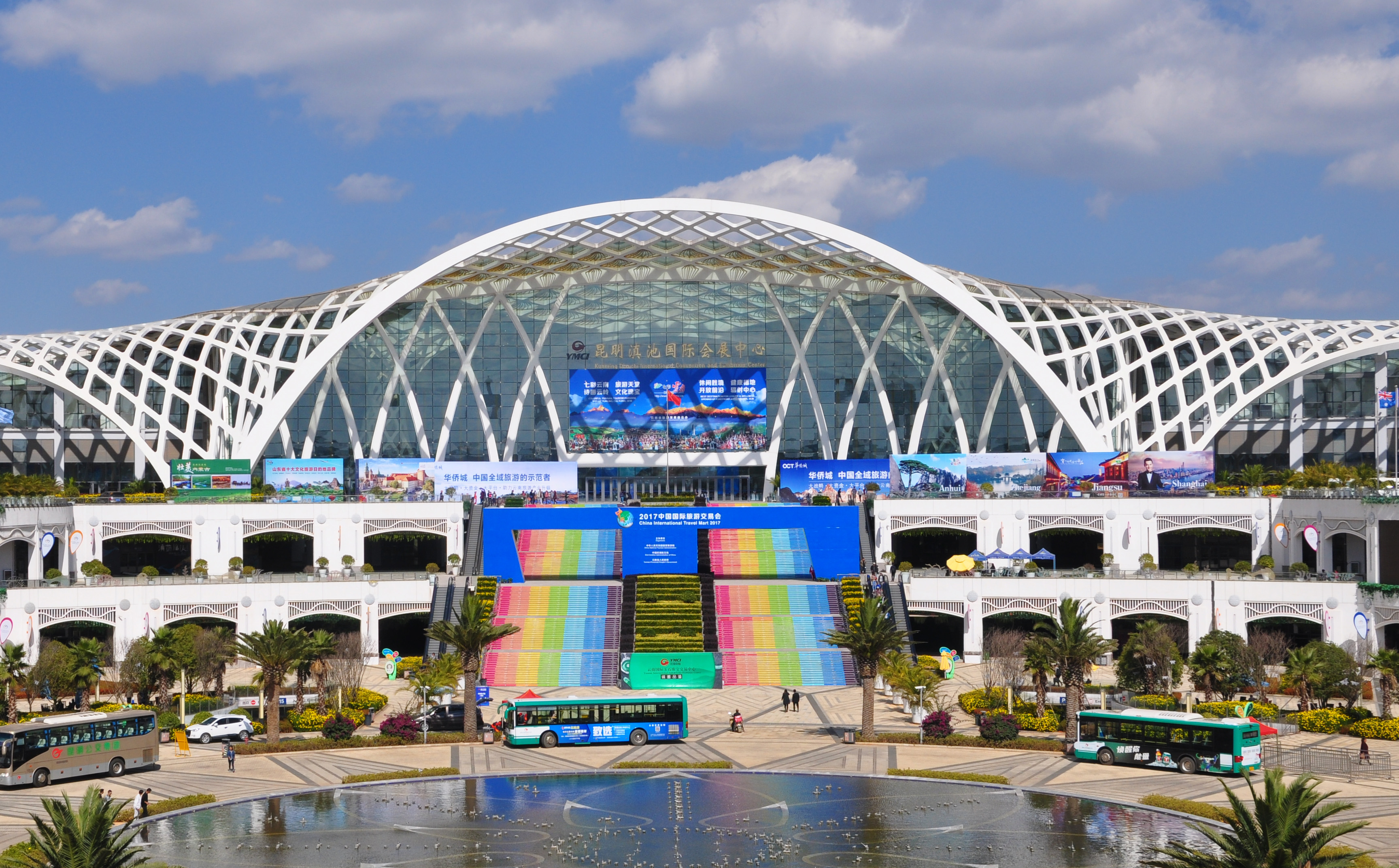
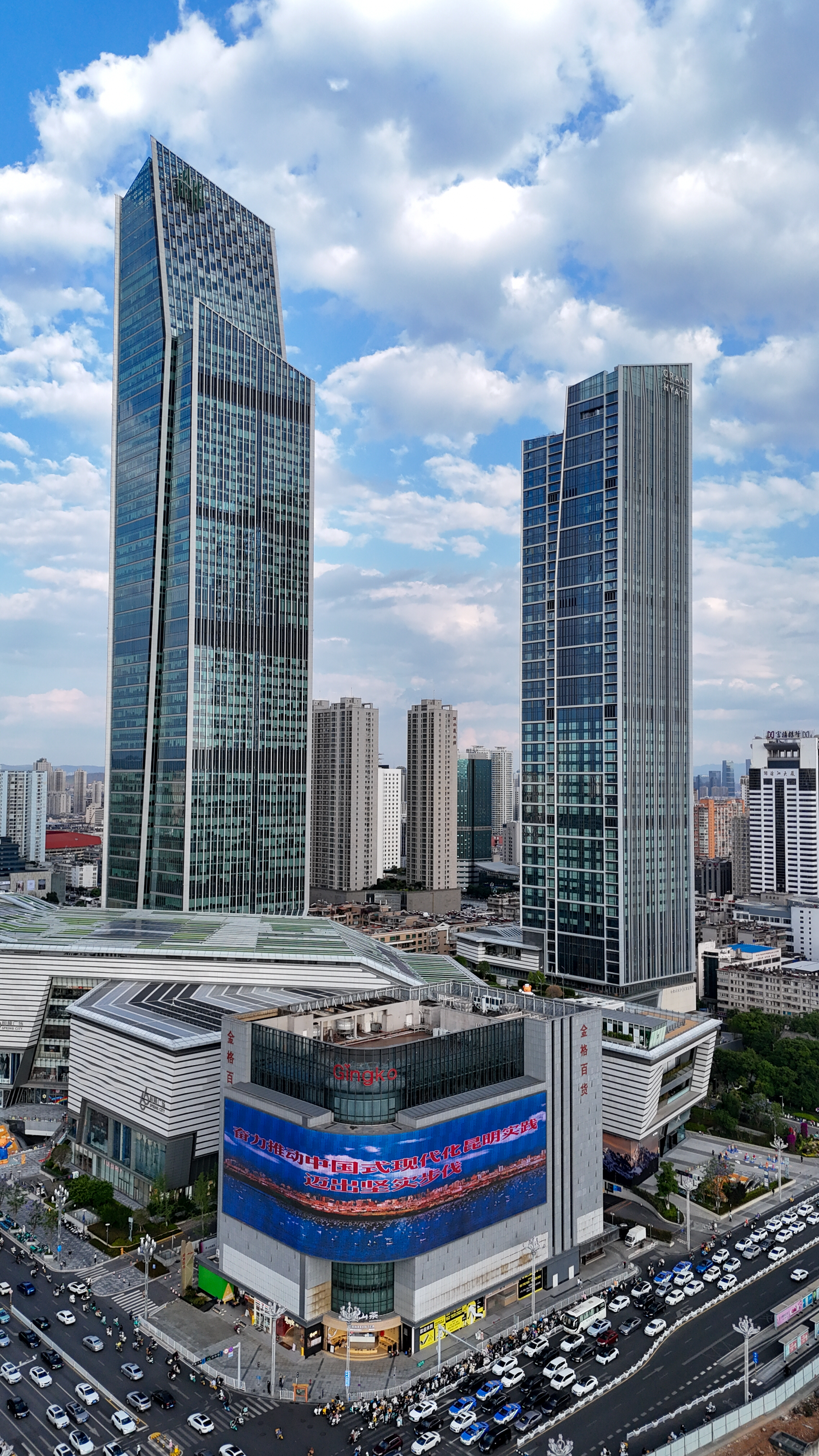
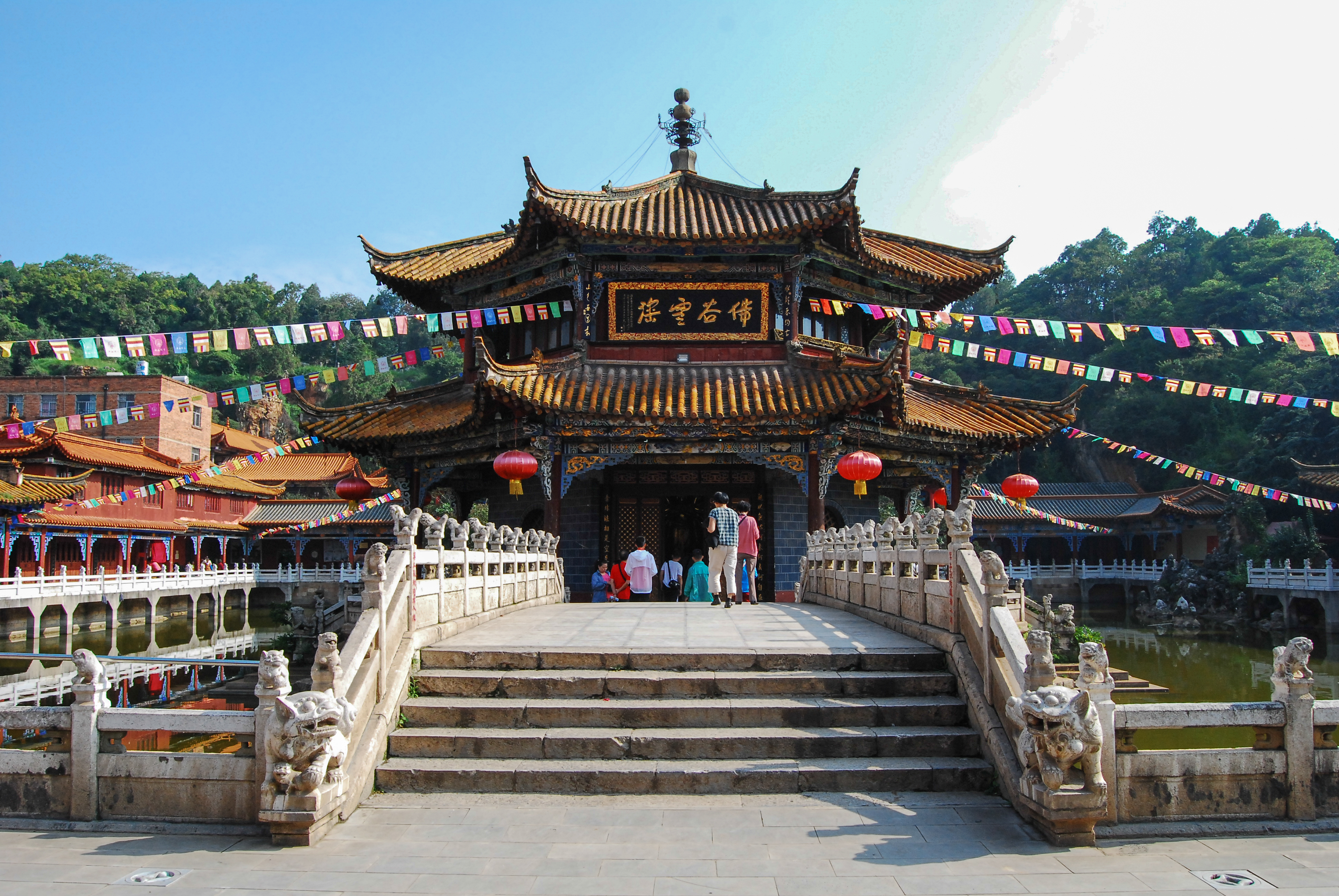
- Kunming city center Eastern Pagoda Jinma Biji Gate Dianchi International Convention and Exhibition Center Spring City 66 Yuantong Temple
- Nickname: City of Eternal Spring; Formerly known as Yunnan-Fu
- Interactive map of Kunming
- Location in China
- Coordinates (Yunnan People's Government): 25°02′47″N 102°42′34″E
- Country: China
- Province: Yunnan
- County-level divisions: 14
- Township divisions: 137
- Settled: c. 279 BC
- City seat: Chenggong
- Admin units: List: Chenggong; Panlong; Wuhua; Guandu; Xishan; Dongchuan; Anning; Jinning; Fumin; Yiliang; Songming; Shilin; Luquan; Xundian

Government
  - Type: Prefecture-level city
  - Body: Kunming Municipal People's Congress
  - CCP Secretary: Liu Hongjian
  - Congress Chairman: Liu Shenshou
  - Mayor: Yang Chengxin
  - CPPCC Chairman: Li Kangping

Area
  - Prefecture-level city: 21,473 km^{2} (8,291 sq mi)
  - Urban: 4,013 km^{2} (1,549 sq mi)
  - Metro: 2,622 km^{2} (1,012 sq mi)
- Elevation: 1,892 m (6,207 ft)

Population (2020 census)
  - Prefecture-level city: 8,460,088
  - Density: 393.99/km^{2} (1,020.4/sq mi)
  - Urban: 5,950,578
  - Urban density: 1,483/km^{2} (3,840/sq mi)
  - Metro: 5,604,310
  - Metro density: 2,137/km^{2} (5,536/sq mi)
  - Rank in China: 16th

GDP (2025)
  - Prefecture-level city: CN¥ 863.745 billion US$ 125.24 billion
  - Per capita: CN¥ 88,193; US$ 13,008
- Time zone: UTC+08:00 (China Standard)
- Postal code: 650000
- Area code: 0871
- ISO 3166 code: CN-YN-01
- License plate prefixes: 云A
- Climate: Cwb
- Website: www.km.gov.cn
- Symbols
- Flower: Camellia japonica
- Tree: Magnolia denudata

Kunming
- "Kūnmíng" in Chinese characters
- Chinese: 昆明
- Literal meaning: (transcription of an ancient tribal name)
Transcriptions
Standard Mandarin
- Hanyu Pinyin: Kūnmíng
- Bopomofo: ㄎㄨㄣ ㄇㄧㄥˊ
- Gwoyeu Romatzyh: Kuenming
- Wade–Giles: Kʻun^{1}-ming^{2}
- Tongyong Pinyin: Kunmíng
- IPA: [kʰwə́n.mǐŋ]
Wu
- Romanization: Khuen^{1}min^{1}
Yue: Cantonese
- Yale Romanization: Kwān-mìhng
- Jyutping: Kwan1 Ming4
- IPA: [kʷʰɐn˥.mɪŋ˩]
Southern Min
- Hokkien POJ: Khun-bêng

Former names

Yunnan-Fu (former name used during imperial dynasties)
- Traditional Chinese: 雲南府
- Simplified Chinese: 云南府
Transcriptions
Standard Mandarin
- Hanyu Pinyin: Yúnnánfǔ
- Bopomofo: ㄩㄣˊ ㄋㄢˊ ㄈㄨˇ
- Wade–Giles: Yün^{2}-nan^{2}-fu^{3}
- Tongyong Pinyin: Yúnnánfǔ
- IPA: [yn.nǎn.fù]

Kunming (Note: /kʊnˈmɪŋ/; Chinese: 昆明; pinyin: Kūnmíng) is the capital and largest city of the province of Yunnan in China. The political, economic, communications and cultural centre of the province, Kunming is also a major tourism centre in China. It is nicknamed the "City of Eternal Spring" for its year-round mild climate. During World War II, Kunming was a Chinese military center and the location of the headquarters for the U.S. Army Forces China-Burma-British Raj. Wujiaba Airport served as the home of the First American Volunteer Group (AVG) of the Republic of China Air Force, nicknamed the Flying Tigers. Kunming was also a transport terminus for the Burma Road.

Kunming is at an altitude of 1,900 metres (6,234 feet) above sea level and a latitude just north of the Tropic of Cancer, and is situated in the middle of the Yunnan–Guizhou Plateau. Kunming is the fourth most populous city in Western China, after Chongqing, Chengdu, and Xi'an, and the third most populous city in Southwestern China after Chongqing and Chengdu. As of the 2020 census, Kunming had a total population of 8,460,088 inhabitants, of whom 5,604,310 lived in its built-up (or metro) area made of all urban districts except Jinning. At the end of 2024, the resident population of the city was 8.687 million. It is at the northern edge of Dian Lake, surrounded by temples and lakes and karst topography.

Kunming consists of an old, previously walled city, several modern commercial districts, residential zones, and university areas. The city is also one of the major centers for scientific research and education in Southwestern China. As of 2024, it was listed among the top 100 cities in the world by scientific research output. The city has an astronomical observatory, and its institutions of higher learning include Yunnan University, Kunming University of Science and Technology, Yunnan University of Finance and Economics, Kunming Medical University, Yunnan Normal University, Yunnan Agricultural University and Southwest Forestry University. Kunming is also home to the Golden Temple, China's largest bronze temple dating from the Ming dynasty.

Kunming is a major economic center in Western China. The city's economic importance derives from its geographical position, as it shares a border with various Southeast Asian countries, serving them as a transportation hub in Southwest China, linking by rail to Vietnam and Laos, and by road to Myanmar and Thailand. This positioning also makes the city an important commercial center of trade in the region. The city also acts as a gateway to Southeast Asia and South Asia, the Kunming Changshui International Airport is one of the top 50-busiest airports in the world. As of 2026, the city is also home to seven consulates from Southeast Asia and South Asia.

The headquarters of many of Yunnan's biggest corporations are based in the city, such as Hongta Group, Yunnan Copper Group, Hongyunhonghe Group, Yunnan Power Grid Co, and Fudian Bank. Kunming also houses some manufacturing, chiefly the processing of copper, as well as various chemicals, machinery, textiles, paper and cement. Kunming has a nearly 2,400-year history, but its modern prosperity began in 1910, when the French built the Kunming–Haiphong railway connecting Yunnan to Vietnam. The city has continued to develop rapidly under China's modernization efforts. Kunming was designated a special tourism center and, as such, has experienced a proliferation of high-rises and luxury hotels.

== Etymology ==
"Kunming" evolved from the name of an ancient ethnic group called the Kunming Yi or Kunming Barbarian (昆明夷). They were a branch of the Di-Qiang people. The Kunming Yi lived in the neighbouring region of Erhai Lake during the Western Han dynasty. The Han dynasty incorporated the territory of the Dian Kingdom and set up a commandery called Yizhou in 109 BC; the Han dynasty also incorporated the Kunming Yi into Yizhou Commandery soon after. Therefore, Kunming Yi expanded east to the Lake Dian area later. "Kunming" has acted as a place name since the Three Kingdoms period, but the reference was not clear because this ethnicity occupied a large region. In the Yuan dynasty, the central government set up "Kunming County" in modern Kunming; the name "Kunming" has continued to this day.

A 2009 research paper proposes that the name "Kunming" of Kunming Yi is a cognate word of "Khmer" and "Khmu" that originally meant "people".

== History ==
=== Early history ===
Kunming long profited from its position on the caravan route through to South Asia and Southeast Asia. Early townships on the southern edge of Lake Dian (outside the contemporary city perimeter) can be dated back to 279 BC, although they have been long lost to history. Early settlements in the area around Lake Dian date back to Neolithic times. The Dian Kingdom, whose original language likely belonged to the Tibeto-Burman languages, was also established near the area.

Dian was ruled by the Chinese Han dynasty under the reign of Emperor Wu of Han in 109 BC. The Han dynasty incorporated the territory of the Dian into their Yizhou Commandery, but left the ruler of Dian with the title.

The Han dynasty (205 BC–AD 220), seeking control over the Southern Silk Road running to Burma, Pakistan and India, brought small parts of Yunnan into China's orbit, but subsequent dynasties could do little to tame what was then a remote and wild borderland until the 13th century. During the Sui dynasty (581–618), two military expeditions were launched against the area, and it was renamed Kunzhou in Chinese sources.

=== Medieval China ===
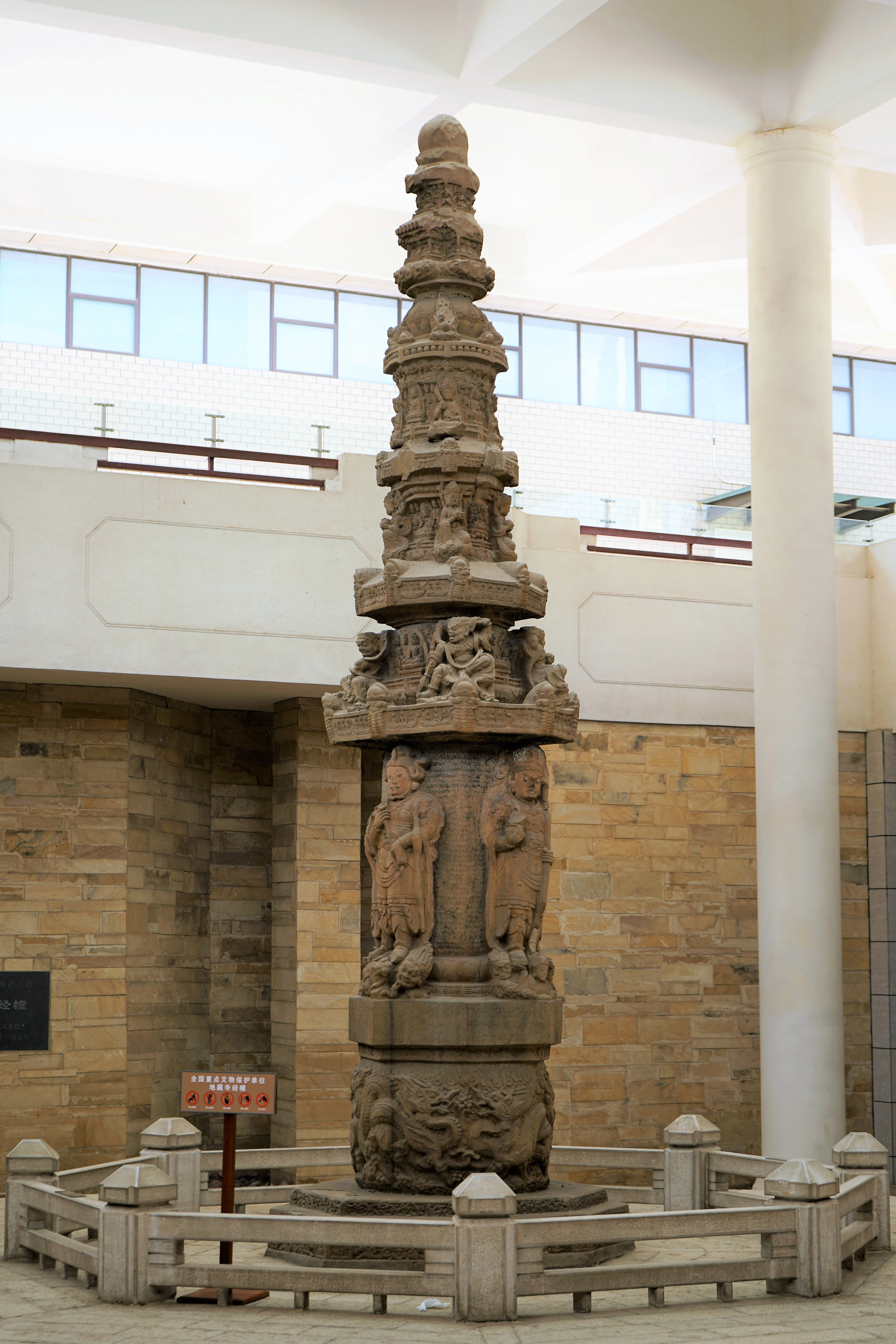
Sutra Stone Pillar, Dali Kingdom period

Founded in 765, Kunming was known to the ancient Chinese as Tuodong (拓東) city in the Kingdom of Nanzhao (737–902) during the 8th and 9th centuries. Tuodong later became part of the successor Kingdom of Dali (937–1253). The possession of Tuodong changed hands when the city came under the control of the Yuan dynasty during its invasion of the southwest in 1252–1253. During the tenure of provincial governor Ajall Shams al-Din Omar, a "Chinese Style" city named Zhongjing was founded where modern Kunming is today. Shams al-Din ordered the construction of a Buddhist temple, a Confucian temple, and two mosques in the city. The Confucian temple, doubling as a school, was the first of its kind in Yunnan, attracting students from minority groups across the province. Coupled with his promotion of Confucian ceremonies and customs, Shams al-Din has been largely credited with the sinicization of the region. The city grew as a trading center between the southwest and the rest of China. It is considered by scholars to have been the city of Yachi Fu (鸭池府) where people had used cowries as cash and ate their meat raw, as described by the 13th-century Venetian traveler Marco Polo. The area was first dubbed Kunming during the decline of the Yuan dynasty.

=== Ming and Qing dynasties ===
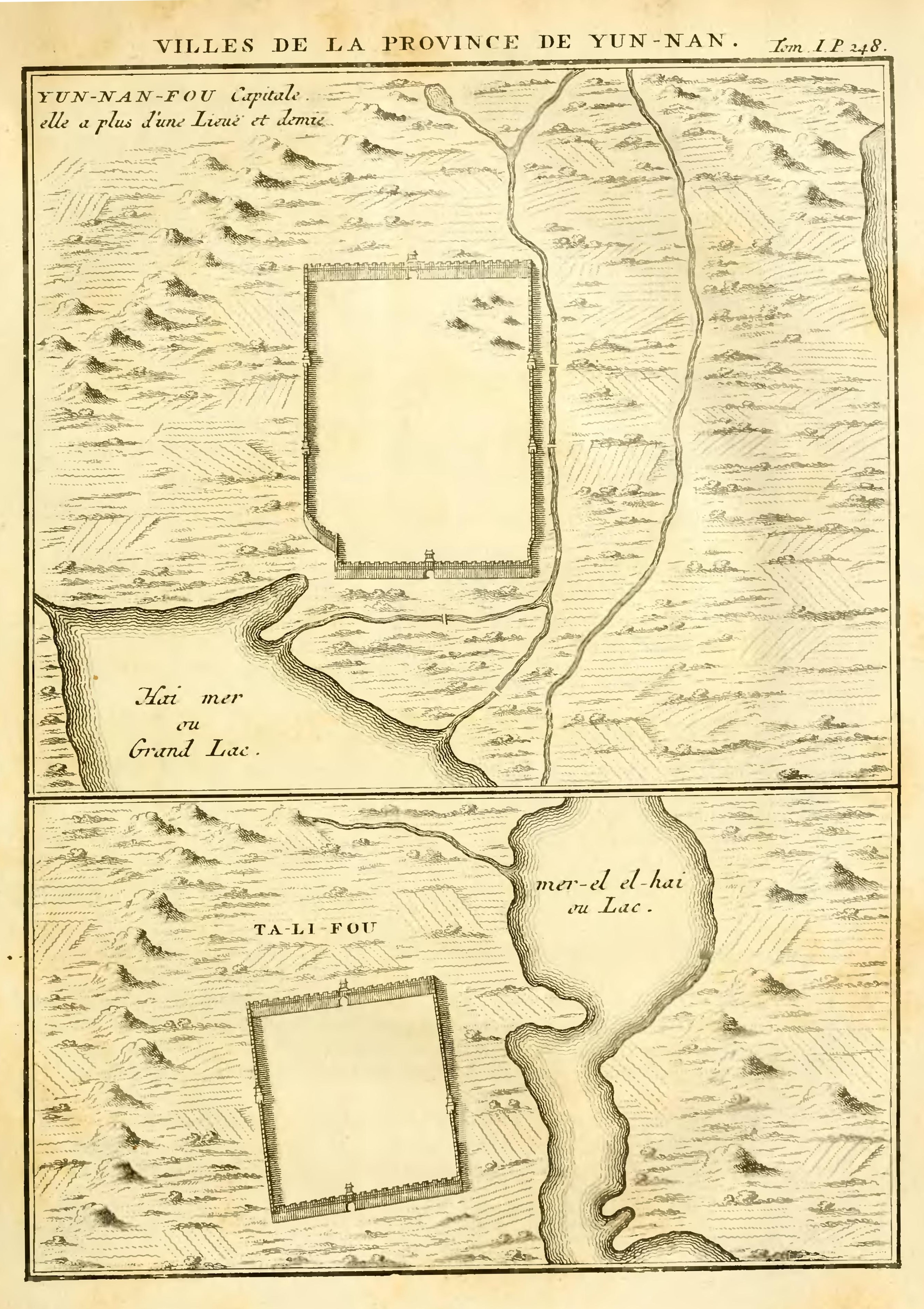
Maps of "Yun-nan-fou" and "Ta-li-fou" from Du Halde's 1736 Description of China, based on reports from Jesuit missionaries

In the 14th century, Kunming was retaken from Mongolian officials when the Ming dynasty defeated the Yuan dynasty. The Ming later built a wall surrounding present-day Kunming. 300 years later, Ming turncoat Wu Sangui held the city as a Qing governor. During the beginning of Wu's rule, the entirety of Yunnan and Guizhou were ruled from Kunming by Wu. During the Revolt of the Three Feudatories, the seat of Wu's newly declared Zhou dynasty was moved to Hengzhou in Hunan. Later in 1678, when Wu died, his grandson Wu Shifan resisted Qing forces for two more months before committing suicide, reverting control of the city back into Qing hands. During the Ming and Qing dynasties, it was the seat of the superior prefecture of Yunnan.

In 1832, the beginnings of a real city were acknowledged within the city walls and there were significant structures within their confines. The founding of the city can therefore be said to have been a predominantly 19th century affair. It was also in this century that the city grew to become the major market and transport centre for the region. Many of the city's inhabitants were displaced as a result of the 1833 Kunming earthquake.

The rebel leader Du Wenxiu, the Muslim Han ruler of Dali, attacked and besieged the city several times between 1858 and 1868. A great part of the city's wealth did not survive the 1856 Panthay Rebellion, when most of the Buddhist sites in the capital were badly damaged, converted to mosques, or were razed. Decades later, Kunming began to be influenced by the West, especially from the French Empire. In the late 1800s, the French started to build the Kunming-Haiphong railway between Kunming and Haiphong in what was then French Indochina. In the 1890s, an uprising against working conditions on the Kunming–Haiphong rail line saw many laborers executed after France shipped in weapons to suppress the revolt. The meter-gauge rail line, only completed by around 1911, was designed by the French so that they could tap into Yunnan's mineral resources for their colonies in Indochina.

Kunming was a communications center during this time and a junction of two major trading routes, one westward via Dali and Tengchong County into Myanmar, the other southward through Mengzi County to the Red River in Indochina. Eastward, a difficult mountain route led to Guiyang in Guizhou province and thence to Hunan province. To the northeast was a well-established trade trail to Yibin in Sichuan province on the Yangtze River. But these trails were all extremely difficult, passable only by mule trains or pack-carrying porters.

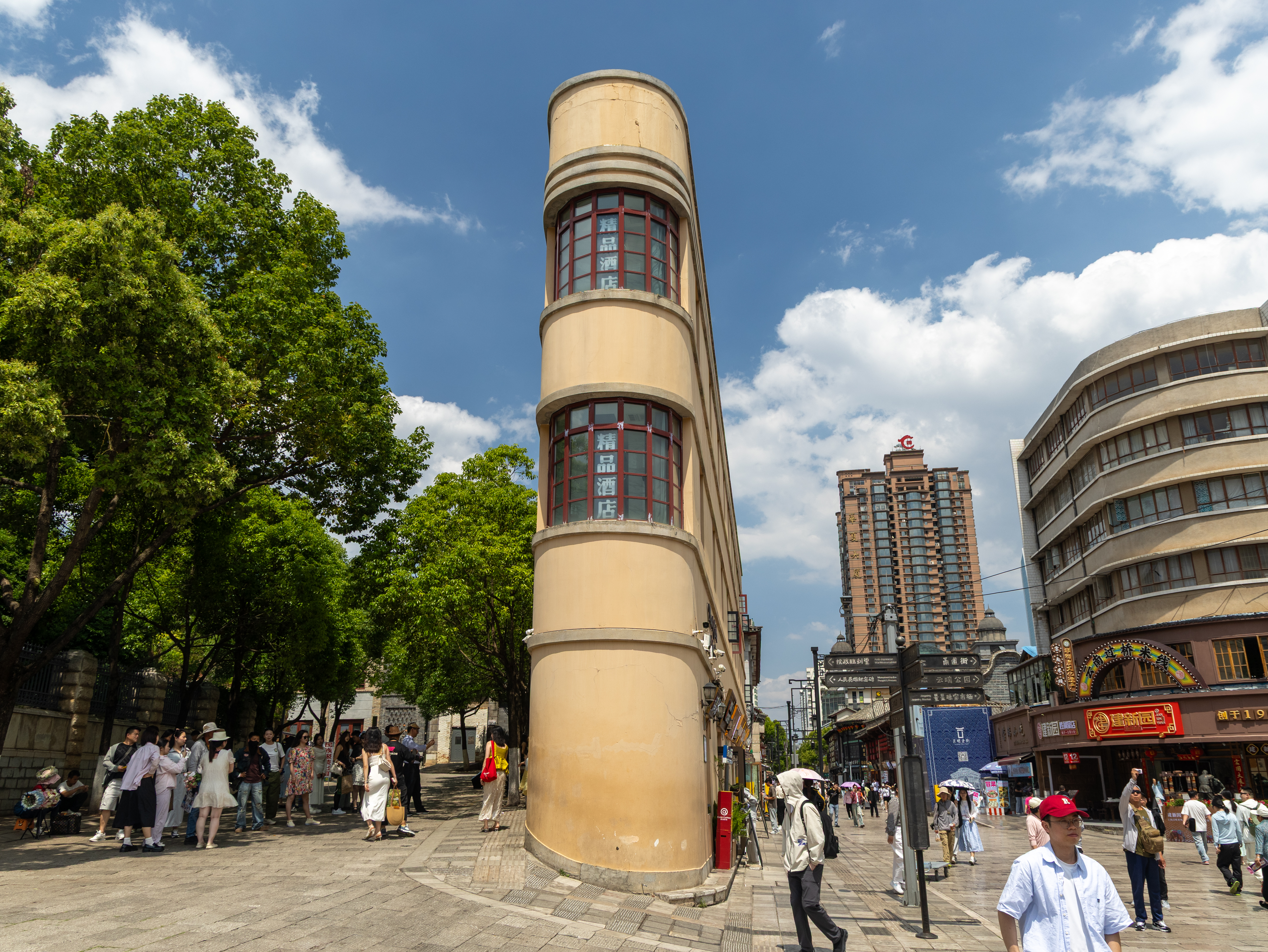
Old Kunming quarter, containing the narrow and curved Sister Buildings (姊妹楼) behind the Victory Monument on Guanghua Jie, located across the street to the north of the old Bird and Flower Market

=== Republic ===
The opening of the Kunming area began in earnest with the completion in 1906–1910 of the Kunming-Haiphong Railway to Haiphong in north Vietnam (part of French Indochina).

Kunming became a treaty port opening to foreign trade in 1908 and became a commercial center soon after. A university was set up in 1922. In the 1930s, the first highways connected to Kunming were built, linking Kunming with the rest of west China.

The local warlord General Tang Jiyao established the Wujiaba Aerodrome in 1922; an additional 23 airports would be established in Yunnan from 1922 to 1929.

Flag and emblem of Kunming City from 1922 until 1949 under the Republic of China government.

=== Second World War (1937–1945) ===
Kunming was transformed into a modern city as a result of war refugees of World War II fleeing from the north and eastern coastal regions of China to move to Kunming, bringing much commerce and industry into the southwest of China, including Kunming. They carried dismantled industrial plants with them, which were then re-erected beyond the range of Japanese bombers. In addition, a number of universities and institutes of higher education were evacuated there. The increased trade and expertise quickly established Kunming as an industrial and manufacturing base for the wartime government in Chongqing.

As the battles of Shanghai, Taiyuan and Nanjing were lost by the end of 1937, and with Wuhan falling into Japanese occupation by the end of 1938, many more of China's military forces and civilians retreated to cities outside the reach of the Japanese military ground forces a year prior to the outbreak of the Second World War in Europe in 1939, including the relocation of the Chinese Air Force Academy from Jianqiao Airbase to Kunming's Wujiaba Airbase, where the airfield was vastly expanded, becoming the new training hub for the battered but regrouped Chinese Air Force in which Lieutenant General Claire Lee Chennault took command of cadet training duties in the summer of 1938. The Chinese Air Force command established the 41st Pursuit Squadron based in Kunming, also known as the French Volunteer Group squadron in June 1938, and with them they brought Dewoitine D.510 fighters, with the intention of securing the sale of the planes to the Chinese Air Force; the French participated in some combat engagements against Japanese raids, including dogfights against Mitsubishi A5M fighters with Chinese Hawk III fighters over Nanchang, but after several setbacks, including a fighter pilot KIA, the group was disbanded in October 1938.

Although Japan was focused on ending Chinese resistance at the Battle of Chongqing and Chengdu, Kunming was not out of the reach of Japanese air raids, facing attacks by IJAAF and IJNAF bombers. Chinese military assets and infrastructure were under regular attack, while the RoCAF 18th Fighter Squadron and units of the Air Force Academy at Wujiaba were tasked with aerial defense of Kunming. The city of Kunming was prepared as an alternate National Redoubt in case the temporary capital in Chongqing fell, with an elaborate system of caves to serve as offices, barracks and factories, but it was never utilised. Kunming was to have served again in this role during the ensuing Chinese Civil War, but the Nationalist garrison there switched sides and joined the Communists. Instead, Taiwan would become the last redoubt and home of the Republic of China government, a role it fulfills to this day.

When the city of Nanning fell to the Japanese during the Battle of South Guangxi, China's sea-access was cut off. However, the Chinese victory at the Battle of Kunlun Pass kept the Burma Road open. When the Japanese began occupying French Indochina in 1940, the Burma Road that linked Kunming and the outside-world with unoccupied China grew increasingly vital as much of the essential support and materials were imported through Burma. After the attack on Pearl Harbor, and the start of the Pacific War in December 1941, Kunming acted as an Allied military command center, which grouped the Chinese, American, British and French forces together for operations in Southeast Asia. Kunming became the northern and easternmost terminus of the vital war-supply line into China known as "The Hump", which stretched over the Himalayas from British bases in India to port-of-entry Kunming. The Office of Strategic Services' Service Unit Detachment 101 (predecessor to the 1st Special Forces Group) was also headquartered in Kunming. Its mission was to divert and disrupt Japanese combat operations in Burma.

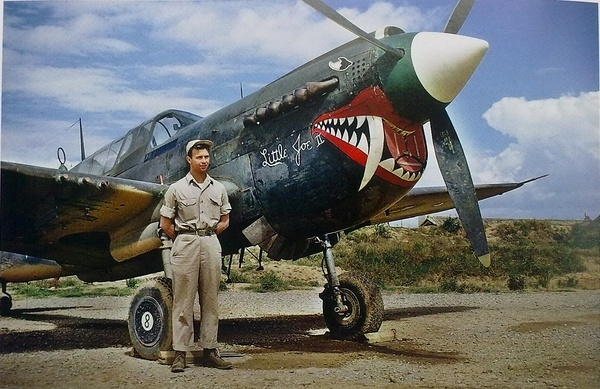
The Flying Tigers and P-40 Warhawk in Kunming Air Base, 1944

Kunming, the northern terminus of all three of the Burma Road, the Ledo Road, and "the Hump" supply-line, was increasingly targeted by the IJAAF. When the Burma Road was lost to the Japanese, the Hump became China's primary lifeline to the outside world. The 1st American Volunteer Group, known as the "Flying Tigers", was based in Kunming and tasked with defense of The Hump supply-line against Japanese aerial interceptions.

Industry became important in Kunming as the large state-owned Central Machine Works was transferred there from Hunan, while the manufacture of electrical products, copper, cement, steel, paper, and textiles expanded.

=== After World War II ===
Until 1952, Kunming was a walled city. The city government in 1952 ordered hundreds of young people to tear down the wall and use its bricks to make a new road running north–south. To show its appreciation for the young people that demolished the east wall, the city government named the new street, Qingnian Lu, after them. The existence of the walls still echoes today at place names like the district of Xiaoximen (小西门; 'Lesser West Gate') and Beimen Jie (北门街; 'North Gate Street'). There are also less obvious connections to the wall, such as Qingnian Lu (青年路; 'Youth Road'), in the location of Kunming's east wall.

After 1949, Kunming developed rapidly into an industrial metropolis with the construction of large iron and steel and chemical complexes, advancing simultaneously with other cities in Southwestern China. A Minorities' Institute was set up in the 1950s to promote mutual understanding and access to university education among Yunnan's multiethnic population. The city consolidated its position as a supply depot during the Vietnam War and subsequent border clashes with the Vietnamese. Until Mao Zedong's death, in much of the rest of the country Kunming was still generally thought as a remote frontier settlement. Accordingly, the government utilized Kunming as a place where to exile people who had fallen politically out of favor, especially during the Cultural Revolution.

In 1957, Kunming's rail link to Haiphong and Hanoi was re-opened (after being cut during World War II). It was cut again in 1979 and re-opened again in 1996.

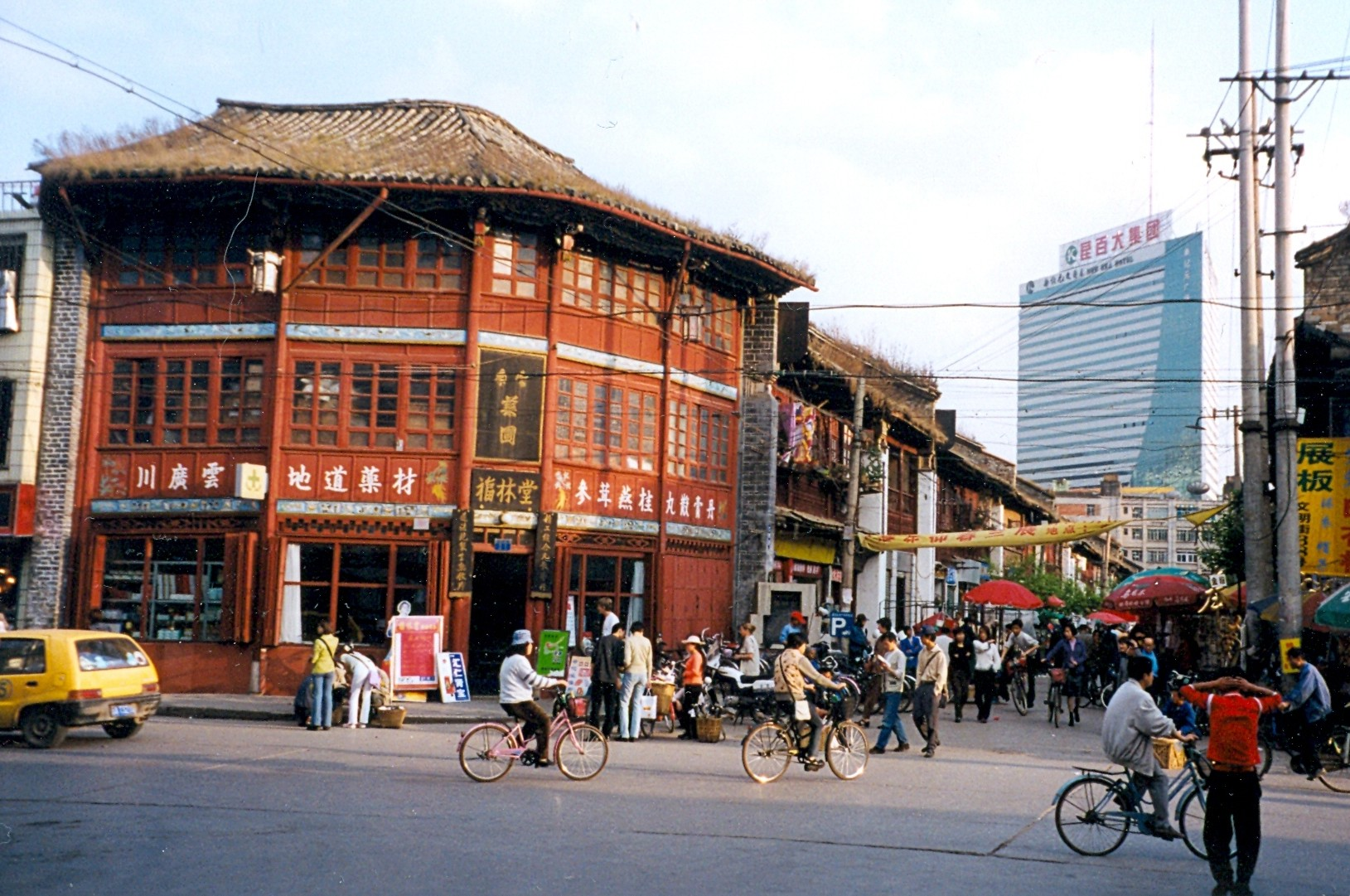
An old wooden house and a modern skyscraper in the background

Since the reform and opening up of the mid-1980s, Kunming has enjoyed increased tourism and foreign investment. Several Thai Chinese banks have offices in Kunming, for example, Kasikorn Bank and Krung Thai Bank. Princess Maha Chakri Sirindhorn of Thailand has visited Kunming many times to study Chinese culture and promote friendly relations.

In the 1980s and 1990s, the city center was rebuilt, with Swiss help, in its current 'modern' style to impress visitors attending the 1999 World Horticultural Exposition. It was primarily during 1997 and 1998 that much of the city's roads, bridges and high rises were built. Today the after-effects of the Expo are apparent in more than just the physical improvements to the city—it was the Expo that made the outside world take notice of Kunming, which was relatively unknown at the time.

In July 2005, the second Greater Mekong Subregion (GMS) Summit was held in Kunming, with government leaders from China, Laos, Myanmar (Burma), Thailand, Cambodia, and Vietnam participating. There, China agreed to lend its neighbors more than $1 billion for a series of projects. China promoted GMS cooperation as a first step toward building an eventual China-ASEAN Free Trade Area.

On 21 July 2008, explosions aboard two public buses in downtown Kunming killed two people.

Infrastructure improvements were underway to improve links between Kunming and Southeast Asia in time for the 2010 establishment of the China-ASEAN Free Trade Area. The FTA made Kunming a trade and financial center for Southeast Asia. In addition to physical improvements to enhance Kunming's trade with Southeast Asia, the central and provincial governments have made financial preparations to assist the city's emergence.

In July 2006, talks at the ASEAN Regional Forum, China, Bangladesh and Myanmar (Burma) agreed to construct a highway from Kunming to Chittagong through Mandalay for trade and development.

On 1 March 2014, 29 people were killed and more than 130 were injured at Kunming Railway Station in a terrorist attack.

== Geography ==
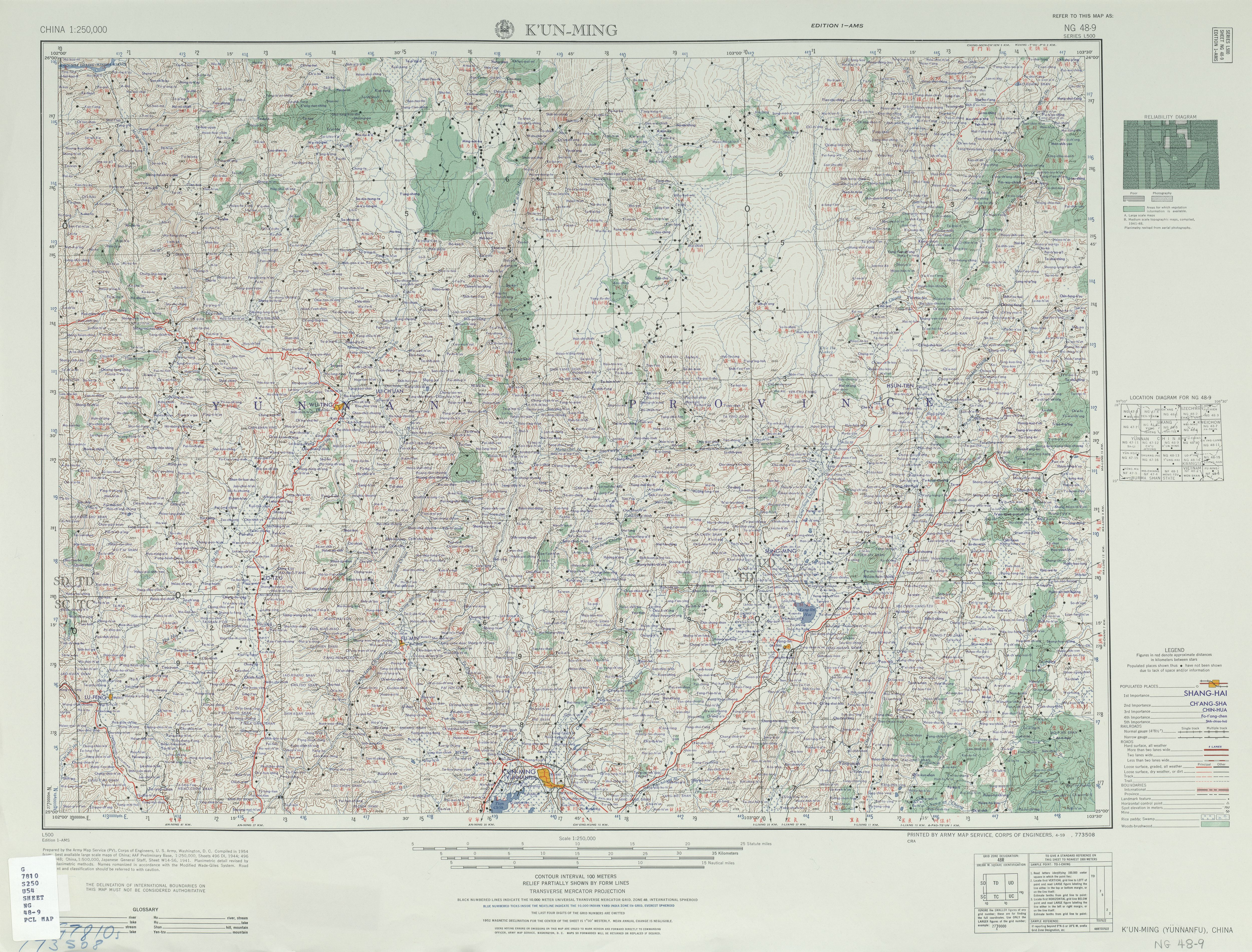
Map including Kunming (labeled as K'UN-MING (YÜNNANFU) 昆明) (AMS, 1954)

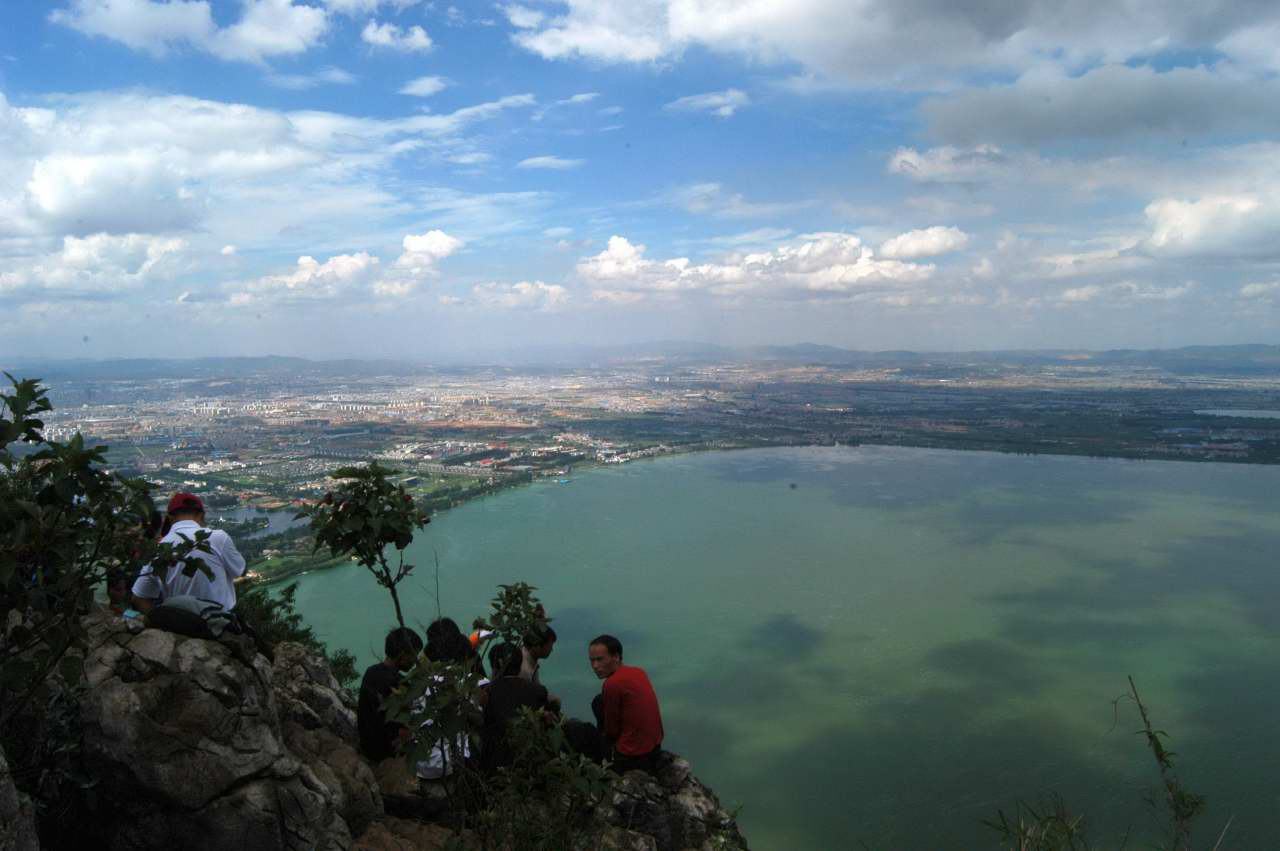
Lake Dian

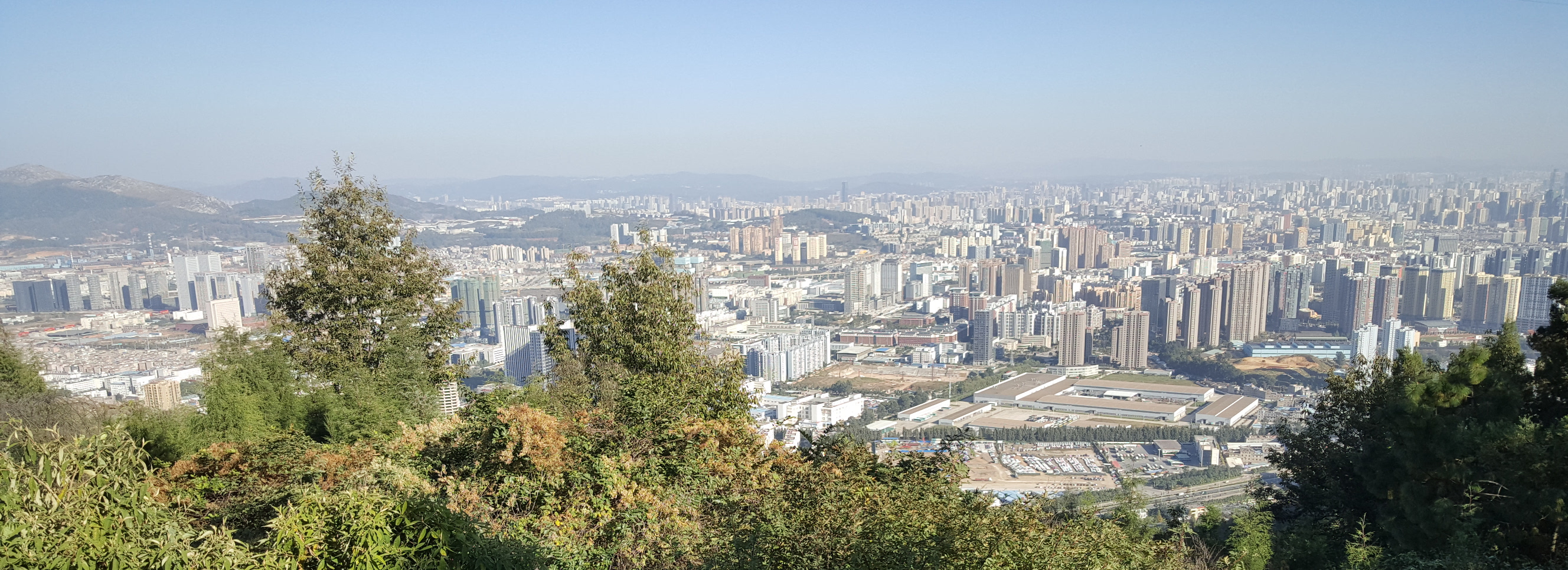
Panoramic view of northern central Kunming taken from Yu'an Shan Cemetery (玉安山公墓), looking northeast to east-southeast.

Kunming is located in east-central Yunnan province. Its administrative area is located between latitudes 24°23' and 26°22' N, and longitudes 102°10' and 103°40' E, with a total area of 21,600 square kilometres (8,340 square miles). Its widest stretch from the east to the west amounts to 140 kilometres (87 miles) while its longest stretch from the north to the south amounts to 220 kilometres (137 miles).

Situated in a fertile lake basin on the northern shore of the Lake Dian and surrounded by mountains to the north, west, and east, Kunming has always played a pivotal role in the communications of southwestern China. Lake Dian, known as "the Pearl of the Plateau", is the largest lake in Yunnan and the sixth largest freshwater lake in China. It has an area of approximately 340 square kilometres (130 square miles). Kunming's highest point is Mazong Ridge of the Jiaozi Snow Mountain in Luquan with an elevation of 4,247 metres (13,934 feet), and its lowest point is the joint of the Xiao River and the Jinsha River in Dongchuan District, with an elevation of 695 metres (2,280 feet). Its downtown area is 1,891 metres (6,204 feet) above sea level.

=== Climate ===
Located at an elevation of 1,888 metres (6,194 feet) on the Yunnan–Guizhou Plateau with low latitude and high elevation, Kunming has one of the mildest climates in China, characterized by short, cool, and dry winters and long, pleasant, and humid summers. With its perpetual spring-like weather which provides the ideal climate for plants and flowers, Kunming is known as the "City of Eternal Spring". The weather has seldom reached high temperatures in summer, only exceeding 30 °C (86 °F) on a handful of occasions. However, freak snowfalls occur in occasional winters. Controlled by a subtropical highland climate (Köppen Cwb), the monthly 24-hour average temperature ranges from 9.3 °C (48.7 °F) in January to 20.7 °C (69.3 °F) in June, with daily high temperatures reaching their lowest point and peak in December and June, respectively. The city is covered with blossoms and lush vegetation all-year round. The period from May to October is the monsoon season and the rest of the year is relatively dry. The city has an annual mean temperature of 16.0 °C (60.8 °F), rainfall of 991.0 millimetres (39.0 in) (nearly three-fifths occurring from June to August) and a frost-free period of 230 days. With monthly percent possible sunshine ranging from 29% in July to 70% in February, the city receives 2,240.9 hours of bright sunshine annually. Extreme temperatures in the city have ranged from −7.8 to 32.9 °C (18.0 to 91.2 °F) on 29 December 1983 and 25 May 2014 respectively.

Climate data for Kunming, elevation 1,888 m (6,194 ft), (1991–2020 normals, extremes 1951–present)
Month	Jan	Feb	Mar	Apr	May	Jun	Jul	Aug	Sep	Oct	Nov	Dec	Year
Record high °C (°F)	24.0 (75.2)	26.4 (79.5)	28.8 (83.8)	32.1 (89.8)	32.9 (91.2)	32.6 (90.7)	31.0 (87.8)	30.9 (87.6)	30.4 (86.7)	29.1 (84.4)	26.4 (79.5)	25.1 (77.2)	32.9 (91.2)
Mean maximum °C (°F)	20.3 (68.5)	22.8 (73.0)	25.9 (78.6)	28.5 (83.3)	29.8 (85.6)	29.5 (85.1)	28.6 (83.5)	28.5 (83.3)	27.4 (81.3)	25.0 (77.0)	22.4 (72.3)	20.0 (68.0)	30.5 (86.9)
Mean daily maximum °C (°F)	16.3 (61.3)	18.5 (65.3)	21.8 (71.2)	24.3 (75.7)	25.2 (77.4)	25.4 (77.7)	24.8 (76.6)	25.0 (77.0)	23.5 (74.3)	21.1 (70.0)	18.7 (65.7)	16.0 (60.8)	21.7 (71.1)
Daily mean °C (°F)	9.3 (48.7)	11.5 (52.7)	14.8 (58.6)	17.8 (64.0)	19.6 (67.3)	20.7 (69.3)	20.5 (68.9)	20.2 (68.4)	18.8 (65.8)	16.2 (61.2)	12.5 (54.5)	9.5 (49.1)	16.0 (60.8)
Mean daily minimum °C (°F)	4.0 (39.2)	5.8 (42.4)	8.9 (48.0)	12.0 (53.6)	14.9 (58.8)	17.3 (63.1)	17.6 (63.7)	17.2 (63.0)	15.7 (60.3)	12.9 (55.2)	8.2 (46.8)	4.8 (40.6)	11.6 (52.9)
Mean minimum °C (°F)	−1.5 (29.3)	0.4 (32.7)	2.8 (37.0)	6.9 (44.4)	11.2 (52.2)	14.5 (58.1)	15.3 (59.5)	14.8 (58.6)	12.2 (54.0)	8.9 (48.0)	3.2 (37.8)	−1.1 (30.0)	−2.8 (27.0)
Record low °C (°F)	−5.7 (21.7)	−2.6 (27.3)	−5.2 (22.6)	−0.2 (31.6)	5.1 (41.2)	8.8 (47.8)	10.1 (50.2)	10.4 (50.7)	5.4 (41.7)	0.1 (32.2)	−2.4 (27.7)	−7.8 (18.0)	−7.8 (18.0)
Average precipitation mm (inches)	23.8 (0.94)	11.9 (0.47)	19.6 (0.77)	25.4 (1.00)	80.1 (3.15)	173.1 (6.81)	215.7 (8.49)	195.9 (7.71)	119.3 (4.70)	82.4 (3.24)	30.1 (1.19)	13.7 (0.54)	991.0 (39.02)
Average precipitation days (≥ 0.1 mm)	4.3	3.7	5.4	6.5	11.1	16.5	19.7	18.9	13.9	12.0	5.3	3.7	121.0
Average snowy days	1.0	0.4	0.2	0	0	0	0	0	0	0	0.1	0.4	2.1
Average relative humidity (%)	66	58	54	55	64	75	79	78	78	78	74	71	69
Mean monthly sunshine hours	223.6	223.9	253.3	252.2	217.2	148.0	122.6	142.9	127.1	143.2	191.5	195.4	2,240.9
Percentage possible sunshine	67	70	68	66	52	36	29	36	35	40	59	60	52
Source 1: China Meteorological Administration
Source 2: The Yearbook of Indochina (1937-1938, extremes 1907-1938)

== Environmental management ==
Rapid urbanization and agricultural expansion led to eutrophication and cyanobacteria blooms in Lake Dian during the late 20th and early 21st centuries. In response, authorities initiated ecological restoration projects. A notable development was the construction of a 100-kilometre (62 mi) ecological corridor (greenway) around the lake's perimeter, completed in the 2020s, designed to intercept agricultural runoff and restore wetland habitats. These measures, alongside upgraded sewage treatment facilities, have been implemented to address the lake's water quality issues.

== Demographics ==
The population of Han is 5,542,314, accounting for 86.16%; the population of all ethnic minorities add up to 889,898, accounting for 13.84%. Some of the 26 nationalities in the province live in Kunming, and the average life expectancy of the city's population is 76 years old.

Ethnic Composition of Kunming (November 2010)
National name	Han	Yi	Hui	Bai	Hmong	Hani	Zhuang	Dai	Lisu	Naxi	Others
Population	5,542,394	444,261	158,384	82,560	59,925	25,807	23,283	20,831	19,756	11,010	43,998
Proportion of total population (%)	86.17	6.91	2.46	1.28	0.93	0.40	0.36	0.32	0.31	0.17	0.68
Proportion of minority population (%)	---	49.93	17.80	9.28	6.73	2.90	2.62	2.34	2.22	1.24	4.94

== Cityscape ==
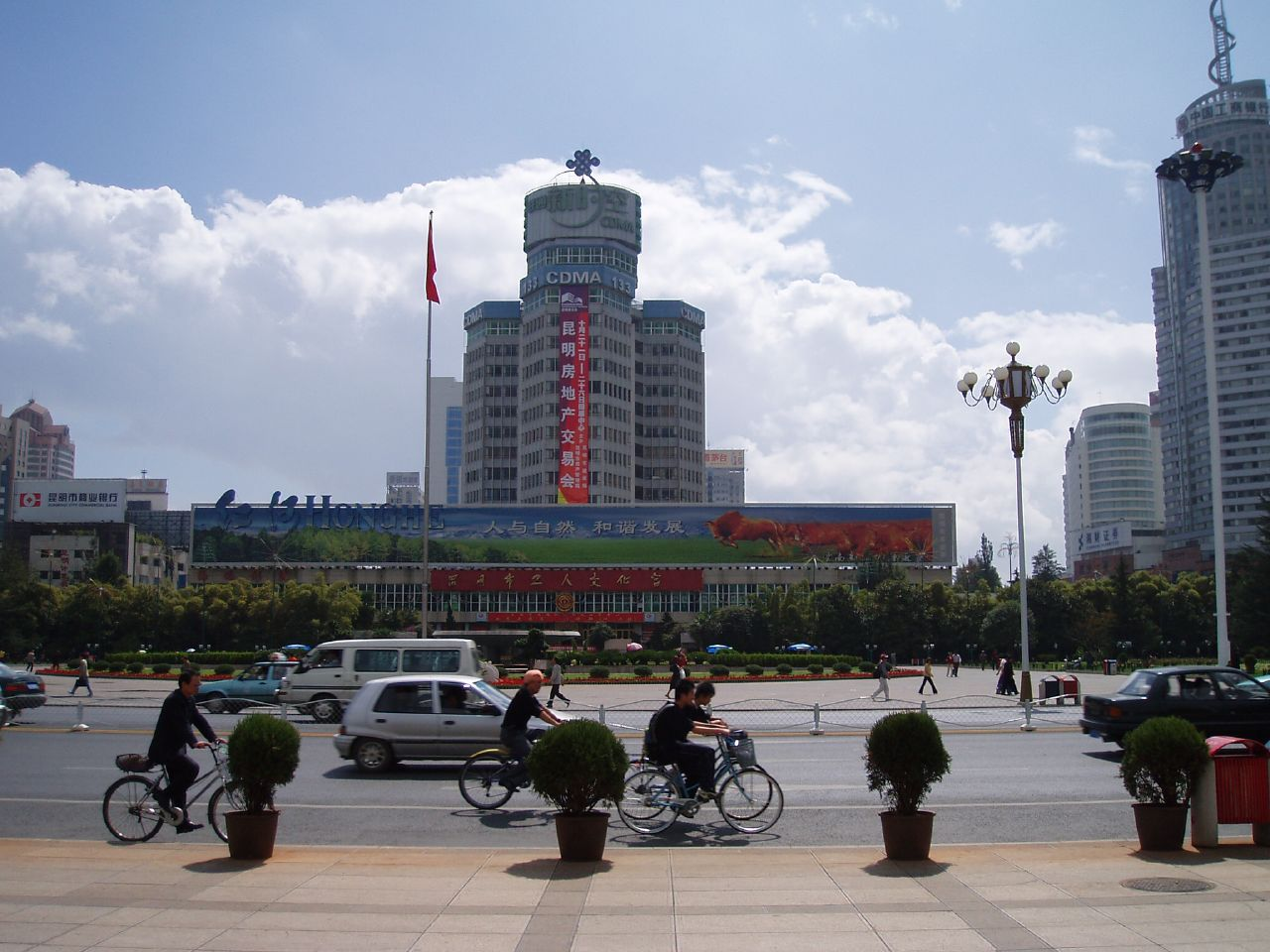
Dongfeng (East Wind) Square. The building in the background, Workers' Cultural Hall, has been demolished for subway construction.

The city center has three major squares and six major streets: Jinma Biji Square, Nanping Square and Dongfeng Square are the main squares, while Beijing Road, Zhengyi Road, Renmin Road, Dongfeng Road, Jinbi Road, and Qingnian Road are the main streets. Jingxing Street, Guanghua Street, Zhengyi Road, Nanping Street (built on top of a section of Dongfeng Road), Qingnian Road, and Renmin Road are the main commercial areas in Kunming; the most popular pedestrian streets are Nanping Street, Zhengyi Road, and Jingxing Street.

Kunming's modern city center is Nanping Square on the west bank of the Panlong River, at the intersection of Nanping Street and Zhengyi Street. This area is where Kunming's southern city wall once stood. This area is a crowded and dense modern shopping precinct packed with clothing and electronics stores. Surrounding the area are plenty of new high-rises, along with an area of preserved old city to the north. The area formerly considered the city center is Dongfeng Square, located on the east bank of the Panlong River outside of the old city walls at the intersection of Beijing Road and Dongfeng Road, where in the mornings there are crowds doing taijiquan and playing badminton. Weekend amateur theatre is also performed in the square. The Panlong River has had an artificial flow ever since the construction of the Songhua Dam, and the river has been developed into what is effectively a canal. The river receives treated sewage and wastewater from surrounding pipes.

The center is an area of importance to Kunming's Hui population, with Shuncheng Street, one of the last old streets in the center of the city, previously forming a Muslim quarter. Under Kunming's rapid modernisation, however, the street has been demolished to make way for apartments and shopping centers. Rising behind a supermarket one block north off Zhengyi Road, Nancheng Qingzhen Si is the city's new mosque, its green dome and chevron-patterned minaret visible from afar and built on the site of an earlier Qing edifice.

Running west off Zhengyi Road just past the mosque, Jingxing Street leads into a corner of the city that consists of Kunming's bird and flower market convening daily in the streets connecting it with the northerly, parallel to the Guanghua Street. The market offers many plants such as orchids that have been collected and farmed across the province.

Jinbi Road runs south of Dongfeng Road. Both of them connect to Beijing Road. Two large Chinese pagodas rise south of Jinbi Road and the city center, each a solid thirteen stories of whitewashed brick crowned with four iron cockerels. The West Pagoda was built between 824 and 859, during the Tang dynasty; its original counterpart, the East Pagoda, was built at the same time, but was destroyed by an earthquake in 1833 and rebuilt in the same Tang style in 1882. South down Dongsi Road, past another mosque, the entrance to the West Pagoda is along a narrow lane on the right. The East Pagoda is a more cosmetic, slightly tilted duplicate standing in an ornamental garden a few minutes' walk east on Shulin Jie. The temples associated with both pagodas are closed to the public.

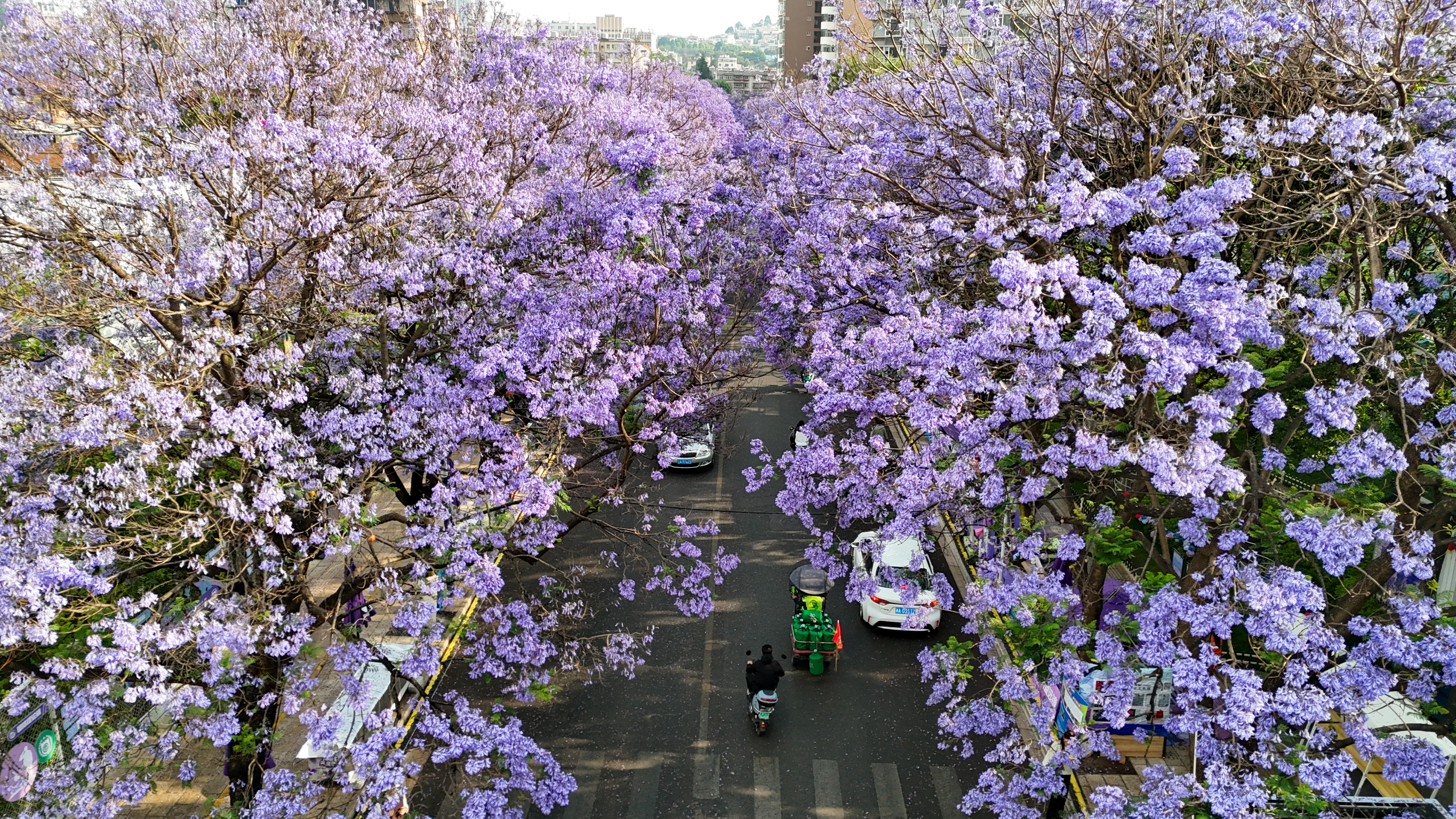
Jacaranda trees in bloom along Jiaochang Middle Road

Many streets are lined with Jacaranda trees, which can be seen blooming abundantly in mid to late April, particularly on Jiaochang Middle Road. The trees are not native to Kunming, but originate from seeds exchanged with Algeria, which were grown in the Kunming Botanical Garden. Seeds from the botanical garden were then used by the city to plant the trees along streets.

=== Parks ===
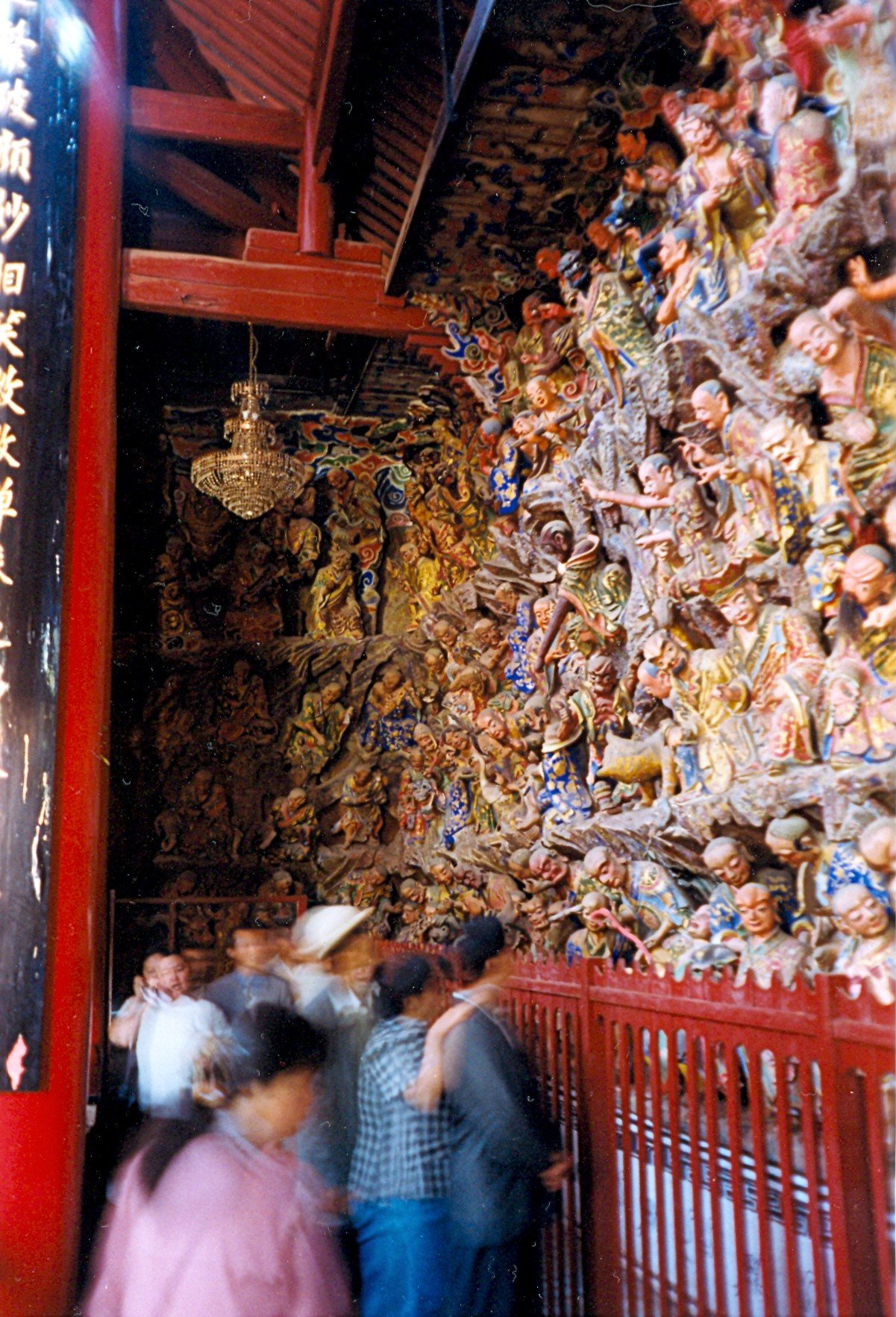
Huating Temple (华亭寺) in the Western Hills near Kunming

Cuihu Park (Green Lake Park) is one of Kunming's major parks and is predominately a lake surrounded by greenery. Located in the west side of the park is a statue of Nie Er, the composer of China's national anthem.

Another monument to Nie Er is located in Xishan Park, most well known for the Longmen Grottoes (not to be confused with the identically named grottoes in Luoyang), containing several ancient temples and the titular Longmen ("dragon gate").

Daguan Park lies on Dian Chi in Kunming's southwestern limits. Originally laid out by the Kangxi Emperor in the Qing dynasty, it has been modified over the years to include a noisy funfair, food stalls and emporiums.

Kunming's zoo, founded in 1950, is adjoined to Yuantong Park, known for the Yuantong Temple within. The zoo houses 5,000 animals from 140 species and receives 3 million visitors a year.

Other parks in Kunming include Black Dragon Pool and the Kunming Botanical Gardens in the north, the World Horti-Expo Garden in the northeast, and Wenmiao Tea Garden in Wuhua District.

=== Landmarks ===
The World Horti-Expo Garden is located in the northern suburbs of Kunming and was built for the 1999 World Horticulture Exposition, which ran from 1 May to 31 October 1999. It had the theme of "Man and Nature—Marching Toward the 21st Century". Golden Temple Park, located on Mingfeng Hill nearby, is connected by cable car to the World Horti-Expo Garden. Constructed in 1602 (the 30th year of the Wanli reign period of the Ming dynasty), all of its beams, pillars, arches, doors, windows, tiles, Buddhist statues, and horizontal inscribed boards are made of copper, weighing more than 200 tons. It is the largest copper building in China.

Yuantong Temple is Kunming's major Buddhist temple. It is Kunming's largest and most famous temple with the original structure being first constructed more than 1,200 years ago during the Tang dynasty. The temple sits in a depression on the southern side of Yuantong Park. Northwest about 12 km (7.5 mi) from the city center is the Qiongzhu Si (Bamboo Temple) built in 639 and rebuilt in 1422 to 1428. Numerous Buddhist temples line the road to the Dragon Gate (龙门) in the Western Mountains.

Notable museums in Kunming include:

- Yunnan Provincial Museum
- Kunming City Museum (redeveloped in 2014)
- Kunming Natural History Museum of Zoology (opened in November 2006)
- Yunnan Ethnology Museum (opened 1995)

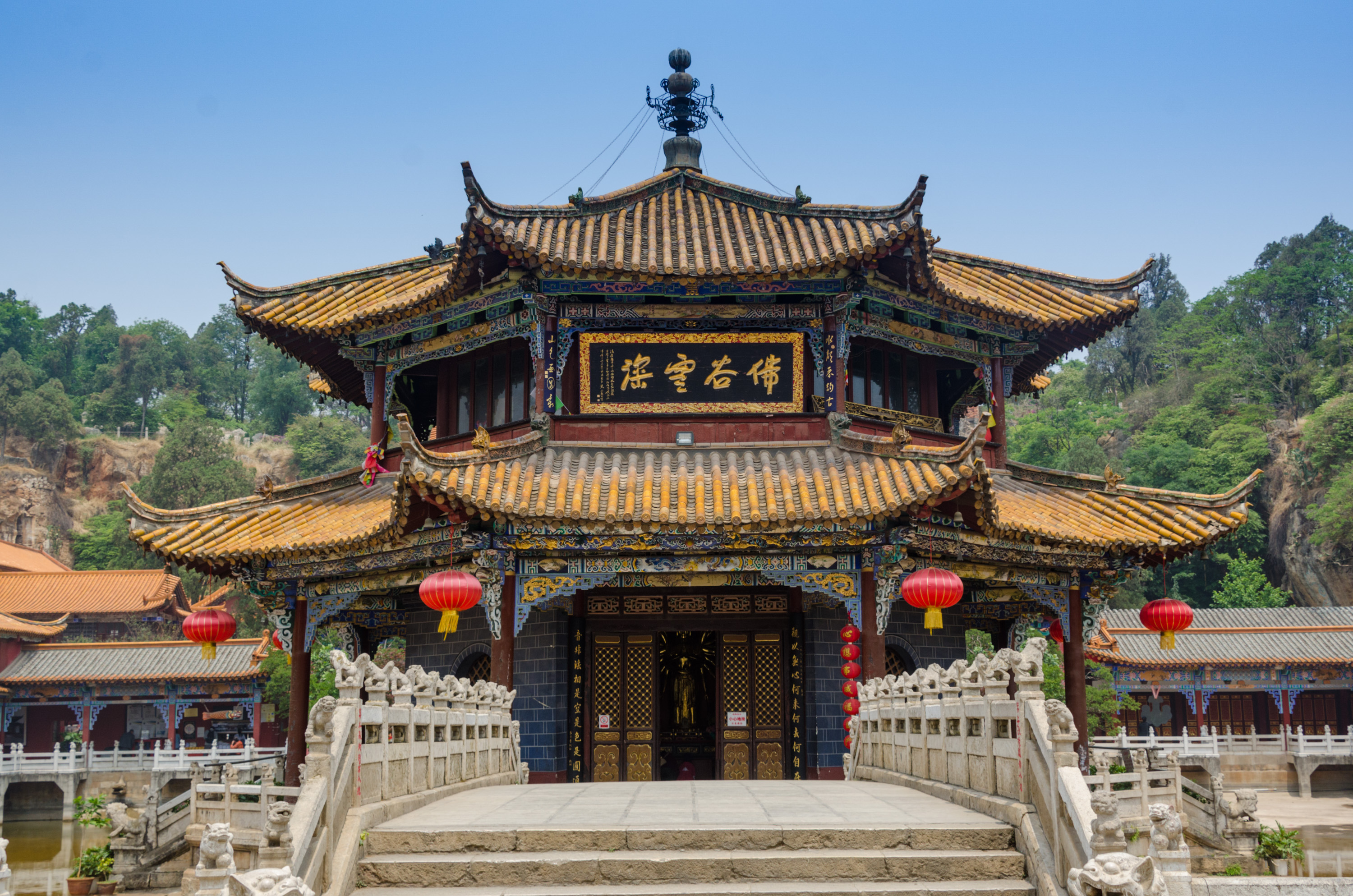
Yuantong Temple, the largest Buddhist complex in Kunming

== Administrative divisions ==
The prefecture-level city of Kunming has jurisdiction over 14 subdivisions; seven districts, one county-level city, three counties and three autonomous counties. Kunming also borders with Panzhihua prefecture level city and Liangshan Yi Autonomous Prefecture of Sichuan province.

The historical city and current city center of Kunming is in southeastern Wuhua District, close to where the four main districts converge. However, after integrating it into Kunming in 2011, the Kunming city government has built a master-planned new city center in Chenggong District and moved the city government offices there.

Kunming plans to incorporate the two new districts (Chenggong and Jinning) as urban districts over the next few years.

Map
Name	Simplified Chinese	Hanyu Pinyin	Population (2020 census)	Area (km^{2})	Density (/km^{2})
City Proper
Chenggong District	呈贡区	Chénggòng Qū	649,501	510	1,273.5
Panlong District	盘龙区	Pánlóng Qū	987,955	869	1,136.9
Wuhua District	五华区	Wǔhuá Qū	1,143,085	315	3,628.8
Guandu District	官渡区	Guāndù Qū	1,602,279	633	2,531.2
Xishan District	西山区	Xīshān Qū	960,746	880	1,091.8
Suburban and satellite city
Jinning District	晋宁区	Jìnníng Qū	346,268	1,337	259.0
Dongchuan District	东川区	Dōngchuān Qū	260,744	1,866	139.7
Anning city	安宁市	Ānníng Shì	483,753	1,303	371.2
Rural
Fumin County	富民县	Fùmín Xiàn	149,506	1,060	141
Yiliang County	宜良县	Yíliáng Xiàn	384,875	1,913	201
Songming County	嵩明县	Sōngmíng Xiàn	410,929	826	497.5
Shilin Yi Autonomous County	石林彝族自治县	Shílín Yízú Zìzhìxiàn	240,827	1,680	143.3
Luquan Yi and Miao Autonomous County	禄劝彝族苗族自治县	Lùquàn Yízú Miáozú Zìzhìxiàn	378,881	4,234	89.5
Xundian Hui and Yi Autonomous County	寻甸回族彝族自治县	Xúndiàn Huízú Yízú Zìzhìxiàn	460,739	3,588	128.4

== Society and culture ==
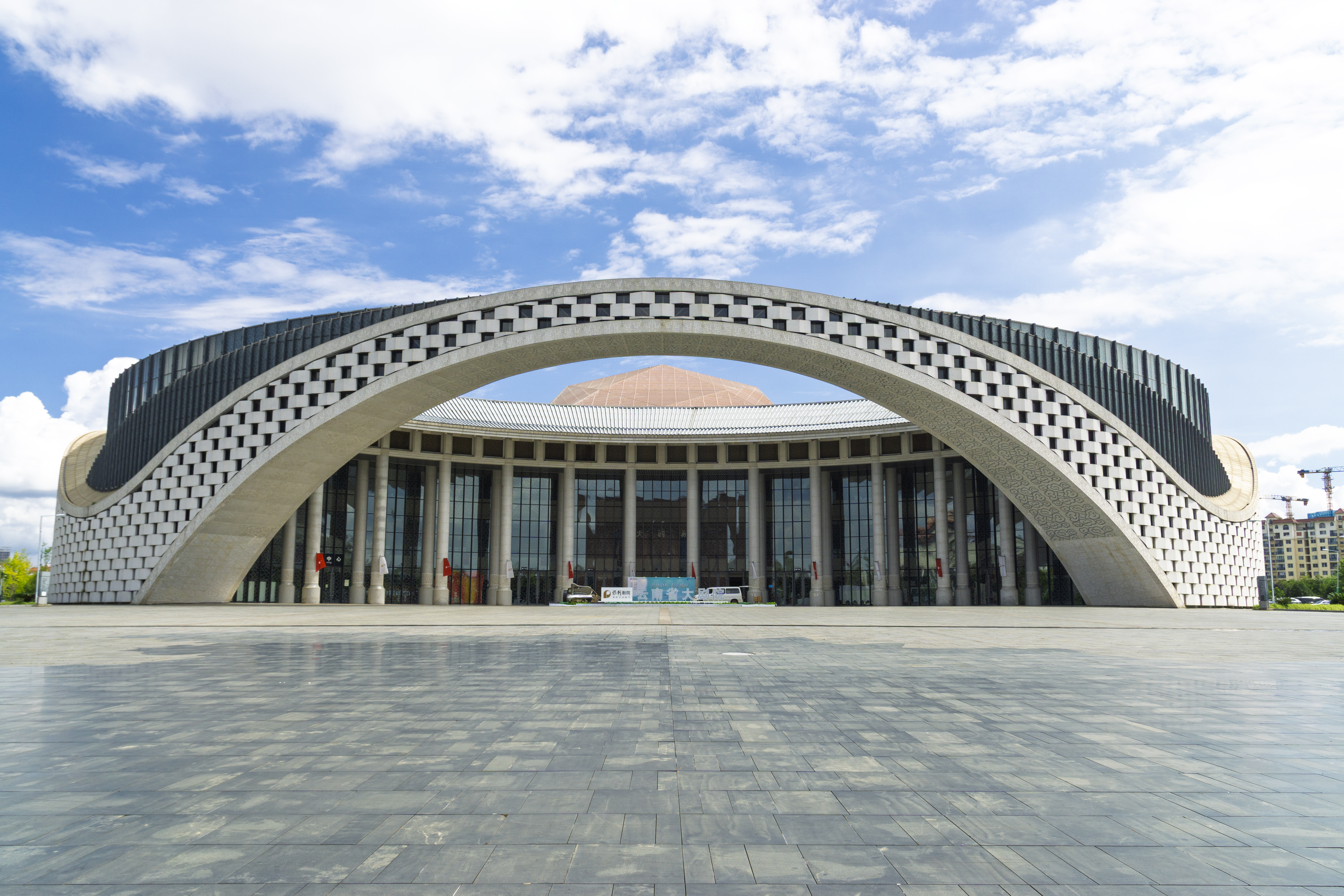
Yunnan Grand Theater

=== Leisure and entertainment ===
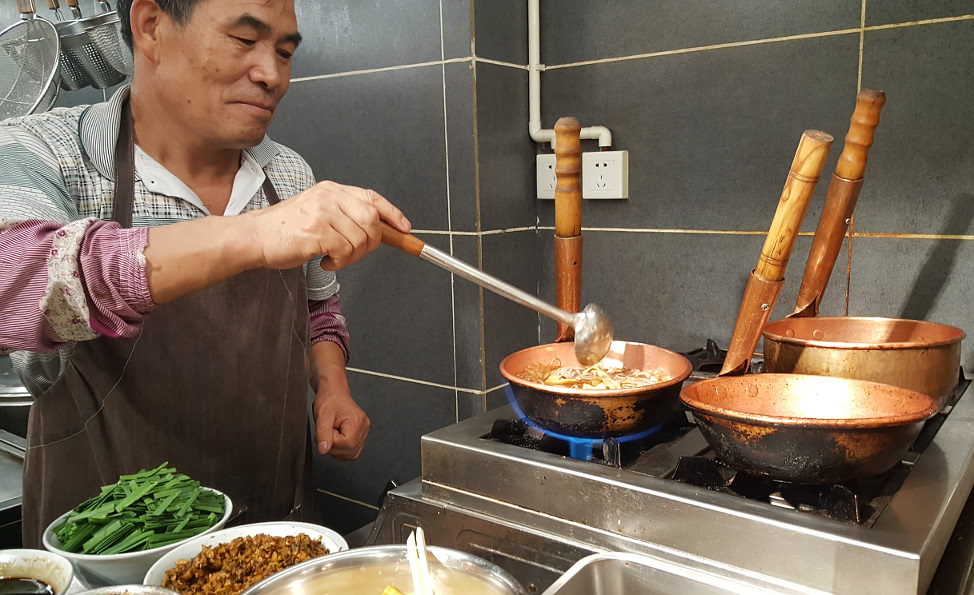
Mixian (米线) rice noodles being cooked in copper pots (铜锅) on gas elements at a noodle restaurant in Kunming.

Within Kunming, the entertainment district has its focus around Kundu Square, with many cinemas, bars, clubs and restaurants. Food aside, one feature of less formal Yunnanese restaurants is that they often have a communal bamboo water pipe and tobacco for their customers. There are plenty of student bars and clubs. The city has several operatic troupes and indigenous entertainments which include huadeng, a lantern dance. Although indoor performances are lacking, there are often informal shows at the weekend outside the Workers' Cultural Hall and in Cuihu Park. There are similar shows at the Yunnan Arts Theater on Dongfeng Xi Lu. Kunming's main cinema house is on the south side of the Dongfeng Lu/Zhengyi Lu intersection. The other main multiplex, the XJS, at the junction of Wenlin Jie and Dongfeng Xi Lu.

=== Language ===
The Kunming dialect is very similar to that of Sichuan and Guizhou but uses the third tone much less than standard Chinese. Many terms are used only in Kunming dialect, such as "板扎" meaning 'terrific'.

The pronunciations of certain Chinese characters are very different from Mandarin Chinese. For example, "鱼 (fish)" would be pronounced as "yi" in Kunming dialect instead of "yu" in Mandarin Chinese; "街 (street)" would be pronounced as "gai" instead of "jie".

When someone speaks Mandarin Chinese with a strong Kunming accent, it'll be called Mapu (马普), short for Majie (马街, a place in Kunming) Mandarin Chinese. The Kunming Dialect is slowly dying due to it being 'informal' and is being replaced by Mandarin Chinese. Nevertheless, it is still spoken by a decent number of residents today, especially among older residents.

=== Tourism ===
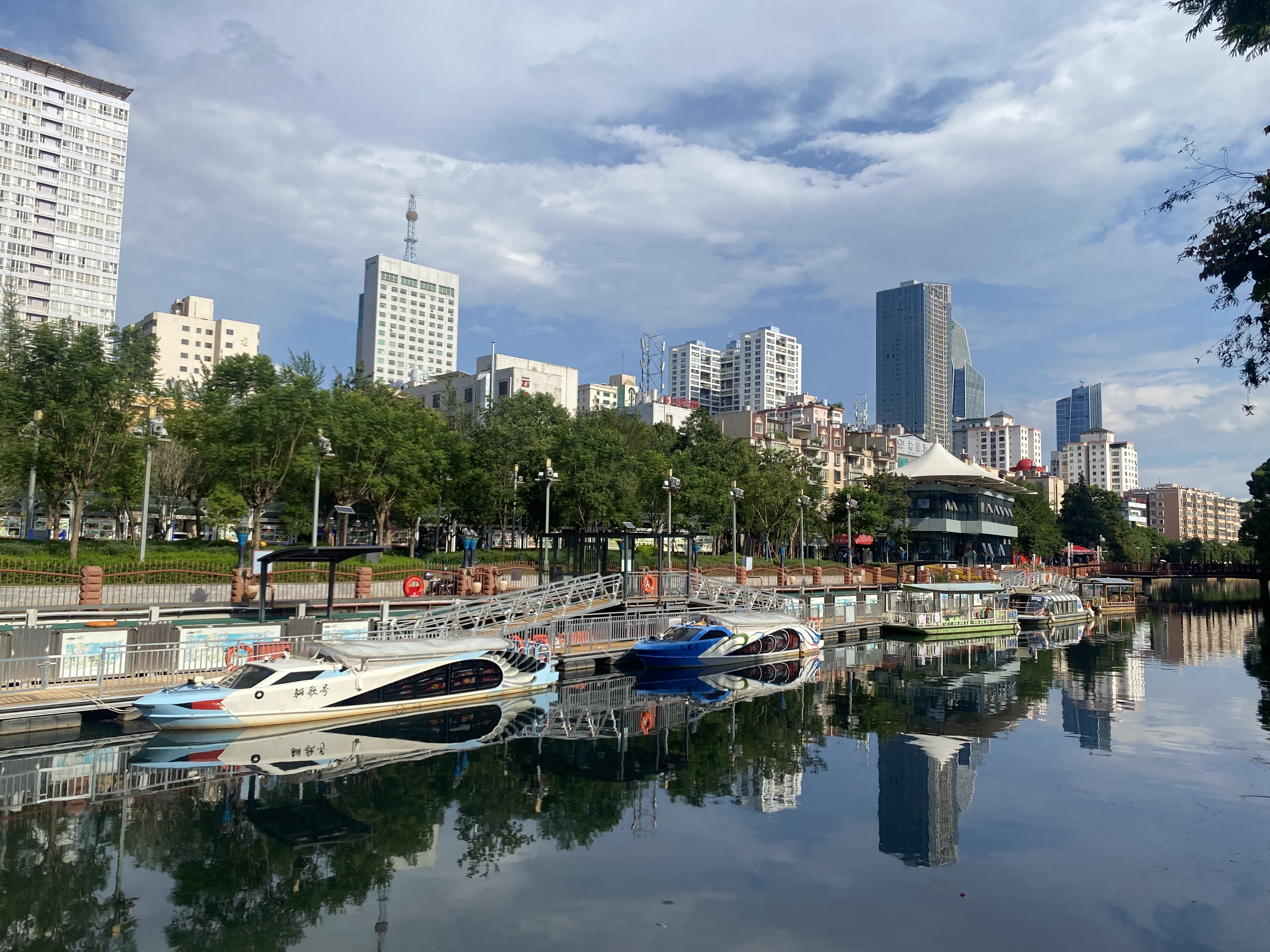
Panlong River

Kunming attracts domestic and foreign tourists year-round. At the center of Yunnan and as its capital, Kunming is also a transport hub for tourists heading to other parts of Yunnan such as Dali, Lijiang and Shangrila.

Conference and exhibition venues in Kunming include the Kunming International Convention and Exhibition Center and the Yunnan Provincial Science and Technology Hall.

Kingdom of the Little People, a theme park featuring performers with dwarfism, is also located near Kunming.

Other famous attractions include Stone Forest, Golden Temple Park, Yunnan Ethnic Village, and Jiuxiang Scenic Region.

=== Food ===
Kunming is an important center of Yunnan cuisine and is known for many local delicacies. These include:

- Flower Cakes, a special snack made from a variety of edible fresh flowers such as roses, chrysanthemums, and osmanthus.
- Yiliang Roast Duck, a local traditional dish from Yiliang County, recently incorporated into Kunming's jurisdiction, renowned for its crispy skin, tender meat, bright red color, and fragrant aroma.
- Steamed Chicken in a Clay Pot, a famous specialty dish from Yunnan Province, named for the method of steaming it in a clay pot. Chicken is the main ingredient, combined with seasonings and spices. The traditional recipe also produces an exceptionally valued chicken broth.
- Guandu Baba: A traditional snack from the Guandu District. It is a form of bread with unique production process and mellow taste and is a major part of the local food culture.
- Pu'er tea: Although produced in southern Yunnan, Kunming serves as a major aging, trading, and auction center for the tea. The city hosts annual tea expos and maintains specialized warehouses, continuing its historical role as a key terminus of the ancient Tea Horse Road.

== Sports ==
Every year, many Chinese and international athletes come to Kunming for high-altitude training. The city has been China's national high-elevation training base for more than 30 years. There are two major training complexes, Hongta Sports Center and Haigeng National Training Center.

Hongta Sports Center was built in 2000 by Hongta (Red Pagoda) cigarette company, at a cost of US$58 million. Located near Haigeng Park, the complex is mostly used by professional athletes, but also acts as a sports club for the general public. Every weekend, it hosts amateur football matches. Aside from about 10 football pitches, including one surrounded by a running track, Hongta also has a 50-metre (160-foot) swimming pool, a badminton gymnasium, tennis courts and a basketball court. It also has one of China's few ice hockey rinks, and a workout room with treadmills and weightlifting machines. There are also game rooms for air hockey; also pool tables and a basement bowling alley. The complex comes complete with a 101-room hotel and restaurant.

Haigeng National Training Center is located ten minutes away from Hongta on Dianchi (Lake Dian) near Kunming's award-winning Lakeview Golf Club and new condominium developments. This complex dates from the late 1970s and was built by the government specifically to specialize in high-altitude training.

=== Golf ===
Golf is a major attraction in Kunming. There are four golf courses within an hour's drive of downtown. For the last six years, Spring City Golf and Lake Resort in nearby Yiliang County has reigned as the best golf course in China and Hong Kong according to US Golf Digest. In 2004, it was named Asia's best golf resort by Asian Golf Monthly. It hosts the Kunming Leg of the Omega China Tour.

Kunming has attracted foreign investment in golf course development. "Spring City" Golf Resort is a US$600 million project that began as an investment led by Singapore's Keppel Land Group in 1992. Jack Nicklaus and course designer Robert Trent Jones, Jr designed the two courses.

=== Sport facilities ===
Major sports facilities include:

- Tuodong Sports Center, a multi-purpose venue
- Golf: Spring City Golf and Lake Resort, its 'Mountain Course' was designed by Jack Nicklaus
- Lakeview Golf Villa
- Cuihu Park tennis courts
- Kunming Municipal Athletic Center
- Kunming Gymnasium
- Yunnan Provincial Stadium, home to Hongta Yunnan Football Club
- Wuhua District Stadium

== Economy ==
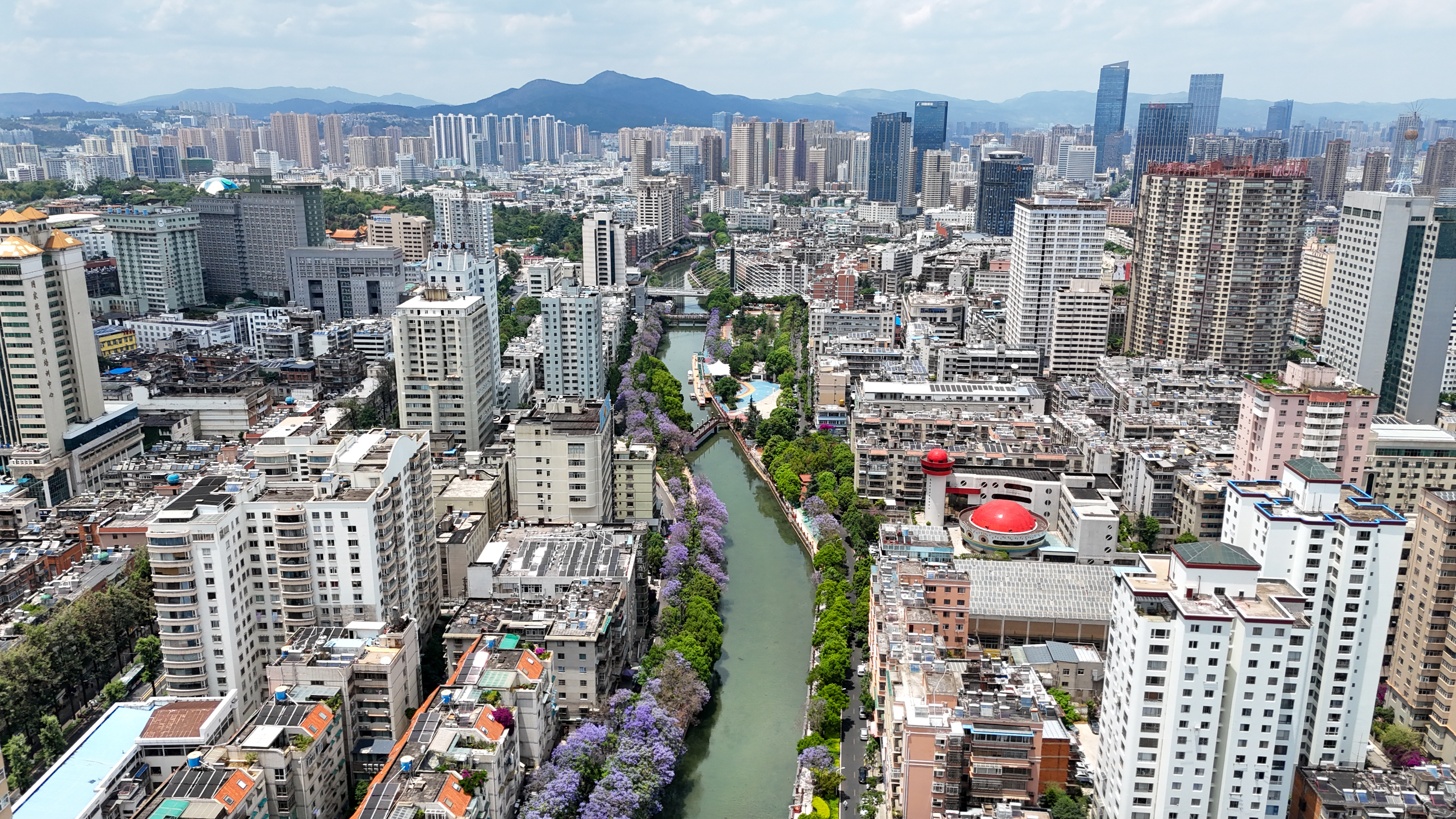
Aerial view of Kunming in May 2025

Kunming has three economic advantages over other cities in southwest China: significant natural resources, a large consumer market and a mild climate. Due to its position at the center of Yunnan, one of China's largest producers of agricultural products, minerals and hydroelectricity, Kunming is the main commercial hub for most of the province's resources.

Kunming's chief industries are copper, lead and zinc production. Its iron and steel industry has been expanded. Salt and phosphate mines around Kunming are some of the largest in China. Yunnan Copper Company Limited, based in Kunming, is one of Yunnan's largest mining corporations. From the late 1970s, Kunming's main industries also came to include food and tobacco processing and the manufacture of construction equipment and machines.

In May 1995, the State Council approved Kunming as an Open City. By the end of 1995, the city had approved 929 overseas-funded enterprises with a total investment of $2.3 billion including $1.1 billion of foreign capital. More than 40 projects each had an investment of more than $9 million.

Kunming is a center of engineering and the manufacture of machine tools, electrical machinery, equipment and automobiles (including heavy goods vehicles). It has a chemical industry, and plastics, cement works and textile factories. Its processing plants, which include tanneries, woodworking and papermaking factories, use local agricultural products. In 1997, Yunnan Tire Co. opened a tire plant in Kunming, with a capacity to produce two million tires per year.

=== Development zones ===
Kunming has two major development zones, Kunming High-tech Industrial Development Zone (biological medicine, new materials, electronic information, agriculture) and Kunming Economic and Technology Development Zone (mechanical equipment production, biological science and food industry, information industry, software).

There are also 30 key industrial parks promulgated and recognized by National Development and Reform Commission in Yunnan Province. The largest include:

- Chenggong Industrial Park
- Anning Industrial Park
- Songming Yanglin Industrial Development Zone
- Dongchuan Special Industrial Park
- Xundian Special Industrial Park
- Kunming Haikou Industrial Park.

=== Companies ===
As of 2008, Kunming is home to 65 of the Top 100 Enterprises in Yunnan Province. The top 100 enterprises were based on their revenues for 2007. Hongta Group, with revenues of some RMB39.88 billion for 2007 topped the list. The tobacco sector remains the largest sector in the province.

=== Horticulture ===
Kunming is a significant horticultural center in China, providing products such as grain, wheat, horsebeans, corn, potato and fruit such as peaches, apples, oranges, grapes and chestnuts. Kunming has 2,585 hectares (6,390 acres) of lawns, trees and flowers, averaging 4.96 square metres (53.4 square feet) per capita and a green space rate of 21.7 percent.

Kunming is world-famous for its flowers and flower-growing exports. More than 400 types of flowers are commonly grown in Kunming, and flowers are a major industry in the city. The camellia, Yulan magnolia, azalea, fairy primrose, lily and orchid are known as the six famous flowers of the city. The camellia was confirmed by the Municipality of Kunming as its city flower in 1983. Yunnan has developed into the largest flower export base in Asia, with many Dutch experts having transferred technology to the area. The Dounan Flower Market, located in suburban Kunming, is the largest in China with daily sales of 2.5 million yuan (US$300,000) from the 2 million sprays of flowers (as of 2006). The provincial government agency, the Yunnan Flower Association, regulates the industry. To support this production, Kunming utilizes cold-chain logistics centered around the Kunming Changshui International Airport and dedicated railway freight services. This infrastructure facilitates the export of flowers to various international markets, making the city a major distribution center for the Asian floriculture industry.

Kunming also hosts a specialized Flower Gene Editing Breeding Center. Utilizing CRISPR gene-editing technology, the center develops new flower varieties with enhanced traits such as novel colors, extended bloom periods, and improved disease resistance, strengthening the local floriculture industry's competitiveness.

The Kunming city government planned, as of 2008, to create an environmental trial court to deal with environment-related lawsuits. It is to be part of the city's intermediate people's court and will have jurisdiction over appeals by companies that have been found guilty of violating environmental laws in cities throughout Yunnan.

=== Natural resources ===
Kunming has historically been a major mining city in the region. Mineral resources include phosphorus, salt, magnesium, titanium, coal, quartz sand, clay, silica, and copper. Phosphorus and salt mines are the most plentiful. Kunyang Phosphorus Mine is one of the three major phosphorus mines in the country. Rock salt reserves are 1.222 billion tonnes (1.203 billion long tons; 1.347 billion short tons) and mirabilite reserves are 1.908 billion tonnes (1.878 billion long tons; 2.103 billion short tons). Dongchuan is a major copper production base.

Proven reserves of coal bed gas is about 500 billion cubic metres (18,000 billion cubic feet), equal to 720 million tonnes (710 million long tons; 790 million short tons) of standard coal. Geothermal resources are widely distributed.

=== Logistics ===
Kunming East Station is at present Yunnan province's only container handling depot, with direct links to only three provinces; Guangdong, Guizhou and Sichuan. It also has direct access to the metropolitan district of Chongqing.

The Jiaying Depot is connected with the new system of highways built linking Yunnan to the markets of Southeast Asia, facilitating Chinese exports to the region and granting resource-poor China greater access to the region's massive raw material resources. Yunnan has thereby become a progressively important area in the Southwest's rail logistics both in terms of national and international logistics.

Historically, the Kunming-Haiphong Railway to Haiphong in north Vietnam (part of French Indochina) made Kunming a major logistics hub, although the historical railway is no longer in major use. Following the inauguration of the China–Laos Railway in 2021, Kunming has served as a cargo distribution center for the route. The city's logistics parks facilitate the cross-border transport of agricultural products, electronics, and e-commerce goods to Southeast Asian markets.

=== Energy ===
In July 2008, Kunming began to implement a program to transform the city's solar energy industry into a US$8.8 billion industrial base in China by 2013. Kunming receives an annual average sunshine of more than 2,400 hours.

As of 2007, the Kunming Economic Committee listed about 130 solar energy enterprises in the city. Of these, 118 enterprises produce solar lamps and solar water heaters, with a combined total production value of about US$43.8 million, and 10 enterprises are engaged in solar photovoltaic cells manufacturing, with a total production value of about US$51.2 million.

Suntech Power announced in December 2008 that it was jointly constructing a solar energy project with Yunnan Provincial Power Investment and other investors. The 1MW first-phase of the Shilin 66MW on-grid solar power station began generating power on 28 December 2009. The initial phase of the 66MW project was originally scheduled to start production in first half of 2010 while the 20MW second phase and 36 MW third phase were under construction.

== Transport ==
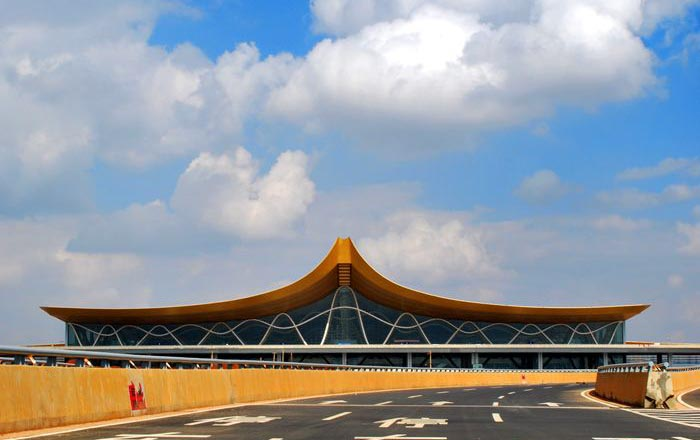
Kunming Changshui International Airport

Kunming is situated on the Yunnan–Guizhou Plateau. Rail and air are the main two methods to travel to or from Kunming from outside Yunnan.

=== Air transport ===
Kunming has air connections with several Chinese and Southeast Asian cities. Kunming is served by Kunming Changshui International Airport (KMG), which opened in June 2012, replacing the older international airport, which was located 4–5 km (2.5–3.1 mi) southeast of central Kunming.

The now defunct Yunnan Airlines was headquartered in Kunming until it was acquired by China Eastern Airlines. China Southwest Airlines used to operate routes to and from Kunming, until it was merged with Air China.

Lucky Air is a budget airline based in Kunming and operates scheduled services from Dali to Kunming and Xishuangbanna, and plans to expand to other areas of China.

Currently, the longest non-stop flight from Kunming is to Dubai International in the UAE, operated by China Eastern Airlines.

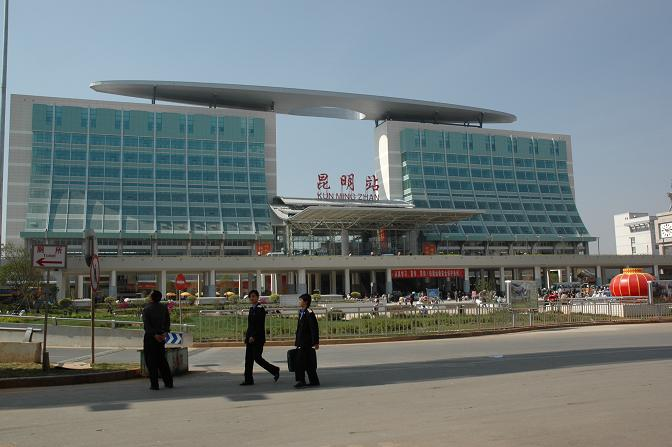
Kunming's main railway station

=== Rail ===
Kunming is the main rail hub of Yunnan province. The Chengdu–Kunming railway from Sichuan, Shanghai–Kunming railway from Guizhou, and Nanning–Kunming railway from Guangxi converge in Kunming from the north, northeast and east. The Yunnan–Vietnam Railway runs from Kunming southeast to Hekou and Lao Cai on the Sino-Vietnamese border and then on to Haiphong The Kunming–Yuxi railway runs south to Yuxi, where a second rail line to Vietnam is being planned and built. To the west of Kunming, the Guangtong–Dali railway extends off the Chengdu–Kunming Line to Dali (Xiaguan Town).

Kunming has three major railway stations:

- Kunming railway station is at the southern end of Beijing Xi Lu. Compared with the other railway station (North Railway Station), Kunming Railway Station services most of the "conventional" (not high-speed) trains to places to other provinces of China. Trains run north to Chengdu, southeast via Xingyi to Baise and Nanning in Guangxi, and east through Guizhou, via Liupanshui, Anshun, Guiyang, into the rest of the country.
- Kunming South railway station, opened at the end of 2016, is located in Chenggong District, many miles southeast from the historical city center. It is the western terminal of the Shanghai–Kunming high-speed railway and the Guangzhou–Nanning–Kunming high-speed railway, and has high-speed service to destinations along these lines and elsewhere on the nation's high-speed network.
- Kunming North railway station (serviced by the No. 23 Bus) is on the heritage 1,000 mm (3 ft 3 3/8 in) metre gauge Kunming–Hai Phong Railway, which runs to Hekou and Vietnam. Most of the station has been converted into a museum. Due to the deterioration of the railway line, the long distance narrow-gauge service has been cancelled; however, as of 2012, some local narrow gauge service still operates at Kunming North Railway Station, in particular two daily trains to Shizui (石咀) Station on the western outskirts of Kunming, and to Wangjiaying (王家营) east of the city.

As of 2017, railway development projects continue to proceed in the Kunming metropolitan area. In February 2017, the railway authorities announced that a connector between the new Kunming South railway station and the old Kunming railway station (also known as the Nanyao Station; 南窑火车站) will open by the end of 2017, making it possible for some high-speed train to serve Kunming railway station as well.

==== Urban rail system ====
In May 2010, Kunming began construction on its first urban rail lines, line 1 and 2 of the Kunming Metro. An elevated test section had been under construction since 2009. Parts of Line 1 and Line 2 opened in April 2014. Construction on Line 3 began in August 2010 and Phase 1 was completed in 2018. The entire system so far consists of 6 lines with a total length of about 164 kilometres (102 miles).

Map of the Kunming Metro

==== High-speed rail ====
Kunming serves as a major node for domestic high-speed rail in Southwestern China, and along with Nanning handles virtually all rail connections between China and Southeast Asia.

Kunming will be the hub and Northern terminus for the "Pan Asia High Speed Network", an interconnected high-speed rail system linking China, Cambodia, Laos, Myanmar, Thailand, Malaysia and Singapore.

Active high-speed or higher-speed railways serving Kunming:

1. Kunming–Shanghai. Construction completed for this line on 16 June 2016, and it was opened 28 December 2016 in combination with Kunming South railway station. It connects a huge portion of Southern China, going through 6 provincial capital cities (Shanghai, Hangzhou, Nanchang, Changsha, Guiyang and Kunming) and is one of the "Eight Horizontals and Eight Verticals" of the Chinese HSR system. The overall length is 2,266 kilometres (1,408 miles). Trains on this line take approximately 9 hours from Shanghai to Kunming. The maximum speed is 350 km/h, but it is slower in many sections due to mountainous terrain.
2. Kunming–Nanning. Opened 28 December 2016 in combination with Kunming South railway station. The maximum speed is 250 km/h (160 mph), although it is slower in many sections due to mountainous terrain. This line connects the capitals of Yunnan and Guangxi, serving as a key link in Southwestern China and a feeder for rail lines to Southeast Asia.
3. Kunming–Chengdu. An upgrade to the existing low-speed railway completed in 2022. It runs at 200 km/h (120 mph), which by some criteria can be considered high-speed rail. This railway is a critical corridor connecting Yunnan to the economically more prosperous Sichuan Basin.
4. Several higher-speed intercity rail routes within Yunnan. These lines use mostly Fuxing CR200J trains and run at a maximum speed of 200 km/h, frequently slowing down further in areas with extra-difficult terrain.
  1. The Western Yunnan rail lines, of which the main branch is called the Guangtong–Chuxiong–Dali railway. Service on that line runs through Chuxiong and Dali to Pupiao in Baoshan; construction is still ongoing for further extensions of the line towards Dehong and Ruili. An extension into Myanmar is possible in the future but unlikely until armed conflict there ends. Branch lines extend from Dali both north to Lijiang and Shangri-La and south to Lincang, with these lines often served by trains from Kunming as well.
  2. The Southern Yunnan rail lines, of which the main branch is called the Yuxi–Mohan railway. Service on that line runs through Yuxi and Puer to Xishuangbanna; in addition, due to the recent construction of a high-speed extension into Laos, many services from Kunming on this route run all the way to Vientiane through the Mohan border crossing.
  3. The Southeastern Yunnan rail lines, of which the main branch is called the Mile–Mengzi high-speed railway. Services on the Southeastern routes are more widely distributed than the others, but roughly run through Yuxi or Mile towards settlements in and around Honghe Prefecture, with some services going all the way to Hekou. An extension into Vietnam is possible in the future.

Construction is underway for the following high-speed railways:

1. Kunming–Chongqing. The speed will be 350 km/h (220 mph). Construction on this line is nearing completion, and services are expected to begin relatively soon.
2. Kunming–Singapore railway, also known as the Pan-Asian Railway, will connect Kunming and Singapore through a series of high-speed rail lines fanning out across all of mainland Southeast Asia, connecting China to the entire region.

Study or planning is being done for the following railways:

1. Kunming to Kolkata, India via Myanmar.
2. Kunming to Kyaukphyu, Myanmar.

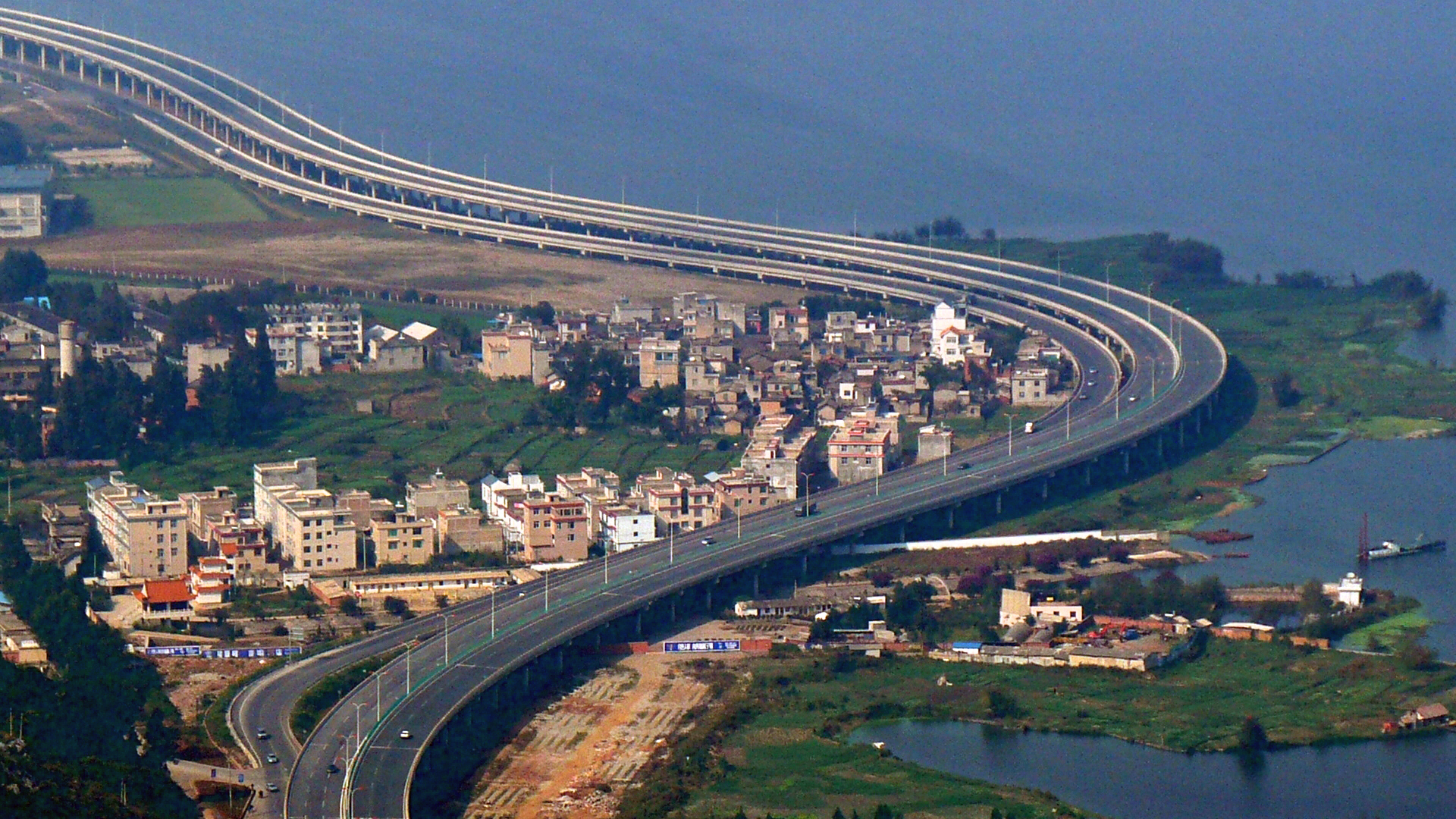
A highway in Xishan, Kunming

=== Road transit ===
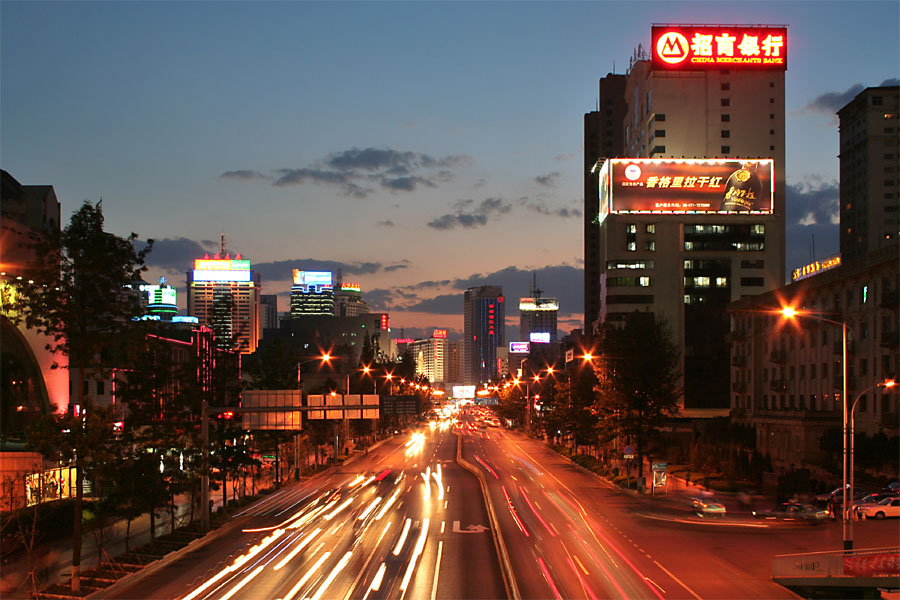
Dongfeng Road, one of Kunming's main arteries.

Yunnan has built a comprehensive highway system with roads reaching almost all the major cities or towns in the region. Bus travel across the region is extensive. Buses head from Kunming to destinations such as Dali and Lijiang several times a day. China National Highways 108, 213 and 320 intersect in Kunming. Highways link Kunming to Thailand, Vietnam and Laos, and provide Yunnan province access to seaports of Southeast Asia.

The Kunming–Bangkok Expressway is the first expressway from China to Bangkok via Laos. The 1,800 km (1,100 mi) long Kunming–Bangkok Expressway begins at Kunming going down to Ban Houayxay in Laos; it then crosses the Mekong River to Chiangkhong in Thailand and eventually reaches Bangkok.

Leaving China by road into Vietnam and Laos is also possible through the respective crossings at Hekou in southeastern Yunnan or Bianmao Zhan in Xishuangbanna.

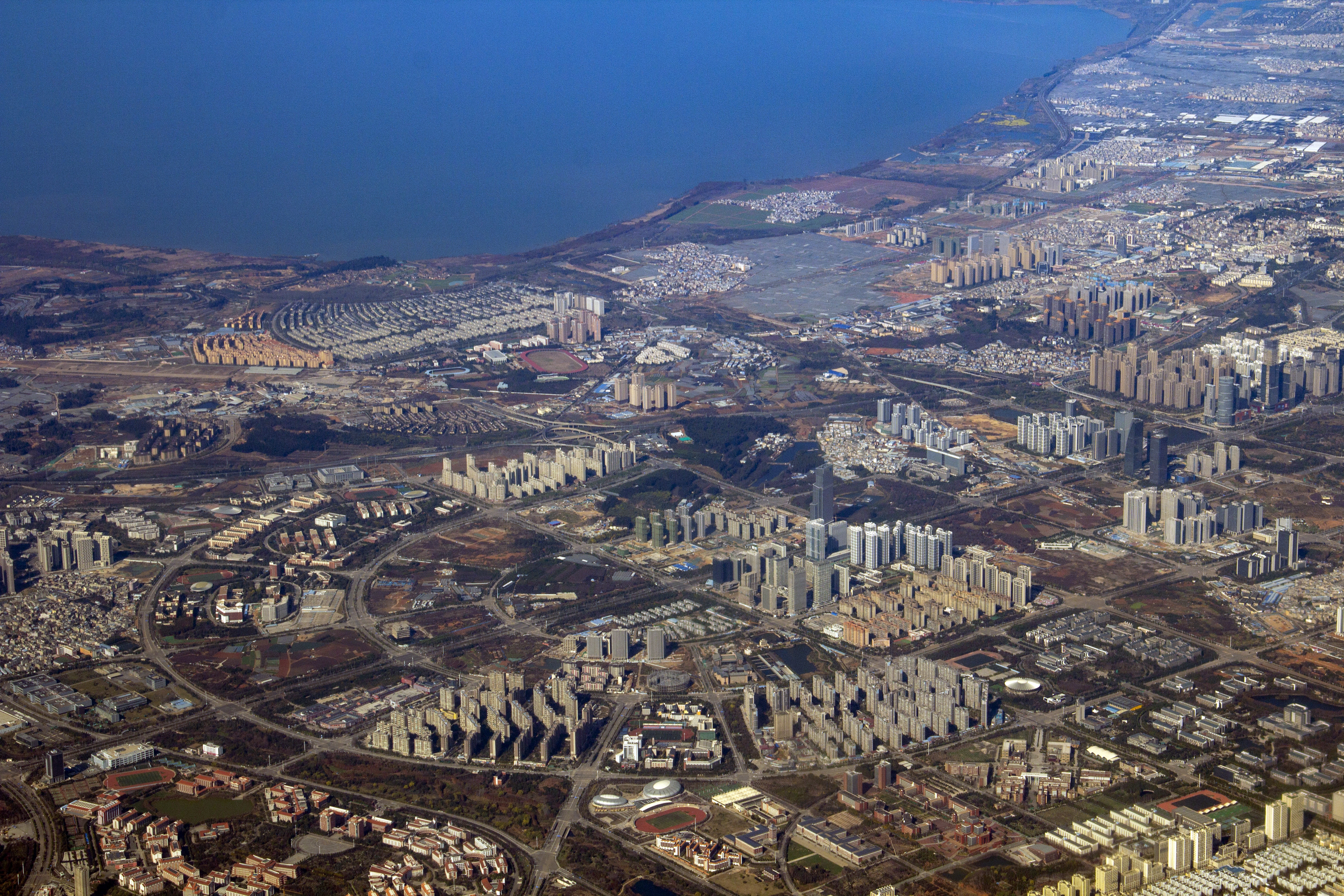
Aerial view of Chenggong District in 2022

The road network of the city itself has several major thoroughfares. Beijing Road and Fubao/Qingnian/Longquan Road form the north–south axis. Beijing Road passes just east of the city center as it runs for 5 km (3.1 mi) between the city's north end and main station, while Longquan Road runs from the northern end of the city west of Beijing Road into the City Center, where it becomes Qingnian Road, and continues further south as Fubao Road to Dian Lake. Renmin Road (People's Road) and Dongfeng Road form the east-west axis. Dongfeng Road runs through the southern end of the city center, through the main commercial district, with many hotels and foreign consulates being located on it. Renmin Road stretches all the way from the Western Hills to Changshui Airport, cutting straight through the city center on the way. The far west end was formerly the first leg of the Burma Road.

Circling the city is three ring roads, the inner Huancheng Road (City Ring Road), the highway ring road Erhuan (Second Ring Expressway), and the incomplete Sanhuan (Third Ring Road) which consists of several sections of highways and regular roads with different names. The Third Ring lacks a section on its south. The new Chenggong District is planned around its main thoroughfare, the north-south Caiyun Road, which also continues north and goes just south of the city center as a major east-west road called Jinbi Road.

There are also four major long-distance bus stations in Kunming with the South Bus Station and Railway Square Bus Station being the primary ones.

- South Bus Station is located right by Kunming Railway Station, with standard, luxury, express and sleeper buses departing for all over Yunnan and neighboring provinces.
- Railway Square Bus Station is smaller than the SBS and the majority of the buses that depart from the station are private-run. Usually no fixed schedules are available and buses will leave when they are full. There are standard and sleeper services to Dali, Jinghong and elsewhere in Yunnan.

== Education and research ==
Kunming remains a major educational and cultural center in the southwest region of China, with universities, medical and teacher-training colleges, technical schools, and scientific research institutes. As of 2024, it was listed among the top 100 cities in the world by scientific research output.

=== Colleges and universities ===
- Kunming Medical University
- Kunming Metallurgy College
- Kunming University
- Kunming University of Science and Technology (1925)
- Southwest Forestry University
- Yunnan Agricultural University
- Yunnan Arts University
- Yunnan Normal University
- Yunnan Normal University Business School
- Yunnan University (1922)
- Yunnan University of Finance and Economics
- Yunnan Nationalities University
- Yunnan University of Traditional Chinese Medicine

==== Yunnan University ====
Yunnan University (云南大学), located in Kunming, is one of the largest and the most prestigious universities in China and is the only university in Yunnan province which has been developed into a "National Key University". It was founded in 1922, as "University of the Eastern Land". Its name has been changed six times subsequently. The institution has 17 schools on the local campus and 3 independent schools located in other cities. It claims the largest and best law school in Yunnan province.

==== Yunnan Normal University ====
Yunnan Normal University (云南师范大学) was founded in 1938 as the National Normal College of Southwestern Union University. In 1946, when some faculties returned to the north of China, it changed its name to National Kunming Normal College. It now as 6 campuses in Kunming itself and other cities. With 22 schools, it has an enrollment of some 33000 undergraduate students.

==== Kunming University of Science and Technology ====
Kunming University of Science and Technology (昆明理工大学) was established in 1954 and was given "key university" status in 2010. In 2017, it had 3 campuses in Kunming housing 24 schools and had an enrollment of 27000 undergraduates.

==== Yunnan Nationalities University ====
Yunnan Nationalities University was founded in 1951 as Yunnan Nationalities College. It is now one of six "key" universities in the province. It has established cooperative relations with 26 foreign universities including University of Bergen in Norway, La Trobe University in Australia, and University of Virginia in the United States. The university has a Nationalities Museum, which contains more than 20000 rare exhibits. There are more than 23000 undergraduates on campus.

==== Huayang Academy ====
Huayang Academy is a specialist Chinese language training centre considered unique for offering training Kunming dialect as well as standard Mandarin. Its locality is a popular centre of Western culture in Kunming, attracting numerous foreign-owned businesses.

=== Management training ===
The Shanghai-based China Europe International Business School, aka CEIBS, will launch in 2009 its Business Development Certificate Programme in Kunming. With the Business Development Certificate Programme, CEIBS and program partner Frankfurt School of Finance & Management aim to train approximately 500 Chinese managers in the coming four years, with the first phase of the program beginning in 2008 in Hefei, the capital of Anhui province. Kunming and Harbin will be the focus of the program's expansion in 2009. The program is part of a two million Euro umbrella project funded by the EU, which also includes another program that provides scholarships for MBA students from China's less-developed regions.

=== Research institutes ===
- Solar Energy Research Institute of Yunnan Normal University
- Kunming Municipal Planning and Design Research Institute

==== Chinese Academy of Sciences ====
The Kunming Branch of the Chinese Academy of Sciences (CAS) was established in 1957. It was formerly known as Kunming Office of CAS and was promoted and renamed into a branch in 1958. In 1962, Yunnan Branch combined with Sichuan Branch and Guizhou Branch to establish Southwest China Branch of CAS in Chengdu. In October 1978, Kunming Branch was reestablished at the approval of the State Council.

As a working department of CAS, Kunming Branch now administers five research institutes:

- Kunming Institute of Botany, Chinese Academy of Sciences
- Kunming Institute of Medical Biology, Chinese Academy of Sciences
- Kunming Institute of Zoology, Chinese Academy of Sciences
- Kunming Primate Research Center, Chinese Academy of Sciences
- Xishuangbanna Tropical Botanical Gardens in Menglun, Mengla County, Xishuangbanna Dai Autonomous Prefecture, far southern Yunnan.

At present, it has a total staff of 1,160, of whom 808 are professional researchers, seven are academicians and 343 are senior researchers. There are also 447 PhD degree students and 530 master's degree students. The retired staff is 1,090. The Branch has set up three national key open labs, two CAS key open labs, five key labs set up by CAS and local province, three engineering centers, five doctoral sites, five post doctoral stations and national famous plant herbariums and halls of wildlife specimens and has a series of up-to-date research instruments and apparatus, computer networks and biodiversity information systems. The Branch has become an advanced comprehensive science research base in astronomy, geology and biology.

=== Libraries ===
- Yunnan Provincial Library

== Twin towns and sister cities ==
Kunming currently maintains sister city agreements with the following foreign cities.

City	Region	Country	Date
Fujisawa	Kanagawa	Japan	1981-01-15
Zürich	Zürich	Switzerland	1982-02-17
Chefchaouen	Tanger-Tetouan-Al Hoceima	Morocco	1985-05-14
Denver	Colorado	United States	1986-05-15
Wagga Wagga	New South Wales	Australia	1988-08-14
Cochabamba	Cochabamba	Bolivia	1997-09-25
Chiang Mai	Chiang Mai	Thailand	1999-06-07
Mandalay	Mandalay	Myanmar	2001-05-10
New Plymouth	Taranaki	New Zealand	2003-08-11
Chittagong	Chittagong	Bangladesh	2005-08-18
Jyväskylä	Central Finland	Finland	2008-09-18
Yangon	Yangon	Myanmar	2008-12-01
Phnom Penh	–	Cambodia	2011-06-08
Polonnaruwa	North Central Province	Sri Lanka	2011-07-27
Vientiane	Vientiane	Laos	2011-10-17
Kuching	Sarawak	Malaysia	2012-04-19
Antalya	Antalya	Turkey	2013-05-10
Pokhara	Gandaki Province	Nepal	2013-07-08
Kolkata	West Bengal	India	2013-10-23
Schenectady	New York	United States	2014-03-25
Da Nang	–	Vietnam	2015-02-06
Grasse	Alpes-Maritimes	France	2016-03-27
Olomouc	Olomouc	Czech Republic	2017-09-11
Dietzenbach	Hessen	Germany	2020-02-14

In April 2020, Wagga Wagga's city council voted to cut sister city ties with Kunming. A week later, the city council voted again and restored the sister city relationship.

== Health ==
Currently, there are 2,774 medical institutes of various kinds and 33,600 medical professionals in the city. The 170 medical service institutes based on communities cover a population of 1.86 million. China Health Management Corp (CNHC) is the main private healthcare provider in the city. It has been predicted that private hospitals will provide 70 percent of total medical health care services by 2012 within Kunming City.

Hospitals in Kunming include:

- Yunnan Provincial Red Cross Hospital and Emergency Center, is the main general hospital in Kunming.
- Yunnan Provincial First People's Hospital
- First Affiliated Hospital of Kunming Medical College
- Kunming Mental Hospital, founded in 1955, houses over 400 patients.
- Kunming Physical Rehabilitation Center

=== HIV/AIDS ===
In late 2006, China's first provincial-level HIV/AIDS treatment center was built. The US$17.5 million center is located 28 km (17 mi) from downtown Kunming. The center has six main departments: clinical treatment, technical consulting, research and development, international exchange and cooperation, clinical treatment training and psychological therapy.

Yunnan, with a population of more than 45 million, leads China in HIV/AIDS infections: primarily spread through intravenous drug use and unsafe sex, often involving the sex industry. According to official statistics, by the end of 2005, Yunnan was home to more than 48,000 HIV-infected patients, 3,900 patients with AIDS and a death toll of 1,768.

== Military ==
Kunming is the headquarters of the 75th Group Army.

== Public security and crime ==
The headquarters of the Kunming Municipal Public Security Bureau is on Beijing Lu. Its foreign affairs department, located on Jinxing Huayuan, Jinxing Xiao Lu in the northeast of the city, handles immigration and travel visas.

=== Drug trafficking ===
Kunming has a pivotal role as a major conduit point in international drug trafficking as it is the closest major Chinese city to the Golden Triangle in Southeast Asia. The Kunming Municipal Public Security Bureau Narcotics Squad is the specialist counter-narcotics police service.

Police confiscated at least three tons of drugs in Yunnan in 2005. Yunnan province seized 10 tons of illegal drugs in 2006, accounting for 80 percent of the total drugs confiscated nationwide during the period, according to Sun Dahong, then deputy director of Yunnan's provincial Public Security Bureau. The total is more than double the amount seized in the province in 2005.

Heroin and methamphetamine seem to be the main targets of the 30,000+ strong anti-drug police in Yunnan. The majority of heroin coming into China from the Golden Triangle passes through Dali from where it is then distributed to the rest of China and internationally via China's coastal cities.

Kunming Municipal Compulsory Rehabilitation Center in Kunming is the main rehabilitation center for drug addicts, mostly recovering from heroin addiction. International drug rings have used Yunnan and Kunming to channel new synthetic drugs (like methamphetamine) as well as traditional drugs like heroin.

== International relations ==
The following countries have a diplomatic mission in Kunming:

- Consulates:
  - Bangladesh
  - Cambodia
  - Myanmar (Burma)
  - Laos
  - Malaysia
  - Thailand
  - Vietnam
- Trade offices:
  - Australia
  - Netherlands

== Notable residents ==
Notable people from Kunming include:

- Benedict Anderson, scholar (born in Kunming)
- Cai Xitao, botanist
- Chih-Kung Jen, physicist
- Wang Xiji, aerospace engineer and recipient of the "Two Bombs, One Satellite" Meritorious Award
- Pierre Jean Marie Delavay, 19th-century French missionary, lived and died in Kunming
- Lamu Gatusa, professor and writer
- He Yunchang, Chinese performance artist born in Kunming whose early, seminal works were also performed there
- Li Weiwei, Olympics handball player
- Liu Fang, pipa player
- Maran Brang Seng, Burmese politician (died in Kunming)
- Ma Yashu, actress
- Nie Er, composer (born in Kunming)
- Frank Shu, Chinese-American astrophysicist, born in Kunming
- Xing Ruan, Chinese-Australian author and architect, born in Kunming
- Song Wencong, aerospace engineer and aircraft designer
- Tang Jiyao, general and warlord of Yunnan, died in Kunming
- Tong Yao, actress
- Tu Wei-ming, ethicist (born in Kunming)
- Wang Hongni, triathlete and Asian Games gold medallist
- Wen Yiduo, poet and scholar, (lived and assassinated in Kunming)
- Anthony Zee, physicist
- Zhang Xiaogang, artist, born in Kunming
- Zheng He, Ming dynasty explorer
- Zhu De, military leader (studied in Kunming)
- Zhu Youlang (Ming dynasty emperor), (fought and was executed in Kunming)

Diplomats:

- Auguste François, French consul in south China
- George Soulié de Morant, French diplomat
- John S. Service, American diplomat served in Kunming for two years

National Southwestern Associated University:

- Chen Ning Yang, physicist
- Chen Yinke, linguist
- Feng Youlan, philosopher
- Shiing-Shen Chern, mathematician
- Ta-You Wu, physicist
- Tsung-Dao Lee, physicist
- Wang Yuan, mathematician
- Wu Ningkun, professor emeritus
- Zhang Boling, founder of Nankai University

== See also ==
- 2008 Kunming bus bombings
- 3650 Kunming, an asteroid
- Category:Films set in Kunming
- Zheng He
- List of cities in the People's Republic of China
- List of twin towns and sister cities in China
