= Kunming City College =

For-profit private college in Kunming, Yunnan, China

- 昆明城市学院
- Other names: Shangyuan
- Established: 2000
- Location: Kunming, Yunnan, China
- Website: www.ynnubs.com/eng/ENG.htm

Kunming City College (昆明城市学院) is a for-profit private college in Kunming, Yunnan, China. The school is owned and managed by the private Kunming Boxin Technology Development Co., Ltd..

The school was previously known as Yunnan Normal University Business School (云南师范大学商学院), a private independent college.
