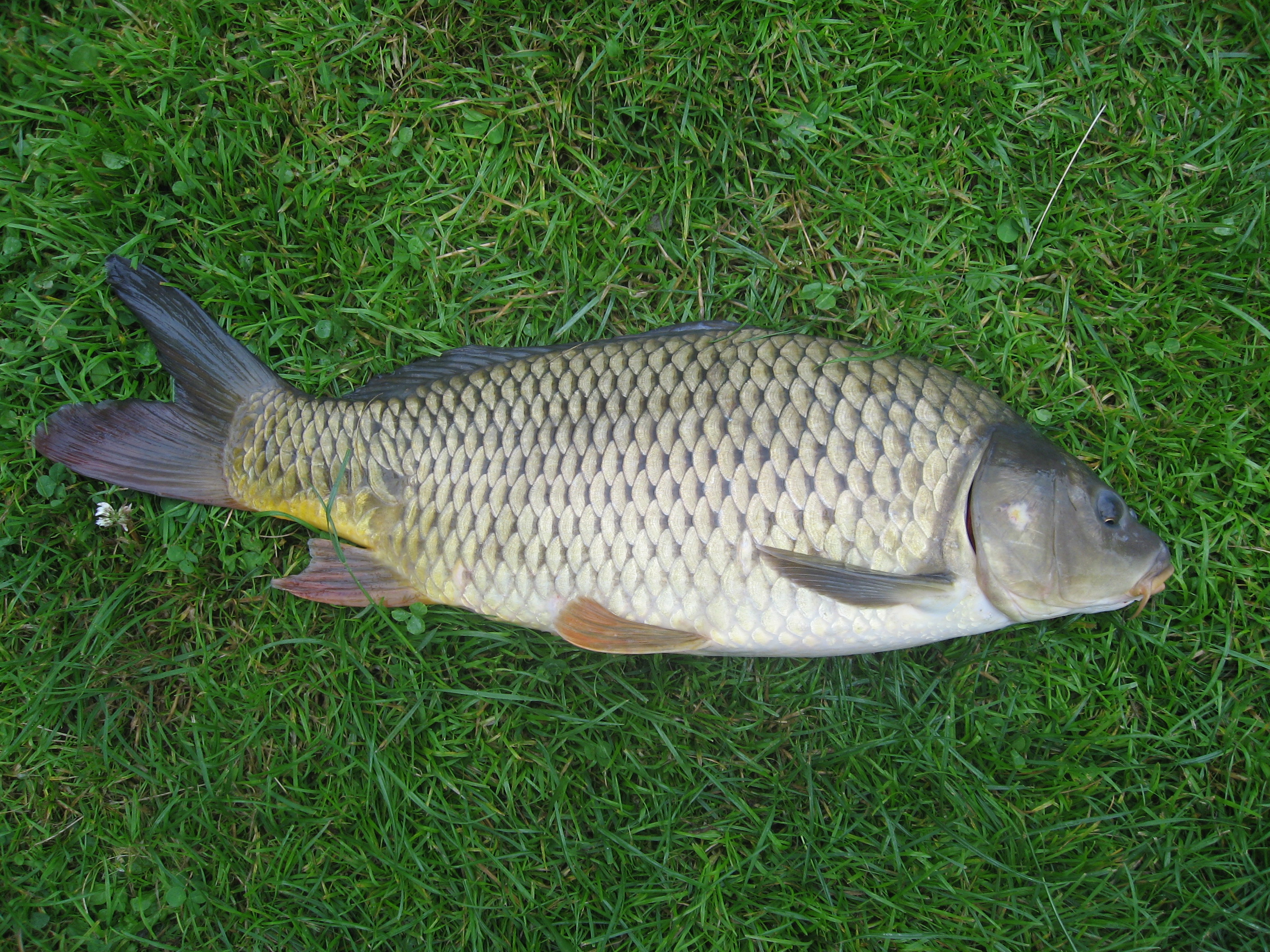
- Wild-type common carp (C. carpio)

Scientific classification
- Kingdom: Animalia
- Phylum: Chordata
- Class: Actinopterygii
- Division: Teleostei
- Order: Cypriniformes
- Family: Cyprinidae
- Subfamily: Cyprininae
- Genus: Cyprinus; Linnaeus, 1758

Type species
- Cyprinus carpio (Linnaeus, 1758)

Species
- 19 living species 5 possibly recently extinct 1 fossil

Synonyms
- Mesocyprinus Fang, 1936

= Cyprinus =

Typical carps Temporal range: Miocene–recent

Genus of fishes

Cyprinus /sɪˈpraɪnəs/ is the genus of typical carps in family Cyprinidae. Most species in the genus are of East Asia origin with only the common carp (C. carpio) in Western Asia and Europe; this invasive species has also been introduced to many other regions around the world. Cyprinus are closely related to some more barb-like genera, such as Cyclocheilichthys and Barbonymus (tinfoils). The crucian carps (Carassius) of western Eurasia, which include the goldfish (C. auratus), are apparently not as closely related.

This genus's most widespread and well-known member is the common carp (C. carpio) species complex. Although traditionally considered a single species, recent authorities have split the European and West Asian populations from the East Asian, with the latter named C. rubrofuscus (syn. C. carpio haematopterus). Members of the species complex are famed as a food fish and have been widely traded and introduced since antiquity, but in certain areas has multiplied inordinately and become a pest. In its long use it has been domesticated, and a number of breeds have been developed for food and other purposes. The koi (from Japanese nishikigoi, 錦鯉) are well-known carp breeds, selectively bred for being enjoyed by spectators from above. Strictly speaking, koi is simply the Japanese name of the East Asian carp.

The other species of typical carp are generally found in more restricted areas of eastern Asia, centered on the Yunnan region. In some cases, they are endemic to a single lake, most notably Lake Erhai, as well as Lake Dian, Fuxian Lake, Lake Jilu, Lake Qilihu, Lake Xingyun and Lake Yi-Lung, which are all in Yunnan proper. Several of these species are seriously threatened and five are possibly already extinct: C. yilongensis (Lake Yi-Lung), C. yunnanensis (Lake Qilihu), C. daliensis (Lake Erhai), C. megalophthalmus (Lake Erhai) and C. fuxianensis (Fuxian Lake).

== Species ==
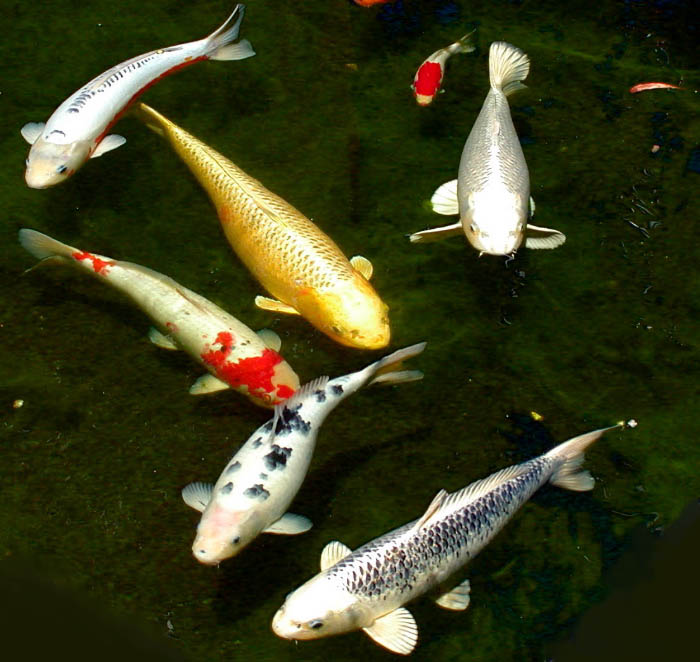
Japanese koi (ornamental domesticated carp) with various colors

The following species are currently recognized in the genus.

- Cyprinus acutidorsalis H. L. Chen & H. Q. Huang, 1977
- Cyprinus barbatus H. L. Chen & H. Q. Huang, 1977
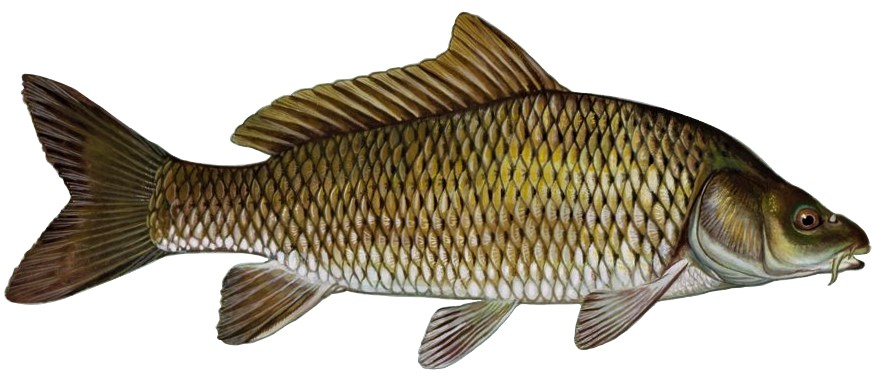
- Cyprinus carpio Linnaeus, 1758
- Cyprinus chilia H. W. Wu, G. R. Yang, P. Q. Yue & H. J. Huang, 1963
- Cyprinus dai (V. H. Nguyễn & L. H. Doan, 1969)
- Cyprinus daliensis H. L. Chen & H. Q. Huang, 1977
- Cyprinus exophthalmus Đ. Y. Mai, 1978
- Cyprinus fuxianensis Yang et al., 1977
- Cyprinus hieni T. T. Nguyen & A. T. Ho, 2003
- Cyprinus hyperdorsalis V. H. Nguyễn, 1991
- Cyprinus ilishaestomus H. L. Chen & H. Q. Huang, 1977
- Cyprinus intha Annandale, 1918
- Cyprinus longipectoralis H. L. Chen & H. Q. Huang, 1977
- Cyprinus longzhouensis Y. J. Yang & H. Q. Huang, 1977
- Cyprinus megalophthalmus H. W. Wu et al., 1963
- Cyprinus melanes (Đ. Y. Mai, 1978)
- Cyprinus micristius Regan, 1906
- Cyprinus multitaeniatus Pellegrin & Chevey, 1936
- Cyprinus pellegrini T. L. Tchang, 1933
- Cyprinus qionghaiensis C. H. Liu, 1981
- Cyprinus quidatensis T. T. Nguyen, V. T. Le, T. B. Le & X. K. Nguyễn, 1999
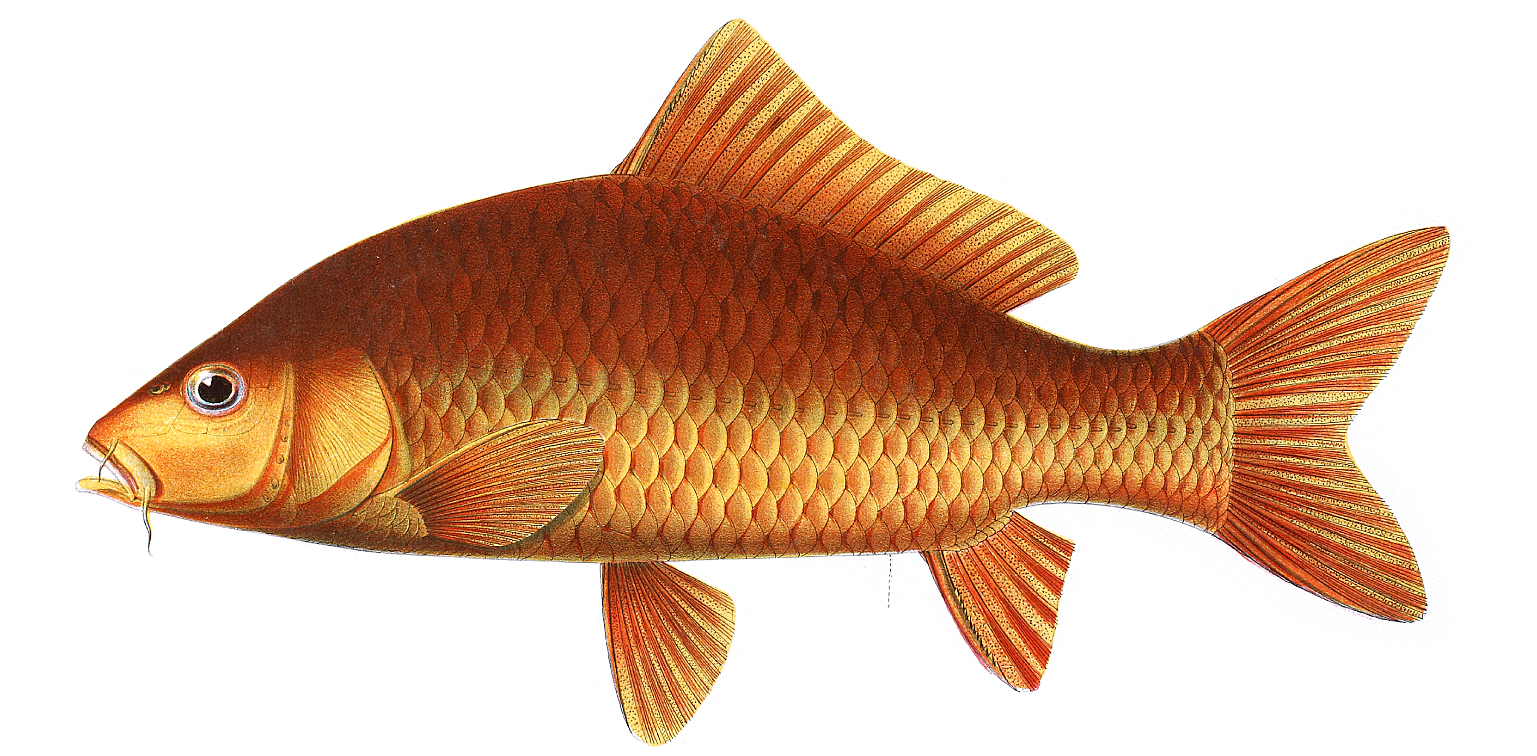
- Cyprinus rubrofuscus Lacépède, 1803
- †Cyprinus yilongensis Yang et al., 1977
- Cyprinus yunnanensis T. L. Tchang, 1933

=== Fossil species ===
- †Cyprinus priscus von Meyer (fossil species from Miocene Germany)
