= Caridina yilong =

Conservation status
- Critically endangered, possibly extinct (IUCN 3.1)

Scientific classification
- Kingdom: Animalia
- Phylum: Arthropoda
- Clade: Pancrustacea
- Class: Malacostraca
- Order: Decapoda
- Suborder: Pleocyemata
- Infraorder: Caridea
- Family: Atyidae
- Genus: Caridina
- Species: C. yilong

Binomial name
- Caridina yilong Cai & Liang, 1999

Species of crustacean

Caridina yilong is a species of freshwater shrimp in the family Atyidae. C. yilong was described from Lake Yilong (Yilong Hu) in Yunnan, China, and was believed to be endemic to the margins of the lake among fringing vegetation. Only the type series has ever been collected, and the type locality of Lake Yilong has since dried up for extended periods of time due to the abstraction of water (notably in 1984, one year after their collection, a twenty-day period of complete dryness was recorded). Organic pollution caused by sedimentation along with agricultural and industrial pollution has caused this species to be assessed as Critically Endangered by the IUCN, with the caveat possibly extinct. In addition, two species of fish, Anabarilius macrolepis and Cyprinus yilongensis, that also were endemic to the lake are now extinct.
