= Daguan Park =

Park in Kunming, China

Coordinates: 25°01′45″N 102°40′25″E

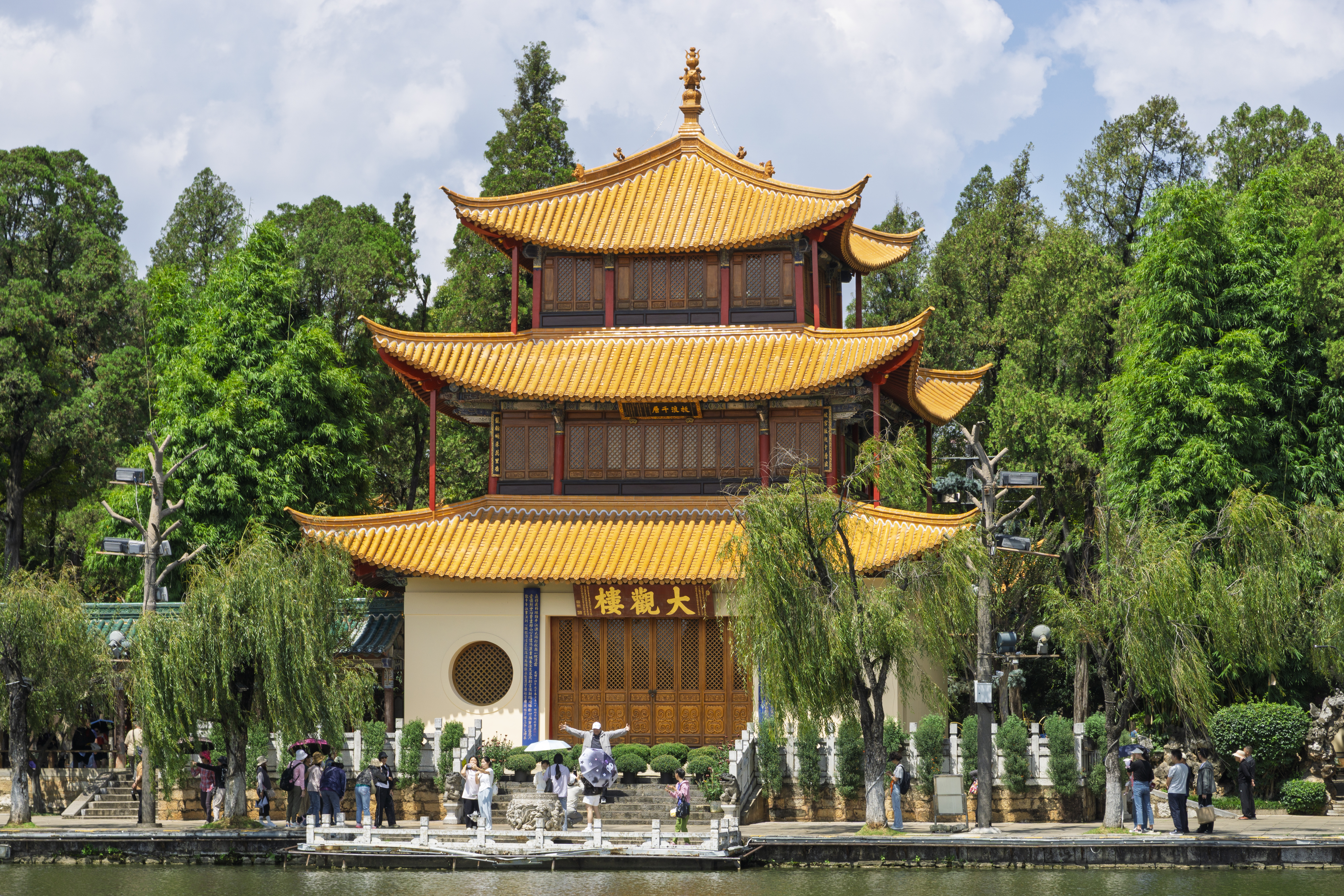
Daguan Lou

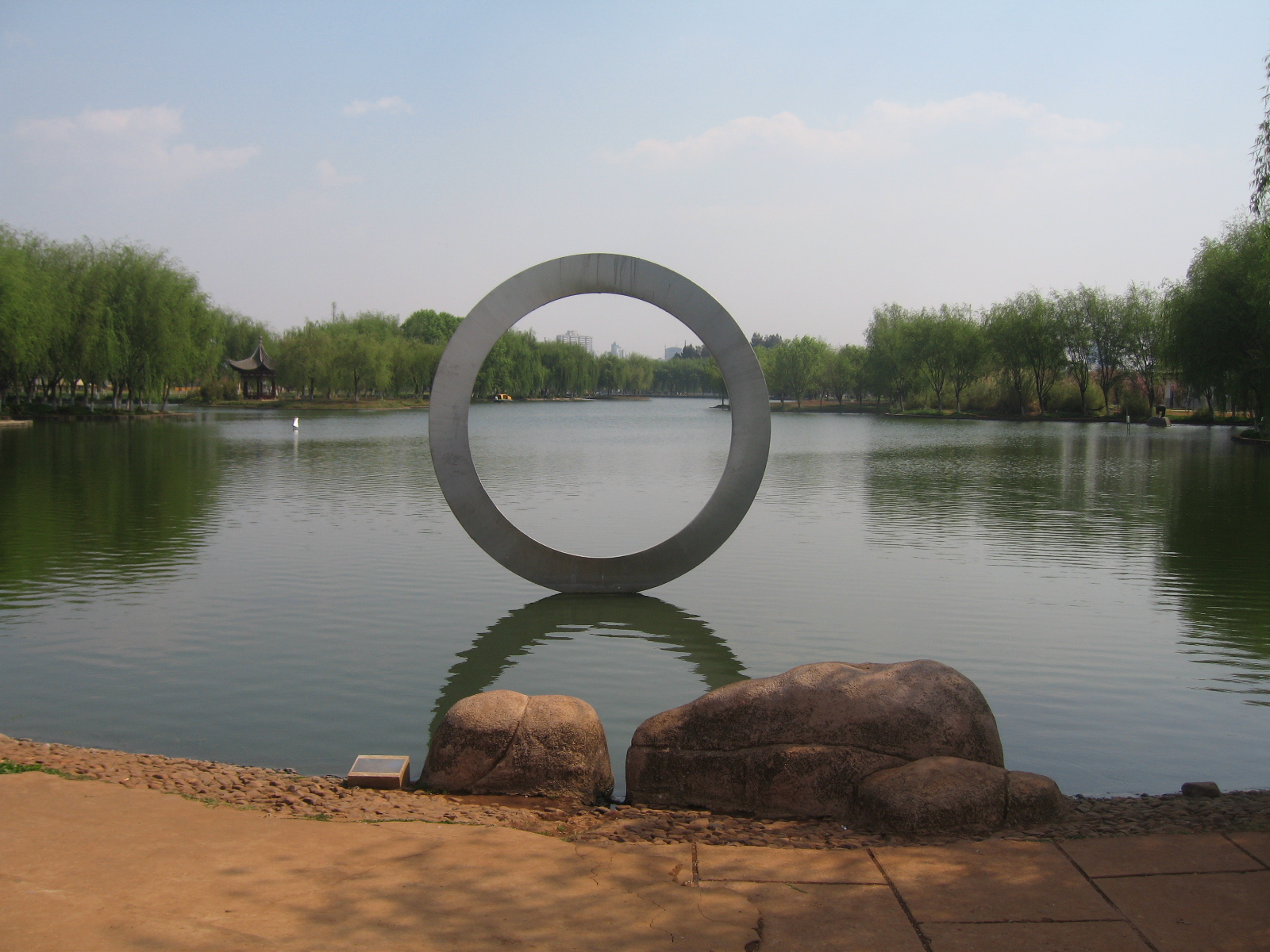
An art installation in Daguan Park

Daguan Park (simplified Chinese: 大观公园; traditional Chinese: 大觀公園; pinyin: Dàguān Gōngyuán) is a lakeside park located in the southwestern suburb of Kunming, Yunnan, China. Today many locals come to sit, drink tea, fly kites, and go boating. Among shady walks and pools, Daguan's focal point is Daguan Lou, a square, three-storeyed pavilion built to better the Kangxi Emperor's enjoyment of the distant Western Hills and now a storehouse of calligraphy extolling the area's charms. The most famous poem here is a 118-character verse, carved into the gateposts by the Qing dynasty scholar Sun Ran, reputed to be the longest set of rhyming couplets in China. The park is set on Daguan Stream, which flows south into Lake Dian, and there are frequent hour-long cruises down the waterway, lined with willows, to points along Lake Dian's northern shore. Lake Dian, also known as the Kunming Lake, is the largest lake on the Yunnan–Guizhou Plateau. At Longmen of the Western Hills, there is a panoramic view of the lake.

== History ==
In 1696, Wang Jiwen, the governor of Yunnan, carried out a largescale construction of a two-story pavilion. Ponds were dug, embankments were constructed, and trees and flowers were planted. With a good view of the waters and hills in the distance, and the sailing boats and trees in mist, the pavilion was titled Daguan ("Grand View") pavilion. In the later years, the Daguan pavilion had twice been reduced to ruins by warfare and flood. In 1883, Chen Yuying, governor of Yunnan and Guizhou Provinces, ordered Monk Xingtian to take charge of the renovation of the pavilion, and the pavilion has remained intact ever since.

Since the Daguan pavilion was built, men of letters coming from far and near in the country have often gathered here, composing and reciting poems. During the past two to three hundred years, many excellent works and poems have been created. Among them, the Long Couplet written by Sun Rangweng has for many years enjoyed the highest reputation around the world. Daguan Park has become famous due to Sun Rangweng's Long Couplet.
