= 滇 =

The Chinese character 滇 may refer to:

- Yunnan, whose Chinese provincial abbreviation is 滇
- Dianchi Lake, the source of Yunnan's abbreviation
