= Fuxian Lake =

Lake in Yunnan, China

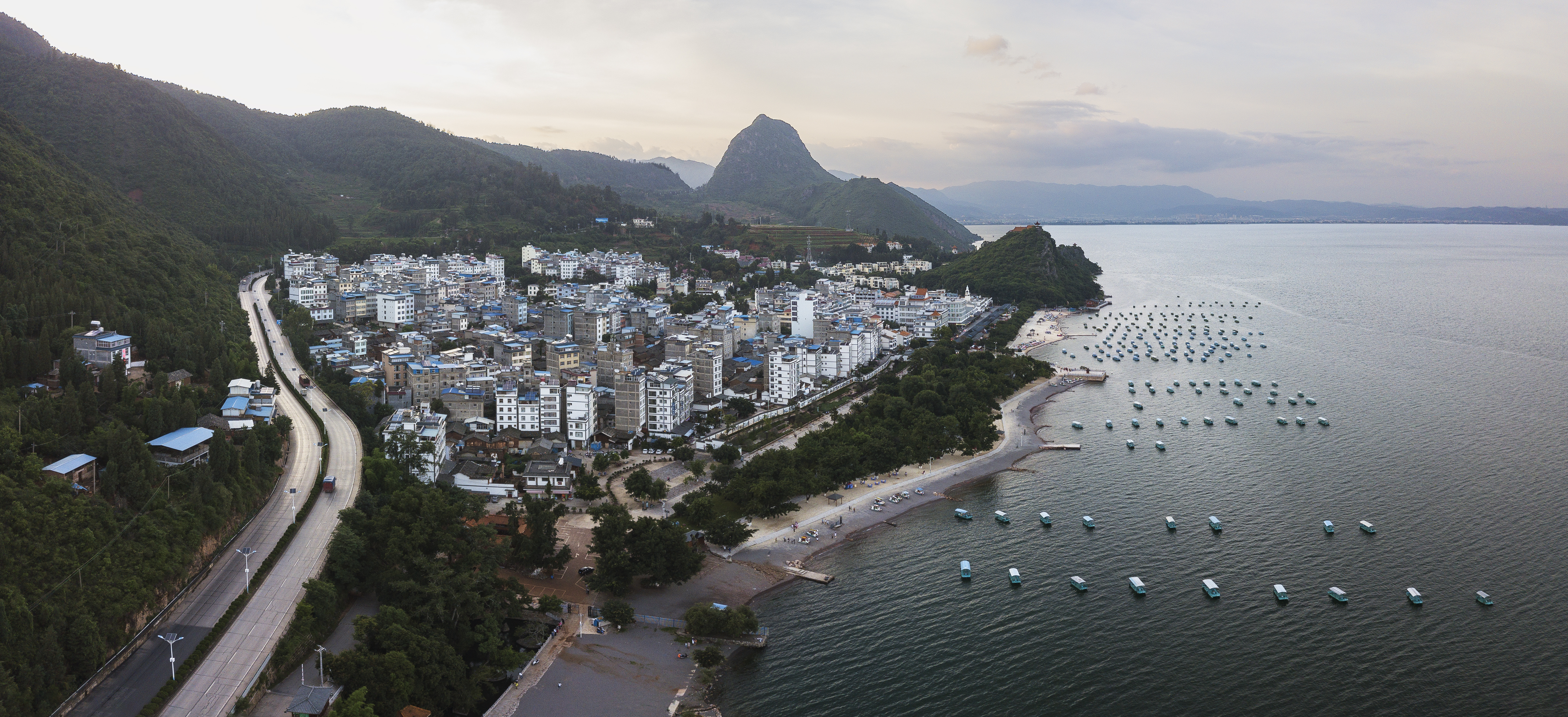
- Fuxian Lake and Luchong Scenic Resort

- Location within Yunnan
- Location: Yunnan Province
- Coordinates: 24°30′08″N 102°53′20″E
- Primary inflows: Liangwang River, Dongda River, Jianshan River
- Primary outflows: Haikou River
- Basin countries: China
- Max. length: 31.5 km (20 mi)
- Max. width: 11.5 km (7 mi)
- Surface area: 211 km^{2} (100 sq mi)
- Average depth: 89.6 m (294 ft)
- Max. depth: 155 m (509 ft)
- Water volume: 18,900×10^{6} m^{3} (670×10^{9} cu ft)
- Surface elevation: 1,721 m (5,646 ft)
- Islands: Gushan
- Settlements: Chengjiang

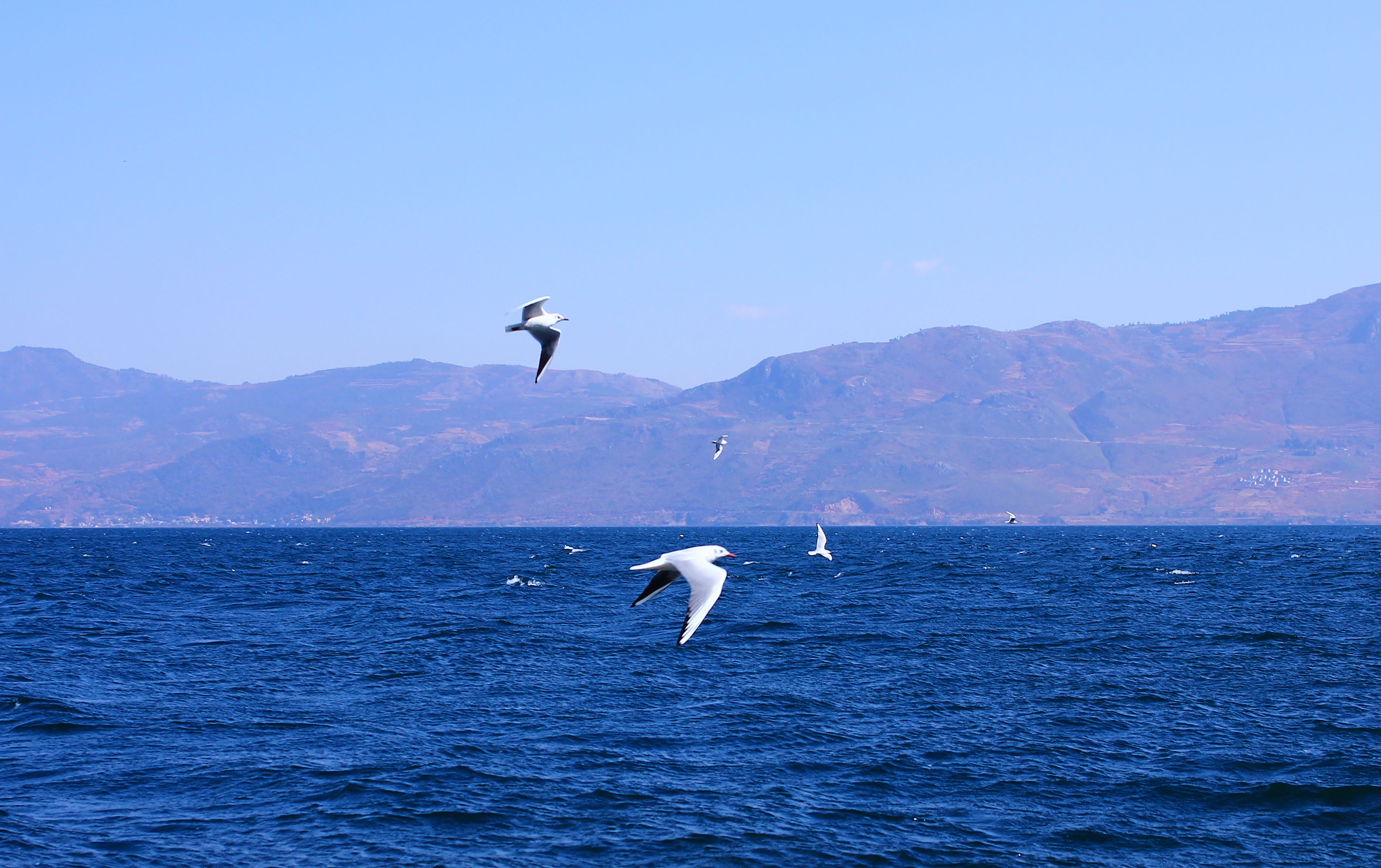
Black-headed Gulls in Fuxian Lake

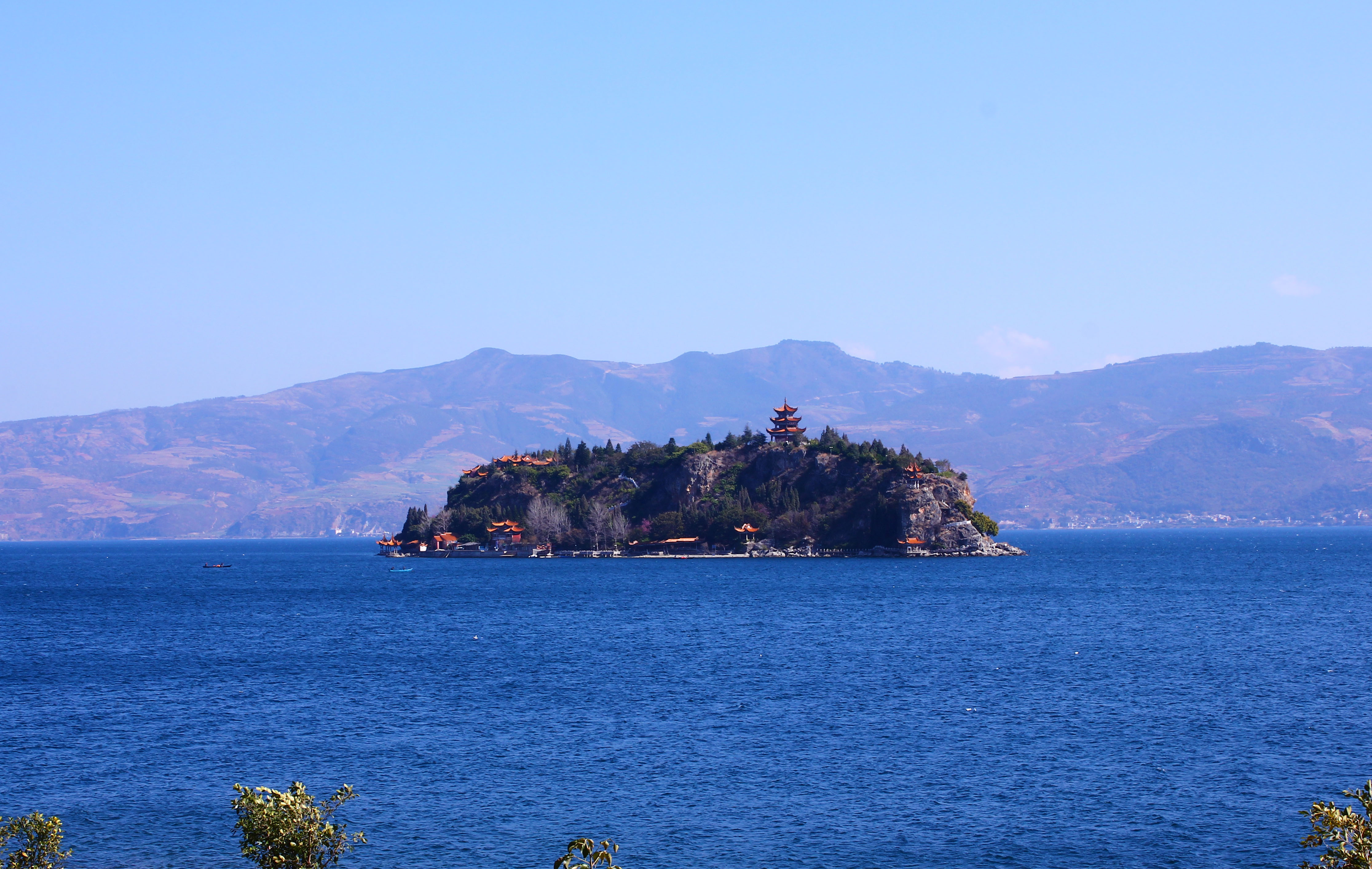
Gushan Hill in Fuxian Lake

Fuxian Lake (Chinese: 抚仙湖; pinyin: Fǔxiān Hú) is a body of water in Yunnan Province, China. It stretches through Chengjiang, Jiangchuan and Huaning Counties, spanning an area of 212 square kilometers. It is the third-largest lake in Yunnan, after Dian Lake and Erhai Lake, and the deepest, at 155 meters. It is the third-deepest fresh water lake in China, after Tianchi and Kanas Lake. The 1m vacuum solar telescope of the Yunnan Astronomical Observatory is located on a shore of the lake.

== Climate ==
Fuxian Lake has a subtropical highland climate (Köppen climate classification Cwb) with humid summers and mild dry winters.

Climate data for Fuxian Lake
Month	Jan	Feb	Mar	Apr	May	Jun	Jul	Aug	Sep	Oct	Nov	Dec	Year
Mean daily maximum °C (°F)	16.7 (62.1)	18.7 (65.7)	22.6 (72.7)	25.1 (77.2)	26.4 (79.5)	26.4 (79.5)	25.6 (78.1)	25.9 (78.6)	24.6 (76.3)	21.2 (70.2)	18.7 (65.7)	16.7 (62.1)	22.4 (72.3)
Daily mean °C (°F)	10.3 (50.5)	12.1 (53.8)	15.5 (59.9)	18.6 (65.5)	21.0 (69.8)	22.3 (72.1)	21.8 (71.2)	21.6 (70.9)	20.2 (68.4)	17.0 (62.6)	13.7 (56.7)	10.8 (51.4)	17.1 (62.7)
Mean daily minimum °C (°F)	3.9 (39.0)	5.5 (41.9)	8.5 (47.3)	12.2 (54.0)	15.7 (60.3)	18.2 (64.8)	18.0 (64.4)	17.4 (63.3)	15.9 (60.6)	12.8 (55.0)	8.8 (47.8)	4.8 (40.6)	11.8 (53.3)
Average precipitation mm (inches)	12 (0.5)	17 (0.7)	19 (0.7)	27 (1.1)	93 (3.7)	165 (6.5)	200 (7.9)	195 (7.7)	113 (4.4)	78 (3.1)	41 (1.6)	14 (0.6)	974 (38.5)
Source: Climate-Data.org

== Flora and fauna ==
Fuxian Lake is known for its unique fauna, including many endemic species. However, its relative isolation makes it vulnerable to biological invasions and pollution.

Together with other Yunnan lakes (Dian, Qilu, Yangzong, Xingyun, and Yilong), Fuxian is recognized as an ecoregion. It is one of three major lakes in the province with a high number of endemic species, the others being Dian (Dianchi) and Erhai. There are 24 native fish species and subspecies in Fuxian Lake, including 11 endemics. The situation for most of these is precarious: besides being threatened by the introduction of 26 species of exotic fish, they have also fallen victim to habitat degradation, water pollution, and overfishing. The endemic fish are all cyprinids or stone loaches.

Endemic fish in Fuxian Lake
Species	IUCN assessment	Comment
Poropuntius chonglingchungi	Critically endangered	Possibly extinct (last seen in the 1990s)
Cyprinus fuxianensis	Critically endangered	Possibly extinct (last seen in the 1990s)
Schizothorax lepidothorax	Endangered	Possibly extinct (last seen in the 1990s)
Sinocyclocheilus tingi	Endangered	Still survives, but strong decline
Tor yunnanensis	Endangered	Possibly extinct (last seen in the 1990s)
Anabarilius grahami	Vulnerable	Still survives, but nearing extinction
Discogobio longibarbatus	Not assessed	Possibly extinct (last seen in the 1990s)
Percocypris regani	Not assessed	Still survives. Recent evidence suggests it should be considered a species (Percocypris regani) instead of a subspecies (Percocypris pingi regani)
Triplophysa fuxianensis	Not assessed	Still survives
Yunnanilus chui	Not assessed	Possibly extinct (last seen in the 1990s)
Yunnanilus obtusirostris	Not assessed	Possibly extinct (last seen in the 1990s)

The extinction of endemic fish species, together with some native hydrophytes, accelerated in the first decade of the 21st century.

The fungus Dyrithiopsis lakefuxianensis, growing on submerged wood, has been collected from Fuxian Lake and described as a newly discovered species, as indicated by its scientific name. The prehistoric Fuxianhuia from the early-Cambrian, significant in discussions of early arthropod evolution, is also named after the lake, where it was discovered in 1987.

== Lost city ==
In 2001 People's Daily reported that earthenware and stonework covering an area of approximately 2.4–2.7 square kilometers had been discovered beneath the lake. It is speculated that the settlement slid into the lake during an earthquake. Yunnan Museum archaeologist Zhang Zengqi linked the ruins with a city called Yunyuan that once stood by the side of the lake, but this theory has been overturned by later analysis.

In 2006, China Central Television made an additional survey. Carbon dating in 2007 found shells attached to relics to be roughly 1,750 years old. In October 2014 additional research was made on the site by a multidisciplinary team. Portions were mapped and 42 handmade stone artifacts were recovered from a depth of seven meters.

== Panorama ==
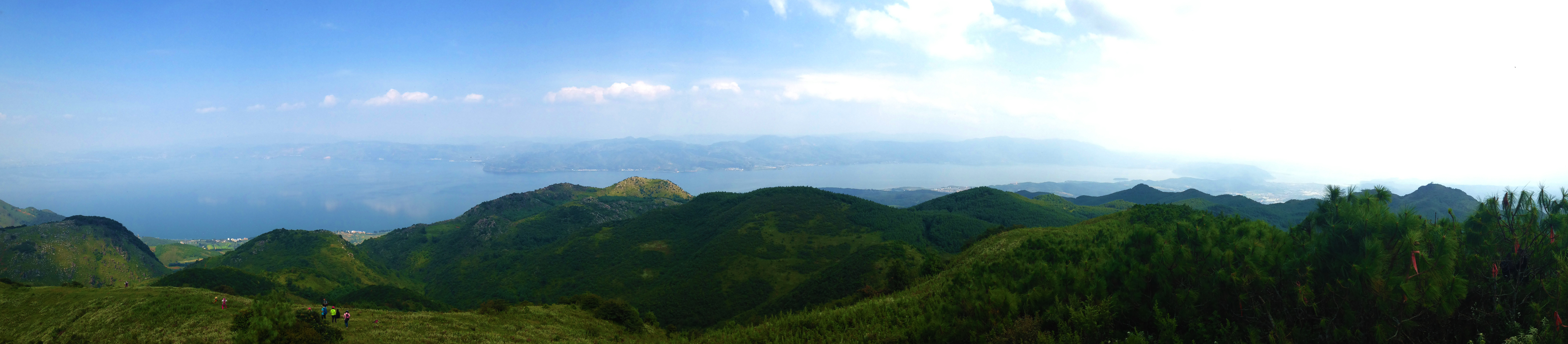
Panorama of Fuxian Lake taken from mountains to the west.
