= Percocypris =

Scientific classification
- Kingdom: Animalia
- Phylum: Chordata
- Class: Actinopterygii
- Order: Cypriniformes
- Family: Cyprinidae
- Subfamily: Schizothoracinae
- Genus: Percocypris; Y. T. Chu, 1935

Type species
- Leptobarbus pingi Tchang, 1930

Genus of fishes

Percocypris is a genus of cyprinid freshwater fishes found in large rivers and Fuxian Lake in the highlands of southern China and northern mainland southeast Asia. They are predators that mainly feed on smaller fish. They can reach up to around 50 cm (20 in) in standard length and more than 2 kg (4.5 lb) in weight.

Percocypris all are rare and threatened. As of 2013, the Chinese Red List only recognizes one species in this genus (others considered subspecies) and treats it as vulnerable. P. tchangi of the Red River has not been confirmed since its original description in 1936 (however, P. retrodorsalis has been recorded recently and some include it in P. tchangi). Primary threats are overfishing and habitat loss, especially from dams and pollution. P. pingi is farmed and captive-bred individuals are released back into the wild by several institutions in an attempt of countering its threatened status.

== Taxonomy and species ==
The currently recognized species historically were all considered as subspecies of P. pingi, a treatment still used by IUCN. Genetic and morphological evidence support their validity as separate species and also indicate that there are two currently undescribed species (one from upper Pearl River, another from Salween River), bringing the total to six allospecies. The status of P. retrodorsalis remains disputed. It is recognized as a species by Catalog of Fishes, but not by FishBase where included in P. tchangi.

- Percocypris pingi (T. L. Tchang, 1930)
- Percocypris regani (T. L. Tchang, 1935)
- Percocypris retrodorsalis Cui & Chu, 1990
- Percocypris tchangi (Pellegrin & Chevey, 1936)
