= Cyprinus ilishaestomus =

Conservation status
- Critically endangered, possibly extinct (IUCN 3.1)

Scientific classification
- Kingdom: Animalia
- Phylum: Chordata
- Class: Actinopterygii
- Order: Cypriniformes
- Family: Cyprinidae
- Subfamily: Cyprininae
- Genus: Cyprinus
- Species: C. ilishaestomus

Binomial name
- Cyprinus ilishaestomus H. L. Chen & H. Q. Huang, 1977

Species of fish

Cyprinus ilishaestomus is a species of ray-finned fish in the genus Cyprinus. Critically endangered, it inhabits Qilu Lake, Yunnan, China.
