= Cyprinus yunnanensis =

Conservation status
- Critically endangered, possibly extinct (IUCN 3.1)

Scientific classification
- Kingdom: Animalia
- Phylum: Chordata
- Class: Actinopterygii
- Order: Cypriniformes
- Family: Cyprinidae
- Subfamily: Cyprininae
- Genus: Cyprinus
- Species: C. yunnanensis

Binomial name
- Cyprinus yunnanensis T. L. Tchang, 1933

Species of fish

Cyprinus yunnanensis is a critically endangered species of cyprinid fish in the genus Cyprinus from Qilu Lake in Yunnan, China. Despite surveys of the lake it has not been seen since the 1970s and it is possibly extinct. It reaches up to about 20 cm (8 in) in length.
