= Cyprinus barbatus =

Conservation status
- Critically endangered, possibly extinct (IUCN 3.1)

Scientific classification
- Kingdom: Animalia
- Phylum: Chordata
- Class: Actinopterygii
- Order: Cypriniformes
- Family: Cyprinidae
- Subfamily: Cyprininae
- Genus: Cyprinus
- Species: C. barbatus

Binomial name
- Cyprinus barbatus H. L. Chen & H. Q. Huang, 1977

Species of fish

Cyprinus barbatus is a species of ray-finned fish in the genus Cyprinus. It is endemic to Lake Erhai in Dali, Yunnan, China. It is negatively impacted by agricultural and domestic pollution and introduced species. The IUCN considers it as critically endangered and possibly extinct, but records as recent as the 2000s (decade) show that it likely does survive.
