= Cyprinus acutidorsalis =

Scientific classification
- Kingdom: Animalia
- Phylum: Chordata
- Class: Actinopterygii
- Order: Cypriniformes
- Family: Cyprinidae
- Subfamily: Cyprininae
- Genus: Cyprinus
- Species: C. acutidorsalis

Binomial name
- Cyprinus acutidorsalis Y. H. Wang, 1979

Species of fish

Cyprinus acutidorsalis is a species of ray-finned fish in the genus Cyprinus found in China in freshwater.

== Description ==
It can reach a total weight of up to 500 g.
