= Dyrithiopsis =

Scientific classification
- Kingdom: Fungi
- Division: Ascomycota
- Class: Sordariomycetes
- Order: Amphisphaeriales
- Family: Sporocadaceae
- Genus: Dyrithiopsis; L. Cai, R. Jeewon & K.D. Hyde

Type species
- Dyrithiopsis lakefuxianensis L. Cai, R. Jeewon & K.D. Hyde

Genus of fungi

Dyrithiopsis is a genus of fungi in the family Sporocadaceae. This is a monotypic genus, containing the single species Dyrithiopsis lakefuxianensis from Fuxian Lake in China.
