= Cyprinus multitaeniatus =

Conservation status
- Near Threatened (IUCN 3.1)

Scientific classification
- Kingdom: Animalia
- Phylum: Chordata
- Class: Actinopterygii
- Order: Cypriniformes
- Family: Cyprinidae
- Subfamily: Cyprininae
- Genus: Cyprinus
- Species: C. multitaeniatus

Binomial name
- Cyprinus multitaeniatus Pellegrin & Chevey, 1936

Species of fish

Cyprinus multitaeniatus is a species of ray-finned fish in the genus Cyprinus from the Xi River basin in China and Gâm River basin in Vietnam.
