= Cyprinus longipectoralis =

Scientific classification
- Kingdom: Animalia
- Phylum: Chordata
- Class: Actinopterygii
- Order: Cypriniformes
- Family: Cyprinidae
- Subfamily: Cyprininae
- Genus: Cyprinus
- Species: C. longipectoralis

Binomial name
- Cyprinus longipectoralis H. L. Chen & H. Q. Huang, 1977

Species of fish

Cyprinus longipectoralis is a species of ray-finned fish in the genus Cyprinus. It is endemic to Lake Erhai in Dali, Yunnan.

== Footnotes ==
- Froese, Rainer; Pauly, Daniel (eds.). "Cyprinus longipectoralis". FishBase.
