= Cyprinus micristius =

Conservation status
- Critically endangered, possibly extinct (IUCN 3.1)

Scientific classification
- Kingdom: Animalia
- Phylum: Chordata
- Class: Actinopterygii
- Division: Teleostei
- Order: Cypriniformes
- Family: Cyprinidae
- Subfamily: Cyprininae
- Genus: Cyprinus
- Species: C. micristius

Binomial name
- Cyprinus micristius Regan, 1906.

Synonyms
- Mesocyprinus micristius (Regan, 1906)

Species of fish

Cyprinus micristius, the Dianchi carp, is a critically endangered species of ray-finned fish in the family Cyprinidae. It is found only in Lake Dianchi and its tributaries in Yunnan, China. The nominate subspecies from the lake itself has not been confirmed since the 1960s.
