= Cyprinus intha =

Conservation status
- Endangered (IUCN 3.1)

Scientific classification
- Kingdom: Animalia
- Phylum: Chordata
- Class: Actinopterygii
- Order: Cypriniformes
- Family: Cyprinidae
- Subfamily: Cyprininae
- Genus: Cyprinus
- Species: C. intha

Binomial name
- Cyprinus intha Annandale, 1918

Species of fish

Cyprinus intha is a species of ray-finned fish in the genus Cyprinus. The species is endemic to Inle Lake, a large, isolated freshwater lake on the Shan Plateau in eastern Myanmar. It is considered to be endangered, among other reasons, because of widespread hybridization with introduced Common Carp, Cyprinus carpio.
