= Cyprinus daliensis =

Scientific classification
- Kingdom: Animalia
- Phylum: Chordata
- Class: Actinopterygii
- Order: Cypriniformes
- Family: Cyprinidae
- Subfamily: Cyprininae
- Genus: Cyprinus
- Species: C. daliensis

Binomial name
- Cyprinus daliensis H. L. Chen & H. Q. Huang, 1977

Species of fish

Cyprinus daliensis is a species of ray-finned fish in the genus Cyprinus. It is endemic to Lake Erhai in Dali, Yunnan. It has not been recorded since the 1960s and is possibly extinct.

== Footnotes ==
- Froese, Rainer; Pauly, Daniel (eds.). "Cyprinus daliensis". FishBase.
