= Cyprinus megalophthalmus =

Scientific classification
- Kingdom: Animalia
- Phylum: Chordata
- Class: Actinopterygii
- Order: Cypriniformes
- Family: Cyprinidae
- Subfamily: Cyprininae
- Genus: Cyprinus
- Species: C. megalophthalmus

Binomial name
- Cyprinus megalophthalmus H. W. Wu, G. R. Yang, P. Q. Yue & H. J. Huang, 1963

Species of fish

Cyprinus megalophthalmus is a species of ray-finned fish in the genus Cyprinus that is endemic to Lake Erhai in China. There have been no records since the 1980s and it is possibly extinct.
