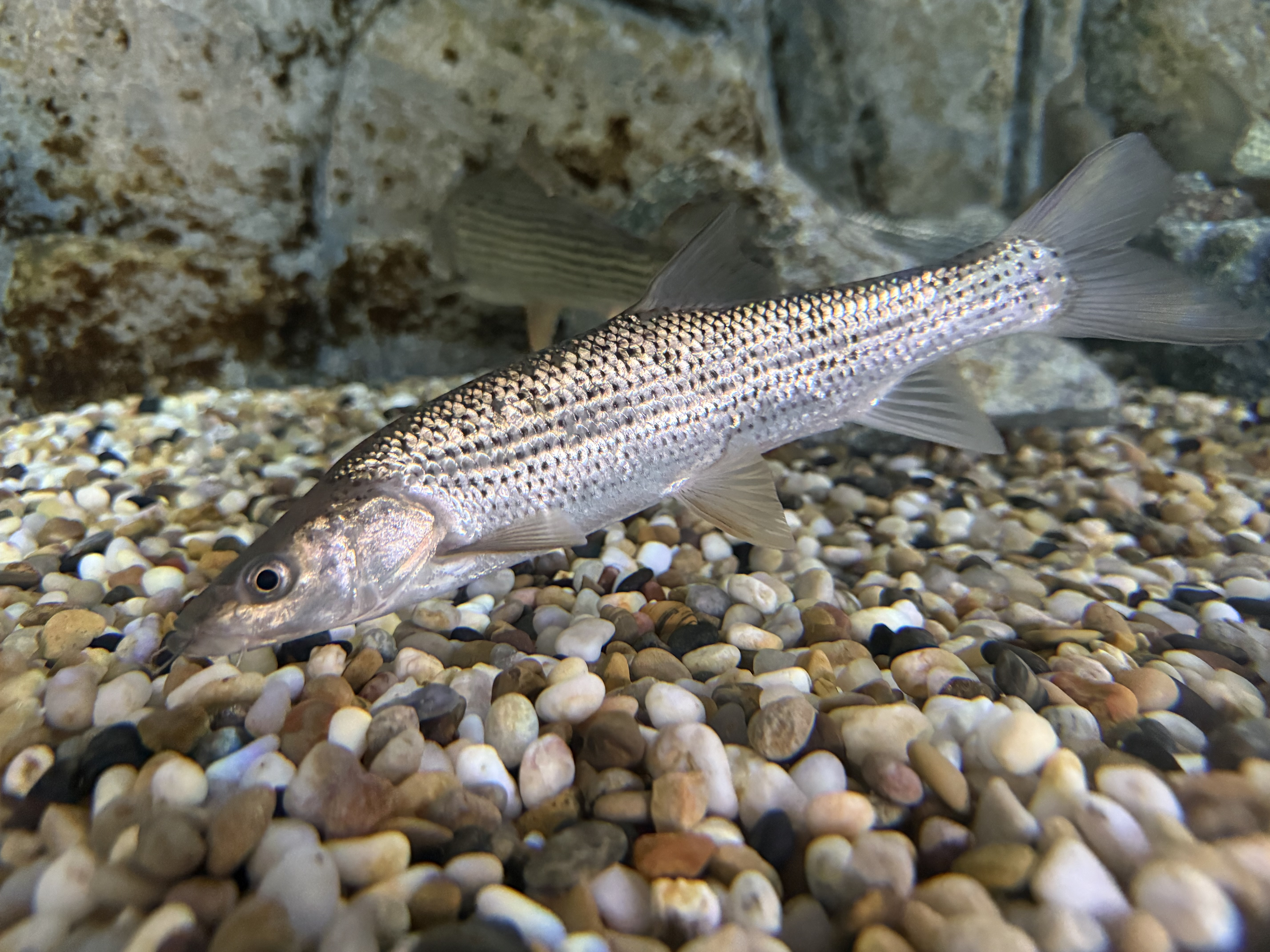
- in captivity

Conservation status
- Data Deficient (IUCN 3.1)

Scientific classification
- Kingdom: Animalia
- Phylum: Chordata
- Class: Actinopterygii
- Order: Cypriniformes
- Family: Cyprinidae
- Genus: Percocypris
- Species: P. pingi

Binomial name
- Percocypris pingi (T. L. Tchang, 1930)

Synonyms
- Leptobarbus pingi T. L. Tchang, 1930; Percocypris pingi pingi (T. L. Tchang, 1930); Barbus pingi (T. L. Tchang, 1930)

= Percocypris pingi =

Species of fish

Percocypris pingi is a species of freshwater ray-finned fish belonging to the family Cyprinidae, the family which includes the carps, barbs and related fishes. It inhabits Yunnan, China and possibly Laos and Myanmar. It has a maximum length of 44.0 centimetres (17.3 in) and is considered harmless to humans. It is used for food both locally and nationally.
