= Percocypris tchangi =

Conservation status
- Data Deficient (IUCN 3.1)

Scientific classification
- Kingdom: Animalia
- Phylum: Chordata
- Class: Actinopterygii
- Order: Cypriniformes
- Family: Cyprinidae
- Genus: Percocypris
- Species: P. tchangi

Binomial name
- Percocypris tchangi (Pellegrin & Chevey, 1936)

Synonyms
- Leptobarbus tchangi Pellegrin & Chevey, 1936

Species of fish

Percocypris tchangi is a species of freshwater ray-finned fish belonging to the family Cyprinidae, the family which also includes the carps, barbs, minnowns and related fishes. It is found in the Salween and Mekong basins of Vietnam.

The fish is named in honor of ichthyologist Tchunlin (or Tchung-Lin) Tchang (1897-1963), who was responsible for describing the other species in this genus.
