= Cyprinus hyperdorsalis =

Conservation status
- Data Deficient (IUCN 3.1)

Scientific classification
- Kingdom: Animalia
- Phylum: Chordata
- Class: Actinopterygii
- Division: Teleostei
- Order: Cypriniformes
- Family: Cyprinidae
- Subfamily: Cyprininae
- Genus: Cyprinus
- Species: C. hyperdorsalis

Binomial name
- Cyprinus hyperdorsalis V. H. Nguyễn, 1991

Species of fish

Cyprinus hyperdorsalis is a species of ray-finned fish in the genus Cyprinus from the Black River basin in northern Vietnam.
