= Cyprinus hieni =

Conservation status
- Data Deficient (IUCN 3.1)

Scientific classification
- Kingdom: Animalia
- Phylum: Chordata
- Class: Actinopterygii
- Order: Cypriniformes
- Family: Cyprinidae
- Subfamily: Cyprininae
- Genus: Cyprinus
- Species: C. hieni

Binomial name
- Cyprinus hieni Nguyem & Ho, 2003

Species of fish

Cyprinus hieni is a species of ray-finned fish in the genus Cyprinus from freshwater habitats in Vietnam.
