= Cyprinus melanes =

Conservation status
- Data Deficient (IUCN 3.1)=

Scientific classification
- Kingdom: Animalia
- Phylum: Chordata
- Class: Actinopterygii
- Order: Cypriniformes
- Family: Cyprinidae
- Subfamily: Cyprininae
- Genus: Cyprinus
- Species: C. melanes

Binomial name
- Cyprinus melanes (Mai, 1978)

Synonyms
- Cyprinus centralus H. D. Nguyễn & Đ. Y. Mai, 1994

Species of fish

Cyprinus melanes is a species of ray-finned fish in the genus Cyprinus from the Kiến Giang River basin in Vietnam.
