= Sphaerophysa dianchiensis =

Conservation status
- Critically Endangered (IUCN 3.1)

Scientific classification
- Kingdom: Animalia
- Phylum: Chordata
- Class: Actinopterygii
- Order: Cypriniformes
- Family: Nemacheilidae
- Genus: Sphaerophysa; W. X. Cao & S. Q. Zhu, 1988
- Species: S. dianchiensis

Binomial name
- Sphaerophysa dianchiensis W. X. Cao & S. Q. Zhu, 1988

Species of fish

Sphaerophysa dianchiensis is a critically endangered species of stone loach endemic to the Dian Lake in China, but it has not been confirmed in decades and is likely extinct.
