= Sinocyclocheilus tingi =

Conservation status
- Endangered (IUCN 3.1)

Scientific classification
- Kingdom: Animalia
- Phylum: Chordata
- Class: Actinopterygii
- Order: Cypriniformes
- Family: Cyprinidae
- Subfamily: Cyprininae
- Genus: Sinocyclocheilus
- Species: S. tingi

Binomial name
- Sinocyclocheilus tingi P. W. Fang, 1936

Species of fish

Sinocyclocheilus tingi is a species of freshwater fish in the family Cyprinidae. It is only known from Fuxian Lake in Yunnan. It grows to 18.3 cm (7.2 in) SL.

Sinocyclocheilus tingi has been impacted by habitat degradation, overfishing, and introduced species, and its numbers have strongly declined.
