= Cyprinus chilia =

Conservation status
- Endangered (IUCN 3.1)

Scientific classification
- Kingdom: Animalia
- Phylum: Chordata
- Class: Actinopterygii
- Order: Cypriniformes
- Family: Cyprinidae
- Subfamily: Cyprininae
- Genus: Cyprinus
- Species: C. chilia

Binomial name
- Cyprinus chilia H. W. Wu, G. R. Yang & H. J. Huang, 1963

Species of fish

Cyprinus chilia is a species of ray-finned fish in the genus Cyprinus from several lakes in the Yunnan plateau of China.
