= Tor yunnanensis =

Conservation status
- Endangered (IUCN 3.1)

Scientific classification
- Kingdom: Animalia
- Phylum: Chordata
- Class: Actinopterygii
- Order: Cypriniformes
- Family: Cyprinidae
- Genus: Folifer
- Species: F. yunnanensis

Binomial name
- Folifer yunnanensis (Y. H. Wang, D. D. Zhuang & L. C. Gao, 1982)

Synonyms
- Tor yunnanensis

Species of fish

Tor yunnanensis is a species of ray-finned fish in the family Cyprinidae. It is found only in Fuxian Lake in Yunnan, China. It has been severely impacted by the introduced species of fish, pollution, and overfishing, and not seen after the 1990s.
