= Cyprinus longzhouensis =

Conservation status
- Data Deficient (IUCN 3.1)

Scientific classification
- Domain: Eukaryota
- Kingdom: Animalia
- Phylum: Chordata
- Class: Actinopterygii
- Order: Cypriniformes
- Family: Cyprinidae
- Subfamily: Cyprininae
- Genus: Cyprinus
- Species: C. longzhouensis

Binomial name
- Cyprinus longzhouensis Y. J. Yang & H. C. Hwang, 1977

Species of fish

Cyprinus longzhouensis is a species of ray-finned fish in the genus Cyprinus. It is only known from the upper Zuo River basin in Guangxi, China, but may occur in associated drainages in northern Vietnam.
