= Cyprinus qionghaiensis =

Conservation status
- Critically endangered, possibly extinct (IUCN 3.1)

Scientific classification
- Kingdom: Animalia
- Phylum: Chordata
- Class: Actinopterygii
- Order: Cypriniformes
- Family: Cyprinidae
- Subfamily: Cyprininae
- Genus: Cyprinus
- Species: C. qionghaiensis

Binomial name
- Cyprinus qionghaiensis Chen-Han Liu, 1981

Species of fish

Cyprinus qionghaiensis is a critically endangered species of fish in the genus Cyprinus from Qiong Lake in Yunnan, China.
