= Cyprinus quidatensis =

Conservation status
- Data Deficient (IUCN 3.1)

Scientific classification
- Domain: Eukaryota
- Kingdom: Animalia
- Phylum: Chordata
- Class: Actinopterygii
- Order: Cypriniformes
- Family: Cyprinidae
- Subfamily: Cyprininae
- Genus: Cyprinus
- Species: C. quidatensis

Binomial name
- Cyprinus quidatensis Nguyen, Le, Le & Nguyen, 1999

Species of fish

Cyprinus quidatensis is a species of ray-finned fish in the genus Cyprinus from freshwater habitats in Vietnam.
