= Cyprinus fuxianensis =

Conservation status
- Critically Endangered (IUCN 3.1)

Scientific classification
- Kingdom: Animalia
- Phylum: Chordata
- Class: Actinopterygii
- Order: Cypriniformes
- Family: Cyprinidae
- Subfamily: Cyprininae
- Genus: Cyprinus
- Species: C. fuxianensis

Binomial name
- Cyprinus fuxianensis Yang et al., 1977

Species of fish

Cyprinus fuxianensis is a species of ray-finned fish in the genus Cyprinus. The species is only known from Fuxian Lake in Yunnan. It has been impacted by habitat degradation, overfishing, and introduced species. It has declined by over 80% in the past 21 years. It was not recorded in a survey in 1995; IUCN considers it as Critically Endangered and possibly extinct.

Individuals in this species can grow up to 22.2 cm. They have a hearing range of 2000 Hz.
