= Dian Lake =

Lake in Yunnan, China

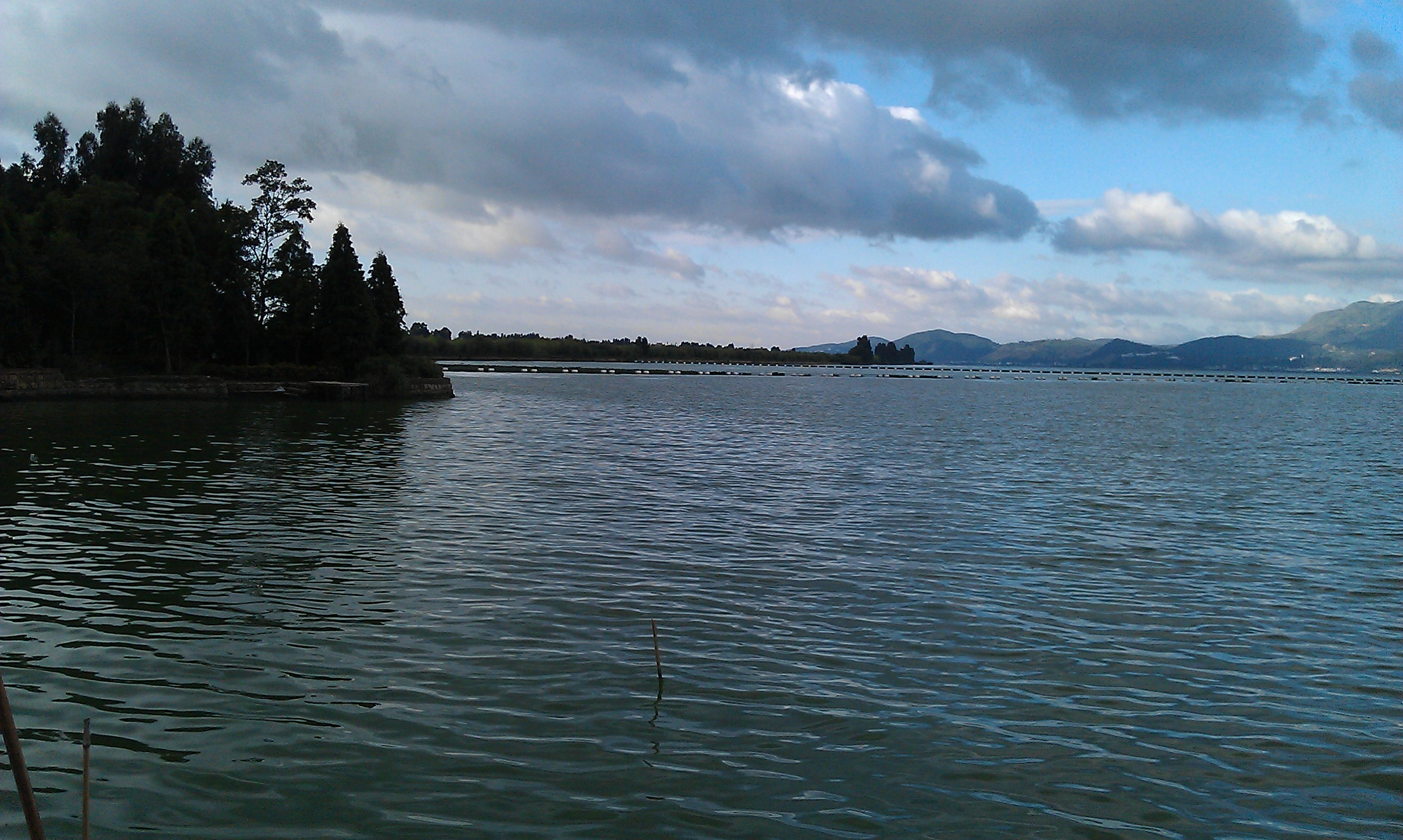

- Location in Yunnan Dian Lake (Yunnan)
- Location: Kunming, Yunnan
- Coordinates: 24°48′02″N 102°40′17″E
- Type: Freshwater
- Primary outflows: Pudu River
- Basin countries: China
- Max. length: 39 km (24 mi)
- Surface area: 298 km^{2} (115 sq mi)
- Average depth: 4.4 m (14 ft)
- Surface elevation: 1,886.5 m (6,189 ft)

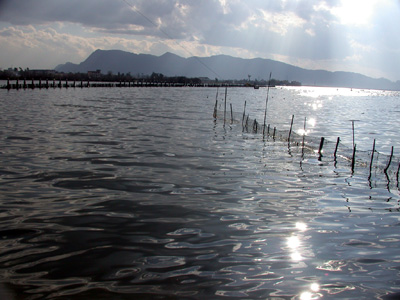
Dianchi Lake (2005)

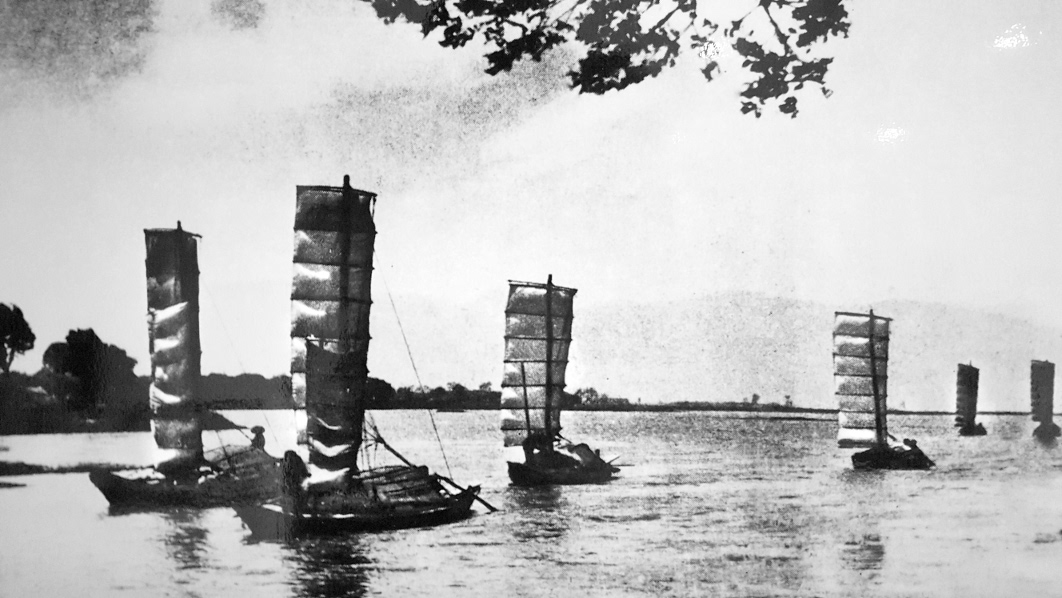
Chinese sailing junks on Lake Dian, circa 1940s

Dian Lake (Chinese: 滇池; pinyin: Diānchí), also known as Dianchi, Dianchi Lake, Lake Dian and Kunming Lake, is a fault lake located on the Puduhe-Xishan fault in Kunming, Yunnan, China at 24°23′–26°22′ N, 102°10′–103°40′ E. Its nickname is the "Sparkling Pearl Embedded in a Highland" (Chinese: 高原明珠; pinyin: Gāoyuánmíngzhū). It is the model for the Kunming Lake in Beijing's Summer Palace. Its name is the source of Yunnan's Chinese abbreviation 滇.

Dian Lake is a shallow freshwater fault lake. The Lake is 40 km long, running from north to south, and has an average width of 7 km with the widest point being 12.5 km. The lake is 1886 meters above sea level and has 150 km of coastline. The lake's drainage area has a monsoon-affected subtropical highland climate (Köppen Cwb), with an average annual temperature of 14.4 °C, a frost-free period of 227 days, and an annual precipitation of 1036 mm. The lake covers 298 km^{2} (115 sq mi). The lake has an average depth of 4.4 m (14 ft), and is divided into two parts by an artificial dike. The northern end of the lake is called Caohai (Chinese: 草海; pinyin: Cáohǎi) and has a surface area of 7.5 km^{2} and an average depth of 2.5 meters. The southern end of the lake, comprising the majority of the lake, is called Waihai (Chinese: 外海; pinyin: Wàihǎi) and has a surface area of 292 km^{2} and an average depth of 4.4 m. The water flows out of the lake to the west via the Pudu River (Chinese: 普渡河; pinyin: Pǔdù Hé) which eventually joins the Yangtze River before finally reaching the Pacific Ocean. Dian Lake is the sixth largest lake in China and the largest lake in Yunnan Province.

== Etymology ==
The Chinese character for the lake (Chinese: 滇; pinyin: Diān) is a phonosemantic compound of the radical 氵("water") and the character 真 ("real"). The character was first found in the Records of the Grand Historian as the name of the Dian Kingdom. Modern studies suggest that the character 滇 is derived from the language of the extinct ancient Bo people and means basin. The character 滇 has been used as the name of the lake since at least 109 BC, when the Han dynasty established "Dianchi County" (滇池县) in the area.

== History ==
Dian Lake was the site of the capital of the independent kingdom of the Cuan (爨) during the first millennium AD. At that time, it was known as Kunchuan (昆川)..

During the Three Kingdoms period (220-280 CE), Dian Lake was where the forces of Shu Han, led by their chancellor Zhuge Liang, visited in triumph after quelling a rebellion by the Nanman tribes of the south.

Between 1958 and 1970, under the CCP's agriculture strategy of "Taking grain as the key link", approximately 54 square kilometers of Dian Lake marshland were reclaimed to expand industry and agriculture in the Kunming basin. On December 28, 1969, a rally for "reclaiming land from the sea" was held in Kunming's Dongfeng Square. 100,000 soldiers along with students and factory workers were mobilized to "fight a war of annihilation to take farmland from Dian Lake". The participants shouted the heroic slogan "March to Dian Lake! Take grain from Dian Lake!". Reclamation efforts were led by People's Liberation Army Lieutenant General Tan Furen. Immediately after taking office, Tan Furen announced that Dian Lake would be a model for the national "reclaiming land from the sea" campaign. The goal was to reclaim 2,000 hectares (4,900 acres) of land from Dian Lake to develop agriculture. Tan Furen personally spearheaded the reclamation project until his death by assassination in 1970.

== Pollution ==
Pollution is a major problem for the lake. Yunnan Province has long been primarily agricultural, but the Dianchi basin has witnessed high industrial growth and boasts the highest population density within Kunming City.

In the late 1990's to early 2000's, Dian Lake was identified as one of the 3 top water pollution concerns in China. The pollution peaked in 2009, at which time the water in Dian Lake was classified "worse than Grade 5" (too dangerous for human contact). Ninety percent of the city of Kunming's wastewater was dumped untreated into the lake until the first wastewater plant was built in 1990. Some experts estimated that over 55% of the lake's fish population has been killed off by this disease-ridden type of pollution. The China Environmental Statistical Yearbook data reported that in 2013, 400 million tons of municipal sewage and 8 million tons of industrial waste water were dumped into Dian Lake of which only 1.5 million tons were treated before dumping. As of 2022, the water in the lake is still rated Grade 5, but is deemed to meet the functional requirements of a water environment.

Historically, Dian Lake played an important role in regulating the microclimate of the surrounding area. It contributed to the productivity of Yunnan Province's industry, agriculture, husbandry, and fisheries. Because Dian Lake is a relatively closed lake with a slow water-exchange rate and low self-purification capacity, it is particularly susceptible to harmful algal blooms and heavy metal contamination. From 1966 to 1970, the lake reclamation project caused severe damage to marsh wetlands in the Caohai area, which along with the large amounts of urban sewage and industrial wastewater traditionally discharged into the lake, exceeded its self-purification capacity and caused serious pollution. It has also been badly affected by cyanobacteria outbreaks in recent decades. To control the pollution of Dian Lake, the Chinese government listed it as a national sewage treatment project in the Three Rivers and Three Lakes (Liaohe, Huaihe, Haihe, Taihu, Chaohu, and Dianchi) scheme launched in 1995. The extensive land reclamation and urbanization projects have had long-lasting impacts on Dian Lake, necessitating ongoing rehabilitation and pollution control efforts to restore the lake's ecological balance. As a result, some wetland parks have been constructed in the lakeside zone to purify the water and create leisure areas for citizens. Wetland parks are mainly in the form of oxidation ponds. They are small water bodies with aquatic plants such as Phragmites australis, Typha orientalis, Acorus calamus, Eichhornia crassipes, Lemna minor, and Pistia stratiotes; outside the ponds, there are trails, trees, and lawns.

== Biodiversity ==
Together with other Yunnan lakes (Fuxian, Qilu, Yangzong, Xingyun, and Yilong), Dian Lake is recognized as an ecoregion. Among the three major Yunnan lakes with a high number of endemics, the other two being Fuxian and Erhai, the most drastic loss of biodiversity has been seen in the Dian Lake. Of the 25 native fish species and subspecies in Dian Lake, 10 are endemic to the basin: Acheilognathus elongatus, Anabarilius alburnops, Anabarilius polylepis, Cyprinus micristius, Liobagrus kingi, Pseudobagrus medianalis, Silurus mento, Sinocyclocheilus grahami, Sphaerophysa dianchiensis and Xenocypris yunnanensis. Today, the only endemic fish known to survive in the lake itself is Anabarilius alburnops, but it is endangered. The remaining have not been recorded there since the 1990s or earlier, and most are presumed extinct. Two other species, Schizothorax grahami and Yunnanilus nigromaculatus, are endemic to the general region, but have also disappeared from Dian Lake itself. Among the non-endemic natives, only gold fish and Asian swamp eel still live in Dian Lake. In contrast to the status of the natives, the lake is now home to more than 25 introduced fish species.

The Yunnan lake newt (Cynops wolterstorffi) was also endemic to the lake, but it has not been seen since 1979 and is considered extinct.

Many native hydrophytes have also disappeared from the lake.

== Gallery ==
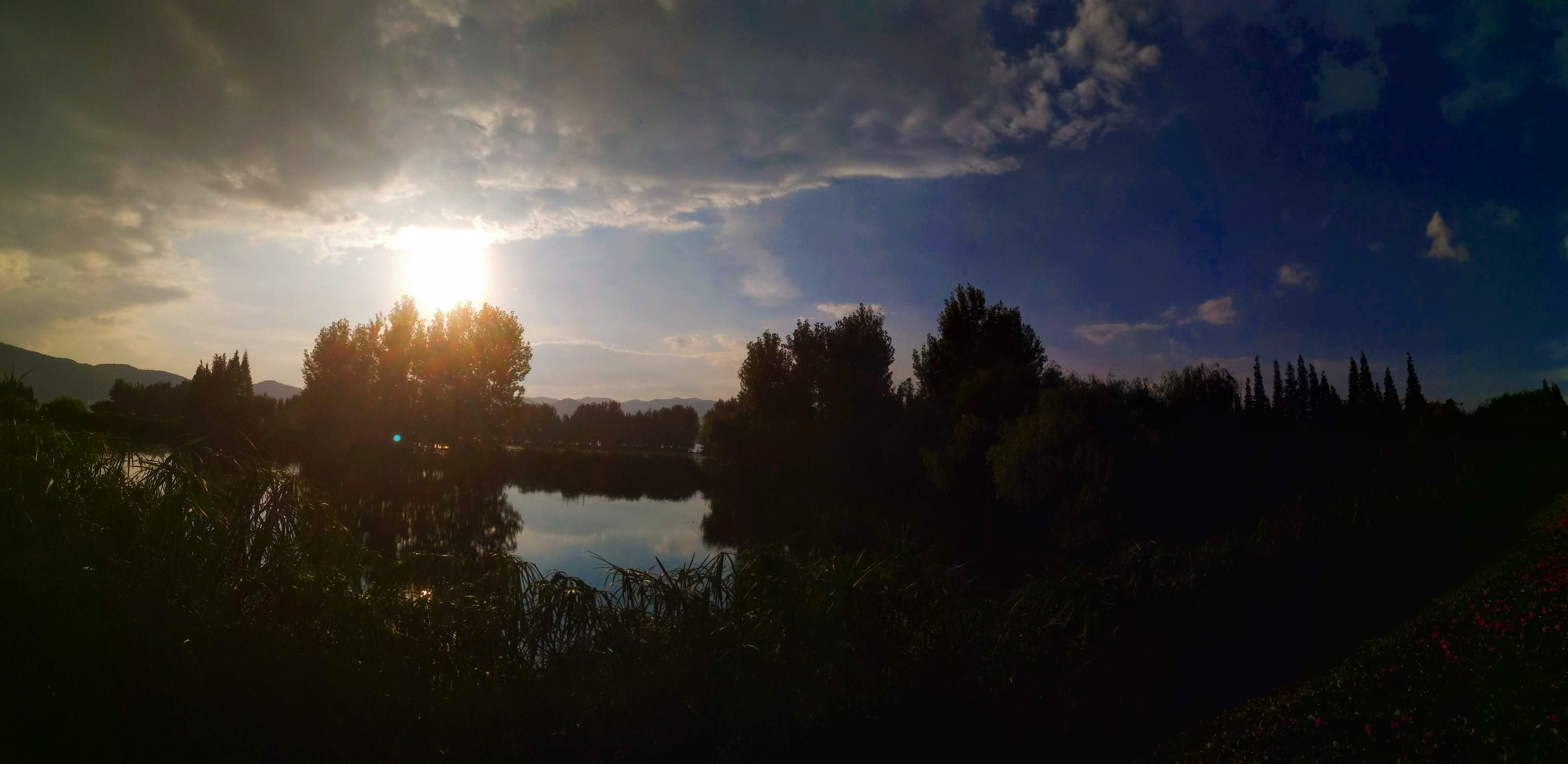
Silhouette of trees along the coast of Dianchi

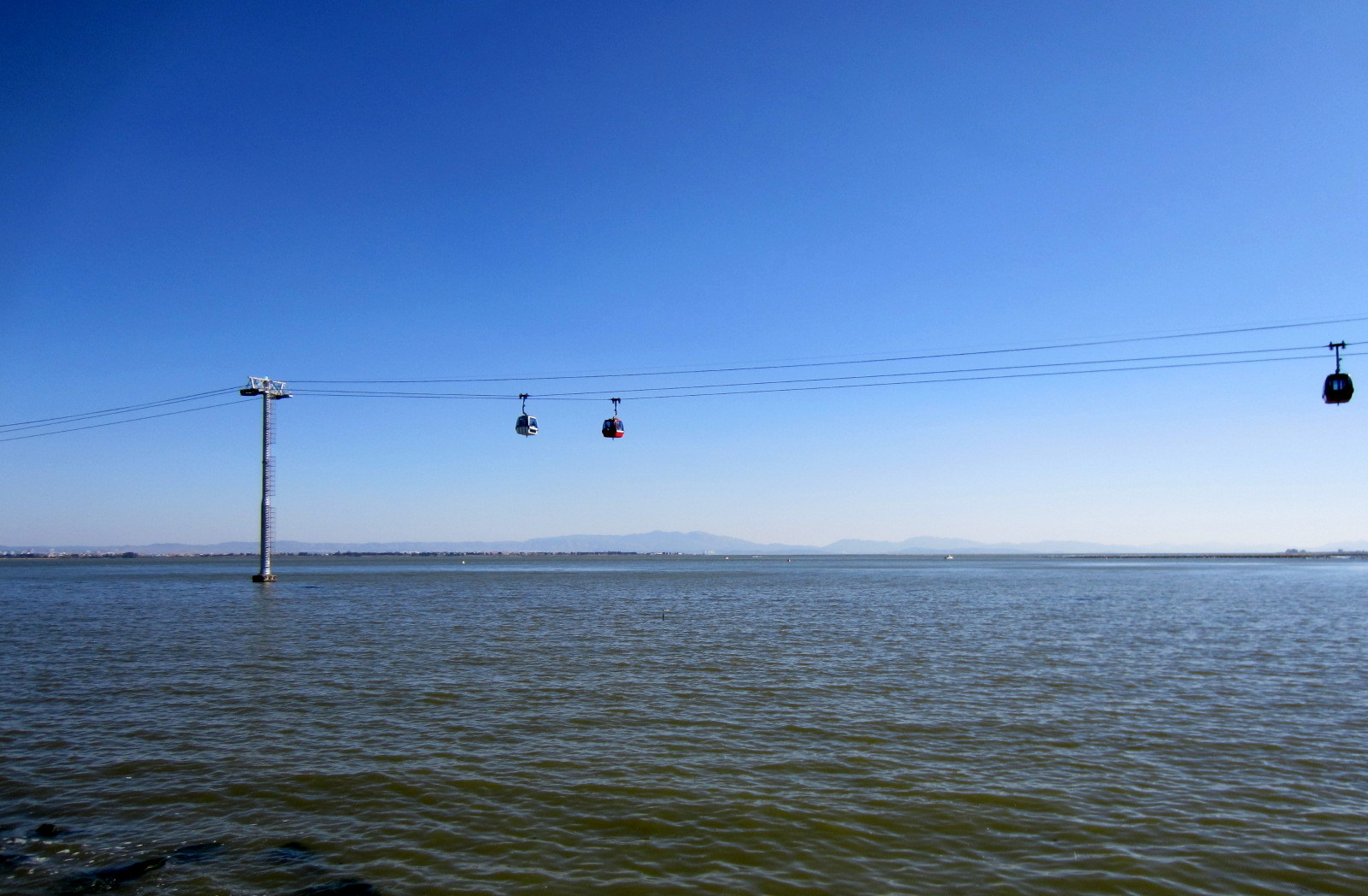
Cable cars above Dianchi

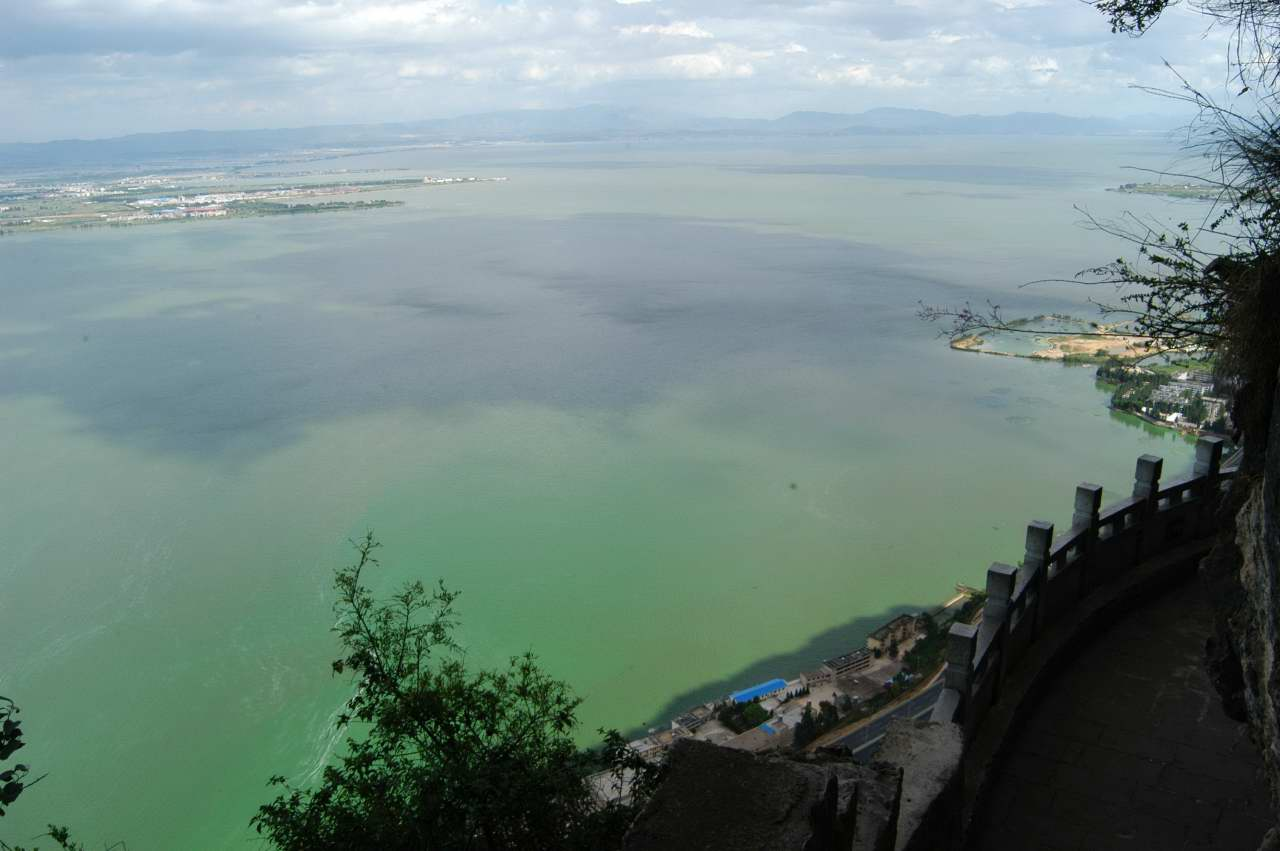
View of the lake from Xishan

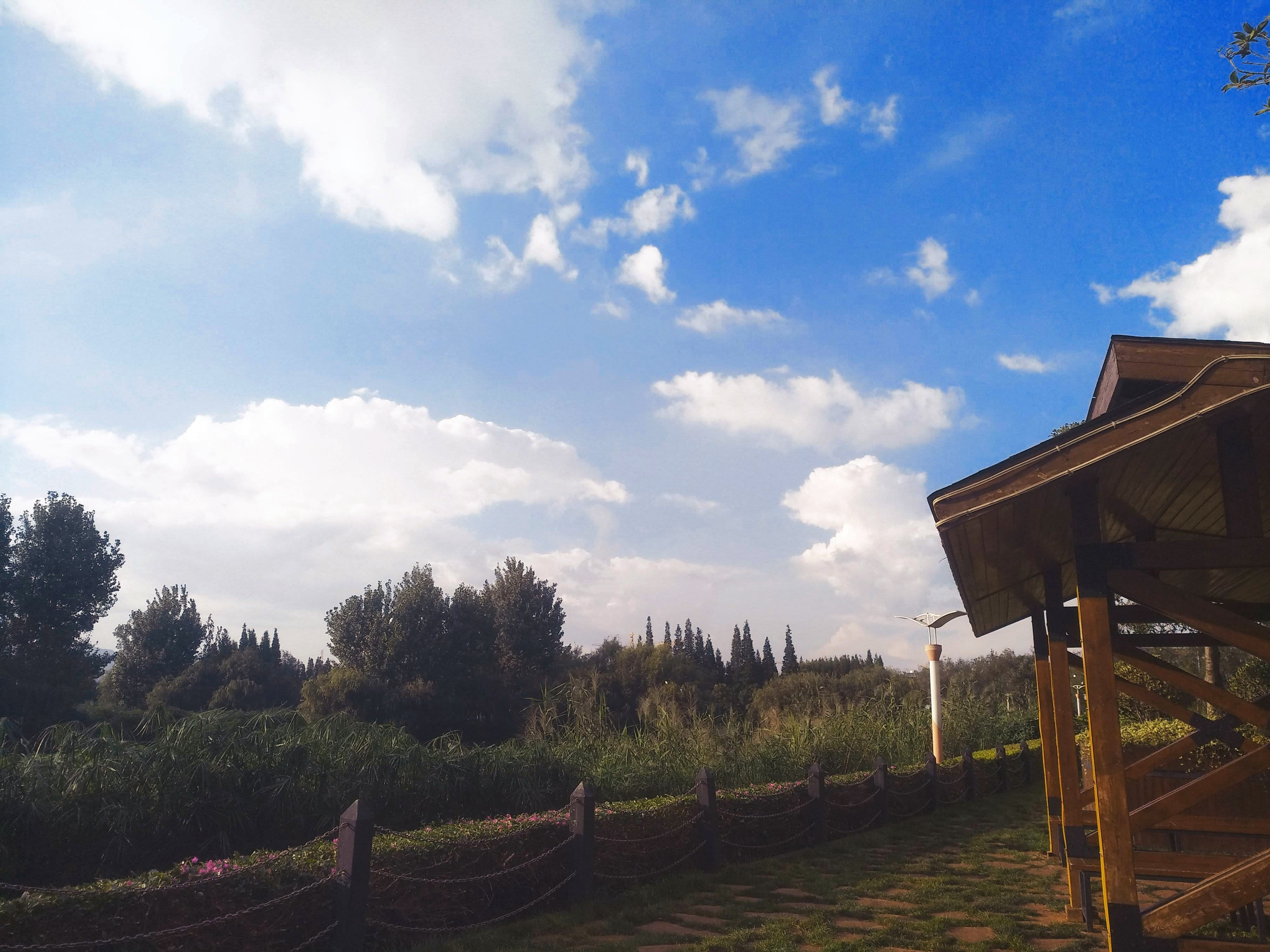
Shelter along Dianchi

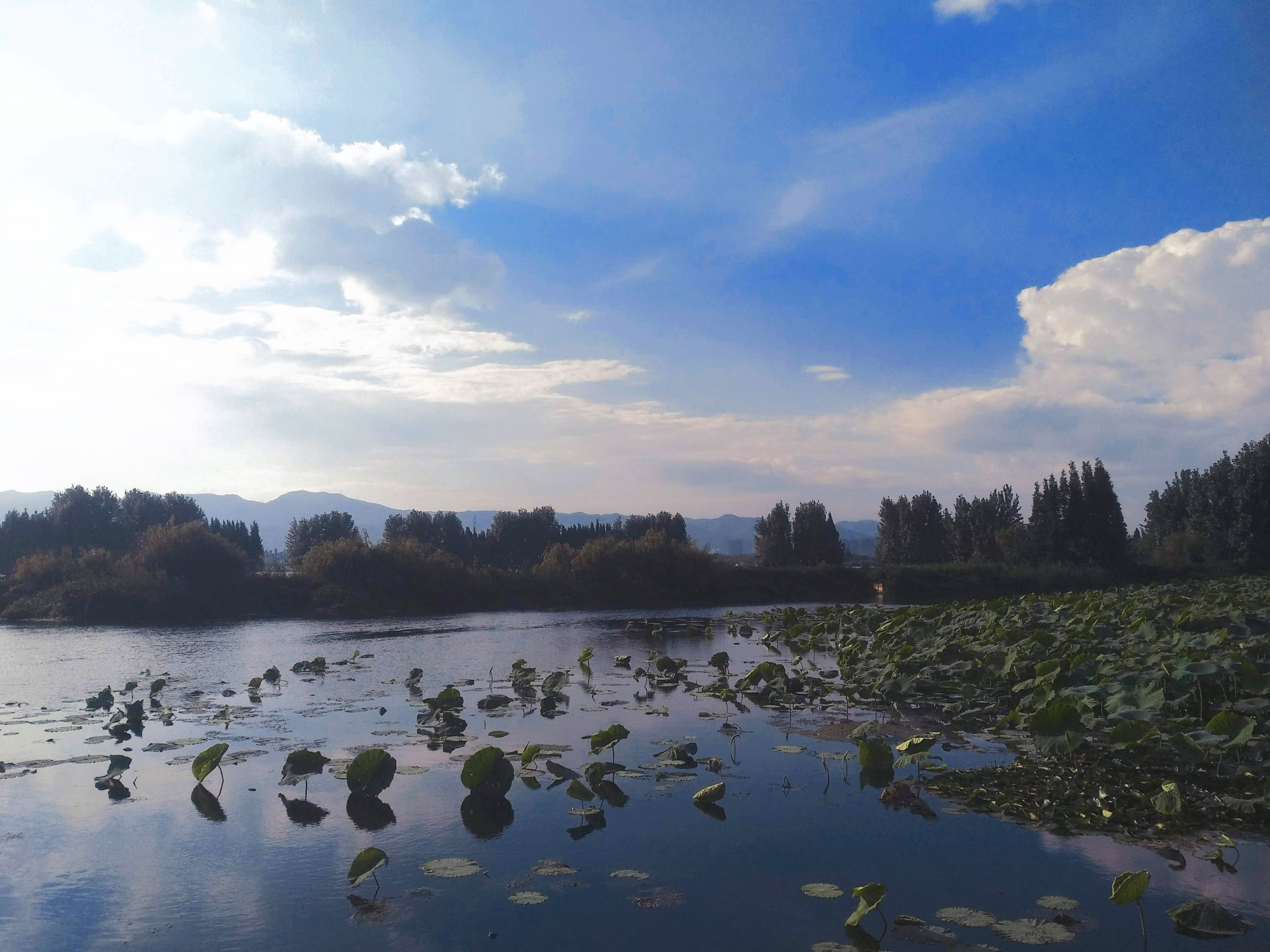
Lotuses in Dianchi

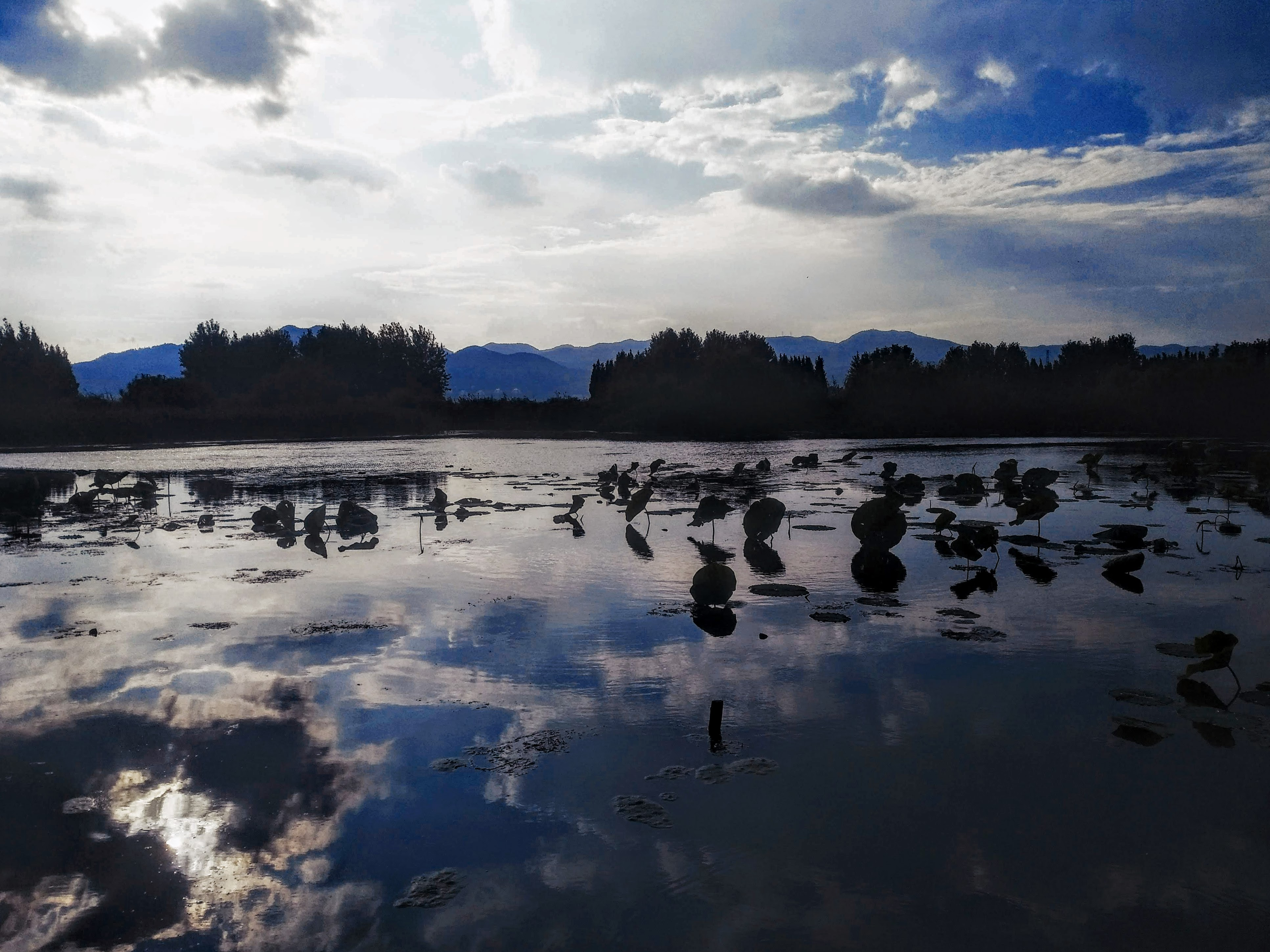
Lotuses in Dianchi

== See also ==
- Zheng He
- Dian Kingdom
- List of lakes in China
