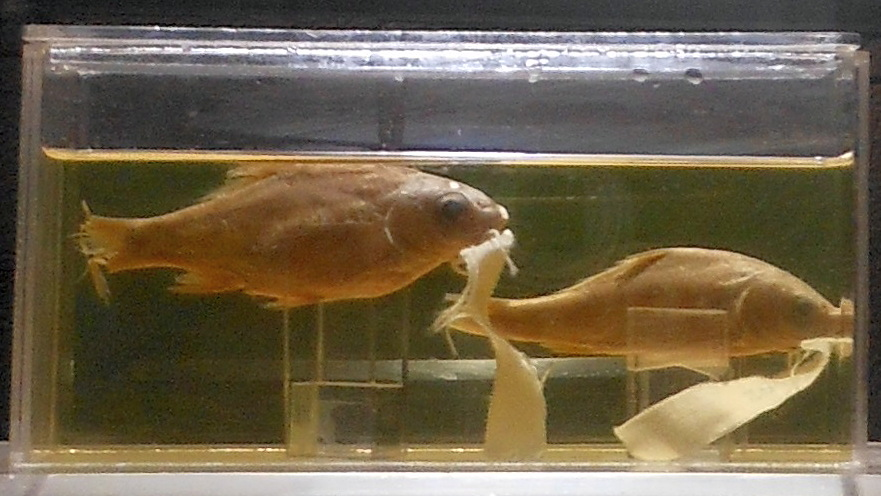
- A specimen of Cyprinus yilongensis exhibited in the Museum of Hydrobiological Sciences of Wuhan Institute of Hydrobiology

Conservation status
- Extinct (1981) (IUCN 3.1)

Scientific classification
- Kingdom: Animalia
- Phylum: Chordata
- Class: Actinopterygii
- Order: Cypriniformes
- Family: Cyprinidae
- Subfamily: Cyprininae
- Genus: Cyprinus
- Species: †C. yilongensis

Binomial name
- †Cyprinus yilongensis Yang et al., 1977

= Cyprinus yilongensis =

Extinct species of fish

Cyprinus yilongensis (Common name: Yilong Lake Carp) is an extinct species of ray-finned fish in the family Cyprinidae. It was found only in Yilong Lake, Yunnan, China. It was last seen before 1981, when the lake was drained for 20 days, presumably causing the species' extermination.
