= Western Mountains =

Mountain range in Yunnan, China

Western Hills
- 西山
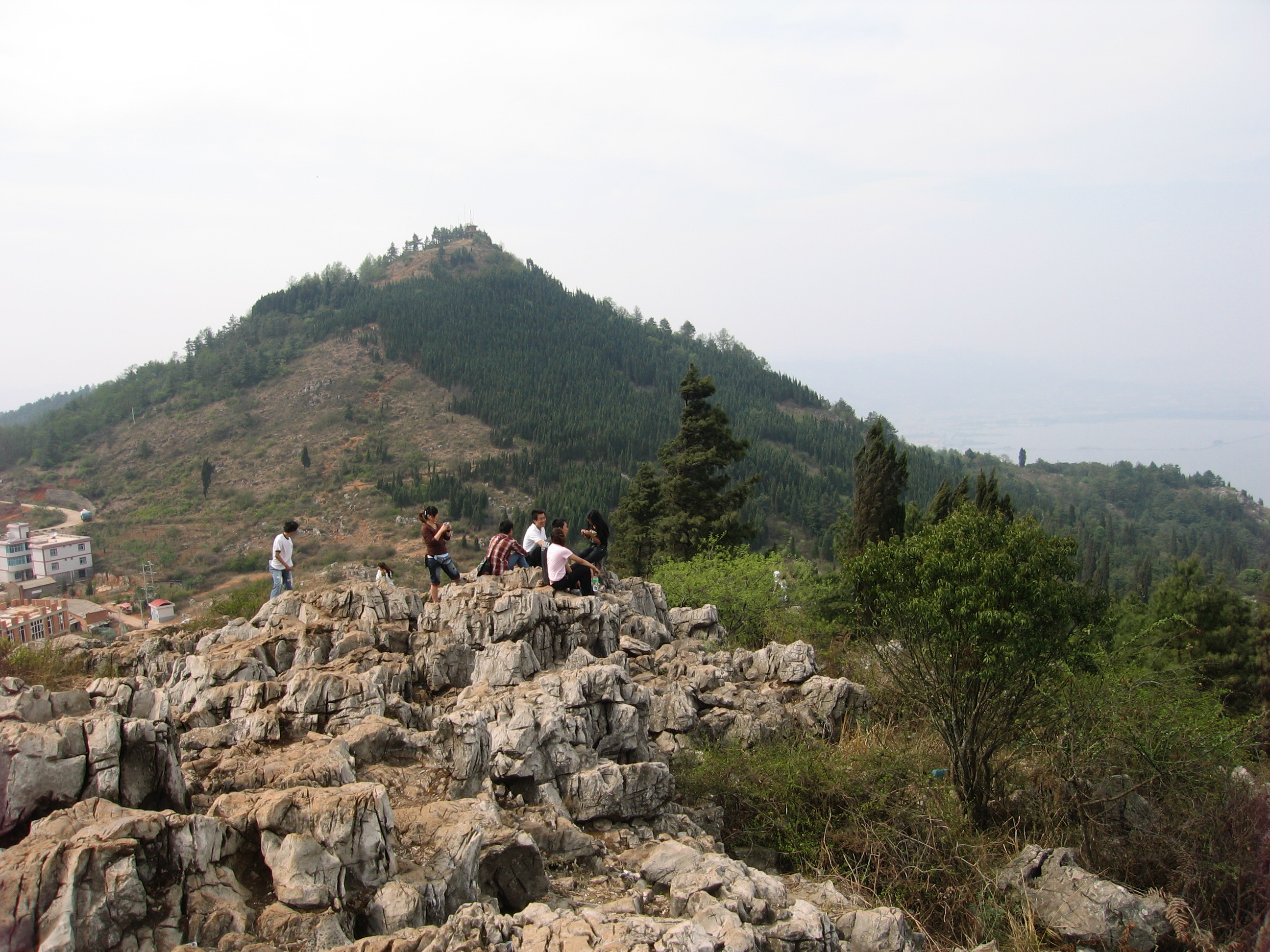
- View of one of the summits of the range

Highest point
- Elevation: 2,511 m (8,238 ft)
- Coordinates: 24°57′11″N 102°37′23″E

Geography
- Location within China
- Location: Yunnan, China

Geology
- Mountain type: Karstic

Climbing
- Easiest route: From Kunming

The Western Mountains or Western Hills (Chinese: 西山 Xi Shan) are a scenic mountain area located 12 km to the west of Kunming, Yunnan, China. They are formed by the Huating, Taihua and Luohan mountain ranges rising above the eastern and northern banks of Dianchi Lake.

== Protected area ==
The Western Hills are a protected area known as the Western Hills Forest Reserve (simplified Chinese: 西山森林公园; traditional Chinese: 西山森林公園; pinyin: Xī Shān Sēnlín Gōngyuán). The ranges have spectacular steep cliffs and stretch from the wooded Huating Temple to the Longmen Mountains (Dragon's Gate Mountains). Clouds and mist often hide the mountain sides covered with giant firs and pines where some ancient temples are to be found.

=== Caves ===
In the cliffs under Luohan Peak, in the Western Hills, are the Longmen Grottoes, with a stone gate leading to the Datiange chamber. 2,300 metres above sea level, these are the largest Taoist grottoes in Yunnan. It took 72 years to build these grottoes during the Qing dynasty, from the 46th year of the Qianlong Emperor's reign (1782) to the 3rd year of the Xianfeng Emperor's reign (1854). The project was undertaken by stone craftsmen living at the foot of the Western Hills. It is said that the workers could get a measure of rice for each measure of stone, poor payment for such hard and dangerous work.

Datiange (Mansion of Heaven) is a stone chamber carved out of the cliffs and is regarded as the finest of the Longmen Grottoes. The relief carving on the walls, the gods, the sacrificial table and the candlesticks are all sculpted following the original shape of the rocks. The Kuixing (God of literature and exams) in the center has one foot on a huge turtle. Holding a dipper and a brush, he turns back to look into the blue sky above the cliffs. Yet his brush has no point. It is said that the stone carver broke the brush point by accident and spoiled the work of decades. He dropped his knife and threw himself over the cliffs. Standing on the Longmen, the lake is vast and the sky is endless. In the morning, it is an ideal place to greet the rising sun. In the evening, one can admire the sparkling lights of downtown Kunming.

The 3rd of March is a festive time in the Western Hills, when it is considered the best time for Kunming residents to climb the mountains and look into the distance, to admire the spring flowers and appreciate the feeling of new life.

=== The Sleeping Beauty ===
Local folklore describes this mountain range as a young girl with her hair drifting into the lake. Thus it is also known as "Sleeping Beauty" or "Sleeping Maiden". The lake itself is said to have formed from her tears, shed while she awaited her lover's return according to local tradition. This range is alternatively known as the "Sleeping Buddha".

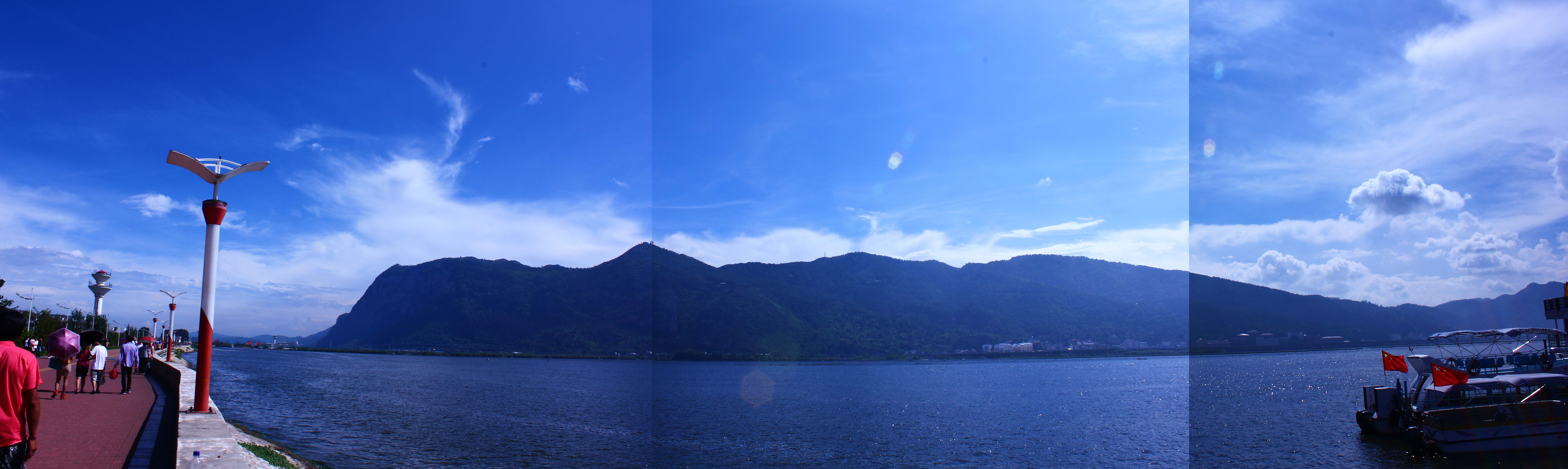
The Sleeping Beauty Range rising over the lake

=== Dragon Gate ===
Lying 15 km west of Kunming City, the Dragon Gate in the Western Hills is close to the west shore of the Dianchi Lake. It consists of the Sanqing Temple Complex and the Dragon Gate Grotto Complex.

The buildings of the Sanqing Taoist Temple are arranged in nine tiers: They are the Lingguan Hall, the Chunyang Pavilion, the Sanqing Hall, the Yuhuang Temple, the Taiqing Palace, the Zhenwu Hall, the Luzu Temple, the Qisheng Temple, Lingxiao Pavilion, the Laojun Pavilion and the Taiji Palace.

The Dragon Gate Grotto Complex includes Lanhaichu, the Ciyun Cave, the Yunhua Cave and the Datian Pavilion. The marvelous Dragon Gate Grotto Complex was accomplished through 72 years of hard work (1781–1853). The Dragon Gate consists of 3 parts: a stone archway, a platform, a stone room and a number of sculptures, all carved out of the same rock. It is both the summit of the grotto and the highlight of the grotto as well. The characters "Longmen-Dragon Gate, (the sign of the Dragon Gate)" are inscribed in red and gold upon the arch. On the left, a platform surrounded by a stone railing is the ideal place to welcome the wind and to view the bold cliff. The elevation of the Dragon Gate is over 2,300 meters, 300 meters higher than the water surface of the Dianchi Lake.

== Temples ==
The Huating Temple, the Taihua Temple, Sanqingge and Longmen were all built around the Ming and Qing dynasties. In the Taihua Mountains, old roads lead to places surrounded by trees.

The Huating Temple is famous for its colorful statues that combine styles of Buddhism and Taoism. The solemnity of Buddhism and the freedom of Taoism blend into one.

The Taihua Temple, often shrouded in mist, is 1.5 km from the Huating Temple on the main peak of the Taihua Mountains. This tranquil and isolated temple is reputed as a place of "heavenly peace". The main halls are built along the rising slopes. Covered corridors connect each pavilion and mansion. With its ancient trees, perfumed orchids, camellias, osmanthus and plum trees, the Taihua Temple is noted for its tranquility and elegance.

== Climate ==
Climate data for Taihuashan, Western Mountains, elevation 2,358 m (7,736 ft), (1991–2020 normals)
Month	Jan	Feb	Mar	Apr	May	Jun	Jul	Aug	Sep	Oct	Nov	Dec	Year
Mean daily maximum °C (°F)	13.5 (56.3)	15.9 (60.6)	19.3 (66.7)	22.1 (71.8)	22.9 (73.2)	22.6 (72.7)	21.8 (71.2)	22.0 (71.6)	20.4 (68.7)	18.1 (64.6)	15.9 (60.6)	13.2 (55.8)	19.0 (66.2)
Daily mean °C (°F)	6.8 (44.2)	8.8 (47.8)	12.0 (53.6)	14.5 (58.1)	16.0 (60.8)	17.0 (62.6)	16.9 (62.4)	16.7 (62.1)	15.2 (59.4)	12.9 (55.2)	9.7 (49.5)	6.9 (44.4)	12.8 (55.0)
Mean daily minimum °C (°F)	2.9 (37.2)	4.5 (40.1)	7.4 (45.3)	9.9 (49.8)	11.9 (53.4)	13.8 (56.8)	14.3 (57.7)	13.9 (57.0)	12.5 (54.5)	10.1 (50.2)	6.3 (43.3)	3.4 (38.1)	9.2 (48.6)
Average precipitation mm (inches)	26.2 (1.03)	13.9 (0.55)	20.7 (0.81)	30.4 (1.20)	87.3 (3.44)	193.5 (7.62)	232.0 (9.13)	213.8 (8.42)	136.7 (5.38)	93.5 (3.68)	37.5 (1.48)	16.8 (0.66)	1,102.3 (43.4)
Average snowy days	1.6	0.7	0.3	0	0	0	0	0	0	0	0.3	0.7	3.6
Average relative humidity (%)	70	60	55	59	72	86	90	89	88	88	81	78	76
Mean monthly sunshine hours	201.3	203.0	224.8	221.9	188.1	118.2	89.5	109.5	93.6	109.6	166.0	176.6	1,902.1
Percentage possible sunshine	60	63	60	58	45	29	21	27	26	31	51	54	44
Source: China Meteorological Administration

== See also ==
- List of mountain ranges in the world named The Sleeping Lady
