= Anabarilius macrolepis =

Conservation status
- Extinct (1981) (IUCN 3.1)

Scientific classification
- Kingdom: Animalia
- Phylum: Chordata
- Class: Actinopterygii
- Order: Cypriniformes
- Suborder: Cyprinoidei
- Family: Xenocyprididae
- Genus: Anabarilius
- Species: †A. macrolepis

Binomial name
- †Anabarilius macrolepis P. L. Yih & C. K. Wu, 1964
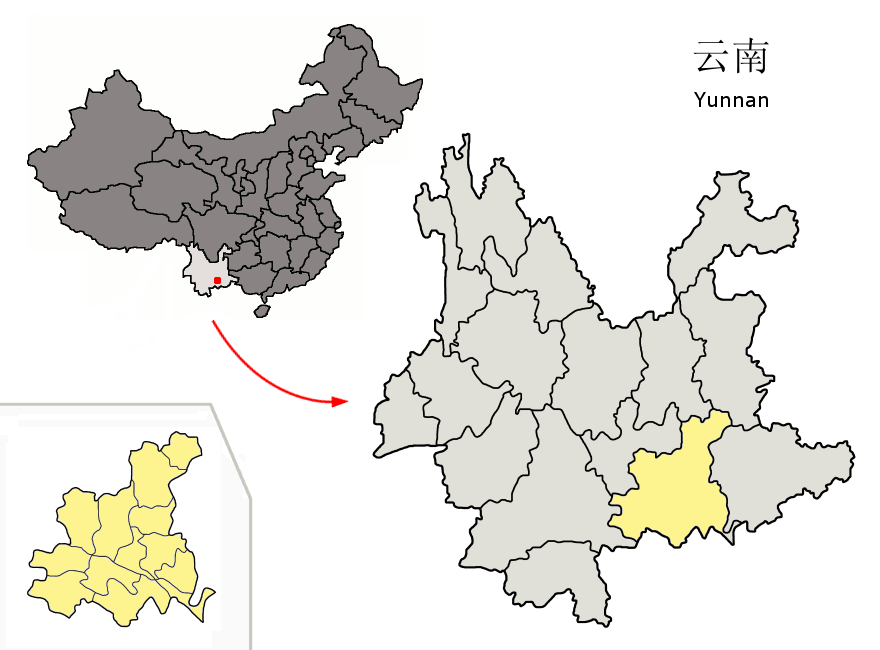
- Yilong Lake is located in Honghe Prefecture, Yunnan

Extinct species of fish

Anabarilius macrolepis is an extinct species of freshwater ray-finned fish belonging to the family Xenocyprididae, the East Asian minnows or sharpbellies. This species was endemic to Yilong Lake in Yunnan, China. It is believed that it became extinct when Yilong Lake dried up in 1981, as a result of water abstraction for agriculture. The species was not observed in 1983–84, and was declared extinct in 2011.
