= Percocypris regani =

Scientific classification
- Kingdom: Animalia
- Phylum: Chordata
- Class: Actinopterygii
- Order: Cypriniformes
- Family: Cyprinidae
- Genus: Percocypris
- Species: P. regani

Binomial name
- Percocypris regani (T. L. Tchang, 1935)

Synonyms
- Barbus regani Tchang, 1935; Percocypris pingi regani (Tchang, 1935)

Species of fish

Percocypris regani is a species of freshwater ray-finned fish belonging to the family Cyprinidae, the family which includes the carps, barbs and related fishes. It inhabits China.

The fish is named in honor of ichthyologist Charles Tate Regan (1878-1943) of the Natural History Museum in London, who among his many interests he studied the fishes of Yunnan, China.
