= Erhai Lake =

Lake in Yunnan province, southwest China

Er Lake / Erhai
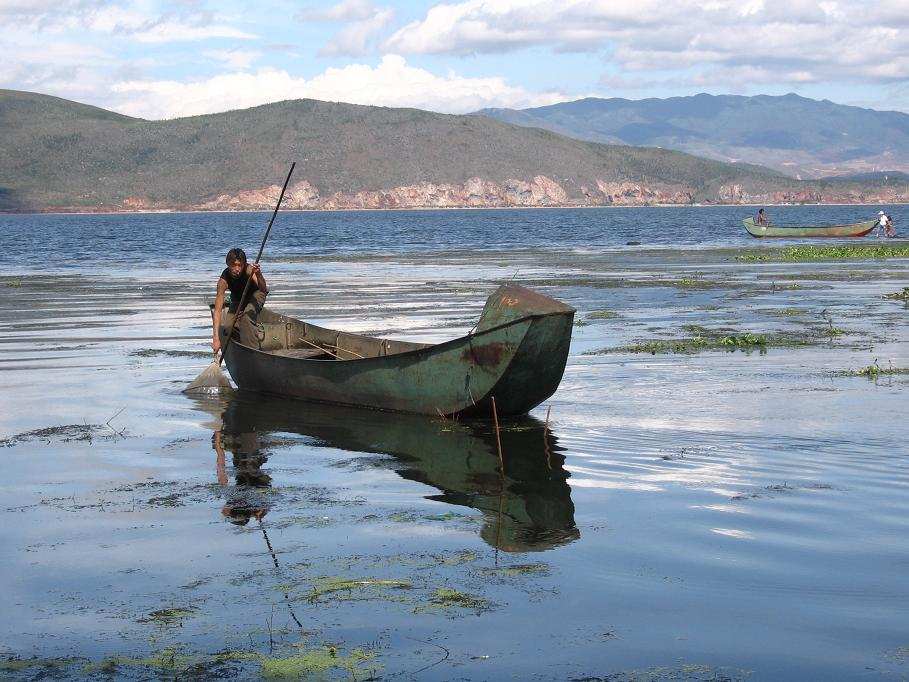

- Location within Yunnan
- Location: Dali City, Dali Prefecture, Yunnan
- Coordinates: 25°45′48″N 100°11′15″E
- Primary outflows: Xi'er River
- Basin countries: China
- Max. length: 40 km (25 mi)
- Max. width: 8 km (5.0 mi)
- Surface area: 250 km^{2} (97 sq mi)
- Average depth: 10.2 m (33 ft)
- Max. depth: 20.7 m (68 ft)
- Water volume: 2.5 km^{3} (0.60 cu mi)
- Residence time: 2.75 years
- Surface elevation: 1,972 m (6,470 ft)

Erhai or Er Lake (Chinese: 洱海; pinyin: Ěrhǎi), is an alpine fault lake in Dali City, Dali Prefecture, Yunnan province, China. Erhai was also known as Yeyuze (叶榆泽) or Kunming Lake (昆明池) in ancient times.

== Etymology ==
The character "洱" (er) does not have the same meaning as ear (耳). During the Han to Tang dynasty, there was an ancient ethnic named Kunming Yi or Kunming Barbarian (昆明夷) lived in the neighbouring region of Erhai lake. Therefore, the lake was also called "Kunming Lake". The Kunming Yi has another name Kun-mi (昆弥). In the following time, Chinese literature recorded the name "昆弥" as "昆弭" (Kun-mi) that "弭" is a rebus of "弥". And the name of the lake was also changed to the character "渳" (mi) which has a water-meaning radical (氵) attached to it. Fang Guoyu believe the name "洱" (er) was simplified from "渳", after that the name "Erhai" continues to this day.

According to Bai scholar's research, the "Yeyu" in the Chinese name "Yeyuze" (ze [泽] means lake) is evolved from Bai language which means "lower water", the pronunciation written in IPA as /jɛ^{33}ji^{33}/. In the Bai language Dali dialect, the "lower" (/jɛ^{33}/) is also pronounced /ɛɹ^{33}/. Xu Lin believe the Chinese name "洱" is evolved from /ɛɹ^{33}/.

== Geography ==
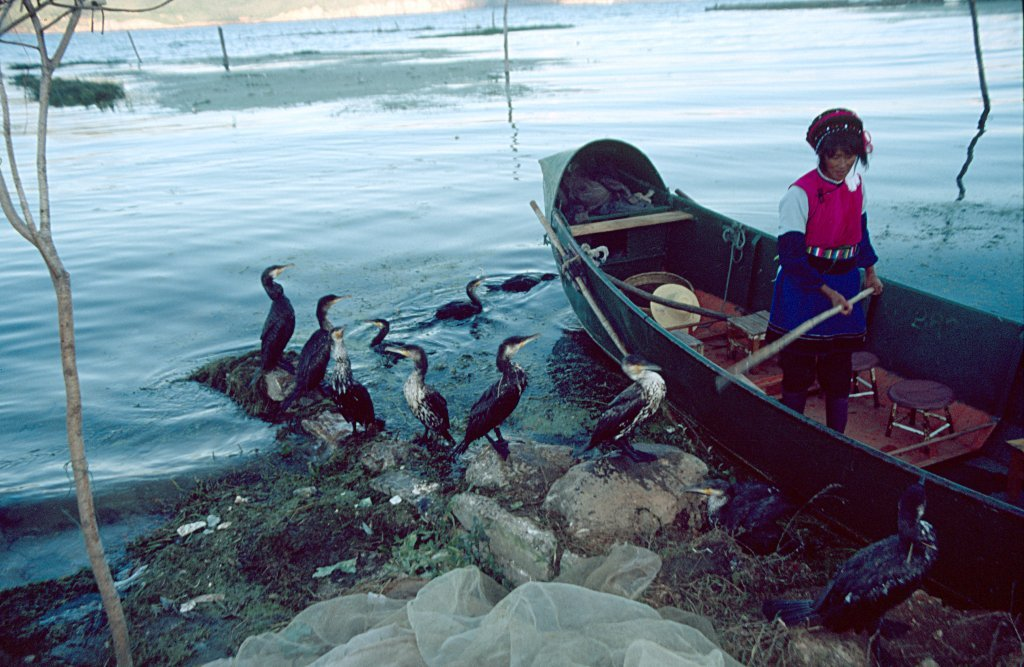
A cormorant fisherwoman returning to shore on Erhai Lake

Erhai is situated at 1,972 metres (6,470 ft) above sea level. In size, the North-South length of the lake is 40 kilometres (25 mi) and the East-West width is roughly 7–8 kilometres (4.3–5.0 mi). Its area is 250 square kilometres (97 sq mi), making it the second largest highland lake in China, after Dianchi Lake. Its circumference reaches 116 kilometres (72 mi), its average depth is of 11 metres (36 ft) and the total storage capacity of 2.5 billion cubic metres (2,000,000 acre⋅ft).

The lake serves as a backdrop to all of Dali City and sandwiches Dali Town in the west against the Cang Mountain. The lake's head is at Shangguan Town, its northern extremity, and its southernmost point is at Xiaguan Town. The lake receives water from the Miju and Mici Rivers in the north, the Bolou River in the east, and smaller streams from the Cang Mountains in the west. Yangbi River, to the south, is the lake's outlet and eventually flows into the Lancang River (Mekong River).

== Attractions ==
The lakeshore can be explored by hiking. Highlights include Erhai Park and the Butterfly Springs on the Western bank. Islands on the lake – including Guanyin Ge, Jinsuo Island (金梭岛; 'Golden Shuttle Island'), Nanzhao Folklore Island (南诏风情岛) and Xiaoputuo Island (小普陀) – are also available for visits.

The lake is an important food source for the local people (Bais), who are famous for their fishing method: their trained cormorants catch fish and return them to fishmongers. The birds are prevented from swallowing their fish by rings fixed around their neck.

== Biodiversity ==
There is, or was, a rich biodiversity in Erhai. It is one of three major Yunnan lakes with a high number of endemics, the two other being Fuxian and Dian (Dianchi). Of the 23 fish species and subspecies known from Erhai, 8 are endemic: Cyprinus barbatus, C. daliensis, C. longipectoralis, C. megalophthalmus, Paracobitis erhaiensis, Poropuntius daliensis (syn. Barbodes daliensis), P. exiguus (syn. B. exigua) and Zacco taliensis (syn. Schizothorax taliensis). Among these, only C. barbatus and C. longipectoralis have been recorded since the year 2000; the remaining have not been recorded in decades and are likely extinct. A few of the non-endemic natives have also been extirpated from the lake. In contrast, the lake is now home to more than 10 introduced fish species.

A few native hydrophytes have also disappeared from the lake.

The lake used to be a royal deer ranch for the Nanzhao Kingdom.

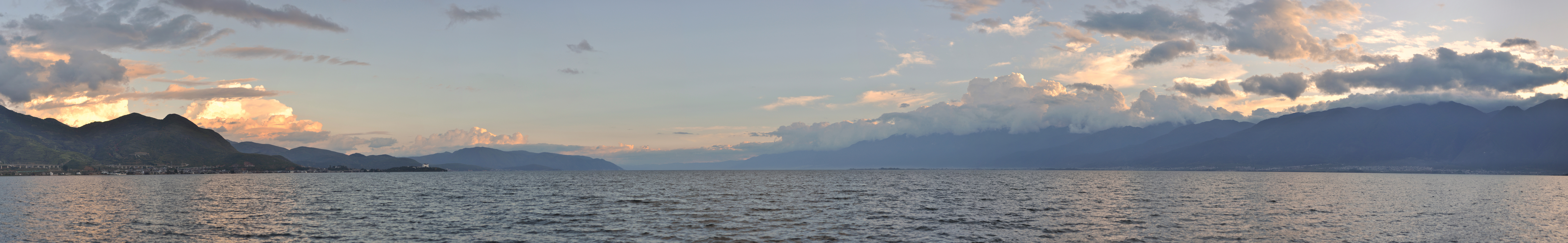
Panorama of Erhai Lake
