= Yilong Lake =

Lake in Yunnan, China

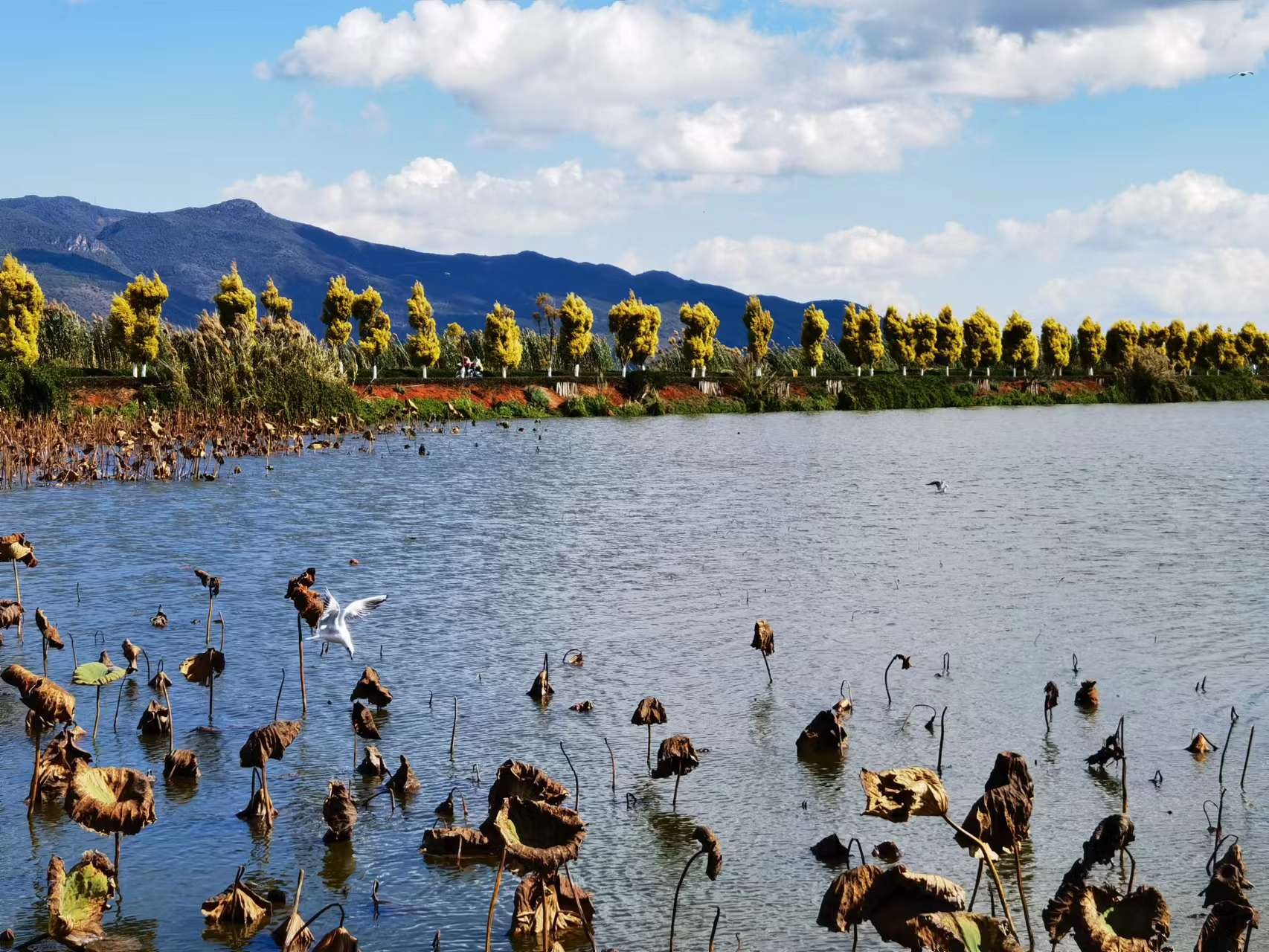
- A lakeshore view in winter (2022)

- Location within Yunnan
- Location: Shiping County, Yunnan
- Coordinates: 23.67°N 102.57°E
- Basin countries: China
- Surface area: 32 square kilometres (12 sq mi)

Yilong Lake (simplified Chinese: 异龙湖; traditional Chinese: 異龍湖; pinyin: Yìlóng Hú) is a large freshwater lake located in Shiping County, Honghe Prefecture, Yunnan province, southwestern China. The lake has a surface area of approximately 32 square kilometres (12 sq mi) and is particularly notable for its scenery, including the colorful lotus flowers that bloom on its surface. It is located about 2 kilometres (1.2 mi) east of the county seat. The people who live in the vicinity of the lake are largely of the Yi ethnic group. As of the spring of 2013 a severe drought had resulted in substantial lowering of the water level.

The lake is one of the most-visited destinations in the Yunnan–Guizhou Plateau. It used to be called Yulong Lake, an allusion to the Yulong Mountain that lies to the lake's south. The change of name has mythological reasons. It is believed that in 1629, the dragon believed to live in the lake ascended to heaven in broad daylight, prompting the change in the lake's name.

Not much is known about how the lake formed. Records tell that the lake formed during the Qin and Han dynasties. The lake is situated at an elevation of 1414 meters above sea level. It is 15 kilometers long, east to west. It is 3 kilometers wide. The lake's holds 220 million cubic meters of water. Its average depth is 4 meters.

== Fauna ==
Yilong Lake used to host the endemic fish Anabarilius macrolepis and Cyprinus yilongensis. However, the lake dried up in 1981 for 20 days as a consequence of water extraction, and they have not been seen ever since; they are now considered extinct. The shrimp Caridina yilong is also endemic to Yilong Lake and considered critically endangered, possibly extinct, because of declining lake level and pollution.

== Surrounding geography ==
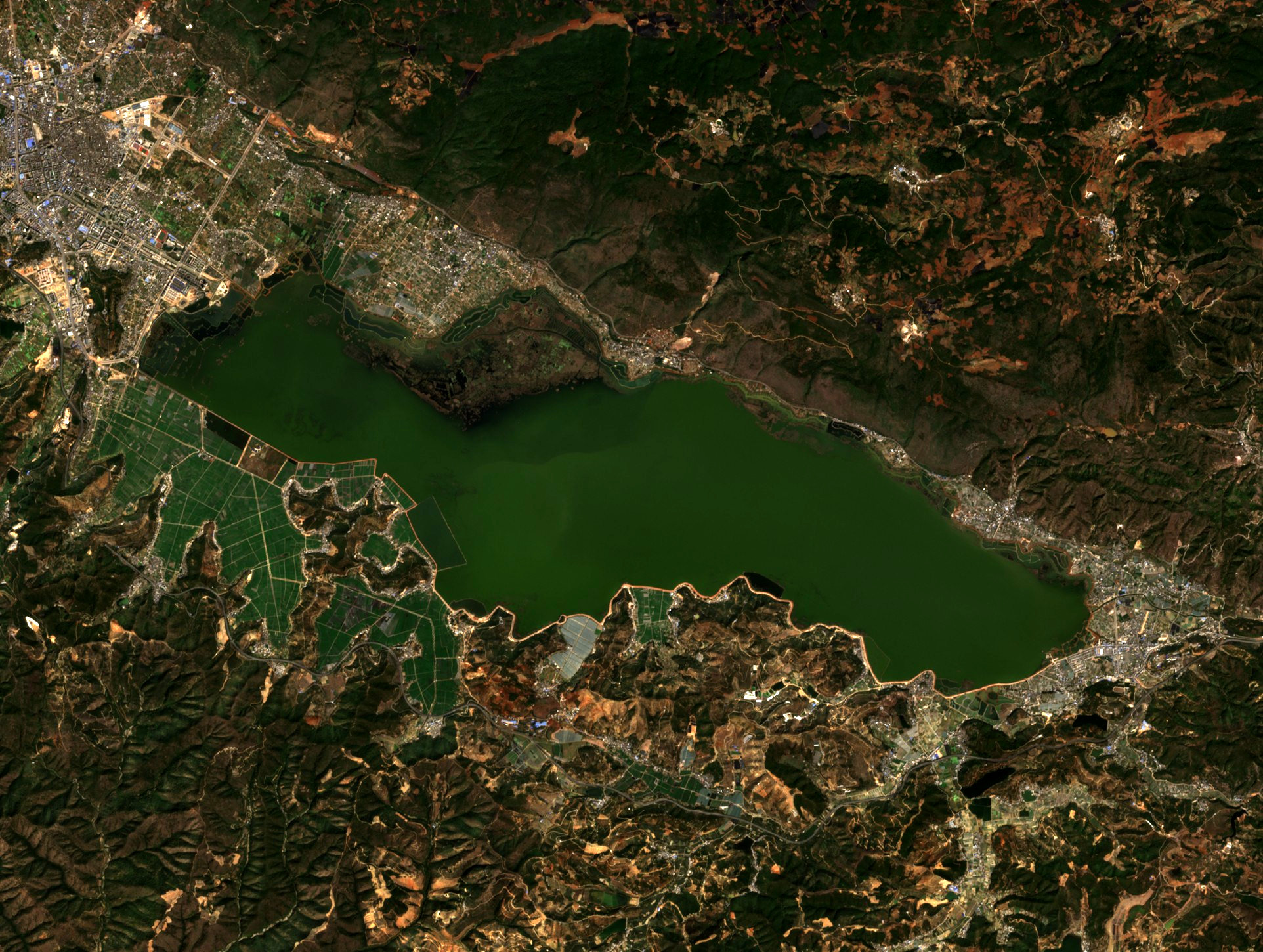
Sentinel-2 image (2019)

To the north and the south of Yulong Lake are majestic peaks, whereas the eastern and the western coasts are bound by flat and fertile land. This combination of scenic landscape and rich agricultural lands is synonymous with southern Yunnan. There are three islands in the lake: Da Rui Cheng, Xiao Rui Cheng, and Ma Ban Long. The southern shore of the last of these islands is riddled with bays, totaling, according to some accounts, an amazing 72 bays. These bays further enhance the beauty and diversity of the lake.

There are several bays within the larger bays. These small bays include Da Bay, Gao Jia Bay, Yang Jia Bay, Dou Di Bay, and five other bays. The islands and hills surrounding the lake contain fascinating structures like the Lai He Pavilion, Huan Wen Tower, Luo Se Temple, Hui Lan Cabinet, Udakacandra Temple, Guang Yin Temple and several other buildings dating back to the Qing and Ming dynasties.
