= Qilu Lake =

Lake in Yunnan, China

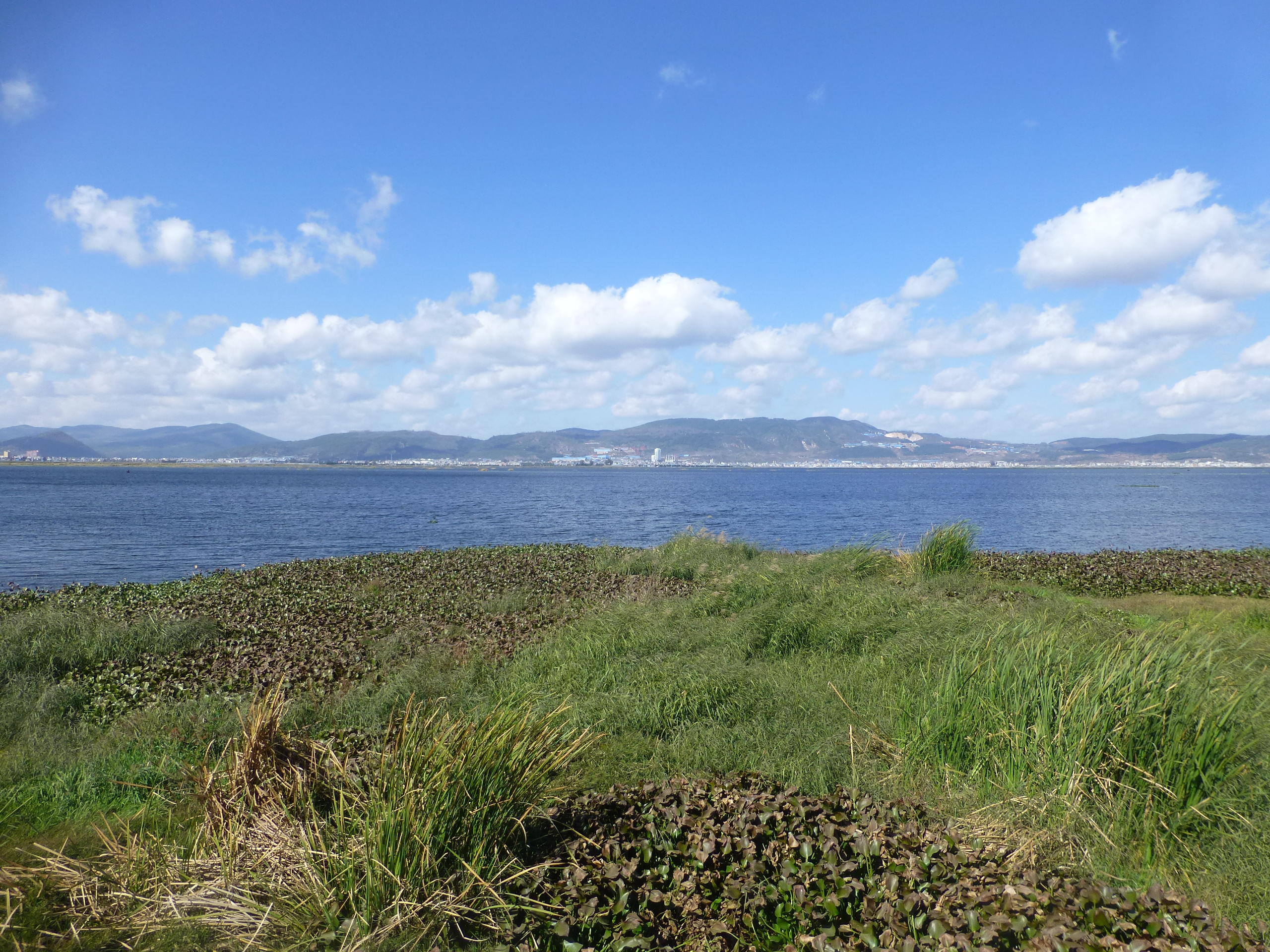

- Location within Yunnan
- Coordinates: 24°9′N 102°47′E
- Primary outflows: none
- Catchment area: 341 km^{2} (132 sq mi)
- Basin countries: China
- Max. length: 10.4 km (6 mi)
- Max. width: 4.4 km (3 mi)
- Surface area: 36.86 km^{2} (0 sq mi)
- Average depth: 4.03 m (13 ft)
- Max. depth: 6.8 m (22 ft)
- Water volume: 148.6×10^{6} m^{3} (5.25×10^{9} cu ft)
- Surface elevation: 1,796.75 m (5,895 ft)
- Settlements: Tonghai County

Qilu Lake (Chinese: 杞麓湖; pinyin: Qǐlù Hú) is a plateau lake in Yunnan Province, in southwestern China. The lake has a total area of about 36.86 square kilometers. The average depth is 4.03 m, with an elevation of 1796.75 m. the water storage capacity is about 1.486×10^{8}m^{3}.

The lake is named after the Qilu mountain (nowadays called Xiushan), directly south of Tonghai county seat. During the Yuan dynasty, the lake used to be larger and reach up to the base of this mountain. The lake has no outlet rivers, but water can leave the area through karst caves. It has a rich aquatic life, supporting a large population of shrimp, carp, black carp, herring, and catfish.

According to local legend, the area around the lake used to be flooded and was called Tonghai. A monk used a shippei to make a hole in the lake bed and allow water to flow out.

In the 20th century, the lake size was reduced due to soil erosion and land reclamation, as well as the lake becoming polluted. Since the 1990s, measures have been taken to reverse this.
