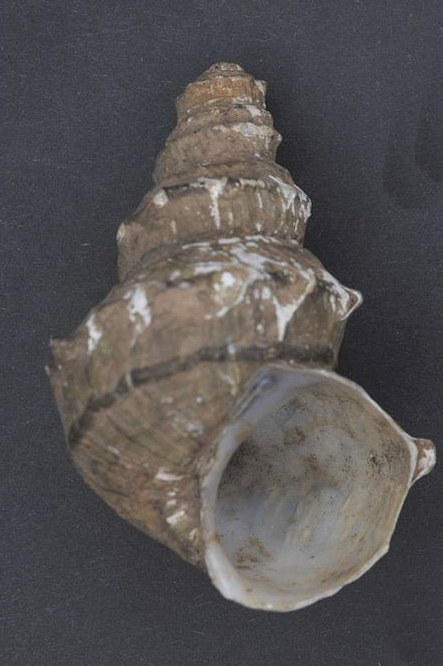
- Shell of Margarya melanioides, the type species of Margarya

Scientific classification
- Kingdom: Animalia
- Phylum: Mollusca
- Class: Gastropoda
- Subclass: Caenogastropoda
- Order: Architaenioglossa
- Family: Viviparidae
- Subfamily: Bellamyinae
- Genus: Margarya; Nevill, 1877

Diversity
- 8 species

Synonyms
- Margarya (Mabillemargarya) He, 2013; Margarya (Margarya) G. Nevill, 1877

= Margarya =

Genus of gastropods

Margarya is a genus of large operculate freshwater snails, aquatic gastropod molluscs in the family Viviparidae.

== Taxonomy ==
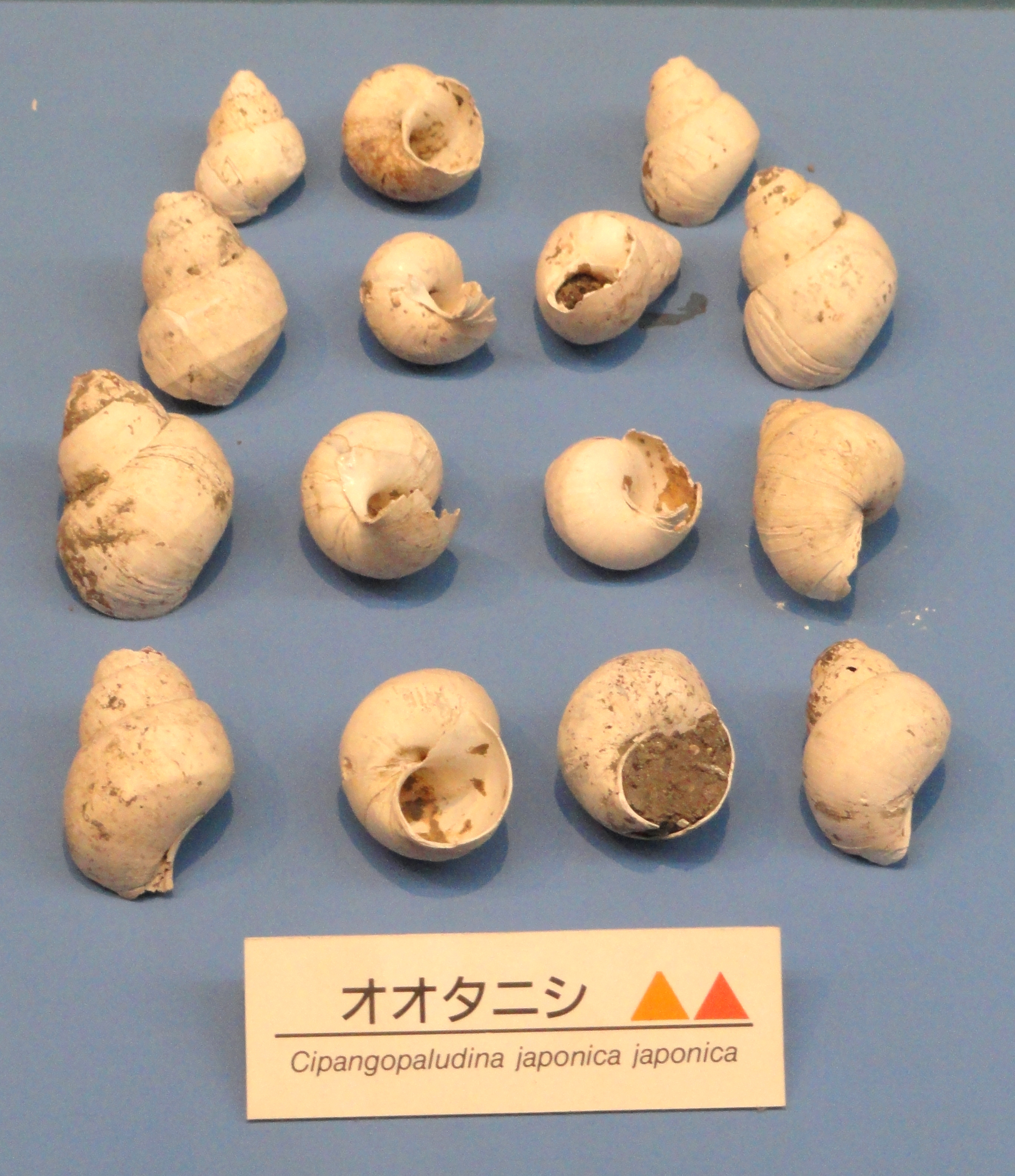
Cipangopaludina japonica

The genus Margarya was described by Nevill (1877) based on shells of the type species collected by A.R. Margary from Lake Erhai, the type locality of Margarya melanioides. Based on shell and radular morphology, Tchang & Tsi (1949) revised this genus for the first time and recognized seven distinct species. He created two subgenera of Margarya, viz Tchangmargarya and Mabillemargarya. The first molecular phylogeny showed that the genus Margarya is polyphyletic and divided into three distinct clades. Combining study of comparative morphology and molecular phylogeny, Zhang et al. revised the systematics of Margarya and recognized eight genuine extant species. However, only four species were found belonging to Margarya s. str., the rest species belonging to distinct genus Tchangmargarya or Anularya.

Cipangopaludina was a genus of freshwater snails from China, now synonymous with Margarya.

== Distribution ==
This genus appear to be endemic to Dian Lake, Erhai Lake, Cibi Lake, Jianhu Lake, Xihu Lake, and Lugu Lake in Yunnan Province in the China.

== Species ==
There are both extant and fossil species of Margarya s. str. Margarya bicostata and Margarya mansuyi are transferred to Anularya. Margarya yangtsunghaiensis is transferred to Tchangmargarya. Species within the genus Margarya include:

- Margarya cathayensis (Heude, 1890)
- Margarya catayensis. synonym: Cipangopaludina chinensis (Gray, 1834), Bellamya chinensis (Reeve 1863), Cipangopaludina wingatei - Chinese mystery snail
- (extant) Margarya francheti (Mabille, 1886)
- Margarya lecythoides (Benson, 1842)
- Margarya malleata (Reeve, 1863) - was type species of the genus Cipangopaludina
- (extant) Margarya melanioides Nevill, 1877 - type species
- Cipangopaludina miyagii Kuroda, 1941
- (extant) Margarya monodi (Dautzenberg & Fischer, 1905)
- (extant) Margarya oxytropoides (Heude, 1889)
- (fossil) Margarya spinicostata Li, 1987
- (fossil) Margarya angulata Li, 1987
- (fossil) Margarya nana Huang, 1986
- (fossil) Margarya nanningensis Tian, Fuersich & Schneider 2013

Species brought into synonymy:

- Margarya carinata (Neumayr, 1887): synonym of Margarya melanioides Nevill, 1877
- Vivipara delavayi (Mabille, 1886): synonym of Margarya melanioides Nevill, 1877
- Margarya tropidophora (Mabille, 1886): synonym of Margarya francheti (Mabille, 1886)
- Cipangopaludina dianchiensis Zhang, 1990: synonym of Margarya oxytropoides (Heude, 1889)
- Margarya melanioides dianchiensis Huang, 2007: synonym of Margarya oxytropoides (Heude, 1889)
- Margarya elongata Tchang & Tsi, 1949: synonym of Margarya monodi (Dautzenberg & H. Fischer, 1905)
- Margarya tchangsii Xia, 1982: synonym of Margarya monodi (Dautzenberg & H. Fischer, 1905)
- Margarya yangtsunghaiensis Tchang & Tsi, 1949: synonym of Tchangmargarya yangtsunghaiensis (Tchang & Tsi, 1949)
- Margarya yini (Tchang & Tsi, 1982): synonym of Margarya monodi (Dautzenberg & H. Fischer, 1905)

== Cladogram ==
The cladogram based on sequences of mitochondrial 16S ribosomal RNA and cytochrome-c oxidase I (COI), and nuclear ITS2 genes showing the phylogenic relationships of the genus Margarya indicates that Margarya is polyphyletic. Margarya as traditionally delimited decayed into three distinct clades. The sister lineages of two of these clades are representatives from different viviparid genera, which are widely distributed in East and Southeast Asian rivers and lakes. These predominantly riparian viviparids also differ markedly in their shell morphology. Herein only genus-level phylogenic relationship is given, whereas relationship between lower taxonomic units deserve further study.

- Margarya and related Viviparidae
  - Tchangmargarya yangtsunghaiensis and Tchangmargarya multilabiata
  - - - Anularya bicostata and Anularya mansuyi
      - - Mekongia sp. and Sinotaia spp.
    - - Margarya spp.
