= Yunnanilus macrogaster =

Conservation status
- Data Deficient (IUCN 3.1)

Scientific classification
- Kingdom: Animalia
- Phylum: Chordata
- Class: Actinopterygii
- Order: Cypriniformes
- Family: Nemacheilidae
- Genus: Yunnanilus
- Species: Y. macrogaster

Binomial name
- Yunnanilus macrogaster Kottelat & X. L. Chu, 1988

Species of fish

Yunnanilus macrogaster is a hypogean species of stone loach endemic to China. This species is endemic to the endorheic drainage system which feeds the Datangzi Marsh in Luoping County, Yunnan, the marsh has been formed by the outflow of a stream from its underground course. It is a demersal species and the waters where it was found were densely vegetated, it feeds on worms and insects. It is sympatric with Yunnanilus niger and Y, paludosus, forming a small species flock. It lays eggs which it does not guard.

Yunnanilus macrogaster has a moderately elongated and compressed body with a short lateral line which has 6–10 pores and a line of pores on the head. The caudal peduncle is around 1.4 times as long as it is deep and its eyes have a diameter of slightly less than one-fifth of the head length. It grows to a standard length of 63.2 mm. The body is yellowish with an irregular pattern of brown spots on its back and flanks with the dorsal surface of the head being darker and there is a dark patch on the operculum to the rear of the eye. The fins are hyaline and the caudal fin has a vertical black bar at its base but this does not extend to the upper and lower edges of the caudal peduncle. It shows no adaptations to living in caves.

The specific name macrogaster means "large stomach", referring to the swollen bellied appearance of this species.
