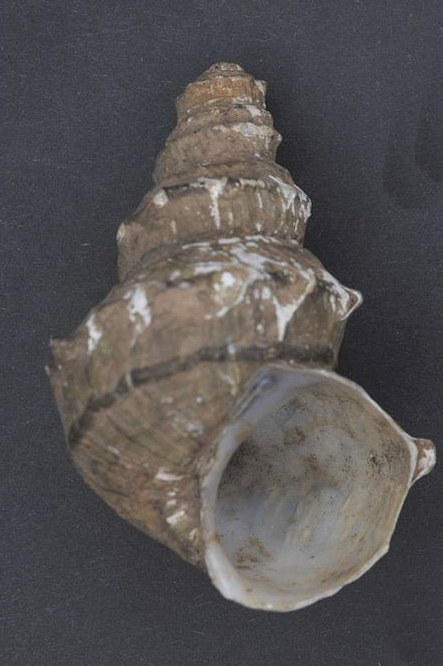
- Apertural view of a shell of Margarya melanioides.

Conservation status
- Endangered (IUCN 3.1)

Scientific classification
- Kingdom: Animalia
- Phylum: Mollusca
- Class: Gastropoda
- Subclass: Caenogastropoda
- Order: Architaenioglossa
- Family: Viviparidae
- Genus: Margarya
- Species: M. melanioides

Binomial name
- Margarya melanioides Nevill, 1877

Synonyms
- Margarya melanoides (spelling error); Margarya melanioides carinata Neumayr; Margarya melanoides delavayi Mabille; Vivipara delavayi Mabille, 1886; Paludina margeriana Anderson, 1878; Vivipara (Tulotoma) margeriana Neumayr, 1883; Vivipara (Tulotoma) margeriana var. tuberculata Neumayr, 1883

= Margarya melanioides =

Species of gastropod

Margarya melanioides is a species of large operculate freshwater snail, an aquatic gastropod mollusc in the family Viviparidae, the river snails.

Margarya melanioides is the type species of the genus Margarya.

== Distribution ==
The distribution of Margarya melanioides includes Dian Lake, Erhai Lake, Jianhu Lake, Xihu Lake, and Cibi Lake in Yunnan Province, China. Former records in Daduitai Lake and Xingyun Lake are considered as a result of the mix-up of species name.

An average population density was 36 individuals per square meter in Dianchi Lake in 1940s, 0.7 individuals per square meter in 1990s and 0.068 individuals per square meter in Dianchi Lake in 2012.

According to the population ecology research by Song et al. (2013), the population of will collapse in the Dian Lake in 2015.

== Description ==
The width of the shell is up to 64.3 mm (2.53 in). The height of the shell is up to 94.7 mm (3.73 in).

Shu et al. (2010) provided details about the shell and about the radula.

The diploid chromosome number of Margarya melanioides is 2n=18.

== Ecology ==
Margarya melanioides is a dioecious species. Females are ovoviviparous and one female lay 5-6 eggs per year. The newborn shell is about 8 mm (0.31 in) in height. The snail will reach maturity in one year in a shell height about 30 mm (1.2 in).

The lifespan is 3–4 years.

== Human use ==
This species is extensively harvested as a human food source, but harvesting is one of its threats.
