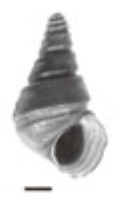
- Apertural view of the shell of Anularya mansuyi. Scale bar is 1 cm.

Scientific classification
- Kingdom: Animalia
- Phylum: Mollusca
- Class: Gastropoda
- Subclass: Caenogastropoda
- Order: Architaenioglossa
- Family: Viviparidae
- Subfamily: Bellamyinae
- Genus: Anularya; Zhang & Chen, 2015

Diversity
- 2 species

= Anularya =

Genus of gastropods

Anularya is a genus of large operculate freshwater snails, aquatic gastropod molluscs in the family Viviparidae.

== Distribution ==
The extant species of this genus appear to be endemic to Fuxian Lake, Xingyun Lake, Qilu Lake, Datun Lake and Changqiao Lake in Yunnan Province in the China.

== Species ==
There are 2 extant species of Anularya, previously assigned to Margarya:

- Anularya mansuyi (Dautzenberg & Fischer, 1905) - type species
- Anularya bicostata (Tchang & Tsi, 1949)
