= Yunnanilus tigerivinus =

Scientific classification
- Domain: Eukaryota
- Kingdom: Animalia
- Phylum: Chordata
- Class: Actinopterygii
- Order: Cypriniformes
- Family: Nemacheilidae
- Genus: Yunnanilus
- Species: Y. tigerivinus

Binomial name
- Yunnanilus tigerivinus Li & Duan, 1999

Species of fish

Yunnanilus tigerivinus is a species of stone loach which is endemic to China. Its type locality is an opening of an underground channel in a suburb of Kunming in Yunnan. Some authorities consider Y. tigerivinus to be a junior synonym of Yunnanilus pleurotaenia .
