= Yunnanilus macrolepis =

Scientific classification
- Domain: Eukaryota
- Kingdom: Animalia
- Phylum: Chordata
- Class: Actinopterygii
- Order: Cypriniformes
- Family: Nemacheilidae
- Genus: Yunnanilus
- Species: Y. macrolepis

Binomial name
- Yunnanilus macrolepis W. X. Li, Tao & W. N. Mao, 2000

Species of fish

Yunnanilus macrolepis is a species of stone loach which is endemic to China. Its type locality is Luoping County in Yunnan. Some authorities consider Y. macrolepis to be a junior synonym of Yunnanilus paludosus.
