= Petruichthys salmonides =

Scientific classification
- Kingdom: Animalia
- Phylum: Chordata
- Class: Actinopterygii
- Order: Cypriniformes
- Family: Nemacheilidae
- Genus: Petruichthys
- Species: P. salmonides

Binomial name
- Petruichthys salmonides (B. L. Chaudhuri, 1911)

Synonyms
- Nemachilus salmonides B. L. Chaudhuri, 1911

Species of fish

Petruichthys salmonides is a little known species of freshwater ray-finned fish belonging to the family Nemacheilidae, the stone loaches. It is known only from the holotype which was collected at "Mongpan" in southern Yunnan and described by B. L. Chaudhuri. It has been considered to be a synonym of Yunnanilus pleurotaenia but Yunnanilus fishes have restricted distributions that are disjunct from the given type locality of this species and Chaudhuri's original description does not match any Yunnanilus species. This species has been regarded as a species inquirenda but Eschmeyer's Catalog of Fishes treats it as a valid recognised species within Petruichthys.
