= Anabarilius yangzonensis =

Conservation status
- Critically endangered, possibly extinct (IUCN 3.1)

Scientific classification
- Kingdom: Animalia
- Phylum: Chordata
- Class: Actinopterygii
- Order: Cypriniformes
- Family: Xenocyprididae
- Genus: Anabarilius
- Species: A. yangzonensis

Binomial name
- Anabarilius yangzonensis Y. R. Chen & X. L. Chu, 1980

Species of fish

Anabarilius yangzonensis is a species of freshwater ray-finned fish belonging to the family Xenocyprididae, the East Asian minnows or sharpbellies. This species is currently critically endangered by the International Union for Conservation of Nature. A. yangzonensis is endemic to Yangzong Lake of Yunnan, China.
