= Anabarilius andersoni =

Conservation status
- Critically Endangered (IUCN 3.1)

Scientific classification
- Kingdom: Animalia
- Phylum: Chordata
- Class: Actinopterygii
- Order: Cypriniformes
- Suborder: Cyprinoidei
- Family: Xenocyprididae
- Genus: Anabarilius
- Species: A. andersoni

Binomial name
- Anabarilius andersoni (Regan, 1904)

Synonyms
- Barilius andersoni Regan, 1904; Ischikauia andersoni (Regan, 1904)

Species of fish

Anabarilius andersoni is a species of freshwater ray-finned fish belonging to the family Xenocyprididae, the East Asian minnows or sharpbellies. This species is endemic to China. It is a pelagic species only known from Xingyun Lake in Yunnan, and its population is severely impacted by domestic pollution and overfishing.
