= Anabarilius maculatus =

Conservation status
- Data Deficient (IUCN 3.1)

Scientific classification
- Kingdom: Animalia
- Phylum: Chordata
- Class: Actinopterygii
- Order: Cypriniformes
- Suborder: Cyprinoidei
- Family: Xenocyprididae
- Genus: Anabarilius
- Species: A. maculatus

Binomial name
- Anabarilius maculatus Y. R. Chen & X. L. Chu, 1980

Species of fish

Anabarilius maculatus is a species of freshwater ray-finned fish belonging to the family Xenocyprididae, the East Asian minnows or sharpbellies. It is endemic to the Nan Pan Jiang basin in Yunnan, southern China. It is threatened by invasive non-native species, domestic and urban waste water, agricultural pollution and dams. The species has not been studied well, and therefore is ranked as Data Deficient. It grows to 13.9 cm (5.5 in) standard length.
