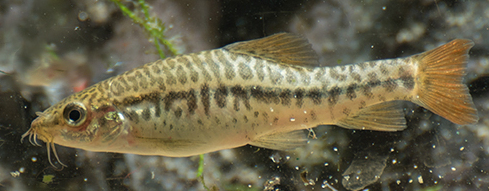

Conservation status
- Vulnerable (IUCN 3.1)

Scientific classification
- Kingdom: Animalia
- Phylum: Chordata
- Class: Actinopterygii
- Order: Cypriniformes
- Family: Nemacheilidae
- Genus: Petruichthys
- Species: P. brevis

Binomial name
- Petruichthys brevis (Boulenger, 1893)

Synonyms
- Nemachilus brevis Boulenger, 1893; Yunnanilus brevis (Boulenger, 1893)

= Petruichthys brevis =

Species of fish

Petruichthys brevis, common name Inle loach, is one of two species of ray-finned fish in the genus Petruichthys, although some authorities place it in the genus Yunnanilus. It is only found in Inle Lake and the adjacent He-Ho Plain in the Southern Shan States in Myanmar. It is a demersal fish which occurs in still and slow running waters as well as in a shallow lake, with dense submerged and floating vegetation.
