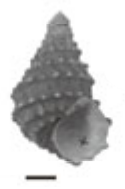
- Shell of Tchangmargarya yangtsunghaiensis

Conservation status
- Critically endangered, possibly extinct (IUCN 3.1)

Scientific classification
- Kingdom: Animalia
- Phylum: Mollusca
- Class: Gastropoda
- Subclass: Caenogastropoda
- Order: Architaenioglossa
- Family: Viviparidae
- Genus: Tchangmargarya
- Species: T. yangtsunghaiensis

Binomial name
- Tchangmargarya yangtsunghaiensis (Tchang & Tsi, 1949)

Synonyms
- Margarya yangtsunghaiensis Tchang & Tsi, 1949

= Tchangmargarya yangtsunghaiensis =

Species of gastropod

Tchangmargarya yangtsunghaiensis is a species of large operculate freshwater snail, an aquatic gastropod mollusc in the family Viviparidae, the river snails.

This species used to be assigned to Margarya, and is the type species of Tchangmargarya.

== Distribution ==
The distribution of Tchangmargarya yangtsunghaiensis includes Yangzong Lake in Yunnan Province, China.

== Description ==
The diploid chromosome number of Tchangmargarya yangtsunghaiensis is 2n=24. Zhang et al. (2015) provided details about the shell and about the radula.
