= Yunnanilus analis =

Scientific classification
- Kingdom: Animalia
- Phylum: Chordata
- Class: Actinopterygii
- Order: Cypriniformes
- Family: Nemacheilidae
- Genus: Yunnanilus
- Species: Y. analis

Binomial name
- Yunnanilus analis J. X. Yang, 1990

Species of fish

Yunnanilus analis is a species of ray-finned fish, a stone loach, in the genus Yunnanilus. The type locality is Xingyun Lake in Yunnan, southern China. The specific name analis means "of the anus" and refers to the six branched rays in the anal fin, a unique feature among the species classified under Yunnanilus.
