= Eonemachilus yangzonghaiensis =

Conservation status
- Critically Endangered (IUCN 3.1)

Scientific classification
- Kingdom: Animalia
- Phylum: Chordata
- Class: Actinopterygii
- Order: Cypriniformes
- Family: Nemacheilidae
- Genus: Eonemachilus
- Species: E. yangzonghaiensis

Binomial name
- Eonemachilus yangzonghaiensis (W.-X. Cao & S.-Q. Zhu, 1989)

Synonyms
- Yunnanilus yangzonghaiensis W.-X. Cao & S.-Q. Zhu, 1989

Species of fish

Eonemachilus yangzonghaiensis is a species of freshwater ray-finned fish, a stone loach, in the genus Eonemachilus. It is endemic to China and its type locality is Yangzong Lake in Yunnan. This species has been placed in the genus Eonemachilus.
