= Anabarilius qiluensis =

Conservation status
- Critically endangered, possibly extinct (IUCN 3.1)

Scientific classification
- Kingdom: Animalia
- Phylum: Chordata
- Class: Actinopterygii
- Order: Cypriniformes
- Suborder: Cyprinoidei
- Family: Xenocyprididae
- Genus: Anabarilius
- Species: A. qiluensis

Binomial name
- Anabarilius qiluensis Y. R. Chen & X. L. Chu, 1980

Synonyms
- Anabarilius andersoni qiluensis Chen & Chu, 1980

Species of fish

Anabarilius qiluensis is a species of freshwater ray-finned fish belonging to the family Xenocyprididae, the East Asian minnows or sharpbellies. This species is endemic to Qilu Lake in Yunnan, but it has not been recorded from that site since the early 1980s. Surveys conducted in 1983-84 failed to find this fish. In 1964, alien fish were introduced into the lake and prevented this species from reproducing, leading to its decline. The International Union for Conservation of Nature considers this species to be Critically Endangered, Possibly Extinct.
