= Eonemachilus pachycephalus =

Conservation status
- Least Concern (IUCN 3.1)

Scientific classification
- Kingdom: Animalia
- Phylum: Chordata
- Class: Actinopterygii
- Order: Cypriniformes
- Family: Nemacheilidae
- Genus: Eonemachilus
- Species: E. pachycephalus

Binomial name
- Eonemachilus pachycephalus (Kottelat & X. L. Chu, 1988)

Synonyms
- Yunnanilus pachycephalus Kottelat & X. L. Chu, 1988

Species of fish

Eonemachilus pachycephalus is a species of ray-finned fish in the genus Eonemachilus. It is a small (8.3 cm (3.3 in) SL) stream-dwelling fish known only from its type locality, the Weizhangho stream, Yangliu, Yunnan, China.
