= Anabarilius =

Scientific classification
- Kingdom: Animalia
- Phylum: Chordata
- Class: Actinopterygii
- Order: Cypriniformes
- Family: Xenocyprididae
- Genus: Anabarilius; Cockerell, 1923

Type species
- Barilius andersoni Regan, 1904

Synonyms
- Nicholsiculter Rendahl, 1928; Rohanus Y. T. Chu, 1935

Genus of fishes

Anabarilius is a genus of freshwater ray-finned fish belonging to the family Xenocyprididae, the East Asian minnows or sharpbellies, most of them only occurring in the area of China. Many of the species have very restricted geographic range and have been negatively impacted by introduced species, fishing, and habitat degradation; the IUCN Red List includes five Anabarilius species that are either endangered or critically endangered and one species (A. macrolepis) that is considered extinct.

== Species ==
The genus contains the following species:

- Anabarilius alburnops (Regan, 1914)
- Anabarilius andersoni (Regan, 1904)
- Anabarilius brevianalis W. Zhou & G. H. Cui, 1992
- Anabarilius duoyiheensis W. X. Li, W. N. Mao & Zong-Min Lu, 2002
- Anabarilius goldenlineus W. X. Li & A. L. Chen, 1995
- Anabarilius grahami (Regan, 1908) (Kanglang fish)
- Anabarilius liui (H. W. Chang, 1944)
- Anabarilius longicaudatus Y. R. Chen, 1986
- †Anabarilius macrolepis P. L. Yih & C. K. Wu, 1964
- Anabarilius maculatus Y. R. Chen & X. L. Chu, 1980
- Anabarilius paucirastellus P. Q. Yue & J. C. He, 1988
- Anabarilius polylepis (Regan, 1904)
- Anabarilius qiluensis Y. R. Chen & X. L. Chu, 1980
- †Anabarilius qionghaiensis Y. R. Chen, 1986
- Anabarilius songmingensis Y. R. Chen & X. L. Chu, 1980
- Anabarilius transmontanus (Nichols, 1925)
- Anabarilius xundianensis J. C. He, 1984
- Anabarilius yangzonensis Y. R. Chen & X. L. Chu, 1980

† = extinct
