= Eonemachilus =

Scientific classification
- Kingdom: Animalia
- Phylum: Chordata
- Class: Actinopterygii
- Order: Cypriniformes
- Family: Nemacheilidae
- Genus: Eonemachilus; Berg, 1938

Type species
- Nemacheilus nigromaculatus Regan, 1904

Genus of fishes

Eonemachilus is a genus of ray-finned fish belonging to the family Nemacheilidae, the stone loaches. The fishes in this genus are found in China.

== Species ==
Eonemachilus contains the following species:

- Eonemachilus altus (Kottelat & X. L. Chu, 1988)
- Eonemachilus bajiangensis (W. X. Li, 2004)
- Eonemachilus caohaiensis (R. H. Ding, 1992)
- Eonemachilus longidorsalis (W. X. Li, Tao & Z.-M. Lu, 2000)
- Eonemachilus niger (Kottelat & Chu, 1988)
- Eonemachilus nigromaculatus (Regan, 1904)
- Eonemachilus obtusirostris (J. X. Yang, 1995)
- Eonemachilus pachycephalus (Kottelat & Chu, 1988)
- Eonemachilus yangzonghaiensis (W.-X. Cao & S.-Q. Zhu, 1989)
