= Eonemachilus niger =

Conservation status
- Endangered (IUCN 3.1)

Scientific classification
- Kingdom: Animalia
- Phylum: Chordata
- Class: Actinopterygii
- Order: Cypriniformes
- Family: Nemacheilidae
- Genus: Eonemachilus
- Species: E. niger

Binomial name
- Eonemachilus niger (Kottelat & X. L. Chu, 1988)

Synonyms
- Yunnanilus niger Kottelat & Chu, 1988

Species of fish

Yunnanilus niger is a hypogean species of stone loach endemic to China. This species is endemic to the endorheic drainage system which feeds the Datangzi Marsh in Luoping County, Yunnan,
