= Cibi (disambiguation) =

The Cibi is a Fijian war dance, now performed at rugby matches.

Cibi or CIBI may also refer to:

- CIBI Information, Inc., a credit rating company in the Philippines
- Cibi Lake, Yunnan province, China, a lake
