= Anabarilius duoyiheensis =

Scientific classification
- Kingdom: Animalia
- Phylum: Chordata
- Class: Actinopterygii
- Order: Cypriniformes
- Suborder: Cyprinoidei
- Family: Xenocyprididae
- Genus: Anabarilius
- Species: A. duoyiheensis

Binomial name
- Anabarilius duoyiheensis W. X. Li, W. N. Mao & Zong-Min Lu, 2002

Species of fish

Anabarilius duoyiheensis is a species of freshwater ray-finned fish belonging to the family Xenocyprididae, the East Asian minnows or sharpbellies. This species is known only from Luoping County in Yunnan Province.
