= Yunnanilus forkicaudalis =

Scientific classification
- Domain: Eukaryota
- Kingdom: Animalia
- Phylum: Chordata
- Class: Actinopterygii
- Order: Cypriniformes
- Family: Nemacheilidae
- Genus: Yunnanilus
- Species: Y. forkicaudalis

Binomial name
- Yunnanilus forkicaudalis W. X. Li, 1999

Species of fish

Yunnanilus forkicaudalis is a species of stone loach which is endemic to China. Its type locality is Lunan County, Heilongtan in Yunnan. Some authorities consider Y. forkicaudalis to be a junior synonym of Yunnanilus macrositanus.
