= Yunnanilus parvus =

Conservation status
- Data Deficient (IUCN 3.1)

Scientific classification
- Kingdom: Animalia
- Phylum: Chordata
- Class: Actinopterygii
- Order: Cypriniformes
- Family: Nemacheilidae
- Genus: Yunnanilus
- Species: Y. parvus

Binomial name
- Yunnanilus parvus Kottelat & X. L. Chu, 1988

Species of fish

Yunnanilus parvus is a species of ray-finned fish, a stone loach, in the genus Yunnanilus. The type locality of this species is given as Nan Tong, in Kaihuan County, Yunnan, China. However, when research was carried out to find these locations it was not possible to find the precise location of either place. It was described as being found in a cave outlet and feeding on detritus.
