= Eonemachilus longidorsalis =

Conservation status
- Vulnerable (IUCN 3.1)

Scientific classification
- Kingdom: Animalia
- Phylum: Chordata
- Class: Actinopterygii
- Order: Cypriniformes
- Family: Nemacheilidae
- Genus: Eonemachilus
- Species: E. longidorsalis

Binomial name
- Eonemachilus longidorsalis (W. X. Li, Tao & Z.-M. Lu, 2000)

Synonyms
- Yunnanilus longidorsalis Li, Tao & Lu, 2000

Species of fish

Eonemachilus longidorsalis is a species of freshwater ray-finned fish belonging to the family Nemacheilidae, the stone loaches. This species is known from a single spring in the pool in Agang Town in Luoping County, Yunnan.
