= Eonemachilus obtusirostris =

Conservation status
- Critically Endangered (IUCN 3.1)

Scientific classification
- Kingdom: Animalia
- Phylum: Chordata
- Class: Actinopterygii
- Order: Cypriniformes
- Family: Nemacheilidae
- Genus: Eonemachilus
- Species: E. obtusirostris

Binomial name
- Eonemachilus obtusirostris J. X. Yang, 1995

Synonyms
- Yunnanilus obtusirostris J. X. Yang, 1995

Species of fish

Eonemachilus obtusirostris is a species of ray-finned fish, a stone loach in the genus Eonemachilus. Its type locality is the West Dragon Spring, which flows into Fuxian Lake in Chengjiang County, Yunnan. In the past this species was classified in the genus Yunnanilus, although it was thought that it may have been in Heminoemacheilus rather than Yunnanilus. The specific name is a compound of the Latin rostrum meaning a "beak" and obtusus meaning "blunt", this refers to the species' short snout.
