= Yunnanilus niulanensis =

Scientific classification
- Kingdom: Animalia
- Phylum: Chordata
- Class: Actinopterygii
- Order: Cypriniformes
- Family: Nemacheilidae
- Genus: Yunnanilus
- Species: Y. niulanensis

Binomial name
- Yunnanilus niulanensis Z. M. Chen, J. Yang & J. X. Yang, 2012

Species of fish

Yunnanilus niulanensis is a species of freshwater ray-finned fish, a stone loach from the genus Yunnanilus. Its type locality is the Yanglinhe River in Songming County in Yunnan. The specific name refers to the Niulanjiang River, in the Yangtze basin, of which the Yanglinhe is a tributary.
