= Yunnanilus chui =

Scientific classification
- Kingdom: Animalia
- Phylum: Chordata
- Class: Actinopterygii
- Order: Cypriniformes
- Family: Nemacheilidae
- Genus: Yunnanilus
- Species: Y. chui

Binomial name
- Yunnanilus chui J. X. Yang, 1991

Species of fish

Yunnanilus chui is a species of ray-finned fish, a stone loach, in the genus Yunnanilus. The specific name honours the ichthyologist Chu Xin-Luo. The type locality for this species is Fuxian Lake at Haikou, Hainan in China.
