= Yunnanilus ganheensis =

Scientific classification
- Kingdom: Animalia
- Phylum: Chordata
- Class: Actinopterygii
- Order: Cypriniformes
- Family: Nemacheilidae
- Genus: Yunnanilus
- Species: Y. ganheensis

Binomial name
- Yunnanilus ganheensis L. An, B. S. Liu & W. X. Li, 2009

Species of fish

Yunnanilus ganheensis is a species of freshwater ray-finned fish, a stone loach in the genus Yunnanilus. The type locality is Ganhe in Xundan County in Yunnan and the specific name refers to that location.
