= Yunnanilus nanpanjiangensis =

Scientific classification
- Kingdom: Animalia
- Phylum: Chordata
- Class: Actinopterygii
- Order: Cypriniformes
- Family: Nemacheilidae
- Genus: Yunnanilus
- Species: Y. nanpanjiangensis

Binomial name
- Yunnanilus nanpanjiangensis W. X. Li, W. N. Mao & Zong-Min Lu, 1994

Species of fish

Yunnanilus nanpanjiangensis is a species of ray-finned fish, a stone loach, in the genus Yunnanilus. It is endemic to China and uts type locality is near Agang Town, Luoping County, Yunnan and the specific name refers to the Nanpanjiang River.
