= Anabarilius songmingensis =

Scientific classification
- Kingdom: Animalia
- Phylum: Chordata
- Class: Actinopterygii
- Order: Cypriniformes
- Suborder: Cyprinoidei
- Family: Xenocyprididae
- Genus: Anabarilius
- Species: A. songmingensis

Binomial name
- Anabarilius songmingensis Y. R. Chen & X. L. Chu, 1980

Species of fish

Anabarilius songmingensis is a species of freshwater ray-finned fish belonging to the family Xenocyprididae, the East Asian minnows or sharpbellies. This species is only known from southwest China, in the Yangtze river basin.
