= Tchangmargarya =

Scientific classification
- Kingdom: Animalia
- Phylum: Mollusca
- Class: Gastropoda
- Subclass: Caenogastropoda
- Order: Architaenioglossa
- Family: Viviparidae
- Subfamily: Bellamyinae
- Genus: Tchangmargarya; He, 2013

Diversity
- 2 species

Synonyms
- Margarya (Tchangmargarya) He, 2013

Genus of gastropods

Tchangmargarya is a genus of large operculate freshwater snails, aquatic gastropod molluscs in the family Viviparidae.

== Taxonomy ==
Tchangmargarya originally was a subgenus of Margarya, and is elevated to a full genus based on molecular phylogeny and comparative morphology study.

== Distribution ==
This genus appear to be endemic to Yangzong Lake and lakes in Stone Forest in Yunnan Province in the China.

== Species ==
There are 3 extant species of Tchangmargarya:

- Tchangmargarya yangtsunghaiensis (Tchang & Tsi, 1949) -type species (possibly extinct)
- Tchangmargarya multilabiata Zhang & Chen, 2015
- Tchangmargarya ziyi Zhang, 2017 (possibly extinct)
