= Eonemachilus altus =

Scientific classification
- Domain: Eukaryota
- Kingdom: Animalia
- Phylum: Chordata
- Class: Actinopterygii
- Order: Cypriniformes
- Family: Nemacheilidae
- Genus: Eonemachilus
- Species: E. altus

Binomial name
- Eonemachilus altus (Kottelat & X. L. Chu), 1988

Synonyms
- Yunnanilus altus Kottelat & X. L. Chu, 1988

Species of fish

Eonemachilus altus is a species of ray-finned fish, a stone loach, in the genus Eonemachilus from Yunnan. It occurs in small streams with a moderate current where it moves slowly in shoals along the substrate. Its diet consists of filamentous algae and insects. The type locality is in Zhanyi County.
