= Kunming Natural History Museum of Zoology =

Zoology museum

Coordinates: 25°4′13″N 102°42′12″E

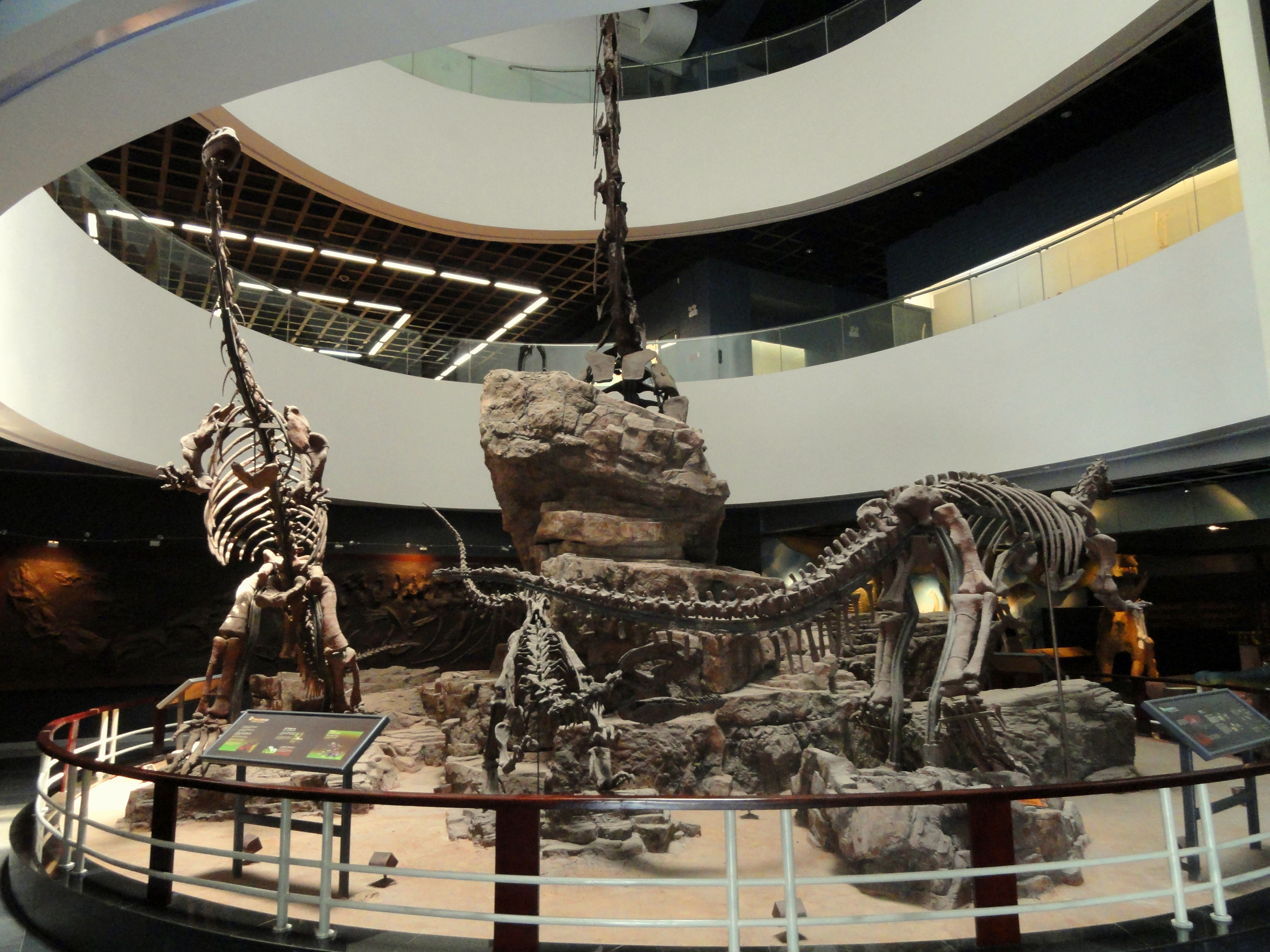
Kunming Natural History Museum of Zoology

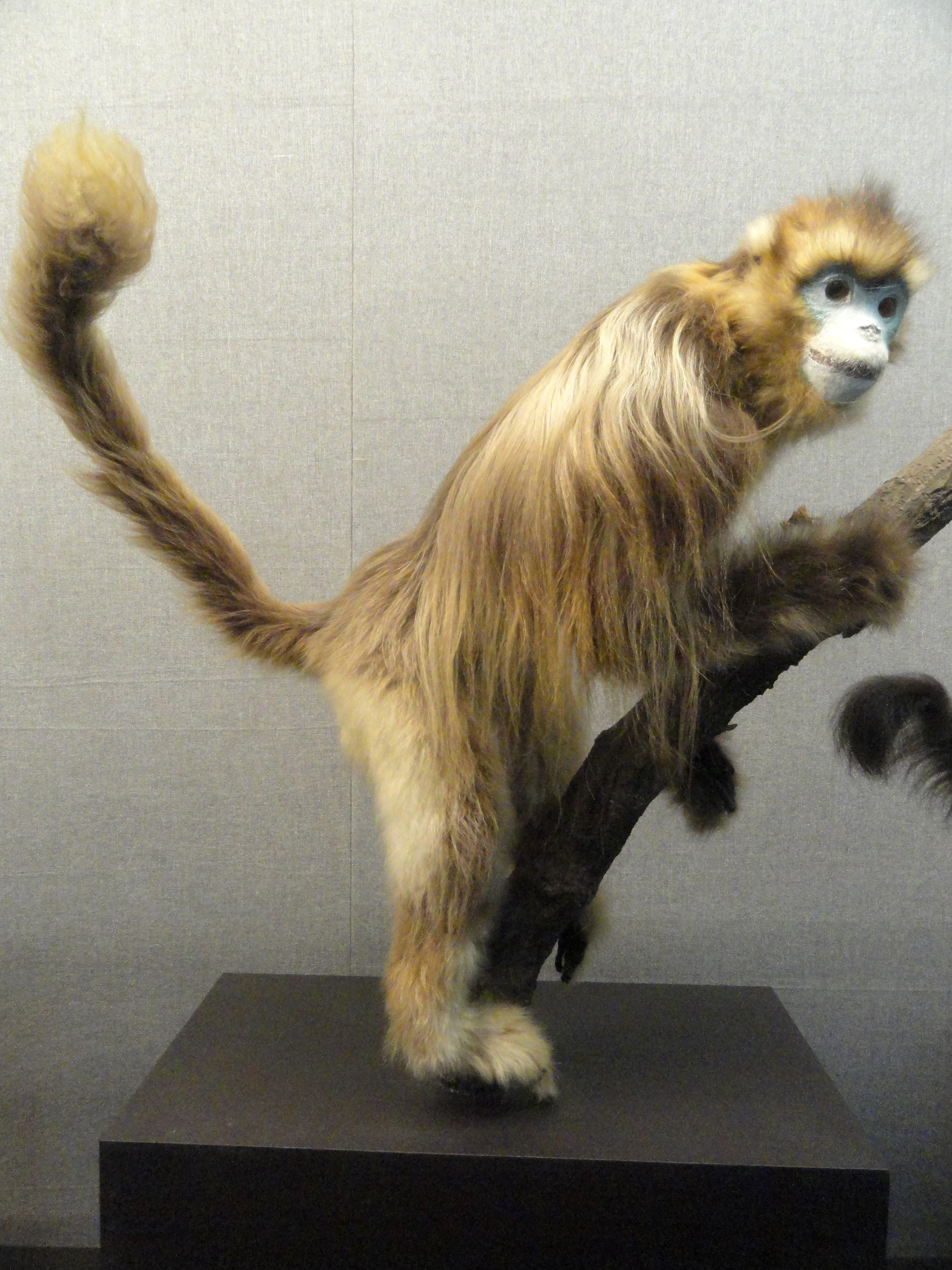
Rhinopithecus roxellana in the taxidermy section

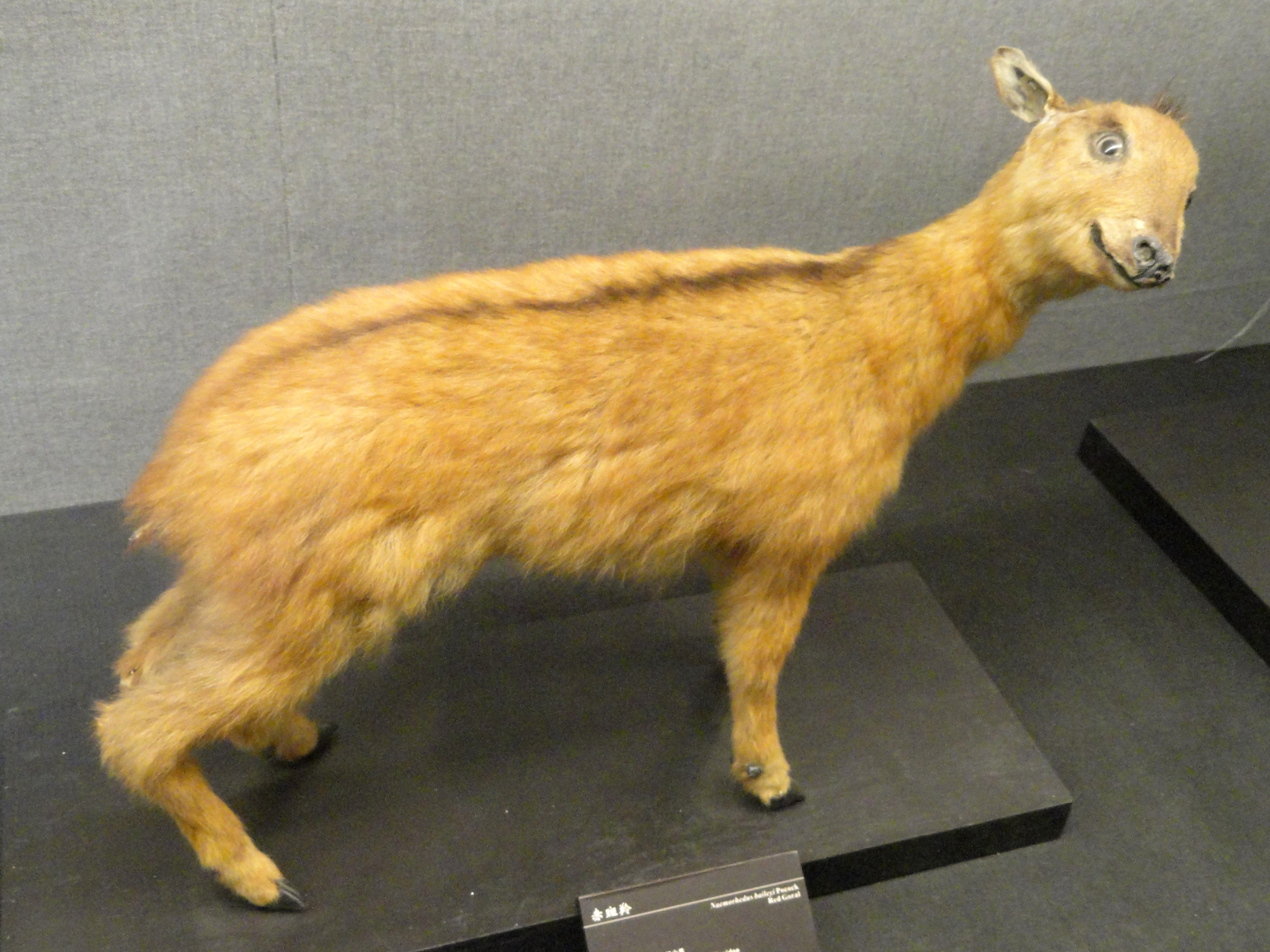
Naemorhedus baileyi in the taxidermy section

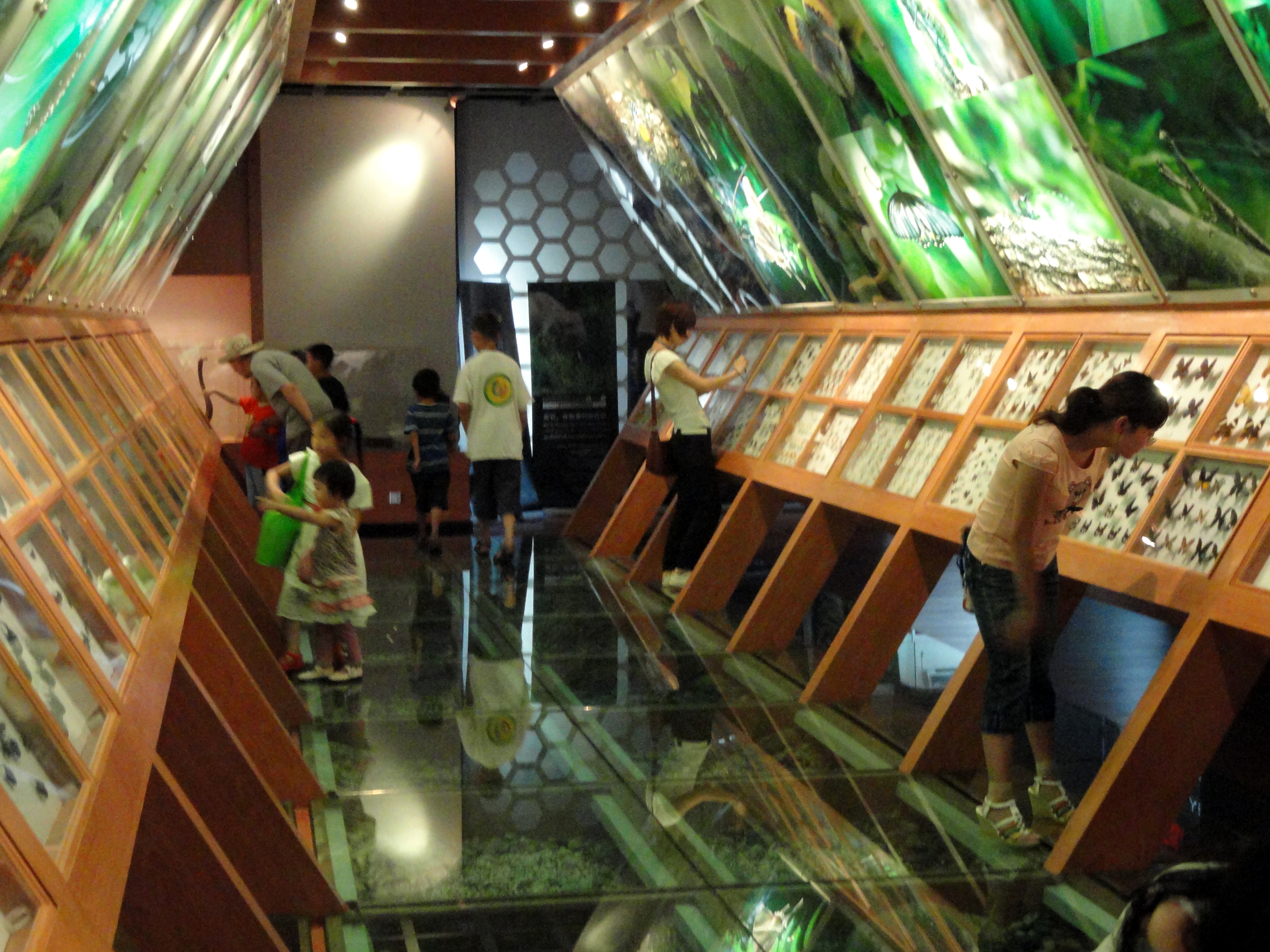
Insect displays

The Kunming Natural History Museum of Zoology (昆明动物博物馆) is located on the campus of Kunming Institute of Zoology, Jiaochang East Road, Kunming, Yunnan, China. The museum is an important project of the Chinese Academy of Sciences Knowledge Innovation Program, and a joint project of the academy and Yunnan Provincial Government.

== History ==
The Kunming Natural History Museum of Zoology presents the diversity of fauna, past and present, of southwest China. It started earth construction in 2000 and opened to the public since November 2006. Various specimens collected by several generations of scientists in Kunming Institute of Zoology are fundamental basis for the establishment of the museum.

A trio of dino-skeletons dominate the prehistoric exhibit on the first floor. These plant-eaters stomped around Yunnan about 200 million years ago. Though the biggest of the three is a cast, the smaller ones are genuine bones, exhumed from Yunnan's Lufeng Basin in the 1980s. Though the prehistoric exhibit is the most impressive, there are plenty of animals to be seen on all of the museum's three floors. An array of taxidermied mammals and birds lines the display cases of the second floor. Up another flight of stairs reveals a "Rainforest Adventure," which walks visitors along a path through synthetic trees, bird calls and a darkened cave. There are rigid fish and snakes entombed in formaldehyde jars.

Because of the museum's affiliation with the Chinese Academy of Sciences, it is well positioned as both a tourist attraction and a home to future zoological scholarship. Most of the visitors come with a scientific background.

== See also ==
- List of museums in China

== References and further reading ==
- http://www.kiz.ac.cn/en/kiz/ShowArticle.asp?ArticleID=79
- China's biggest zoological museum opens in Kunming CAS News
- Kunming Natural History Museum Opens
