= Anabarilius liui =

Conservation status
- Data Deficient (IUCN 3.1)

Scientific classification
- Kingdom: Animalia
- Phylum: Chordata
- Class: Actinopterygii
- Order: Cypriniformes
- Suborder: Cyprinoidei
- Family: Xenocyprididae
- Genus: Anabarilius
- Species: A. liui

Binomial name
- Anabarilius liui (H. W. Chang, 1944)

Species of fish

Anabarilius liui is a species of freshwater ray-finned fish belonging to the family Xenocyprididae, the East Asian minnows or sharpbellies. The nominate subspecies liui is endemic to the upper Yangtze basin in China, but there are no recent records, and it is considered extinct in the 2009 Chinese red list.
