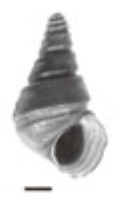
- Apertural view of the shell of Anularya mansuyi. Scale bar is 1 cm.
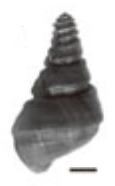
- Abapertural view of the shell of Anularya mansuyi. Scale bar is 1 cm.

Conservation status
- Endangered (IUCN 3.1)

Scientific classification
- Kingdom: Animalia
- Phylum: Mollusca
- Class: Gastropoda
- Subclass: Caenogastropoda
- Order: Architaenioglossa
- Family: Viviparidae
- Genus: Anularya
- Species: A. mansuyi

Binomial name
- Anularya mansuyi Dautzenberg & Fischer, 1905

Synonyms
- Margarya melanioides var. Mansuyi Dautzenberg & Fischer, 1905

= Anularya mansuyi =

Species of gastropod

Anularya mansuyi is a species of large operculate freshwater snail, an aquatic gastropod mollusk in the family Viviparidae, the river snails.

== Distribution ==
The distribution of Anularya mansuyi includes Xingyun Lake and Qilu Lake in Yunnan Province, China.

The former distribution of this species also included Yilong Lake, Dian Lake and Datunhai Lake (Datun Lake).

== Description ==
Shu et al. (2010) provided details about the shell and about the radula.
