= Yunnanilus sichuanensis =

Scientific classification
- Kingdom: Animalia
- Phylum: Chordata
- Class: Actinopterygii
- Order: Cypriniformes
- Family: Nemacheilidae
- Genus: Yunnanilus
- Species: Y. sichuanensis

Binomial name
- Yunnanilus sichuanensis R. H. Ding, 1995

Species of fish

Yunnanilus sichuanensis is a species of ray-finned fish, a stone loach, in the genus Yunnanilus. It is endemic to Sichuan in China where the type locality is the Shuyalong Jiang River in the drainage of the Anning River in Mianning County.

The body is long and flattened, the caudal peduncle is short and high, the head is flattened and the snout is blunt, and the eyes are large and located above the middle of the head. It has 3 pairs of whiskers, the end of the pectoral fin has a small notch, the body surface is covered with fine scales and the lateral line is incomplete. When it lives, the body color is mainly grass green, the abdomen is yellowish-white, the side of the body has black-brown longitudinal stripes and spots, and there are patches on the gill cover.
