= Anabarilius goldenlineus =

Conservation status
- Critically Endangered (IUCN 3.1)

Scientific classification
- Kingdom: Animalia
- Phylum: Chordata
- Class: Actinopterygii
- Order: Cypriniformes
- Family: Xenocyprididae
- Genus: Anabarilius
- Species: A. goldenlineus

Binomial name
- Anabarilius goldenlineus W. X. Li & A. L. Chen, 1995

Species of fish

Anabarilius goldenlineus of freshwater ray-finned fish belonging to the family Xenocyprididae, the East Asian minnows or sharpbellies. This species is endemic to Yunnan where it occurs in the Heilongtan Reservoir and Bajiang River. The International Union for Conservation of Nature classify this species as Critically endangered.
