= Margarya lecythoides =

Conservation status
- Least Concern (IUCN 3.1)

Scientific classification
- Kingdom: Animalia
- Phylum: Mollusca
- Class: Gastropoda
- Subclass: Caenogastropoda
- Order: Architaenioglossa
- Family: Viviparidae
- Genus: Margarya
- Species: M. lecythoides

Binomial name
- Margarya lecythoides (Benson, 1842)

Synonyms
- Cipangopaludina lecythoides Benson, 1842; Paludina lecythoides Benson, 1842; Cipangopaludina leucythoides (Benson, 1856); Paludina lecythoides Fischer & Dautzenberg, 1904

Species of gastropod

Margarya lecythoides is a species of a freshwater snail with an operculum and a gill, an aquatic gastropod mollusk in the family Viviparidae, the river snails.

== Distribution ==
Distribution of Margarya lecythoides includes Zhejiang Province in China Hong Kong and Vietnam.
