= Anabarilius paucirastellus =

Scientific classification
- Kingdom: Animalia
- Phylum: Chordata
- Class: Actinopterygii
- Order: Cypriniformes
- Suborder: Cyprinoidei
- Family: Xenocyprididae
- Genus: Anabarilius
- Species: A. paucirastellus

Binomial name
- Anabarilius paucirastellus P. Q. Yue & J. C. He, 1988

Species of fish

Anabarilius paucirastellus is a species of freshwater ray-finned fish belonging to the family Xenocyprididae, the East Asian minnows or sharpbellies. This species is endemic to Yunnan, in the Red River basin.
