= Yunnanilus discoloris =

Conservation status
- Critically Endangered (IUCN 3.1)

Scientific classification
- Kingdom: Animalia
- Phylum: Chordata
- Class: Actinopterygii
- Order: Cypriniformes
- Family: Nemacheilidae
- Genus: Yunnanilus
- Species: Y. discoloris

Binomial name
- Yunnanilus discoloris W. Zhou & J. C. He, 1989

Species of fish

Yunnanilus discoloris is a species of ray-finned fish, a stone loach, in the genus Yunnanilus. It is currently only in a single spring in the drainage basin of Lake Dianchi in Yunnan.

== Description ==
Yunnanilus discoloris is so named because of the sexual dimorphism this species shows. The specific name discoloris means differently coloured, it refers to the sexually dimorphic colour pattern. The males have a black longitudinal stripe on both flanks with a light blackish stripe of spots along its back while the female shows black spotting and blotching on both the back and the flanks. It is a dwarf species which has a scaleless body and the origin of the dorsal fin is in halfway along the body.

== Habitat and distribution ==
It is restricted to one tributary spring, the White Dragon Spring near Chenggong in Kunming, which flows into Lake Dianchi in Yunnan, southern China. The water in the spring, which lies at 1,886m above sea level, is clear with a bed consisting of sand with some stones and with a plant community made up of Ceratophyllum demersum, Spirogyra spp. and other species of macrophytes growing on the substrate.

== Conservation ==
Yunnanilus discoloris has a very restricted range, the single spring in which it occurs contains introduced species and the spring has been modified by man. The spring is not protected and the IUCN assess the status of this species as Critically Endangered. There may be 500 individuals in the White Dragon Spring. It formerly occurred in Lake Dianchi but its extirpation from there is thought to have been the result of the introduction of black carp, grass carp, silver carp and bighead carp into the lake, as well as pollution and the resultant loss of macrophytes.
