= Anabarilius longicaudatus =

Conservation status
- Data Deficient (IUCN 3.1)

Scientific classification
- Kingdom: Animalia
- Phylum: Chordata
- Class: Actinopterygii
- Order: Cypriniformes
- Suborder: Cyprinoidei
- Family: Xenocyprididae
- Genus: Anabarilius
- Species: A. longicaudatus

Binomial name
- Anabarilius longicaudatus Y. R. Chen, 1986

Species of fish

Anabarilius longicaudatus is a species of freshwater ray-finned fish belonging to the family Xenocyprididae, the East Asian minnows or sharpbellies. They are benthopelagic freshwater fish found only in the Pearl River in southern China. They grow to 20 cm (7.9 in) TL.
