= Yunnanilus spanisbripes =

Scientific classification
- Kingdom: Animalia
- Phylum: Chordata
- Class: Actinopterygii
- Order: Cypriniformes
- Family: Nemacheilidae
- Genus: Yunnanilus
- Species: Y. spanisbripes

Binomial name
- Yunnanilus spanisbripes L. An, B. S. Liu & W. X. Li, 2009

Species of fish

Yunnanilus spanisbripes is a species of ray-finned fish, a stone loach, in the genus Yunnanilus. The type locality of this species is the Niulanjiang River in Zhanyi County in Yunnan.
