= Anabarilius alburnops =

Conservation status
- Endangered (IUCN 3.1)

Scientific classification
- Kingdom: Animalia
- Phylum: Chordata
- Class: Actinopterygii
- Order: Cypriniformes
- Family: Xenocyprididae
- Genus: Anabarilius
- Species: A. alburnops

Binomial name
- Anabarilius alburnops (Regan, 1914)

Synonyms
- Barilius alburnops Regan, 1914; Hemiculterella alburnops (Regan, 1914); Ischikauia alburnops (Regan, 1914); Hemiculter andrewsi Nichols, 1918

Species of fish

Anabarilius alburnops (also known as silver minnow or silvery white fish, a direct translation of its Chinese name, 银白鱼) is a species of ray-finned fish in the genus Anabarilius. It is only known from Dian Lake and Songhuaba Reservoir, both in Kunming, Yunnan. It can reach sizes above 31 cm (12 in) SL.

The species was once common in Dian Lake, but has dramatically declined since the 1950s; today, only a few individuals are occasionally captured. Its decline is caused by introduced fish species, pollution, the loss of macrophytes (in part due to grass carp), over-fishing, and the loss of breeding sites. Along with many other fish species endemic to Dian Lake, it is a threatened species.
