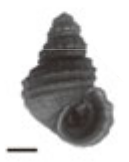
- Shell of Margarya monodi

Conservation status
- Critically Endangered (IUCN 3.1)

Scientific classification
- Kingdom: Animalia
- Phylum: Mollusca
- Class: Gastropoda
- Subclass: Caenogastropoda
- Order: Architaenioglossa
- Family: Viviparidae
- Genus: Margarya
- Species: M. monodi

Binomial name
- Margarya monodi Dautzenberg & Fischer, 1905

Synonyms
- Margarya (Margarya) monodi Dautzenberg & H. Fischer, 1905 · accepted, alternate representation; Margarya elongata Tchang & Tsi, 1949; Margarya yini (Tchang & Tsi, 1949); Margarya melanioides var. monodi Dautzenberg & Fischer, 1905; Margarya tchangsii Xia, 1982

= Margarya monodi =

Species of gastropod

Margarya monodi is a species of large operculate freshwater snail, an aquatic gastropod mollusc in the family Viviparidae, the river snails.

This species appears to be endemic to Lake Dianchi, in Yunnan Province, China.

These snails are collected commercially and used as medicine and food.

== Threats ==
This snail is no longer abundant as it was before the 1980s, when fishermen took as much as 20 kg a day per person. Currently during the open fishing season the fishermen can find only 2 kg a day. In 1999 there were still snails in the eastern part of the lake but by 2009 the snail was found only in the 50 km² of the lake that is near the outflow.

Threats to this snail species' survival include organic and inorganic pollution, overharvesting and some introduced species of predatory fish.
