= Anabarilius transmontanus =

Conservation status
- Data Deficient (IUCN 3.1)

Scientific classification
- Kingdom: Animalia
- Phylum: Chordata
- Class: Actinopterygii
- Order: Cypriniformes
- Family: Xenocyprididae
- Genus: Anabarilius
- Species: A. transmontanus

Binomial name
- Anabarilius transmontanus (Nichols, 1925)

Synonyms
- Ischikauia transmontana Nichols, 1925; Anabarilius transmontana (Nichols, 1925); Rohanus transmontana (Nichols, 1925)

Species of fish

Anabarilius transmontanus is a species of freshwater ray-finned fish belonging to the family Xenocyprididae, the East Asian minnows or sharpbellies. It is known from the Red River and Pearl River drainages in Yunnan, China; it is expected to occur in northern Vietnam. It can grow to 16 cm (6.3 in) total length, although it is commonly around 10 cm (3.9 in) standard length. It occurs in both rivers and lakes. The species is threatened by domestic and urban water pollution, habitat loss, and possibly non-native species.
