= Margarya oxytropoides =

Scientific classification
- Domain: Eukaryota
- Kingdom: Animalia
- Phylum: Mollusca
- Class: Gastropoda
- Subclass: Caenogastropoda
- Order: Architaenioglossa
- Family: Viviparidae
- Genus: Margarya
- Species: M. oxytropoides

Binomial name
- Margarya oxytropoides (Heude, 1889)

Synonyms
- Cipangopaludina dianchiensis Zhang, 1990 Margarya melanioides dianchiensis Huang, 2007

Species of gastropod

Margarya oxytropoides is a species of large operculate freshwater snail, an aquatic gastropod mollusc in the family Viviparidae, the river snails.

== Distribution ==
The distribution of Margarya francheti includes Dian Lake, Lugu Lake, and small lakes around Zhaotong in Yunnan Province, China.

== Description ==
Zhang et al. (2015) provided details about the shell and about the radula.
