= Anabarilius brevianalis =

Conservation status
- Critically Endangered (IUCN 3.1)

Scientific classification
- Kingdom: Animalia
- Phylum: Chordata
- Class: Actinopterygii
- Order: Cypriniformes
- Family: Xenocyprididae
- Genus: Anabarilius
- Species: A. brevianalis

Binomial name
- Anabarilius brevianalis W. Zhou & G. H. Cui, 1992

Species of fish

Anabarilius brevianalis is a species of freshwater ray-finned fish belonging to the family Xenocyprididae, the East Asian minnows or sharpbellies. This fish occurs in the Jinsha River basin in China.
