= Eonemachilus nigromaculatus =

Conservation status
- Endangered (IUCN 3.1)

Scientific classification
- Kingdom: Animalia
- Phylum: Chordata
- Class: Actinopterygii
- Order: Cypriniformes
- Family: Nemacheilidae
- Genus: Eonemachilus
- Species: E. nigromaculatus

Binomial name
- Eonemachilus nigromaculatus Regan, 1904

Synonyms
- Yunnanilus nigromaculatus (Regan, 1904)

Species of fish

Eonemachilus nigromaculatus, also known as Yunnanilus nigromaculatus, is a species of stone loach endemic to the Dianchi Lake basin (which includes the small Yangling Lake) in China, but has apparently been extirpated from Dianchi Lake itself due to heavy pollution. It was formerly placed in the genus Eonemachilus.
