= Anabarilius qionghaiensis =

Conservation status
- Extinct (yes) (IUCN 3.1)

Scientific classification
- Kingdom: Animalia
- Phylum: Chordata
- Class: Actinopterygii
- Order: Cypriniformes
- Suborder: Cyprinoidei
- Family: Xenocyprididae
- Genus: Anabarilius
- Species: †A. qionghaiensis

Binomial name
- †Anabarilius qionghaiensis Y. R. Chen, 1986

Species of fish

Anabarilius qionghaiensis is a species of freshwater ray-finned fish belonging to the family Xenocyprididae, the East Asian minnows or sharpbellies. This fish was known only from a single lake, Qionghai Hu, Xichang, Sichuan in China but it is now considered to be extinct in this lake.
