= Yunnanilus longibulla =

Scientific classification
- Kingdom: Animalia
- Phylum: Chordata
- Class: Actinopterygii
- Order: Cypriniformes
- Family: Nemacheilidae
- Genus: Yunnanilus
- Species: Y. longibulla

Binomial name
- Yunnanilus longibulla J. X. Yang, 1990

Species of fish

Yunnanilus longibulla is a species of ray-finned fish, a stone loach, in the genus Yunnanilus. The type locality for this species is Chenghai Lake in Yunnan. The specific name longibulla means "long bubble" and refers to the elongated shape of the swim bladder compared to closely related species.
