= Eonemachilus bajiangensis =

Scientific classification
- Kingdom: Animalia
- Phylum: Chordata
- Class: Actinopterygii
- Order: Cypriniformes
- Family: Nemacheilidae
- Genus: Eonemachilus
- Species: E. bajiangensis

Binomial name
- Eonemachilus bajiangensis W. X. Li, 2004

Synonyms
- Yunnanilus bajiangensis W. X. Li, 2004

Species of fish

Eonemachilus bajiangensiss is a species of ray-finned fish, a stoneloach, in the genus Eonemachilus. Its type locality is the Bajiang River in Shilin County in Yunnan.
