= Yunnanilus beipanjiangensis =

Scientific classification
- Kingdom: Animalia
- Phylum: Chordata
- Class: Actinopterygii
- Order: Cypriniformes
- Family: Nemacheilidae
- Genus: Yunnanilus
- Species: Y. beipanjiangensis

Binomial name
- Yunnanilus beipanjiangensis W. X. Li, W. N. Mao & R. F. Sun, 1994

Species of fish

Yunnanilus beipanjiangensis is a species of ray-finned fish, a stone loach, in the genus Yunnanilus. Its type locality is the Beipanjiang River system, Yunnan Province, China.
