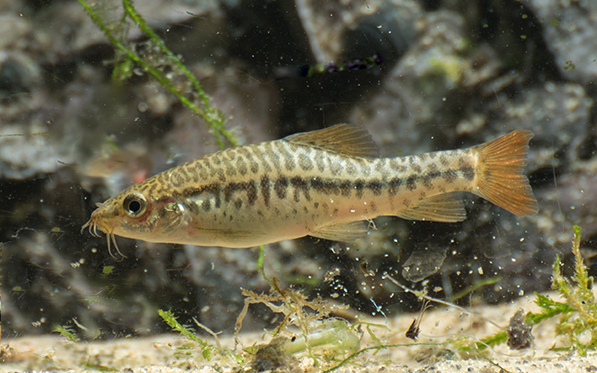
- Lake Inle loach (Petruichthys brevis)

Scientific classification
- Kingdom: Animalia
- Phylum: Chordata
- Class: Actinopterygii
- Order: Cypriniformes
- Family: Nemacheilidae
- Genus: Petruichthys; Menon, 1987

Type species
- Nemachilus brevis Boulenger, 1893

= Petruichthys =

Genus of fishes

Petruichthys is a genus of stone loaches native to eastern Asia. The genus is not universally accepted as valid and the two species placed there have been placed in other genera.

== Species ==
There are currently two recognised species in this genus:

- Petruichthys brevis (Boulenger, 1893)
- Petruichthys salmonides (B. L. Chaudhuri, 1911)

P. salmonides has been regarded as a species inquirenda but Eschmeyer's Catalog of Fishes treats it as a valid recognised species within Petruichthys.
