= Anabarilius xundianensis =

Conservation status
- Data Deficient (IUCN 3.1)

Scientific classification
- Kingdom: Animalia
- Phylum: Chordata
- Class: Actinopterygii
- Order: Cypriniformes
- Suborder: Cyprinoidei
- Family: Xenocyprididae
- Genus: Anabarilius
- Species: A. xundianensis

Binomial name
- Anabarilius xundianensis J. C. He, 1984

Species of fish

Anabarilius xundianensis is a species of freshwater ray-finned fish belonging to the family Xenocyprididae, the East Asian minnows or sharpbellies. It is endemic to Yunnan (China). It is known from Qingshui Lake in the eponymous Xundian County, on the Jinsha River (a tributary of Yangtze). The exact threats are unknown but it may be fished for food and sensitive to pollution.
