= Eonemachilus caohaiensis =

Scientific classification
- Kingdom: Animalia
- Phylum: Chordata
- Class: Actinopterygii
- Order: Cypriniformes
- Family: Nemacheilidae
- Genus: Eonemachilus
- Species: E. caohaiensis

Binomial name
- Eonemachilus caohaiensis R. H. Ding, 1992

Species of fish

Eonemachilus caohaiensis is a species of ray-finned fish, a stone loach, in the genus Eonemachilus. Its type locality is Caohai Lake, Weining County in Guizhou, China.
