= Yunnanilus elakatis =

Scientific classification
- Kingdom: Animalia
- Phylum: Chordata
- Class: Actinopterygii
- Order: Cypriniformes
- Family: Nemacheilidae
- Genus: Yunnanilus
- Species: Y. elakatis

Binomial name
- Yunnanilus elakatis W. X. Cao & S. Q. Zhu, 1989

Species of fish

Yunnanilus elakatis is a species of ray-finned fish, a stone loach, in the genus Yunnanilus. Its type locality is in Yiliang County, Kunming in Yunnan. The specific name refers the spindle-like body shape.
