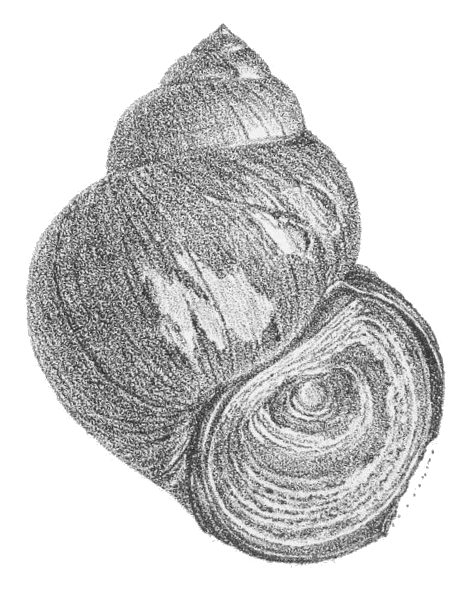
- Shell and operculum from type description.

Conservation status
- Least Concern (IUCN 3.1)

Scientific classification
- Kingdom: Animalia
- Phylum: Mollusca
- Class: Gastropoda
- Subclass: Caenogastropoda
- Order: Architaenioglossa
- Family: Viviparidae
- Genus: Margarya
- Species: M. catayensis

Binomial name
- Margarya catayensis (Heude, 1890)

Synonyms
- Paludina catayensis Heude, 1890 (orthographic error); Paludina cathayensis Heude, 1890

= Margarya catayensis =

Species of gastropod

Margarya catayensis is a species of large, freshwater snail with an operculum and a gill, an aquatic gastropod mollusk in the family Viviparidae, the river snails.

== Taxonomy ==
This species was described under the name Paludina catayensis by French Jesuit Pierre Marie Heude in 1890. Later reviewers treated the specific name catayensis as an orthographic error and changed the specific name to cathayensis. There is high intraspecific variation of shells within the genus Cipangopaludina, so Wilhelm Kobelt (1909) considered this taxon as a subspecies of Vivipara chinensis. Later authors Yen (1943), Liu (1991) and Lu et al (2014) considered this taxon as a separate species.

== Distribution ==
The species has a wide distribution throughout central and southeastern China, occurring in East China (provinces Shandong, Anhui, Jiangsu, Zhejiang, Jiangxi), North China (Shanxi, Hebei) and Central China (Henan, Hubei, Hunan).

== Description ==
The width of the shell is 24.3–50.5 mm. The height of the shell is 27.7–58.5 mm. The shell has from five to six whorls. The apex is pointed.

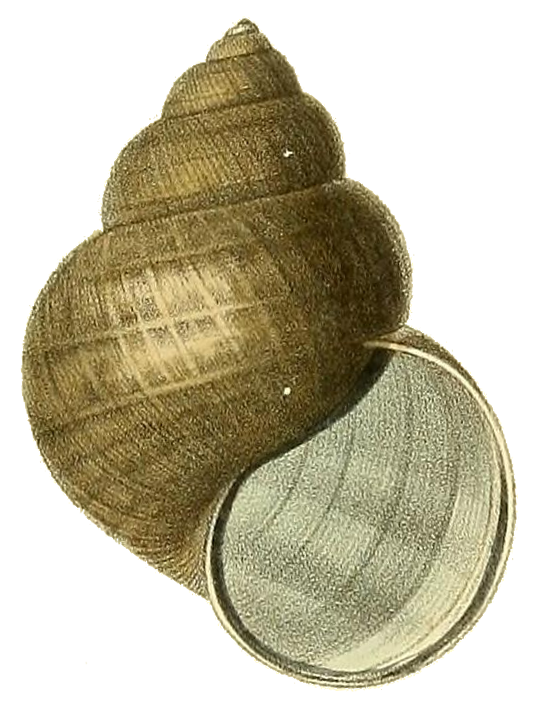
Drawing of an apertural view.

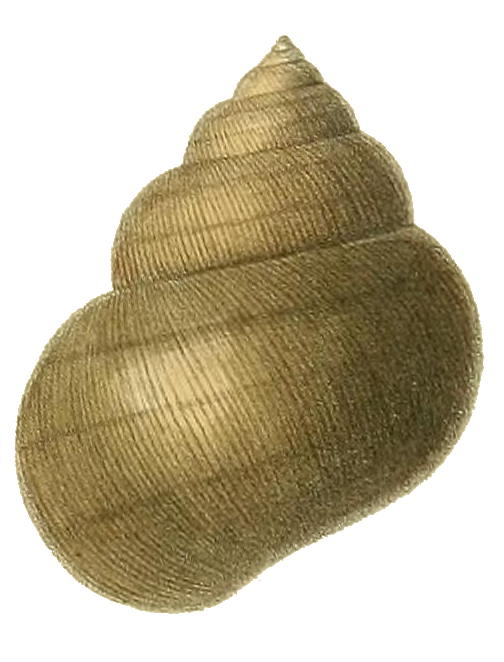
Drawing of an abapertural view.

The kidney is triple-shaped. The diploid chromosome number of C. cathayensis is 2n=18. The complete mitochondrial genome of Cipangopaludina cathayensis is known since 2014. Its length is 17,157 bp.

== Ecology ==
It inhabits lakes, reservoirs and ponds, as well as grassy paddies, where it clings to aquatic plants.

Each gravid female carries more than 60 embryos inside her. The shell of embryo has three whorls.

The pollutant removal in constructed wetlands with these snails was better, than in constructed wetlands without them.

Parasites of Cipangopaludina cathayensis include trematode Aspidogaster conchicola.

== Human use ==
Cipangopaludina cathayensis
Nutritional value per 100 g (3.5 oz)
- Carbohydrates: 3.83 g
- Protein
Amino acids
| Threonine | 2.952 g |
| Isoleucine | 2.026 g |
| Leucine | 5.198 g |
| Lysine | 3.700 g |
| Methionine | 1.145 g |
| Cystine | 1.233 g |
| Phenylalanine | 1.894 g |
| Tyrosine | 2.731 g |
| Valine | 1.894 g |
| Arginine | 4.537 g |
| Histidine | 1.057 g |
| Alanine | 3.524 g |
| Aspartic acid | 6.211 g |
| Glutamic acid | 9.868 g |
| Glycine | 3.340 g |
| Proline | 1.850 g |
| Serine | 2.996 g |
- Other constituents: Quantity
- Water: 77.30 g
- Crude fat: 0.60 g
- Crude protein: 13.72 g
- Crude ash: 4.55 g
- ^{†}Percentages estimated using US recommendations for adults.

It is used as human food and in the preparation of medicines, and as feed for fish, poultry and livestock. It is also used as a fertilizer.
