= Anabarilius polylepis =

Conservation status
- Endangered (IUCN 3.1)

Scientific classification
- Kingdom: Animalia
- Phylum: Chordata
- Class: Actinopterygii
- Order: Cypriniformes
- Suborder: Cyprinoidei
- Family: Xenocyprididae
- Genus: Anabarilius
- Species: A. polylepis

Binomial name
- Anabarilius polylepis (Regan, 1904)

Synonyms
- Barilius polylepis Regan, 1904

Species of fish

Anabarilius polylepis is a species of freshwater ray-finned fish belonging to the family Xenocyprididae, the East Asian minnows or sharpbellies.

This species is endemic to Yunnan, China. It only occurs in Dian Lake and Songhuaba reservoir in Kunming. It was once a major commercial fish species, but it has not been confirmed in the lake since the 1970s. Its decline is attributed to many factors: introduced fish species, decreasing water quality, the loss of macrophytes (partly caused by the introduced grass carp), over-fishing, and the loss of breeding sites due to siltation and blocked access.

Anabarilius polylepis grows to 22.7 cm (8.9 in) standard length. It lives in the uppermost ten metres of the water column and feeds mainly on aquatic insects, plankton, and plant fragments.
