= Yunnanilus paludosus =

Scientific classification
- Kingdom: Animalia
- Phylum: Chordata
- Class: Actinopterygii
- Order: Cypriniformes
- Family: Nemacheilidae
- Genus: Yunnanilus
- Species: Y. paludosus

Binomial name
- Yunnanilus paludosus Kottelat & X. L. Chu, 1988

Synonyms
- Yunnanilus macrolepis W. X. Li, J. N. Tao & W. N. Mao, 2000

Species of fish

Yunnanilus paludosus is a species of stone loach endemic to China. This species is endemic to the endorheic drainage system which feeds the Datangzi Marsh in Luoping County, Yunnan, The specific name paludosus means "marshy", referring to the habitat of the type locality, Datangzi Marsh.
