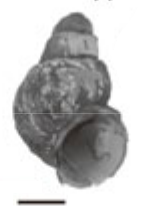
- Shell of Margarya francheti.

Scientific classification
- Kingdom: Animalia
- Phylum: Mollusca
- Class: Gastropoda
- Subclass: Caenogastropoda
- Order: Architaenioglossa
- Family: Viviparidae
- Genus: Margarya
- Species: M. francheti

Binomial name
- Margarya francheti (Mabille, 1886)

Synonyms
- Margarya tropidophora (Mabille, 1886); Margarya (Mabillemargarya) francheti (Mabille, 1886)· accepted, alternate representation; Margarya (Mabillemargarya) tropidophora (Mabille, 1886)– He, 2013; Vivipara francheti Mabille, 1886 (original combination); Vivipara (Tulotoma) margeriana var. rotundata (Neumayr, 1887); Vivipara tropidophora Mabille, 1886

= Margarya francheti =

Species of gastropod

Margarya francheti is a species of large operculate freshwater snail, an aquatic gastropod mollusc in the family Viviparidae, the river snails.

== Taxonomy ==
He J.(2013) introduced a new subgenus, Mabillemargarya, for M. francheti; however, this taxonomic act is not supported by comparative morphology and molecular phylogenetics. Therefore, Mabillemargarya is considered as a junior synonym of Margarya.

== Distribution ==
The distribution of Margarya francheti includes Dian Lake, Erhai Lake, Jianhu Lake in Yunnan Province, China.

== Description ==
Zhang et al. (2015) provided details about the shell and about the radula.
