= Tchangmargarya multilabiata =

Scientific classification
- Domain: Eukaryota
- Kingdom: Animalia
- Phylum: Mollusca
- Class: Gastropoda
- Subclass: Caenogastropoda
- Order: Architaenioglossa
- Family: Viviparidae
- Genus: Tchangmargarya
- Species: T. multilabiata

Binomial name
- Tchangmargarya multilabiata Zhang & Chen, 2015

Species of gastropod

Tchangmargarya multilabiata is a species of large operculate freshwater snail, an aquatic gastropod mollusc in the family Viviparidae, the river snails.

== Distribution ==
This species appear to be endemic to lakes in Stone Forest, e.g. Lake Changhu, Lake Yuehu and Lake Guangtangzi in Yunnan Province in the China.

== Description ==
Zhang et al. (2015) provided details about the shell and about the radula.
