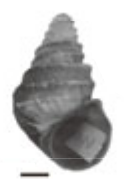
- Apertural view of the shell of Margarya bicostata. Scale bar is 1 cm.
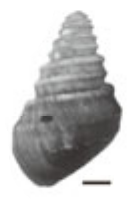
- Abapertural view of the shell of Margarya bicostata. Scale bar is 1 cm.

Conservation status
- Endangered (IUCN 3.1)

Scientific classification
- Kingdom: Animalia
- Phylum: Mollusca
- Class: Gastropoda
- Subclass: Caenogastropoda
- Order: Architaenioglossa
- Family: Viviparidae
- Genus: Margarya
- Species: M. bicostata

Binomial name
- Margarya bicostata Tchang & Tsi, 1949

= Margarya bicostata =

Species of gastropod

Margarya bicostata is a species of large operculate freshwater snail, an aquatic gastropod mollusc in the family Viviparidae, the river snails.

== Distribution ==
The distribution of Margarya bicostata includes Fuxian Lake in Yunnan Province, China. Former distribution also included Dian Lake.
