= Cipangopaludina miyagii =

Conservation status
- Endangered (IUCN 3.1)

Scientific classification
- Kingdom: Animalia
- Phylum: Mollusca
- Class: Gastropoda
- Subclass: Caenogastropoda
- Order: Architaenioglossa
- Family: Viviparidae
- Genus: Cipangopaludina
- Species: C. miyagii

Binomial name
- Cipangopaludina miyagii Kuroda, 1941

Species of freshwater snail

Cipangopaludina miyagii is a species of large, freshwater snail with an operculum and a gill, an aquatic gastropod mollusk in the family Viviparidae, the river snails. This freshwater snail found only in Southern part of Taiwan.

== Taxonomy ==
This species was described by Tokubei Kuroda, the famous Japanese malacologist expertised in malacology fauna of Taiwan during its occupation by Japan, in 1941. The freshwater snail is classified as a species of the genus Cipangopaludina, and was named after Mr. Miyagi, the one who caught the snail. The sample was caught in Takao Prefecture, which corresponds to the area of modern-day Kaohsiung City and Pingtung County. The current distribution of the species reflects that it exists in water near grassland of both area.
