= Yunnanilus macrositanus =

Scientific classification
- Kingdom: Animalia
- Phylum: Chordata
- Class: Actinopterygii
- Order: Cypriniformes
- Family: Nemacheilidae
- Genus: Yunnanilus
- Species: Y. macrositanus

Binomial name
- Yunnanilus macrositanus W. X. Li, 1999

Synonyms
- Yunnanilus forkicaudalis W. X. Li, 1999; Yunnanilus macroistainus W. X. Li, 1999 (incorrect spelling)

Species of fish

Yunnanilus macrositanus is a species of stone loach endemic to China. The specific name is spelled macroistainus in Fishbase but as first reviser Maurice Kottelat chose to use macrositanus and this has been followed by the Catalog of Fishes. The type locality of this species is in Lunan County, Heilongtan, Yunnan.
