= Kunming Institute of Zoology =

Chinese research institute

Kunming Institute of Zoology (KIZ) (中国科学院昆明动物研究所), one of the 20 biological institutes under the Chinese Academy of Sciences (CAS), is one of China's first class zoological research institutes, located in Kunming, Yunnan province. The Institute has access to the unique and diversified animal resources of the Eastern Himalayas as well as a wide variety of the species from across Southeast Asia, the southern parts of Yunnan province being part of the Indo-Burma biodiversity hotspot. KIZ focuses on life science research, with research groups including systematic zoology, conservation biology, cytology, molecular biology, genome evolution, reproductive and developmental biology, neurobiology, immunological biology on important virus disease, zoological toxicology and primate biology.

== History ==
The KIZ was established in April 1959, originally as the Insect Institute, Lac Division. In 1963, it became the Southwest Institute of Zoology, CAS and in 1970 it was placed under the jurisdiction of Yunnan Province and renamed the Yunnan Institute of Zoology. In 1978 it was returned to the Chinese Academy of Sciences that it was named the Kunming Institute of Zoology, CAS.

== See also ==
- Kunming Natural History Museum of Zoology
