= Yunnanilus pleurotaenia =

Conservation status
- Vulnerable (IUCN 3.1)

Scientific classification
- Kingdom: Animalia
- Phylum: Chordata
- Class: Actinopterygii
- Order: Cypriniformes
- Family: Nemacheilidae
- Genus: Yunnanilus
- Species: Y. pleurotaenia

Binomial name
- Yunnanilus pleurotaenia (Regan, 1904)

Synonyms
- Nemachilus pleurotaenia Regan, 1904; Yunnanilus tigerivinus W. X. Li & S. Duan, 1999

Species of fish

Yunnanilus pleurotaenia is a species of stone loach, family Nemacheilidae. It is endemic to Yunnan in southern China. It is known with certainty from Dian Lake and the associated streams; similar fish reported from other lakes might or might not refer to this species. It grows to 6.5 cm (2.6 in) SL.
