= Cibi Lake =

Lake in Eryuan County, Yunnan Province, China

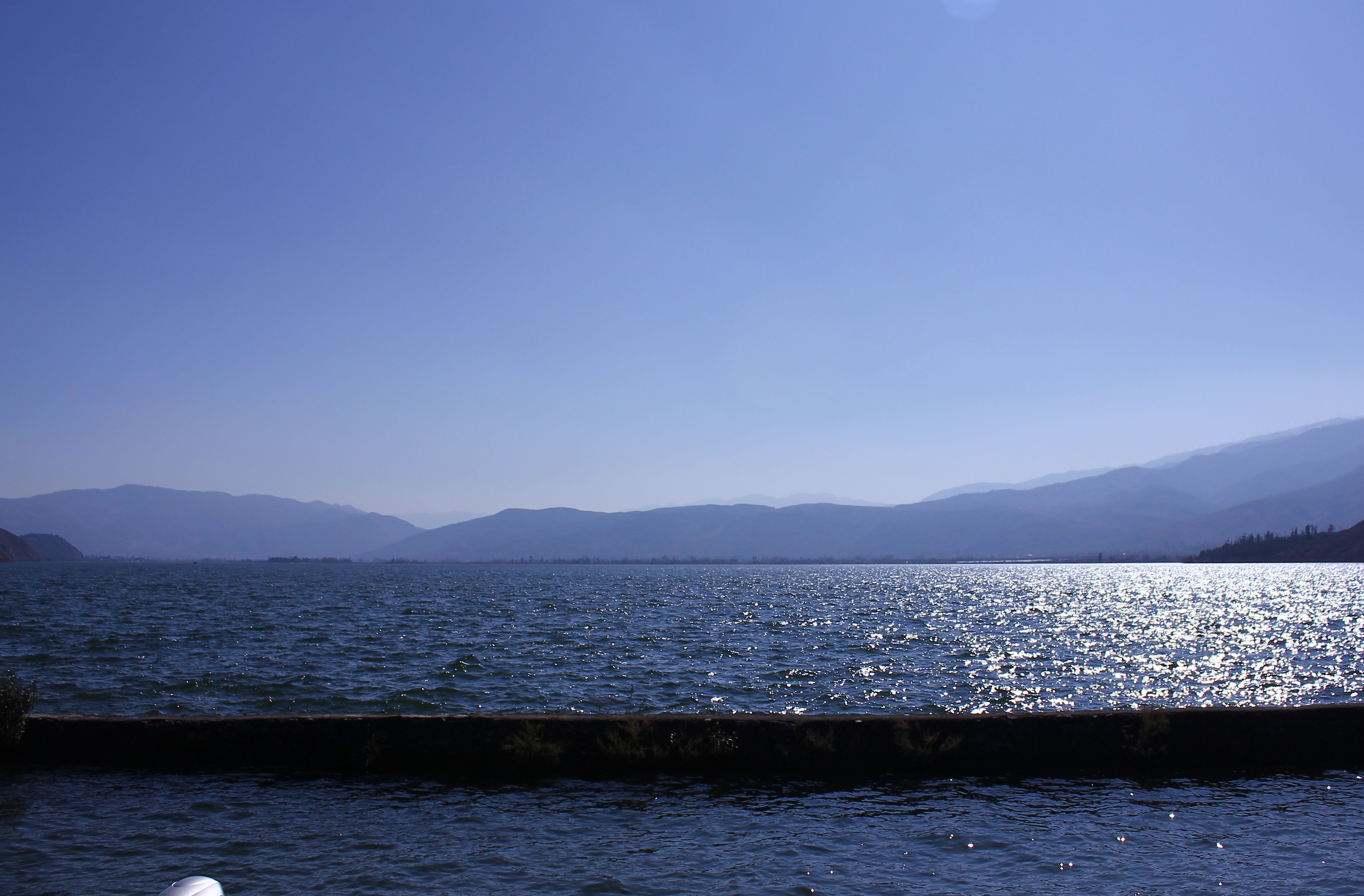
- Cibi Lake viewed form north shore

- Location within Yunnan Location within China
- Location: Eryuan County, Yunnan Province, China
- Coordinates: 26°09′N 99°57′E
- Primary inflows: Fengyu River
- Primary outflows: Haiwei River
- Basin countries: China
- Max. length: 6.1 km (4 mi)
- Max. width: 2.5 km (2 mi)
- Surface area: 8.46 km^{2} (0 sq mi)
- Average depth: 11 m (36 ft)
- Max. depth: 32 m (105 ft)
- Water volume: 932 million cubic metres (32.9×10^{9} cu ft)
- Shore length^{1}: 17 km (11 mi)
- Surface elevation: 2,056.2 m (6,746 ft)
- Settlements: Cibihu Town
- ^{1} Shore length is not a well-defined measure.

Cibi Lake (Chinese: 茈碧湖; pinyin: Cíbì Hú) is a lake in Eryuan County, northwestern Yunnan Province, China. It lies about 73 km north of Dali City. It is fed by the Fengyu River and drains southward into the Erhai Lake via the Miju River (the upstream of it called Haiwei River).The lake is 6.1 km long and 0.75–2.5 km wide, with a 17 km shoreline.
