= Yangzong Lake =

Lake in Yunnan, China

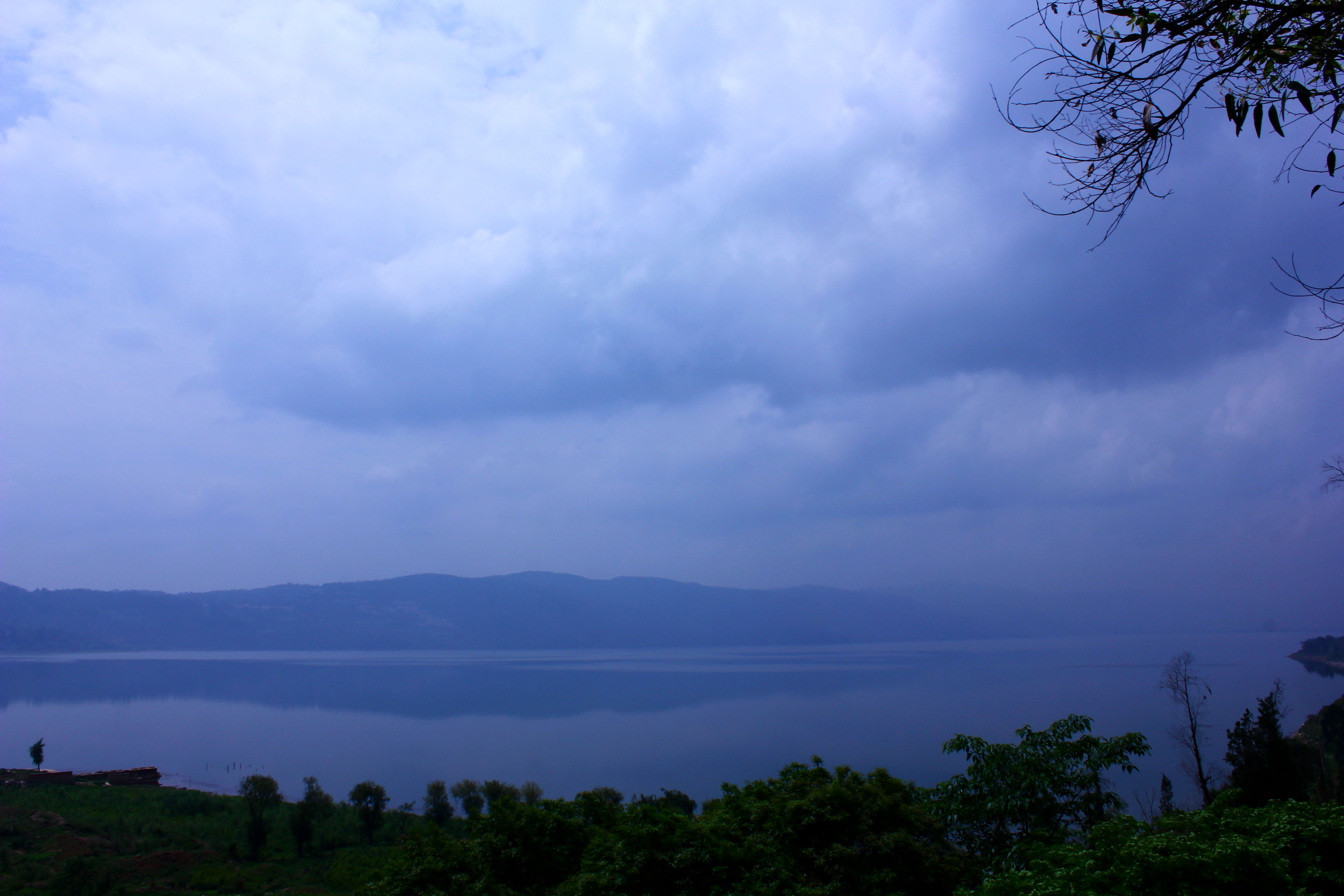

- Location within Yunnan
- Location: Yunnan
- Coordinates: 24°54′34″N 103°0′16″E
- Primary inflows: Yangzong River
- Primary outflows: Baiyi River
- Catchment area: 192 km^{2} (74 sq mi)
- Basin countries: China
- Max. length: 12.5 km (7.8 mi)
- Max. width: 3.3 km (2.1 mi)
- Surface area: 31 km^{2} (12 sq mi)
- Average depth: 19 m (62 ft)
- Max. depth: 29.3 m (96 ft)
- Water volume: 617 million cubic metres (500,000 acre⋅ft)
- Shore length^{1}: 33.6 km (20.9 mi)
- Surface elevation: 1,770.2 m (5,808 ft)
- Settlements: Tangchi Subdistrict
- ^{1} Shore length is not a well-defined measure.

Yangzonghai Lake (simplified Chinese: 阳宗海; traditional Chinese: 陽宗海; pinyin: Yángzōng Hǎi) (given on some maps as Yangzong Sea, though it is fresh water) is located between Yiliang County, Chenggong District and Chengjiang County, 45 kilometers east of Kunming City in Yunnan Province, China. About 30,000 people rely on the Lake as their drinking water. Yangzonghai Lake is noted for its underwater springs and is one of several scenic areas in Yunnan province, which is known for its biodiversity. The lake is a popular resort destination for people living in the nearby provincial capital of Kunming, which itself borders Dianchi Lake, one of China's biggest freshwater lakes but also one of its most polluted.

== Pollution ==
As recently as 2002, Yangzonghai had been noted for having water clean enough for drinking and swimming. But as of September 2008, it was officially considered unfit for drinking, swimming in or fishing in, when the provincial government announced high levels of arsenic in its waters. The arsenic contamination was discovered (in June 2008) when an inspection was made of enterprises operating in the Yangzonghai basin. Eight companies were found to have been engaged in illegal polluting practices. Yunnan Chengjiang Jinye Industrial and Trade Co Ltd (云南澄江锦业工贸有限公司) was named as the main polluter. The company allegedly failed to build the legally required treatment facility for its wastewater, with years of accumulated arsenic seeping into the local water table. It had been fined multiple times in the past, but the relatively small fines were viewed by the company as an extra cost of doing business.

Yunnan Communist Party Secretary Bai Enpei (白恩培) and Yunnan Governor Qin Guangrong (秦光荣) have pledged to take "decisive action" to remedy the situation. In February 2008, Kunming Communist Party Secretary Qiu He (仇和) visited Yangzonghai, warning local enterprises that the lake must not become a "second Dianchi".

An article posted on xinhuanet.com, October 22, 2008 said: "Three executives of a company were arrested and 12 government officials fired in connection with polluting a lake in southwest China's Yunnan Province, according to a provincial inspection department spokesman on Wednesday. The executives were Li Dahong, chairman of the board of directors with Jinye Industry and Trade Co., Ltd., and Jin Dadong, director in charge of production in the company. The spokesman did not disclose the identity of the third executive. The 12 fired officials included Chen Zhifen, a vice mayor of Yuxi City, Yang Zhenqiang, assistant to the mayor, Fang Jianhua, director of the city environmental protection bureau, and two unnamed officials with the provincial water resources department. The others were removed from county-level government departments."

== Cleanup project ==
The Yunnan provincial government has initiated the "China Yunnan Yangzonghai Lake Water Pollution Reduction, Arsenic Removal and Water Quality Restoration" project in a bid to clean up the lake via the Yunnan Provincial Scientific and Technological Development Research Institute. The main objective of the project will be to reduce the amount of arsenic in Yangzonghai's waters from the current 0.128 grams/liter to 0.050 grams/liter within a three-year period.
