= Yunnanilus =

Scientific classification
- Kingdom: Animalia
- Phylum: Chordata
- Class: Actinopterygii
- Division: Teleostei
- Order: Cypriniformes
- Family: Nemacheilidae
- Genus: Yunnanilus; Nichols, 1925

Type species
- Nemacheilus pleurotaenia Regan, 1904

Genus of fishes

Yunnanilus is a genus of small stone loaches that are endemic to southeastern China, especially Guangxi and Yunnan. They are found in rivers, streams and lakes; some species are restricted to caves.

== Species ==
These are the currently recognized species in this genus;

- Yunnanilus analis J. X. Yang, 1990
- Yunnanilus beipanjiangensis W. X. Li, W. N. Mao & R. F. Sun, 1994
- Yunnanilus chuanheensis Jiang, Zhao, L.-N. Du & Wang, 2021
- Yunnanilus chui J. X. Yang, 1991
- Yunnanilus discoloris W. Zhou & J. C. He, 1989
- Yunnanilus elakatis W. X. Cao & S. Q. Zhu, 1989
- Yunnanilus forkicaudalis W. X. Li, 1999
- Yunnanilus jiuchiensis L.-N. Du, M. Hou, X.-Y. Chen & J. X. Yang, 2018
- Yunnanilus longibulla J. X. Yang, 1990
- Yunnanilus macrogaster Kottelat & X.-L. Chu, 1988
- Yunnanilus macrolepis W. X. Li, Tao & W. N. Mao, 2000
- Yunnanilus macrositanus W. X. Li, 1999
- Yunnanilus mentibarbatus Chen, Du & Liang, 2025
- Yunnanilus nanpanjiangensis W. X. Li, W. N. Mao & Z. M. Lu, 1994
- Yunnanilus paludosus Kottelat & Chu, 1988
- Yunnanilus parvus Kottelat, & Chu, 1988
- Yunnanilus pleurotaenia (Regan, 1904)
- Yunnanilus polylepis Qin, W.-H. Shao, L.-N. Du & J. X. Wang, 2024
- Yunnanilus sichuanensis R. H. Ding, 1995
- Yunnanilus spanisbripes L. An, B. S. Liu & W. X. Li, 2009
- Yunnanilus triangulus Liu, Lyu, Du & Chen, 2025
- Yunnanilus yangi Y.-R. He, X.-R. Li, X.-J. Che, X.-J. Yang, J.-S. Wang & M. Wang 2024
