= Xingyun Lake =

Lake in Yunnan, China

- Jiangchuan Sea
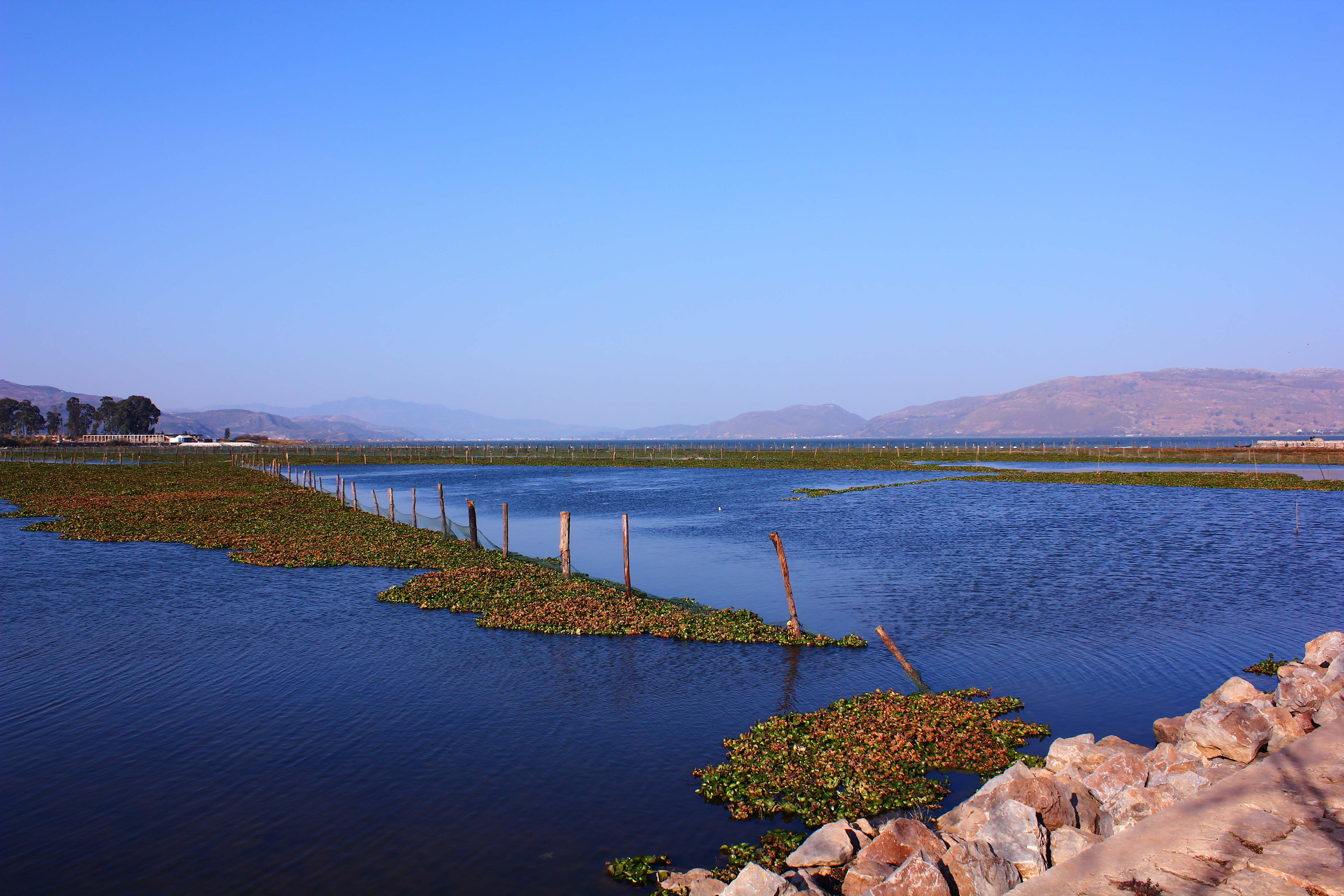

- Location within Yunnan
- Coordinates: 24°20′N 102°47′E
- Catchment area: 378 km^{2} (146 sq mi)
- Basin countries: China
- Max. length: 10.5 km (7 mi)
- Max. width: 5.8 km (4 mi)
- Surface area: 34.71 km^{2} (0 sq mi)
- Average depth: 5.3 m (17 ft)
- Max. depth: 11 m (36 ft)
- Water volume: 184×10^{6} m^{3} (6.5×10^{9} cu ft)
- Surface elevation: 1,722 m (5,650 ft)
- Settlements: Jiangchuan County

Xingyun Lake (simplified Chinese: 星云湖; traditional Chinese: 星雲湖; pinyin: Xīngyún Hú) also known as Jiangchuan Sea (Chinese: 江川海子; pinyin: Jiāngchuān Hǎizi), is a plateau lake in Yunnan Province, China. The Xingyun Lake and the Fuxian Lake are separated by a mountain and linked by a river. The lake has a total area of about 34.71 square kilometers. The average depth is 5.3 m, with an elevation of 1722 m. the water storage capacity is about 1.84×10^{8}m^{3}.
