= Luoping County =

Coordinates: 24°53′06″N 104°18′29″E

Luoping County 罗平县
- County
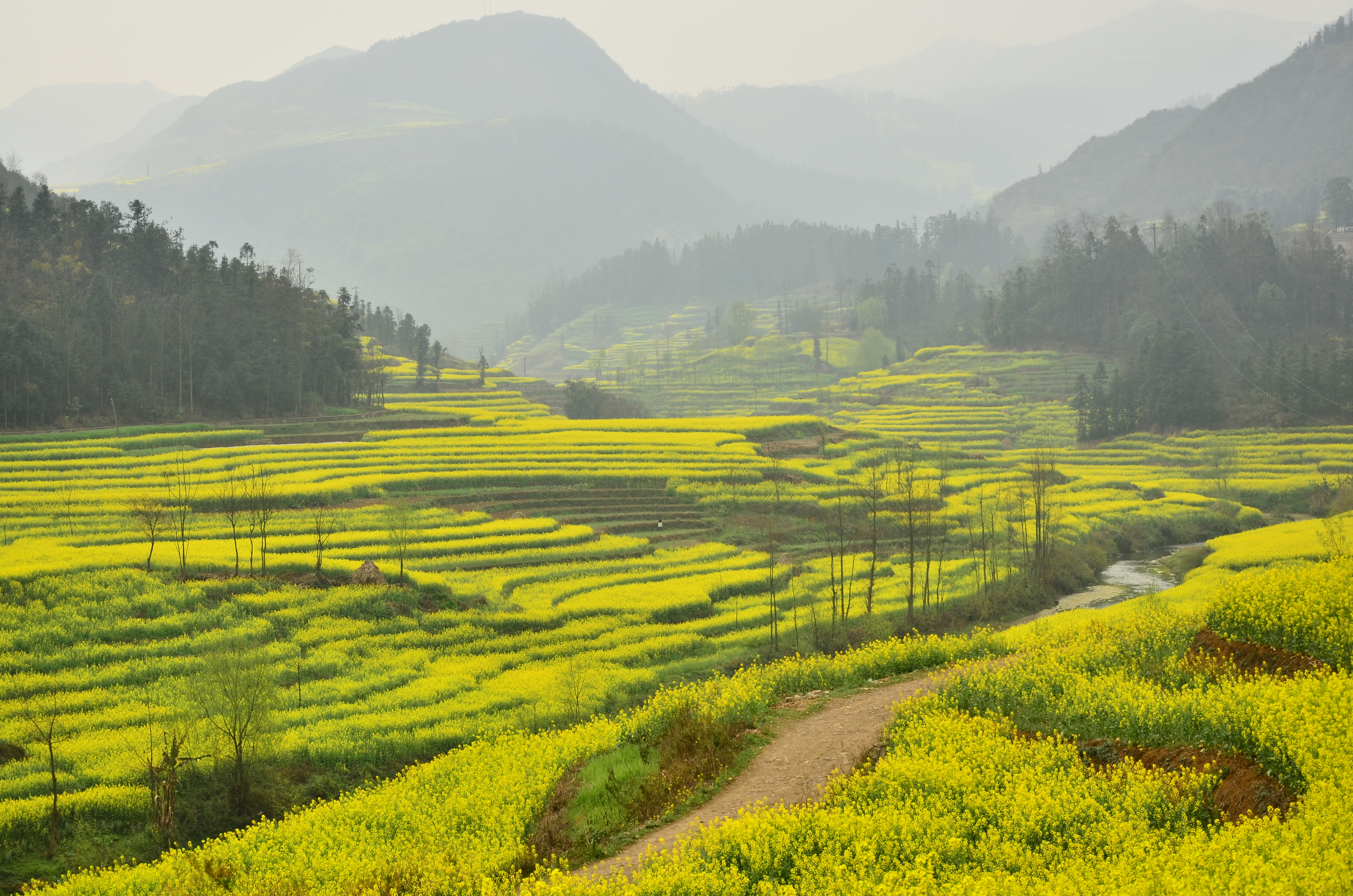
- Fields of canola in Luoping

- Location of Luoping County (red) and Qujing City (pink) within Yunnan

- Location of the seat in Yunnan
- Country: People's Republic of China
- Province: Yunnan
- Prefecture-level city: Qujing

Area
  - Total: 2,096 km^{2} (809 sq mi)

Population
  - Total: 508,345
  - Density: 242.5/km^{2} (628.2/sq mi)
- Time zone: UTC+8 (CST)
- Postal code: 655800
- Area code: 0874
- Website: www.luoping.gov.cn

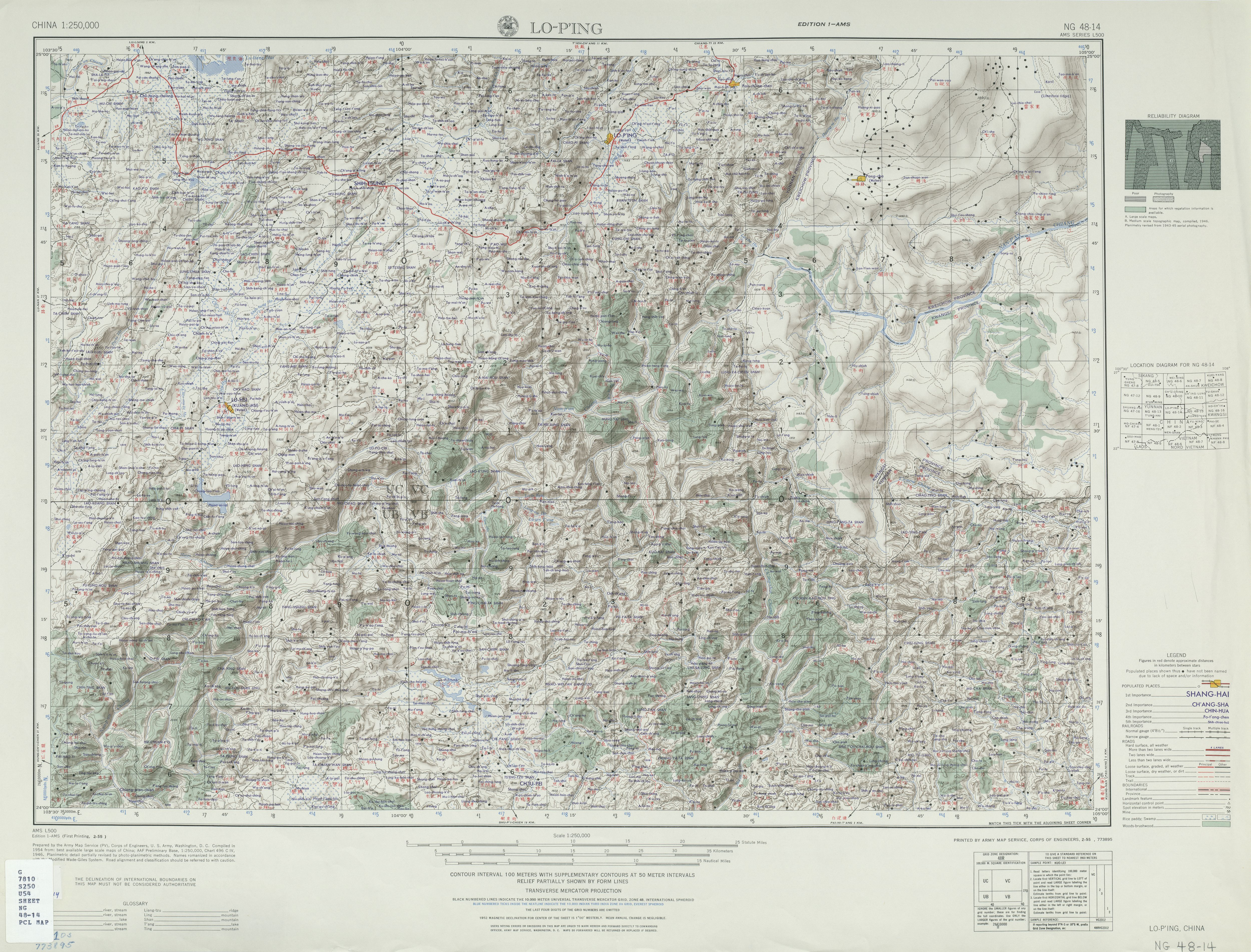
Luoping (labelled as LO-P'ING 羅平) (1954)

Luoping County (Chinese: 罗平县; pinyin: Luópíng Xiàn) is located in Qujing City, in eastern Yunnan province, China. It borders Xingyi, Guizhou to the east, Xilin County, Guangxi Zhuang Autonomous Region to the southeast, Shizong County to the southwest, and Luliang County, Qilin District and Fuyuan County, Yunnan to the northwest.

The county of Luoping in eastern Yunnan is noted for its springtime scenery, when its fields of canola (also known as rapeseed) plants are in full bloom, surrounding the area's mountains with a blanket of golden flowers.

Located near where Yunnan meets Guizhou and Guangxi, Luoping is about 240 kilometers east of Kunming. Not unlike the terraced fields of Yuanyang in southern Yunnan, Luoping's canola fields attract many photographers.

The canola flowering lasts until late June. During this high travel season for the county regular buses leave from Kunming's bus stations on an almost hourly basis.

== Administrative divisions ==
Luoping County has 3 subdistricts, 4 towns, 3 townships and 3 ethnic townships.

3 subdistricts

- Luoxiong (罗雄街道)
- Lashan (腊山街道)
- Jiulong (九龙街道)

4 towns

- Banqiao (板桥镇)
- Majie (马街镇)
- Fule (富乐镇)
- Agang (阿岗镇)

3 townships

- Dashuijing (大水井乡)
- Zhongshan (钟山乡)
- Laochang (老厂乡)

3 ethnic townships

- Lubuge Buyi and Miao (鲁布革布依族苗族乡)
- Jiuwuji Yi (旧屋基彝族乡)
- Changdi Buyi (长底布依族乡)

== Ethnic groups ==
The Luoping County Gazetteer (1995:601) lists the following Yi subgroups and their respective locations.

- Wopu 窝普 / Large Black Yi 大黑彝
  - Majie town 马街镇: Dayiben 大以本, Jiudaogou 九道沟, Jigu 吉古
  - Agang township 阿岗乡: Satuge 洒土格
- Nasupu 纳苏普 / Small Black Yi 小黑彝 (pop. 20,000+)
  - Huancheng township 环城乡: Poyi 坡衣
  - Fule town 富乐镇: Lefeng 乐丰
  - Alu township 阿鲁乡: Qile 启乐, Feige 非格
  - Agang township 阿岗乡: Yiyi 以宜
  - Jiuwuji township 旧屋基乡: Anmule 安木勒, Muxing 木星, Fawan 法弯, Laozhai 老寨
  - Majie town 马街镇: Daimo 歹墨, Luji 鲁基
  - Changdi township 长底乡: Deshao 德沙, Bazuo 把佐
- Gepu 戈仆 / Gan Yi 甘/干彝 (pop. 4,300+)
  - Huancheng township 环城乡: Zhonghe 中和, Budai 补歹
- Awu 阿武 (pop. 100)
  - Huancheng township 环城乡
- Luwu 鲁屋 / White Yi 白彝

Buyi is also spoken in Luoping County. Zhou (2013) documents the Buyi dialects of Shangmute 上木特, Xiamute 下木特, Dabulong 大补笼, and Yize 以则 villages, all of which are in Changdi Township 长底乡.

== Climate ==
Climate data for Luoping, elevation 1,483 m (4,865 ft), (1991–2020 normals, extremes 1981–2010)
Month	Jan	Feb	Mar	Apr	May	Jun	Jul	Aug	Sep	Oct	Nov	Dec	Year
Record high °C (°F)	25.4 (77.7)	29.6 (85.3)	32.3 (90.1)	34.0 (93.2)	36.0 (96.8)	32.9 (91.2)	31.9 (89.4)	30.7 (87.3)	31.3 (88.3)	29.1 (84.4)	27.2 (81.0)	26.7 (80.1)	36.0 (96.8)
Mean daily maximum °C (°F)	11.9 (53.4)	15.3 (59.5)	20.0 (68.0)	24.4 (75.9)	25.9 (78.6)	25.8 (78.4)	26.0 (78.8)	25.9 (78.6)	24.0 (75.2)	20.3 (68.5)	17.5 (63.5)	12.7 (54.9)	20.8 (69.4)
Daily mean °C (°F)	6.9 (44.4)	9.4 (48.9)	13.3 (55.9)	17.7 (63.9)	20.2 (68.4)	21.3 (70.3)	21.5 (70.7)	21.1 (70.0)	19.3 (66.7)	16.1 (61.0)	12.3 (54.1)	7.9 (46.2)	15.6 (60.0)
Mean daily minimum °C (°F)	3.7 (38.7)	5.5 (41.9)	8.6 (47.5)	12.7 (54.9)	15.9 (60.6)	18.2 (64.8)	18.6 (65.5)	18.0 (64.4)	16.3 (61.3)	13.4 (56.1)	8.8 (47.8)	4.8 (40.6)	12.0 (53.7)
Record low °C (°F)	−3.5 (25.7)	−2.3 (27.9)	−3.6 (25.5)	−3.0 (26.6)	4.3 (39.7)	11.7 (53.1)	12.7 (54.9)	11.9 (53.4)	7.1 (44.8)	3.1 (37.6)	−2.6 (27.3)	−13.5 (7.7)	−13.5 (7.7)
Average precipitation mm (inches)	35.4 (1.39)	28.4 (1.12)	36.8 (1.45)	46.9 (1.85)	149.4 (5.88)	316.9 (12.48)	326.2 (12.84)	263.6 (10.38)	185.0 (7.28)	115.2 (4.54)	36.3 (1.43)	27.2 (1.07)	1,567.3 (61.71)
Average precipitation days (≥ 0.1 mm)	15.9	12.8	12.3	11.5	15.4	20.0	21.8	21.0	17.2	17.0	11.4	13.6	189.9
Average snowy days	1.9	0.8	0	0	0	0	0	0	0	0	0.1	0.3	3.1
Average relative humidity (%)	86	78	74	71	74	84	86	87	86	88	85	87	82
Mean monthly sunshine hours	101.3	129.3	165.1	194.0	179.6	124.3	138.7	157.2	125.9	101.5	132.2	102.2	1,651.3
Percentage possible sunshine	30	40	44	51	43	30	33	39	34	29	41	31	37
Source: China Meteorological Administration
