= Chu Xin-Luo =

Chu Xinluo
- 褚新洛
- Born: 15 February 1928; Yixing, Jiangsu, China
- Died: 11 July 1991 (aged 63)
- Known for: Research on Chinese freshwater fishes, particularly catfish and cypriniform fishes, and the fishes of Yunnan
- Awards: Chinese Academy of Sciences Natural Science Award, Second Prize (1991)
- Scientific career
- Fields: Ichthyology
- Workplaces: Institute of Hydrobiology, Chinese Academy of Sciences; Kunming Institute of Zoology

Chu Xin-Luo (褚新洛; 15 February 1928 – 11 July 1991) was a Chinese ichthyologist from Yixing, Jiangsu. He worked at the Institute of Hydrobiology, Chinese Academy of Sciences from 1953 until early 1966.

After being transferred as a key scientific staff member to the Kunming Institute of Zoology, he served as director of the Vertebrate Taxonomy Research Laboratory, researcher, and doctoral supervisor. He made contributions to the study of China's freshwater fishes, particularly catfish and cypriniform fishes, as well as the fishes of Yunnan.

== Major scholarly works ==
- Fishes of Yunnan (云南鱼类志), by Chu Xinluo and Yang Junxing, Science Press, 1989–1990, ISBN 9787030009395 and 9787030012418. The work received the Second Prize of the Chinese Academy of Sciences Natural Science Award in 1991.
- Fauna Sinica: Osteichthyes. Siluriformes, by Chu Xinluo, Zheng Baoshan, Dai Dingyuan et al., Science Press, 1999.
- Fauna Sinica: Osteichthyes. Cypriniformes, Volume 2, by Chen Yiyu, Chu Xinluo et al., Science Press, 1998.
