= Han conquest of Dian =

2nd century BC conflicts between the Han dynasty and the Dian Kingdom

Han campaigns against Dian
- Part of the Southward expansion of the Han dynasty
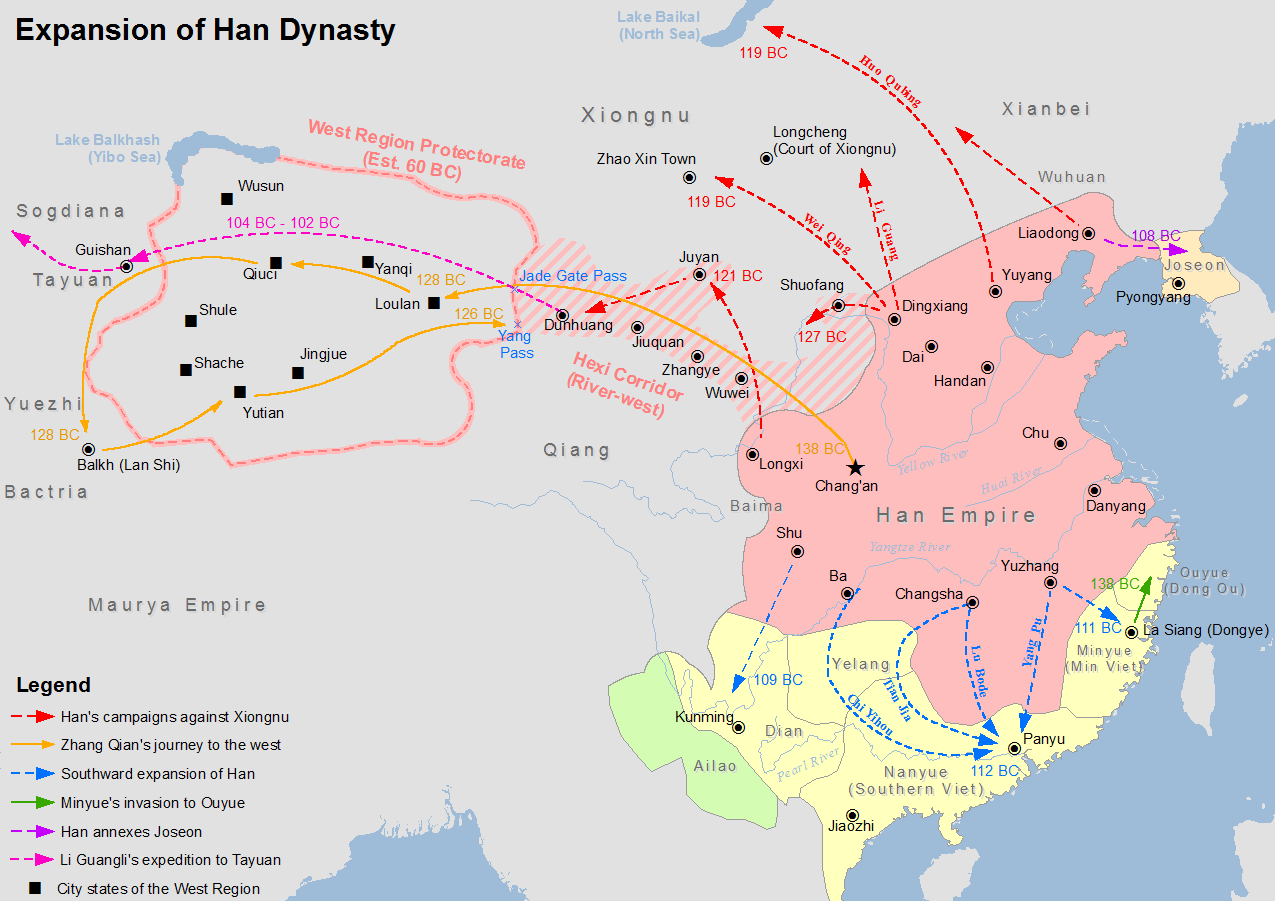
- The expansion of Han dynasty in 2nd century BC
Date	135 BC, 109 BC, others
Location	Yunnan
Result	135 BC: Jianwei commandery and trade routes established by Han; 109 BC: Han settlement and migration southward; Cultural assimilation and displacement of the Dian by the Han Empire; Dian annexed by the Han Empire and Yizhou commandery established

Belligerents
Han Empire; Yelang	Dian Kingdom

Strength
Unknown	30,000

The Han conquest of Dian was a series of military campaigns and expeditions by the Western Han dynasty recorded in contemporary textual sources against the Dian Kingdom in modern-day Yunnan. Dian was placed under Western Han rule in 109 BC, after Emperor Wu of Han dispatched an army against the kingdom as the empire expanded southward.

== Background ==
Dian was an ancient kingdom situated in modern Yunnan, southwestern China. According to Han historian, Sima Qian, it was established in 279 BC by Zhuang Qiao, a general of Chu during the Warring States period. He was sent to the region around Dian Lake as part of a Chu military campaign. When the Chu homeland was invaded by the Qin, Zhuang Qiao decided to stay in Yunnan and established the Dian kingdom. The Qin dynasty was subsequently overthrown by the Han, and the commanderies of the new dynasty, Ba and Shu, bordered Dian.

In 135 BC, the Han envoy Tang Meng brought gifts to the king of Yelang, a kingdom bordering Dian, and convinced him to submit to the Han. The Jianwei Commandery was established in the region. In 122 BC, Emperor Wu dispatched four groups of envoys to the southwest in search of a route to Daxia in Central Asia. One group was welcomed by the king of Dian but none of them were able to make it any further as they were blocked from going any further north by the Sui and Kunming tribes in the Erhai region and the Di and Zuo tribes in the south. However they learned that further west there was a kingdom called Dianyue where the people rode elephants and traded with the merchants from Shu in secret.

Han observers saw Dian as a potential periphery that could be absorbed by the empire beyond its frontiers. Dian was a major business center, linked by networks of prosperous trading routes to modern South and Southeast Asia. The trade connections were seen as attractive to the Han rulers as they desired areas with prosperous maritime trade routes. These incentives motivated Emperor Wu to extend the Han dynasty's control further southwest to secure access to products such as silk and bamboo, iron, tin, and silver.

== Campaigns ==
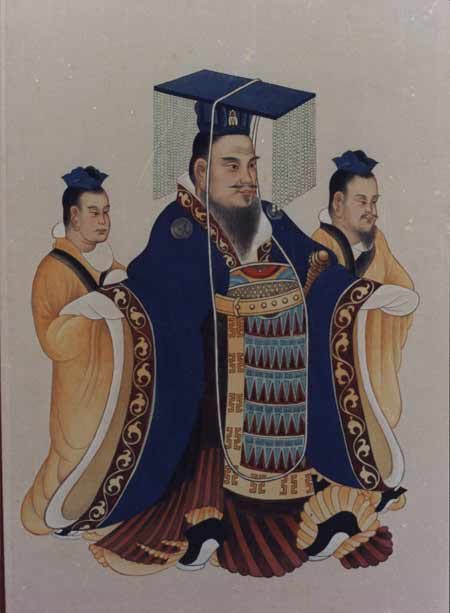
Emperor Wu of Han dispatched military forces against the Dian in 109 BC.

A military campaign dispatched by Emperor Wu of Han in 109 BC invaded the region and annexed the Dian Kingdom. The Dian King willingly received the Han forces in the hopes of assistance against rival tribes. It was at this time he received a seal from the Han, and became a tributary.

== Aftermath ==
The Dian Kingdom was conquered by the Han Empire in 109 BC and turned into a tributary state. As the following centuries went by, the Dian assimilated into Han Chinese culture and were virtually extinct by the 11th century AD. It is apparent in the artifacts uncovered by archaeologists in the area. Mirrors, coins, ceramics, and bronze items manufactured in the Han style have been found in modern Yunnan. Dian artifacts, once visually distinct from the Han, borrowed heavily from Han imports by 100 BC, indicative of Dian's assimilation into Han Chinese culture.

Sinification of these peoples was brought about by a combination of Han imperial military power, regular Han Chinese settlement and an influx of Han refugees. Yizhou commandery was established in the former kingdom. Dian's surrender was verified by archaeologists, who discovered an imperial seal inscribed by the Han for the king of Dian. There were a series of unsuccessful rebellions by the Dian against Han rule. The first two incidents occurred in 86 BC and 83 BC. A rebellion in 35 BC–28 BC was suppressed by Chen Li, governor of the Zangke commandery. More violence surfaced during Wang Mang's usurpation of the Han emperor and reign in 9–23. Wang responded by dispatching military campaigns against the southwest. One campaign lost 70% of its soldiers due to illness. Another, with 100,000 men and twice the amount of supplies, had little success. Rebellions also occurred in 42–45 and 176.

During Emperor Ming of Han's reign in 57–75, the Han expanded further west of Dian and established a new commandery called Yongchang. In 114, Dian tribes residing west of Yuexi/Yuesui Commandery accepted Han rule. Emperor Huan embarked on a sinicization campaign during his reign between 146 and 168 that introduced Han Chinese ethics and culture to the Dian tribes.

== Bibliography ==
- Amies, Alex; Ban, Gu (2020). Hanshu Volume 95 The Southwest Peoples, Two Yues, and Chaoxian: Translation with Commentary. Gutenberg Self Publishing Press. ISBN 978-0-9833348-7-3.
- Ebrey, Patricia Buckley (2010). The Cambridge Illustrated History of China. Cambridge University Press. ISBN 978-0-521-12433-1.
- Xu, Pingfang (2005). The Formation of Chinese Civilization: An Archaeological Perspective. Yale University Press. ISBN 978-0-300-09382-7.
- Marks, Robert B. (2017). China: An Environmental History. Rowman & Littlefield Publishers. ISBN 978-1442212756.
- Watson, Burton (1993), Records of the Grand Historian by Sima Qian: Han Dynasty II (Revised Edition, Columbia University Press
- Watson, William (2000). The Arts of China to Ad 900. Yale University Press. ISBN 978-0-300-08284-5.
- Yu, Yingshi (1986). Denis Twitchett; Michael Loewe (eds.). Cambridge History of China: Volume I: the Ch'in and Han Empires, 221 B.C. – A.D. 220. University of Cambridge Press. ISBN 978-0-5212-4327-8.
