= Dian kingdom =

Former country

Dian 滇
- 8th century BC–109 BC
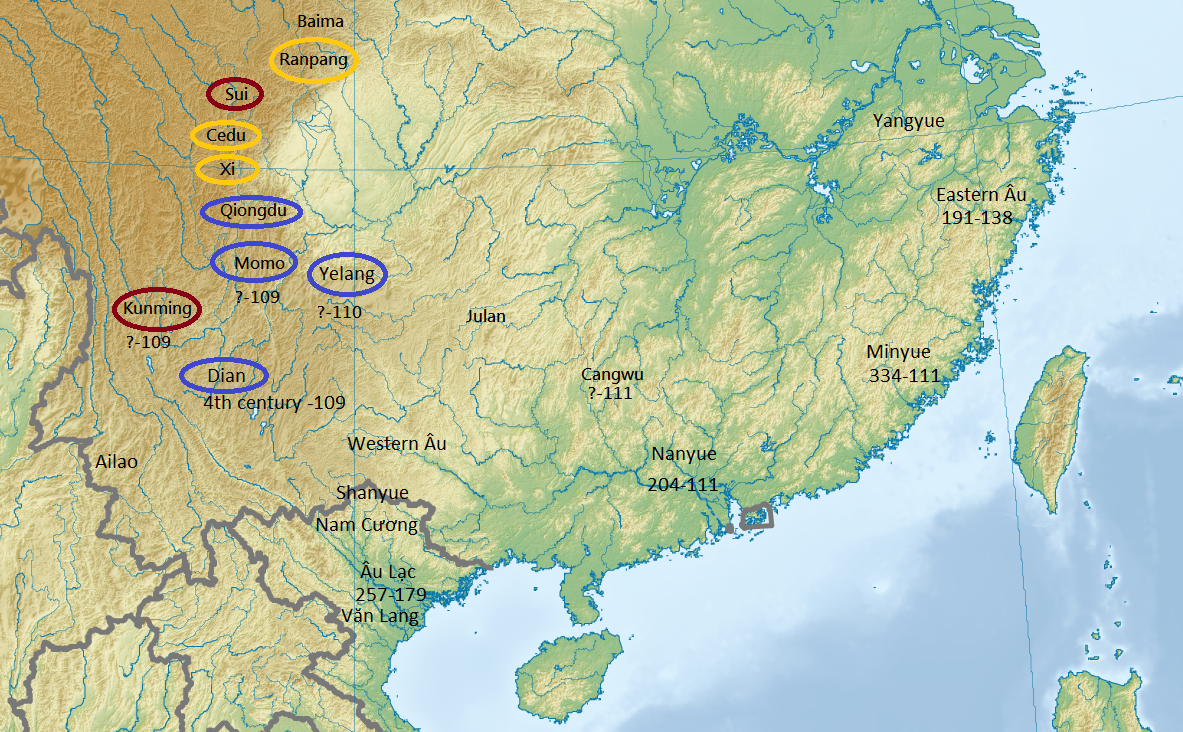
- Dian and the southwestern peoples in the early Han period. Red means nomadic, yellow is semi-nomadic, and purple is sedentary.

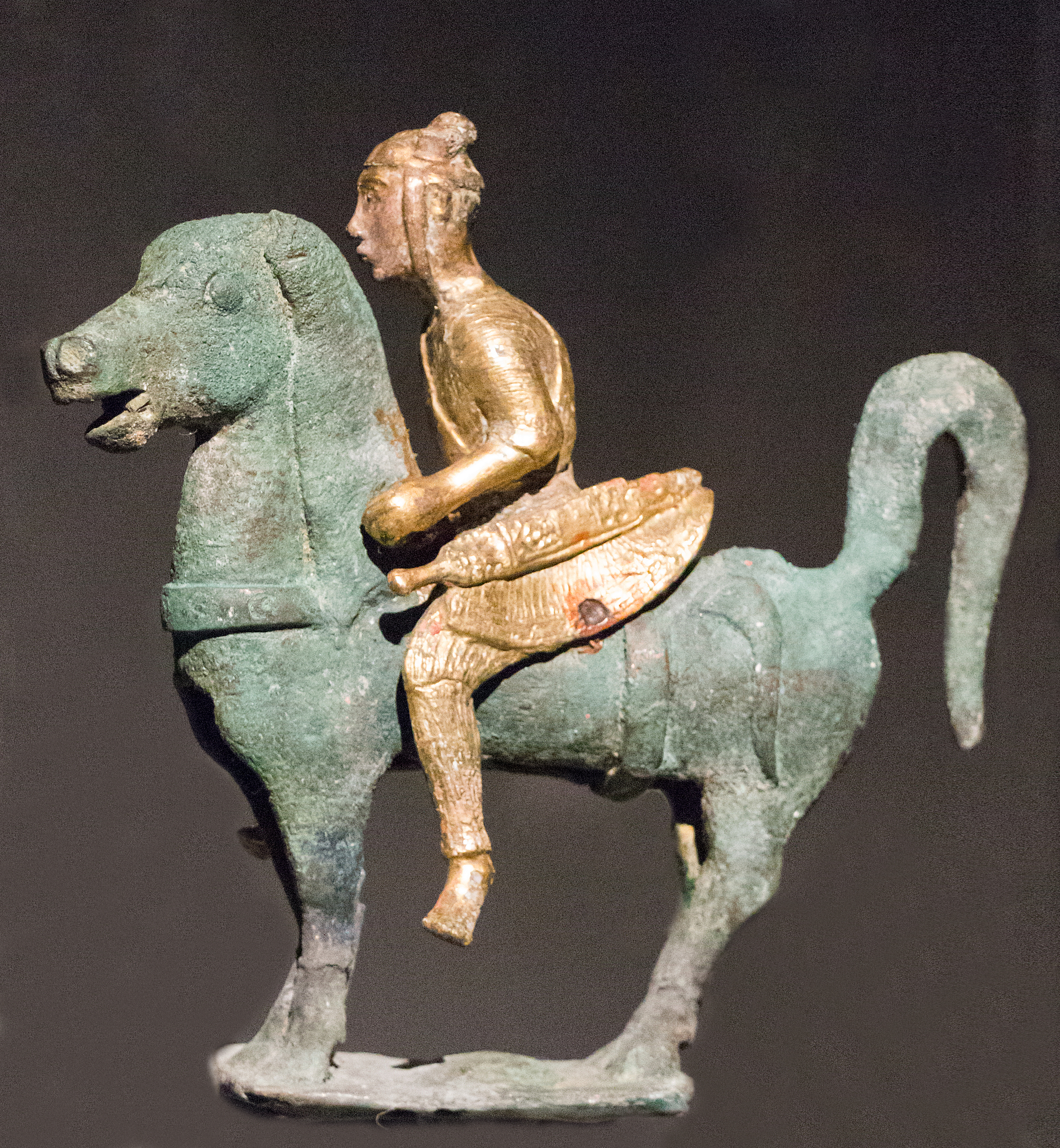
- Dian horserider, from a bronze cowry container
- Capital: Today's Jinning District; 24.666667°N 102.591667°E
- Government: Monarchy
- History
  - Established: 8th century BC
  - Annexed by the Han dynasty: 109 BC
| Succeeded by |
| Han dynasty; Ailao Kingdom |
- Today part of: China

Dian (Chinese: 滇) was an ancient kingdom established by the Dian people, a non-Han metalworking civilization that inhabited around the Dian Lake plateau of central northern Yunnan, China from the late Spring and Autumn period until the Eastern Han dynasty. The Dian buried their dead in vertical pit graves. The Dian language was likely one of the Tibeto-Burman languages. The Han Empire's annexation of the Dian kingdom in 109 BC eventually led to the establishment of the Yizhou commandery. Dian culture started from at least the 8th century BC, until it fell under the control of the Han dynasty in 109 BC.

== History ==
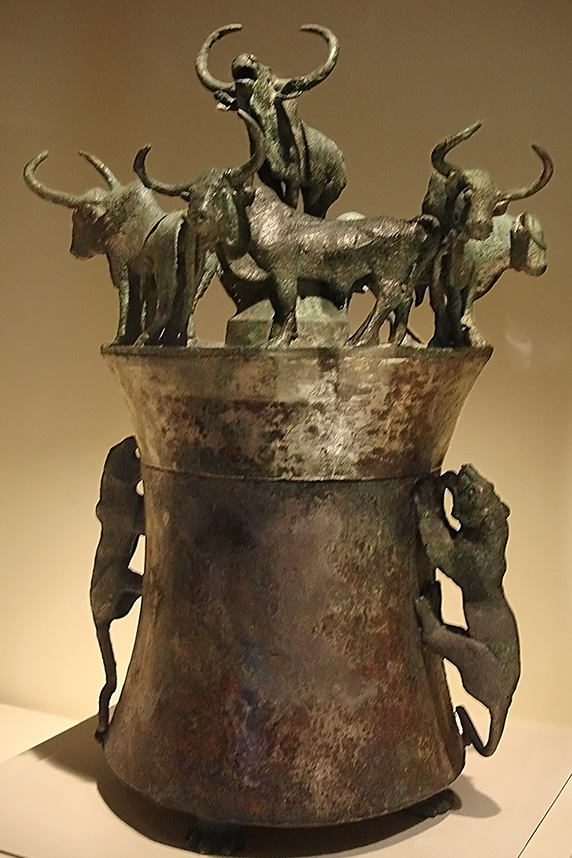
A bronze vessel showing seven oxen being hunted by two tigers, made by the Dian people.

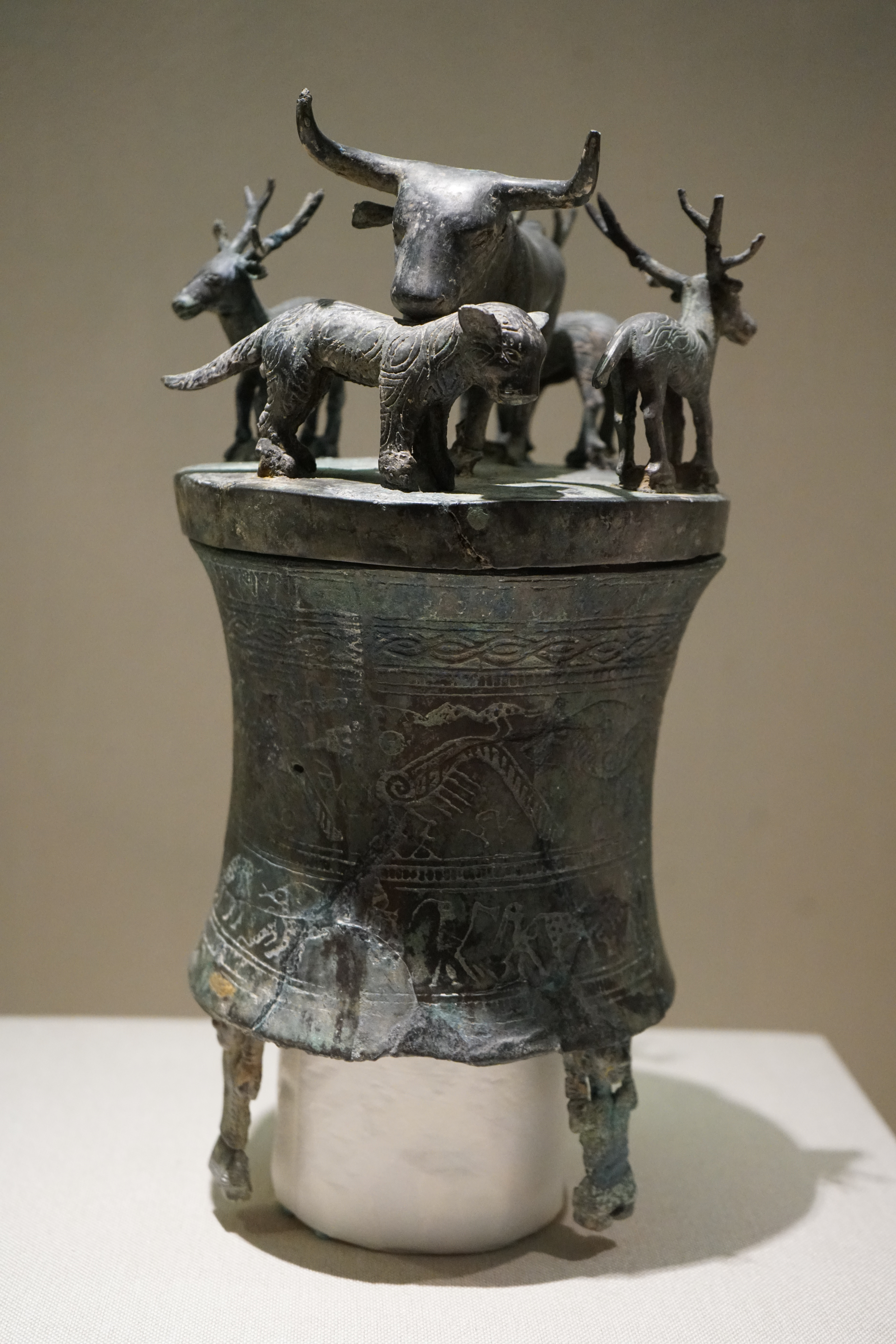
Bronze vessel featuring tiger, deer, and ox

Dian was an ancient kingdom situated in modern Yunnan, southwestern China, in the region around the Dian Lake. According to Han historian, Sima Qian, it was established in 279 BC when King Qingxiang of Chu sent a military force to the southwest. Zhuang Qiao, a general of Chu, reached the Dian Lake as part of the Chu military campaign. When the Chu homeland was invaded by the Qin, Zhuang Qiao decided to stay in Yunnan and adopt the native ways, establishing the Dian kingdom. The Qin dynasty was subsequently overthrown by the Han, and the commanderies of the new dynasty, Ba and Shu, bordered Dian.

According to the Shiji, the southwest was dominated by barbarians, among whom the ruler of Yelang was the most powerful. To the west of Yelang were the Mimo and the most powerful among them was the ruler of Dian. North of Dian was Qiongdu. All these people styled their hair in a mallet-shaped fashion. These were settled peoples who worked the fields and lived in settlements.

In the area from Tongshi east to Yeyu were the Sui and Kunming tribes who braided their hair and moved from place to place with their herds. They had no fixed abodes or rulers. Northeast of the Sui were the Xi and Zuodu. The most powerful of the Zuodu were the Ran and Mang, who lived west of Shu. Some of them moved from place and place but others lived in fixed abodes. Northeast of the Ran and Mang were the Baima, who belonged to the Di tribe.

Shu is the only place that makes ju berry sauce. large quantities of it are exported in secret to the markets of Yelang, which is situated on the Zangke. The Zangke at that point is over 100 paces across, wide enough to allow boats to move up and down it. The king of Southern Yue sends money and goods in an effort to gain control of Yelang, extending his efforts as far west as Tongshi, but so far he has not succeeded in getting Yelang to acknowledge his sovereignty.

— Shiji

In 135 BC, the Han envoy Tang Meng brought gifts to Duotong, the king of Yelang, which bordered Dian, and convinced him to submit to the Han. The Jianwei Commandery was established in the region. In 122 BC, Emperor Wu dispatched four groups of envoys to the southwest in search of a route to Daxia in Central Asia. One group was welcomed by the king of Dian but none of them were able to make it any further as they were blocked in the north by the Sui and Kunming tribes of the Erhai region and in the south by the Di and Zuo tribes. However they learned that further west there was a kingdom called Dianyue where the people rode elephants and traded with the merchants from Shu in secret.

In 111 BC, Emperor Wu of Han ordered the barbarian tribes of Jianwei Commandery to raise troops for the campaign against Nanyue. Fearing that neighboring tribes would attack them in the absence of their men, the tribe of Julan rebelled against the Han and killed the governor of Jianwei Commandery. After Nanyue was defeated, Han forces turned north and subjugated the various tribes of Yelang, Julan, Toulan, Qiong, Zuo, Ran, and Mang.

The Dian kingdom was annexed by the Han under the reign of Emperor Wu of Han in 109 BC and the Yizhou commandery established. The Dian King willingly received the Chinese invasion in the ambition of assistance against rival tribes. It was at this time he received his seal from the Chinese, and became a tributary.

Emperor Wu sent Wang Ranyu to persuade the king of Dian to submit, pointing out that many of the neighboring tribes had already been defeated. The king of Dian was initially reluctant to accept the offer for he still possessed some 30,000 troops as well as the allegiance of the nearby Laojin and Mimo tribes. However, in 109 BCE, Han troops from Ba and Shu wiped out the Laojin and Mimo, leading the king of Dian to surrender. While Dian became Yizhou Commandery, the king was allowed to continue his rule until a rebellion during the reign of Emperor Zhao of Han. The Han proceeded with colonization and conquered the people of Kunming in 86 and 82 BC, reaching all the way to what is now modern day Myanmar.

== Royal burials ==
The Dian buried their kings at Shizhaishan, which was uncovered in 1954 near Shizhai Village in Jinning County, Yunnan. The burials were identified by the inscription King Dian's Seal. The inscription was written in seal script on a gold imperial seal of investiture given by the Han Emperor. Sima Qian noted that the Dian were one of only two local groups to have received an imperial seal, the other being Yelang. Both have survived: the Yelang Seal emerged in 2007 from a Hmong man in Guizhou, claiming to be the Yelang King's 75th generation descendant. The Dian Kingdom's elite used elements of the Chu state's aristocratic mortuary practices.

== Culture ==
=== Bronze working ===
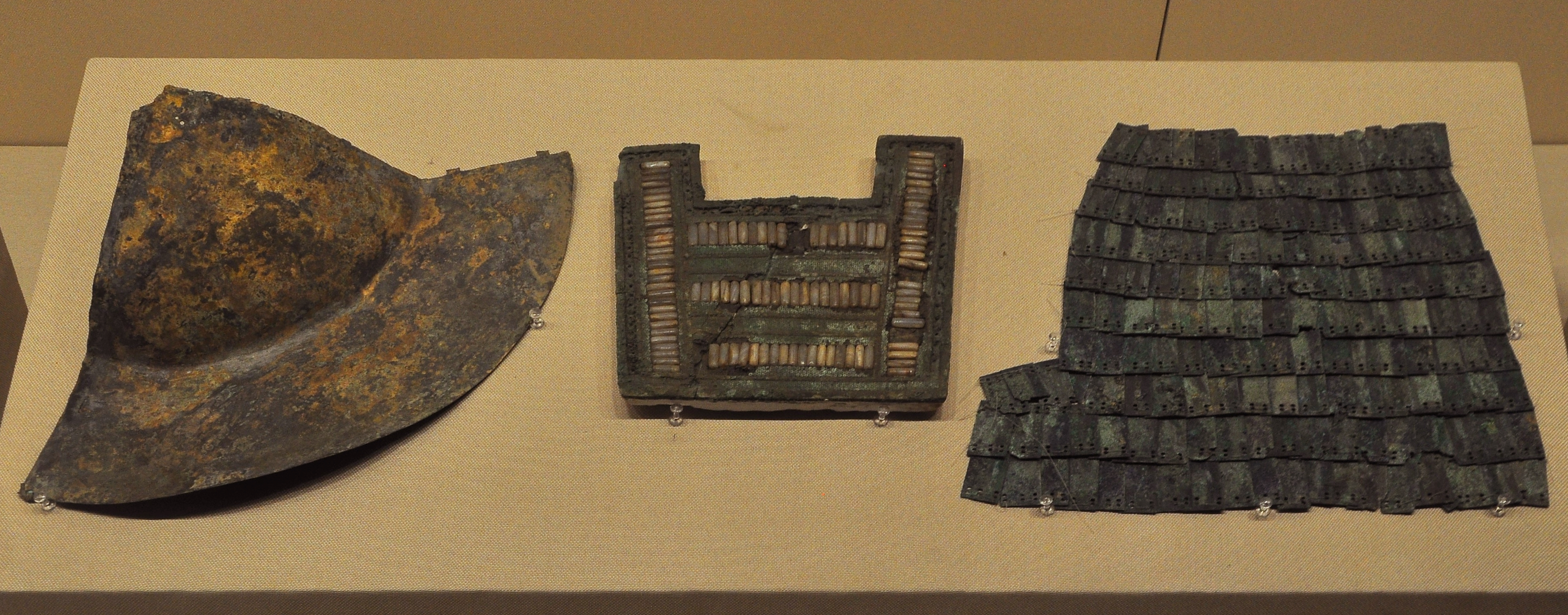
Bronze helmet piece and lamellar armour from Yunnan, Western Han period

The largest tin deposits on the Eurasian continent are located on the Malay peninsula, and as such, the Dian people were sophisticated metal workers, casting both bronze and iron. The Dian cast bronze objects using both the piece mould method and the lost wax method. Dian elite burials contained an impressive array of bronze objects, although late Dian burials also contained locally cast iron objects.

Large bronze drums were employed by the Dian to communicate in battle; ritual burials of Dian elites were accompanied by large bronze drums filled with cowrie shells. The tops of the drums were removed and replaced by a bronze lid.

Dian weapon types and decorative motifs had some commonalities with Chu.

=== Saka influences ===
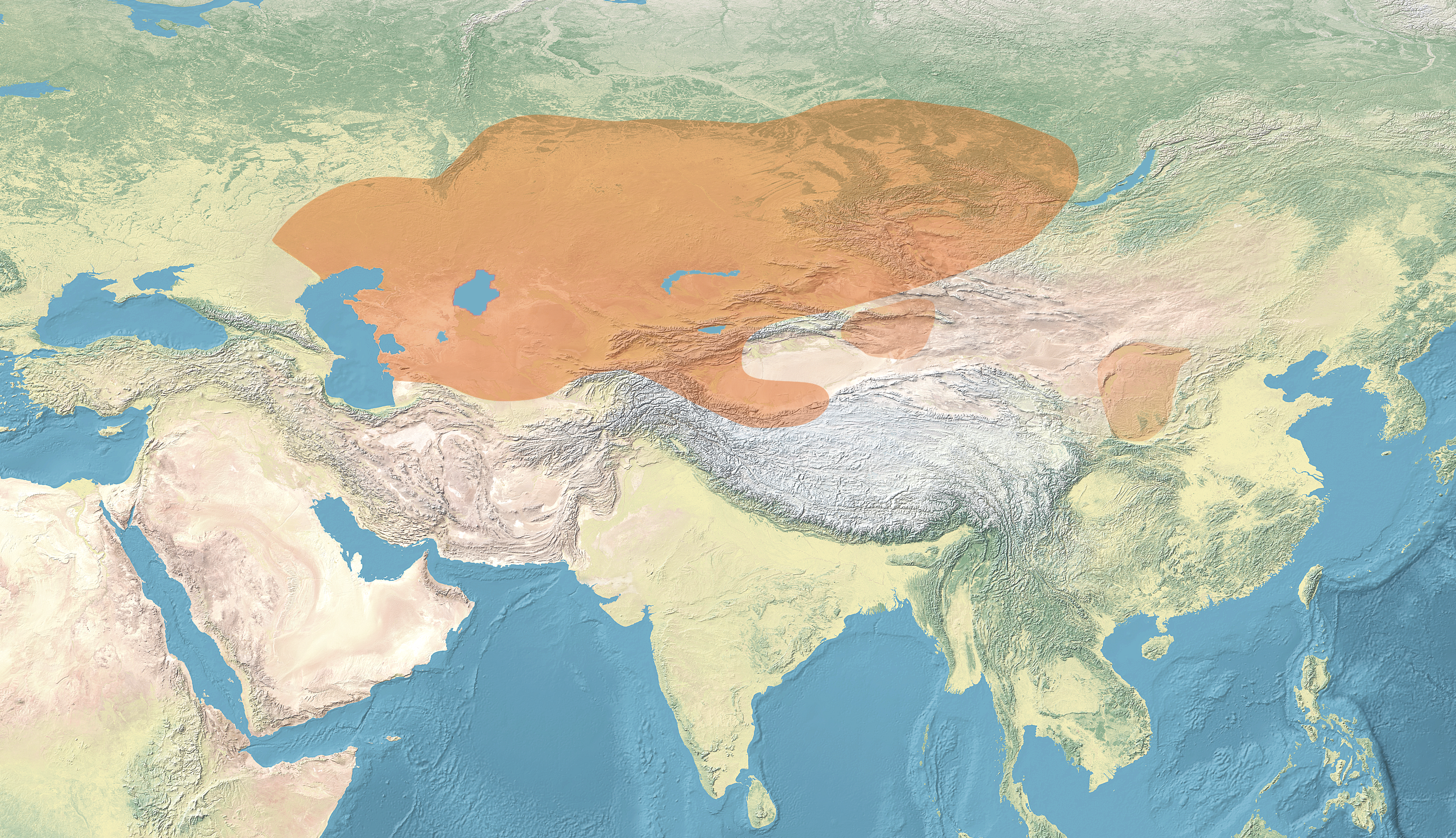
The Dian kingdom, with contemporary polities and the Saka realm ( ) c. 200 BC

Iaroslav Lebedynsky and Victor H. Mair speculate that some Sakas may also have migrated to the area of Yunnan in southern China following their expulsion by the Yuezhi in the 2nd century BC. Excavations of the prehistoric art of the Dian civilization of Yunnan have revealed hunting scenes similar to that of Indo-European artwork depicting horsemen in Central Asian clothing. Horsemen practising hunting are depicted in circular arrangement on top of drums, a design often encountered in Scythian art. Animal scenes of felines attacking oxen are also at times reminiscent of Scythian art both in theme and in composition. These objects reflect the influence of steppe art.

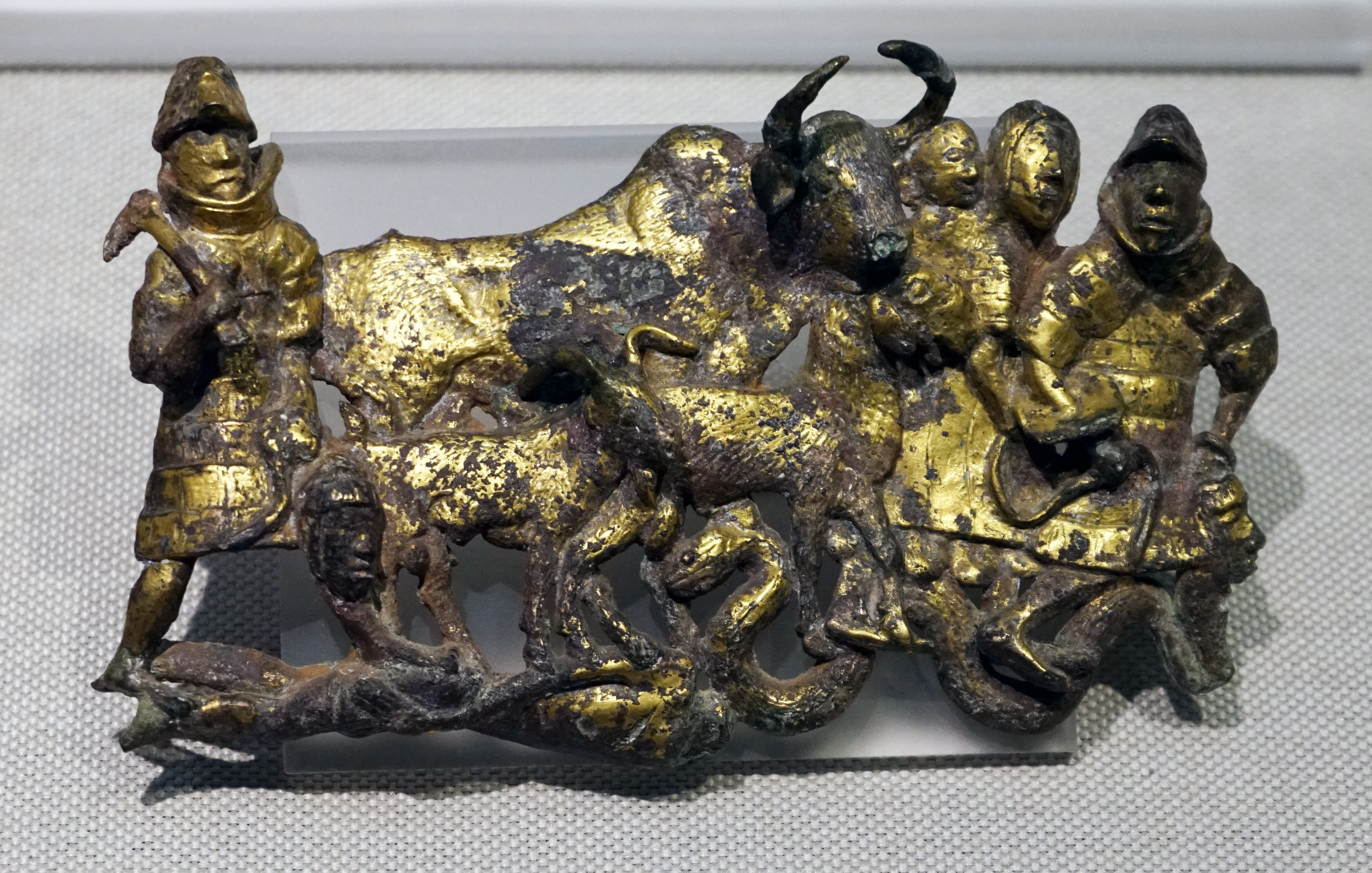
The ox is featured heavily in Dian artwork. This bronze belt buckle for example shows Dian armoured warriors around an ox and its calves.

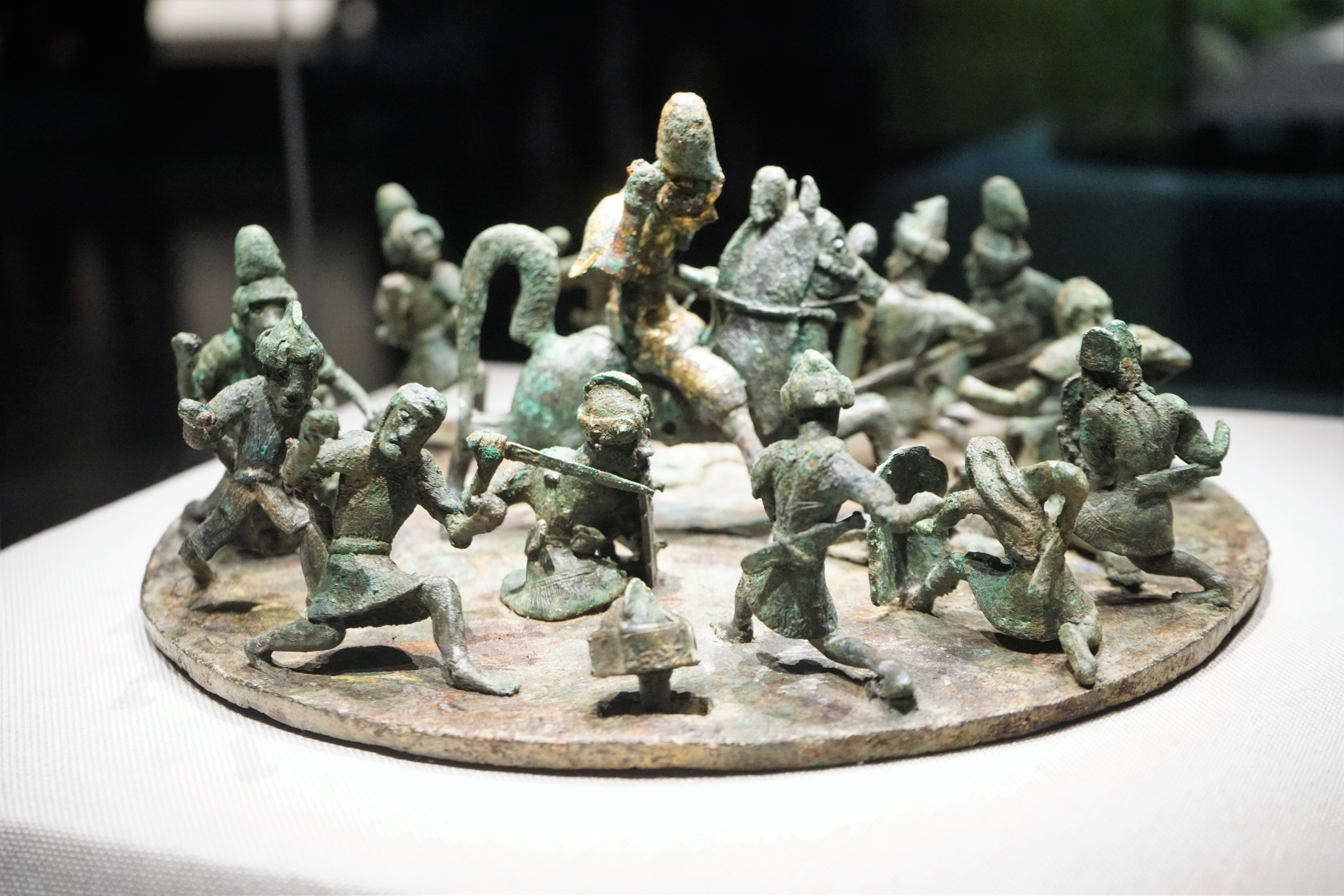
Dian bronze lid depicting a horseman in battle

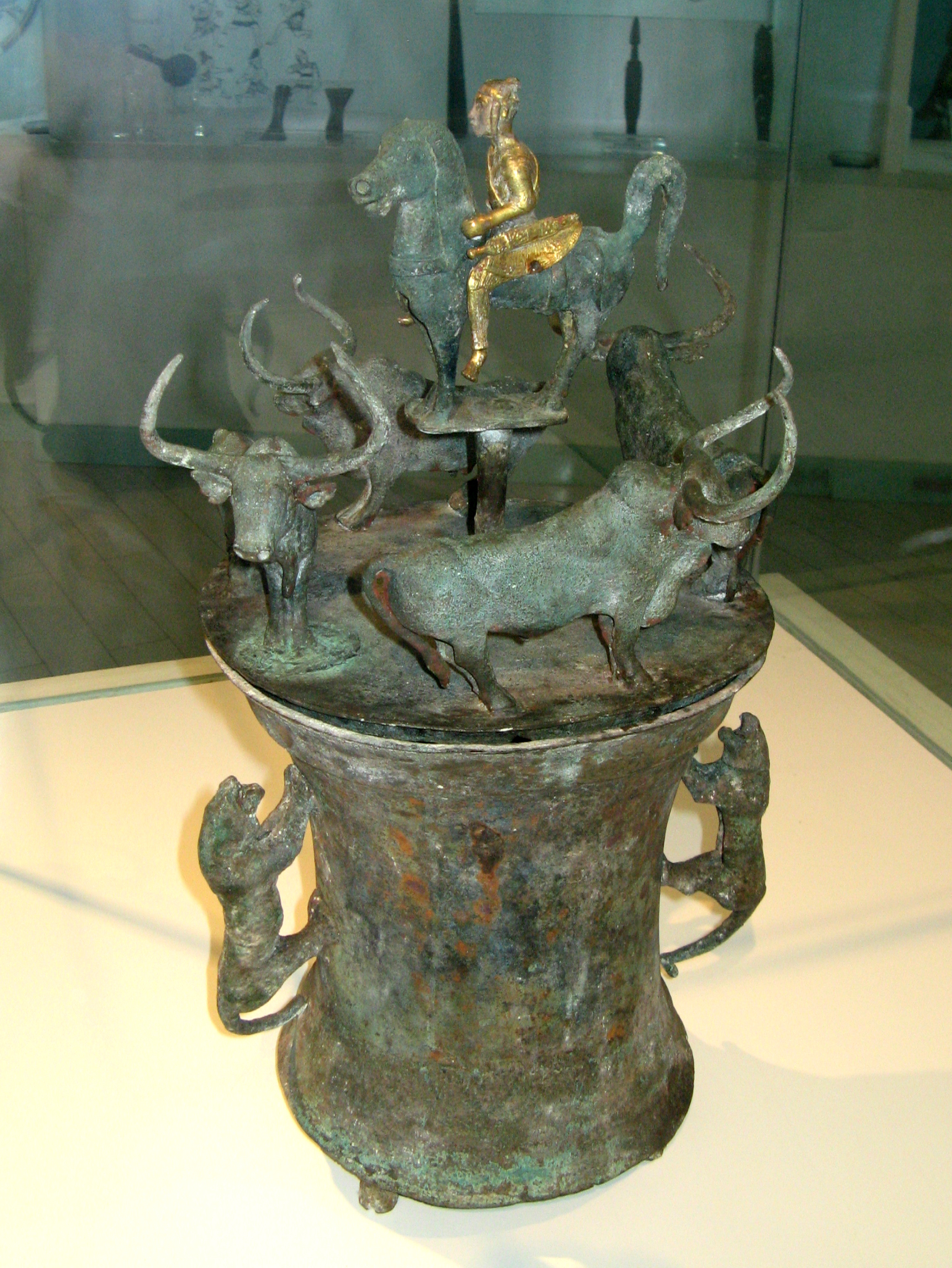
Dian vessel depicting a horseman surrounded by four oxen being hunted by tigers

=== Depiction of Dian society ===
The bronze lids were covered with miniature figurines and structures, depicting various scenes from the life of the Dian people. The bronze lids depicted the Dian people engaged in everyday activities such as hunting, farming and weaving. Other scenes depicted the leisurely pursuits of the Dian people, such as bullfighting, dancing and music-making. The Dian people dressed in tunics over short pants and wore their hair in topknots. The bronze lids corroborated Sima Qian's description of the Dian hairstyle.

Many scenes depicted the Dian at war, often riding horses. Archaeological evidence shows that horses had been domesticated by the Dian people as early as the sixth century BC. The bronze lids also depicted the Dian decapitating their enemies (who wore their hair in long plaits).

The kingdom was based on agriculture, the bronzes also showed head hunting, human sacrifice, and slaves as part of Dian society.

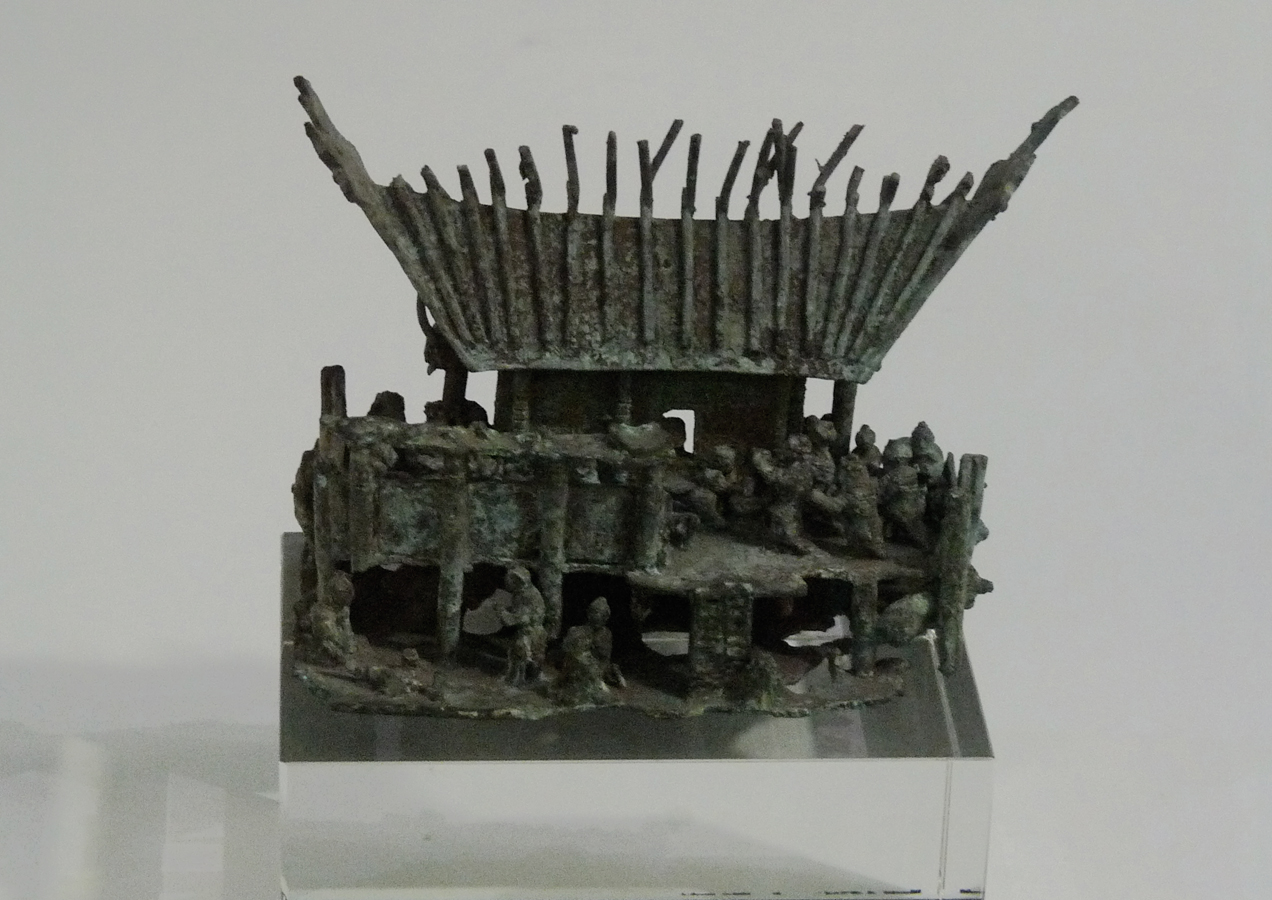
Dian bronze model of a house

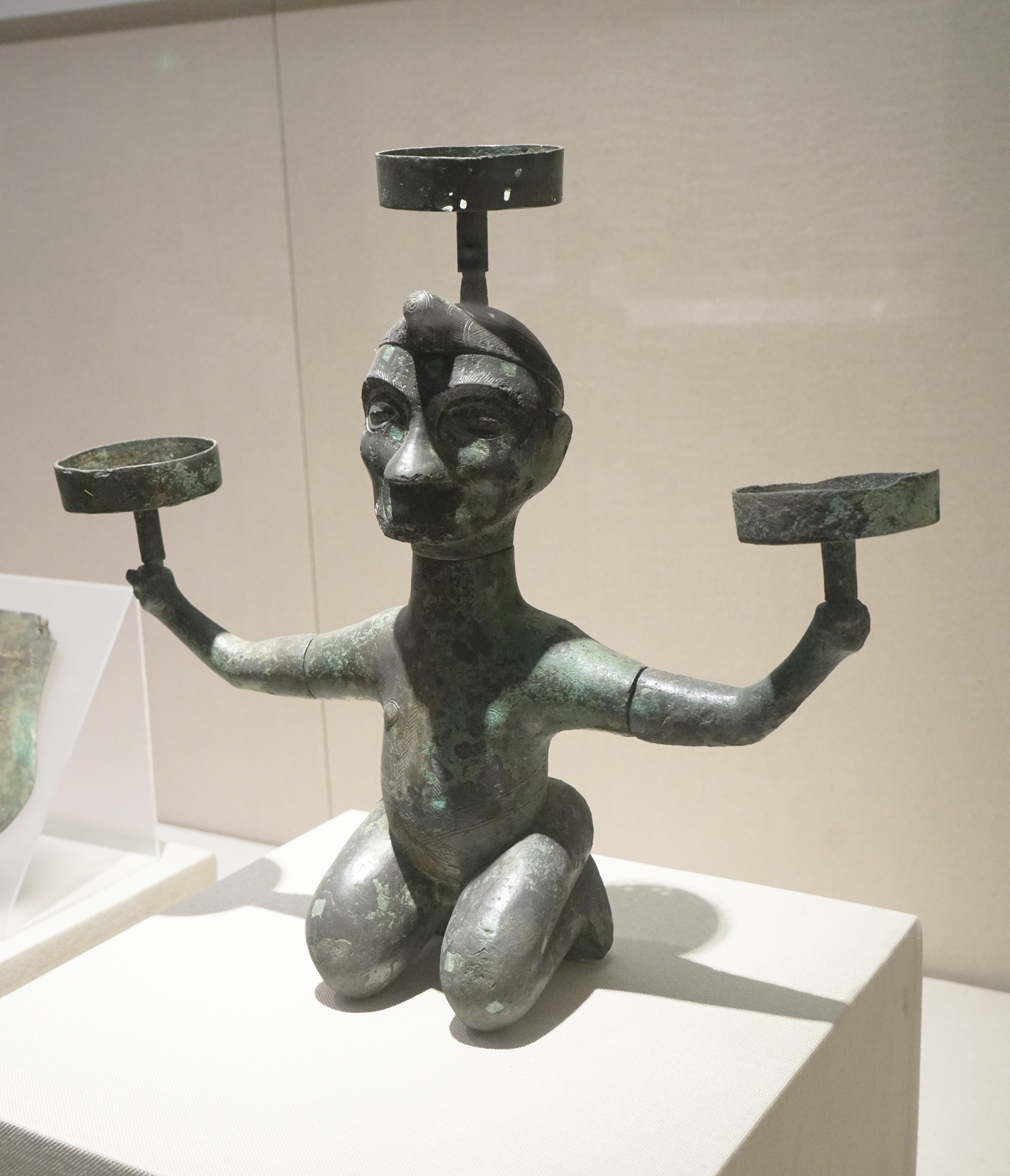
Dian lamp in the shape of a servant

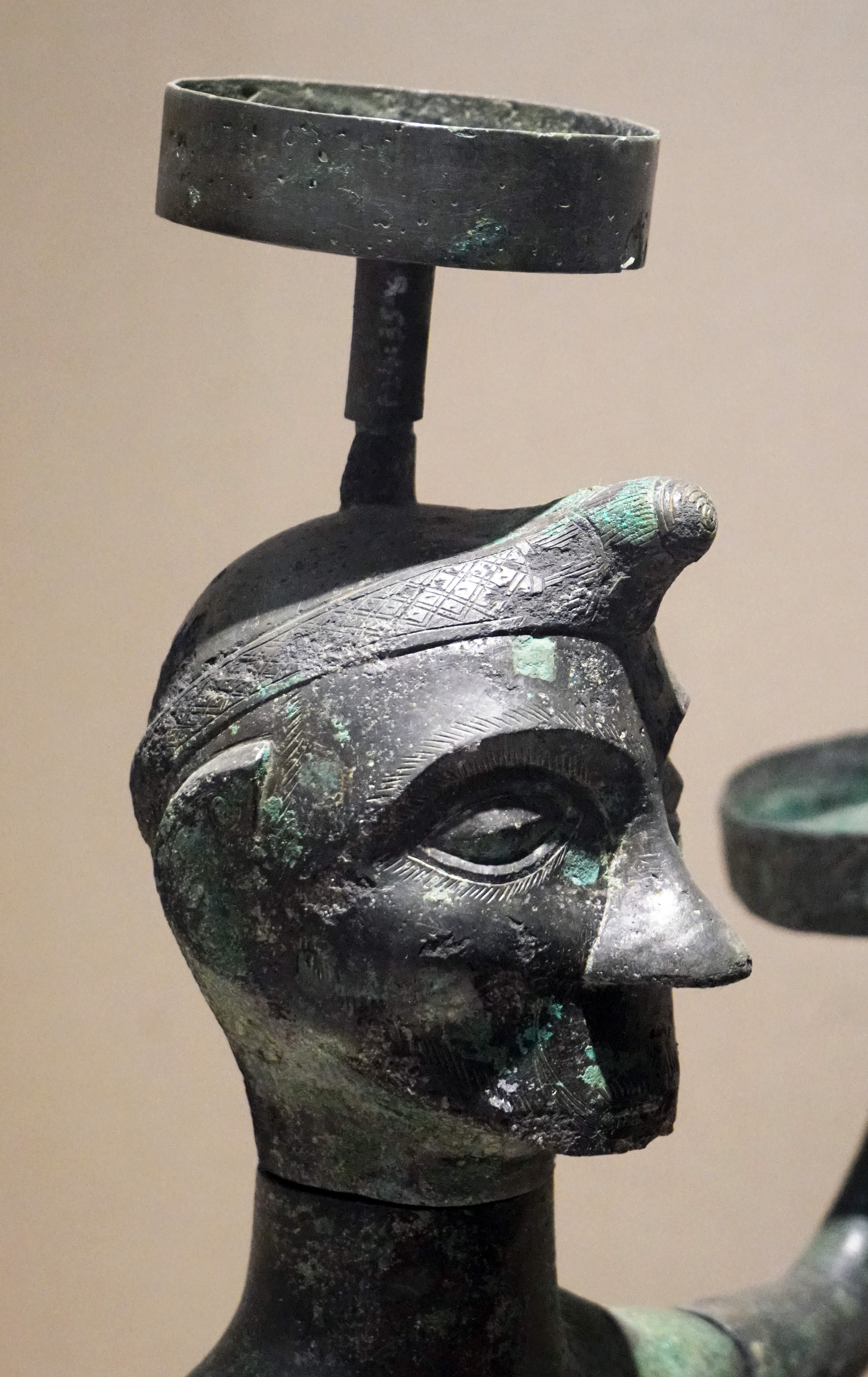
Face of a Dian person

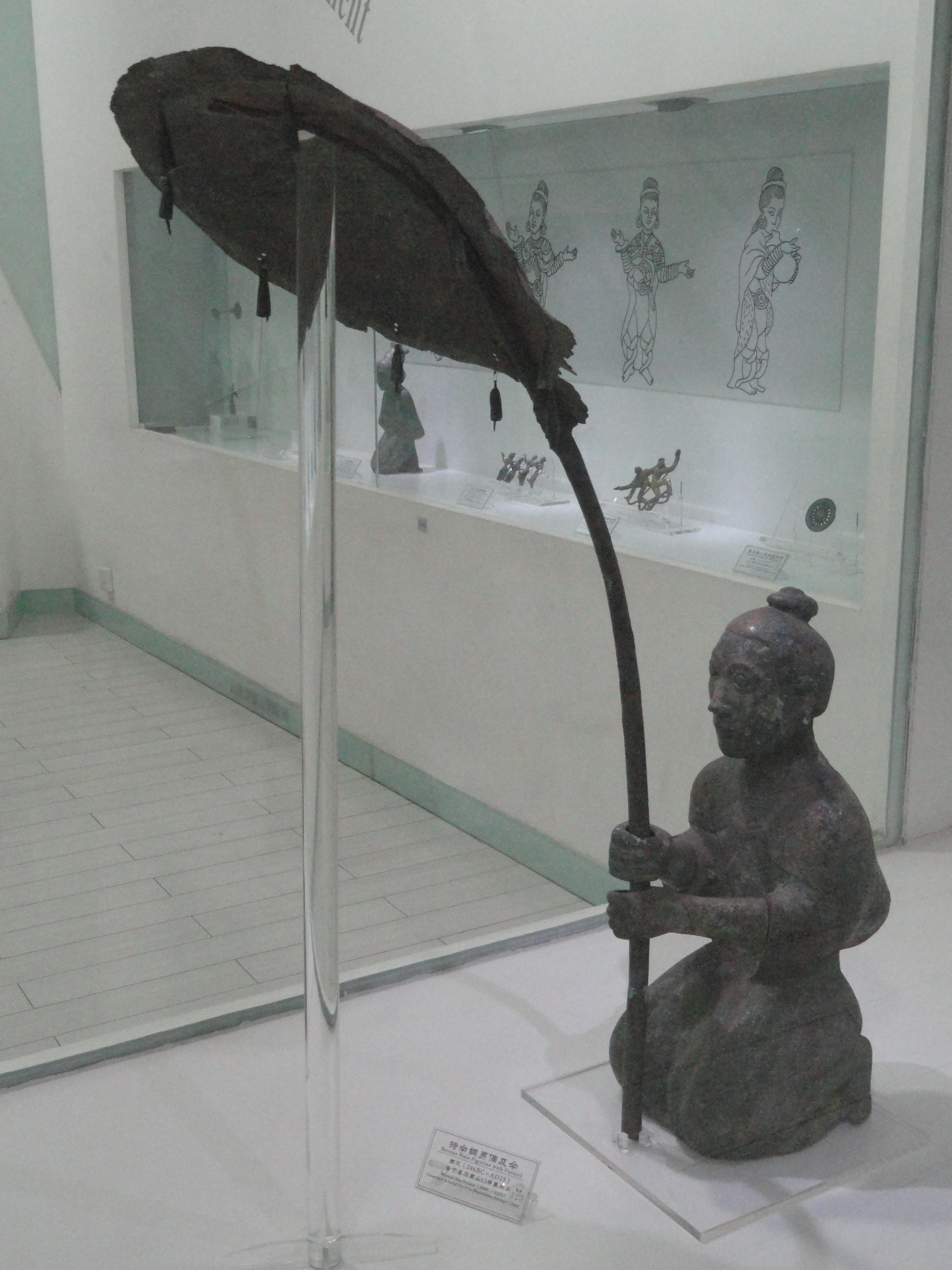
Dian servant with a parasol

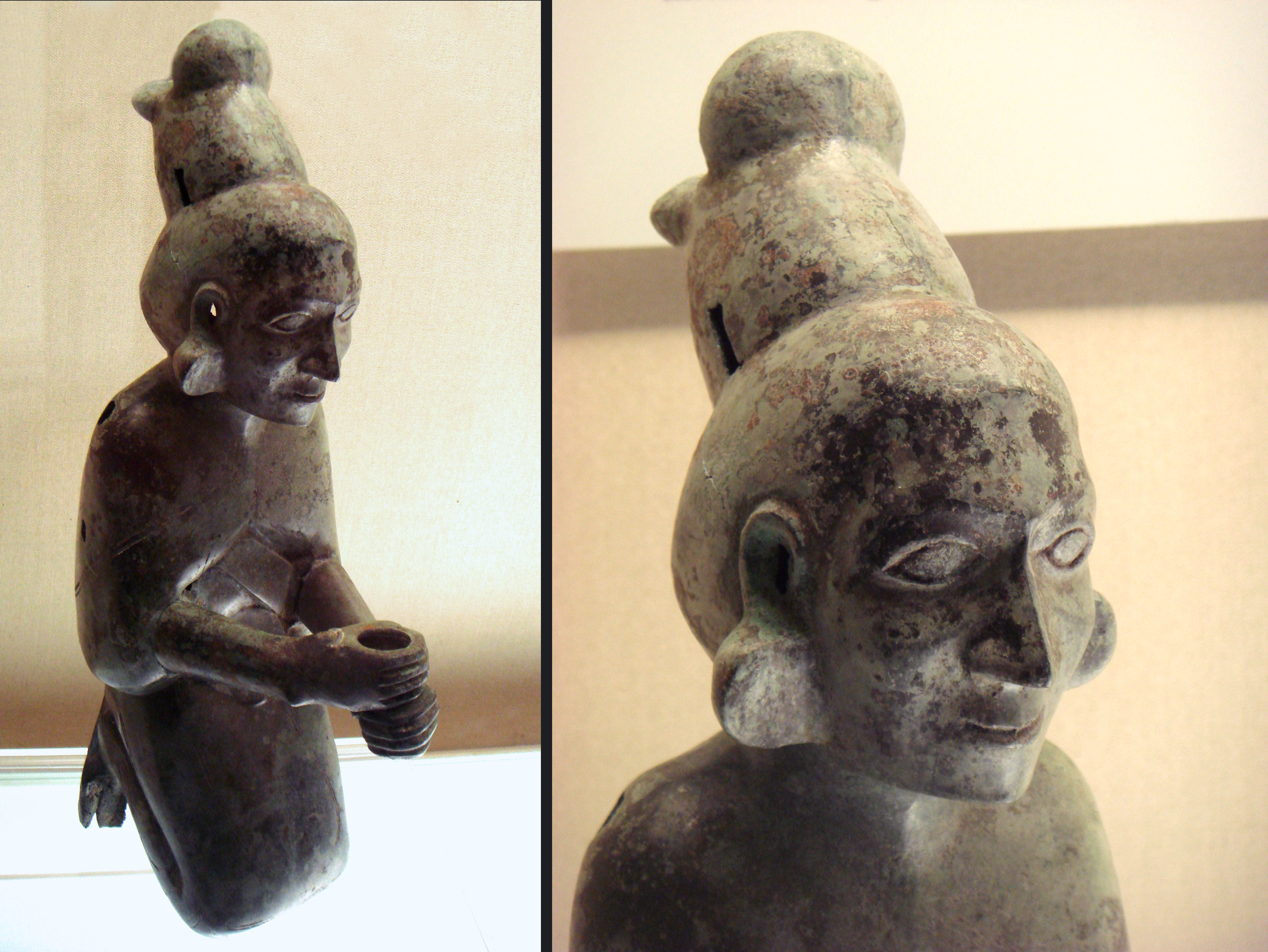
Dian woman

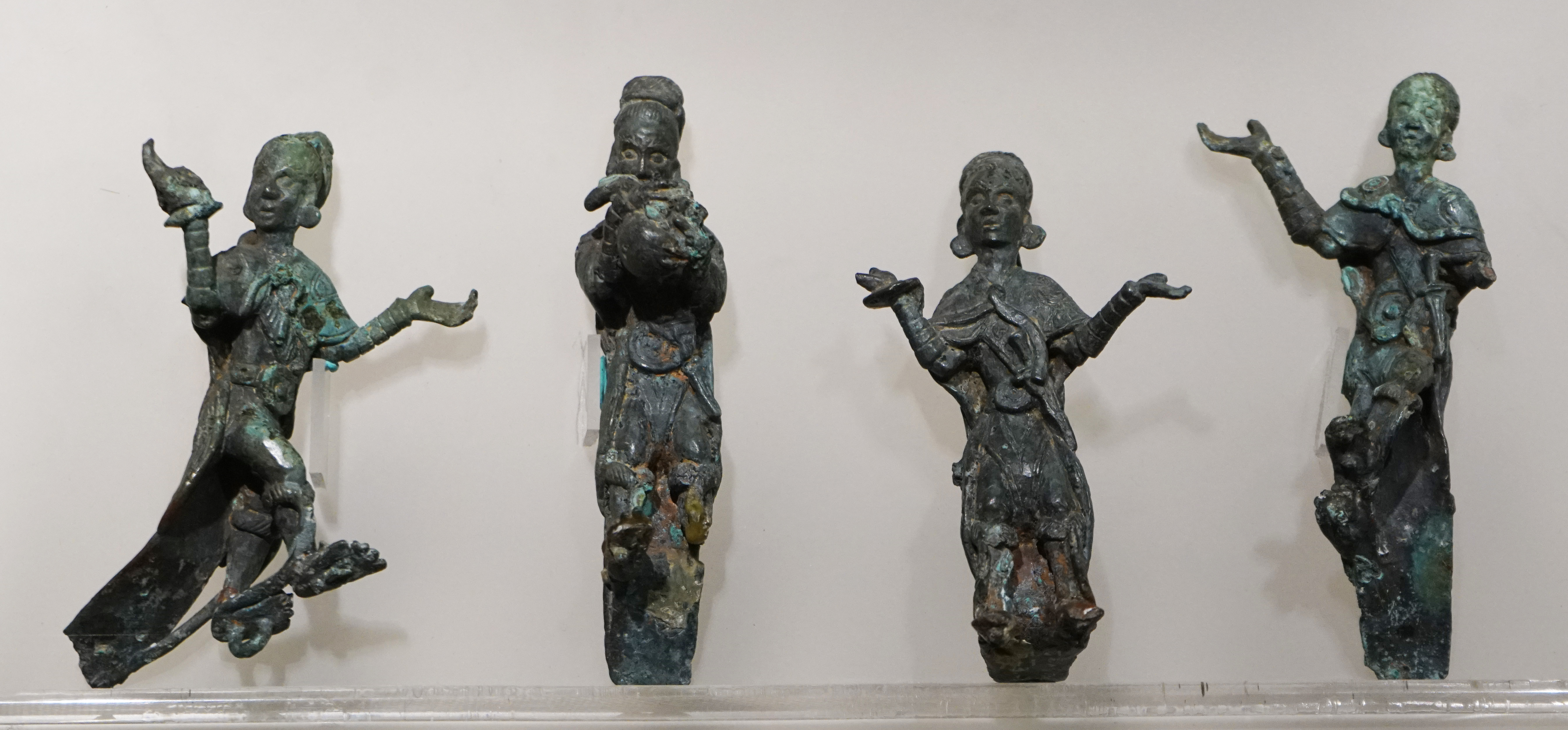
Dian female musicians and dancers

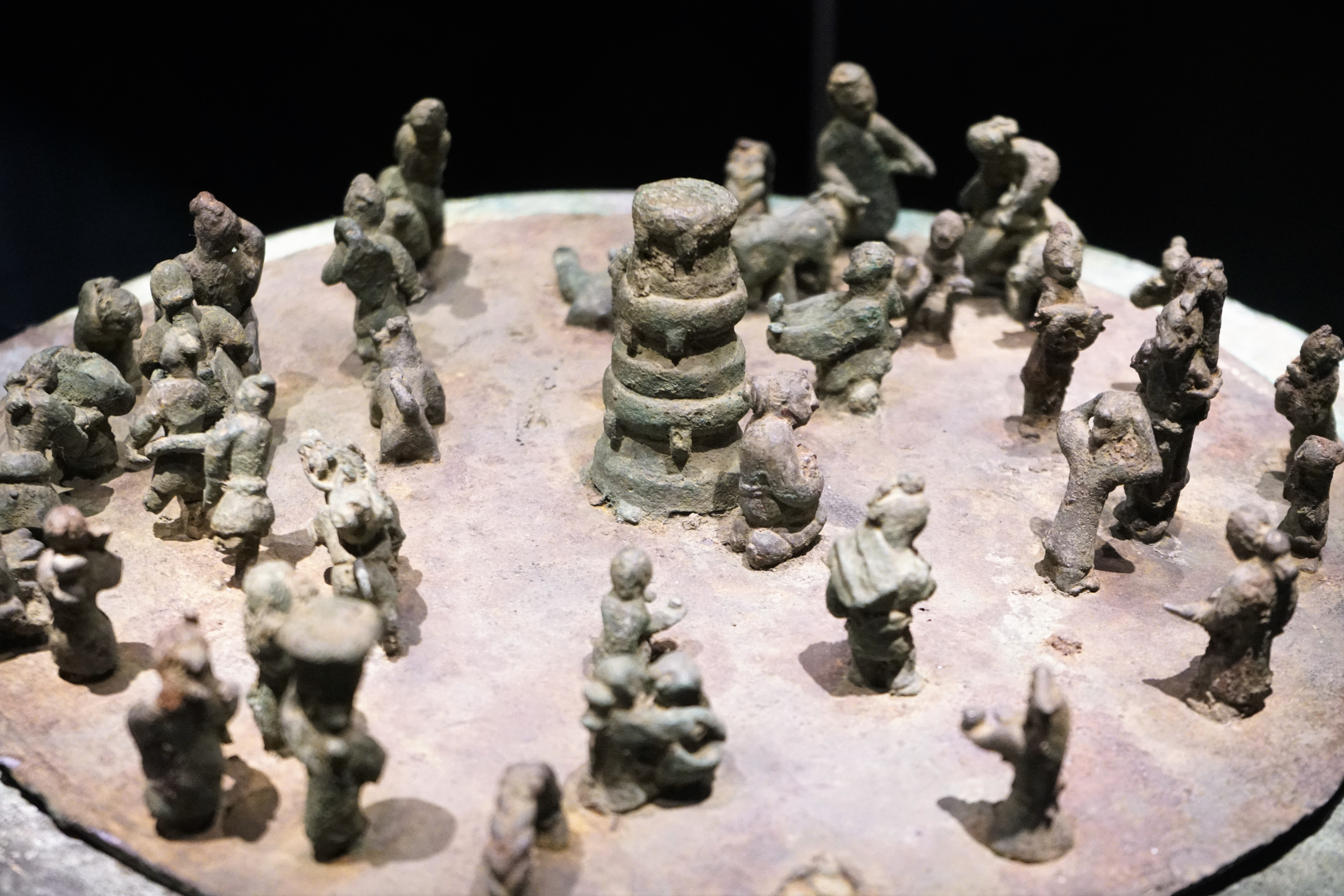
Dian bronze lid depicting a human sacrifice

=== Underwater ruins ===
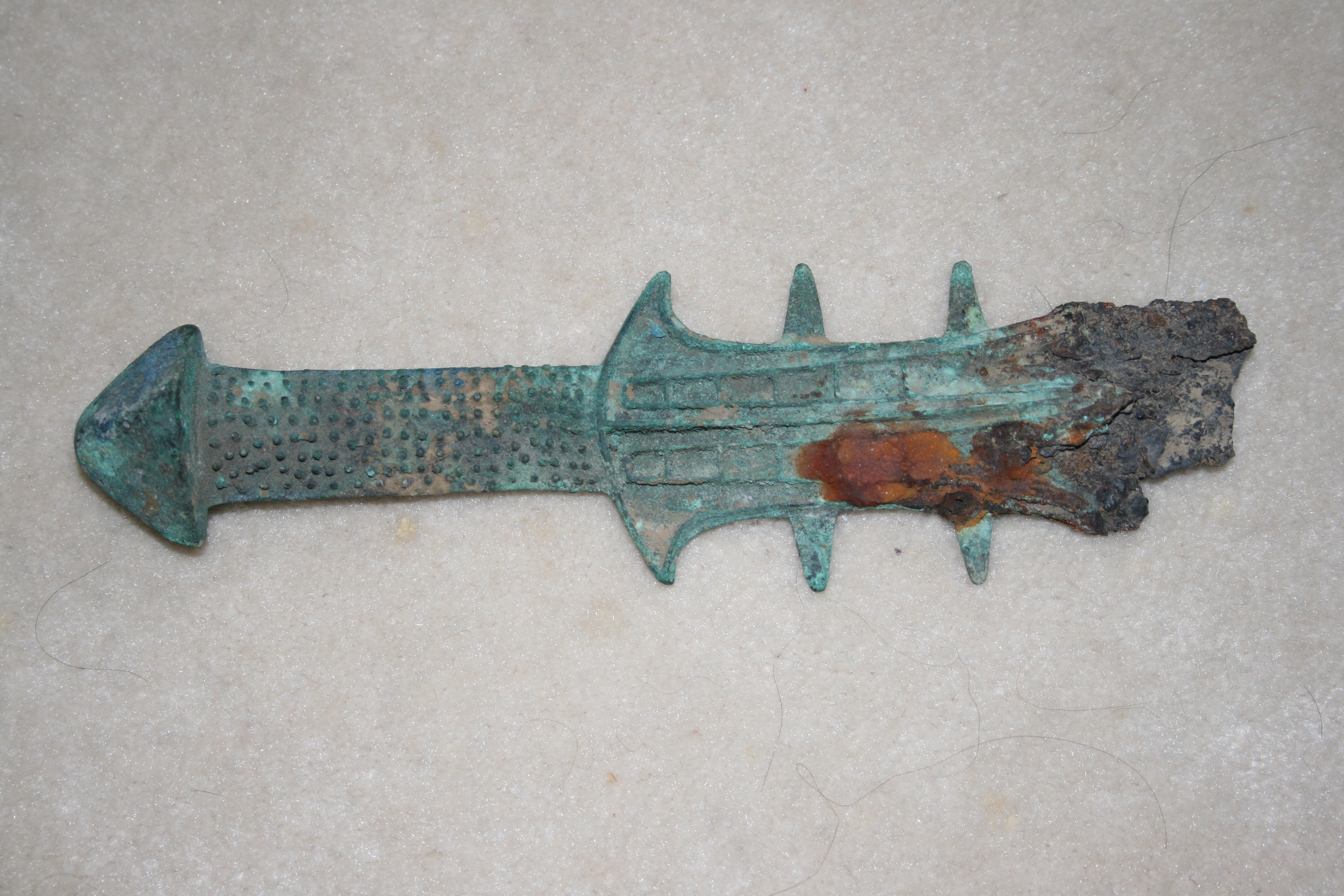
Bronze sword hilt from the Dian kingdom

Archaeologists recently discovered the inundated remains of Dian-period buildings and pottery fragments under Fuxian Lake and were able to verify their age with carbon dating.

=== Other artifacts ===
At Dabona, a site connected with the Dian culture, archaeologists discovered a large double coffin burial; The outer coffin was made of wood and the inner coffin was made of bronze. The inner coffin was shaped like a house and weighs over 157 kg.

The Yunnan Provincial Museum holds many archaeological relics of the Dian culture.

== Gallery ==
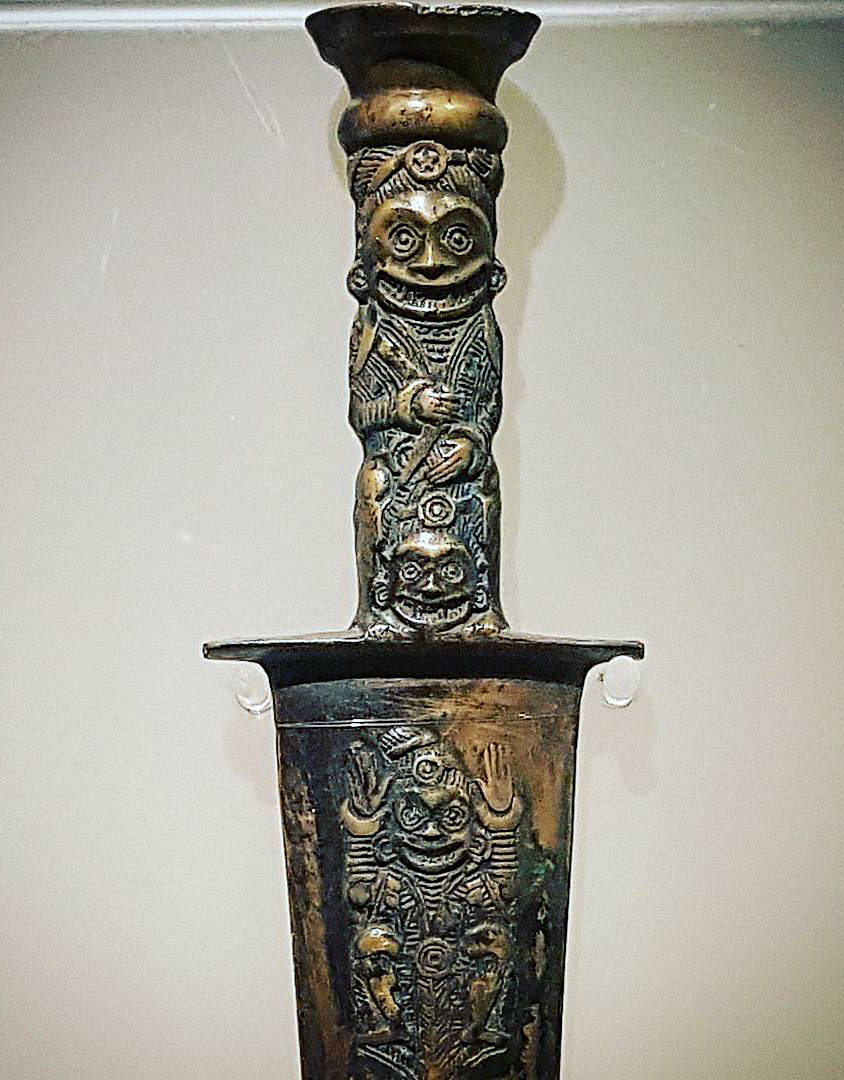
Bronze sword with a head-hunting theme from the Dian culture of ancient Yunnan (circa 100 BC) unearthed at Jiancheng and displayed at Yunnan Provincial Museum, Guandu, Kunming, 2016.

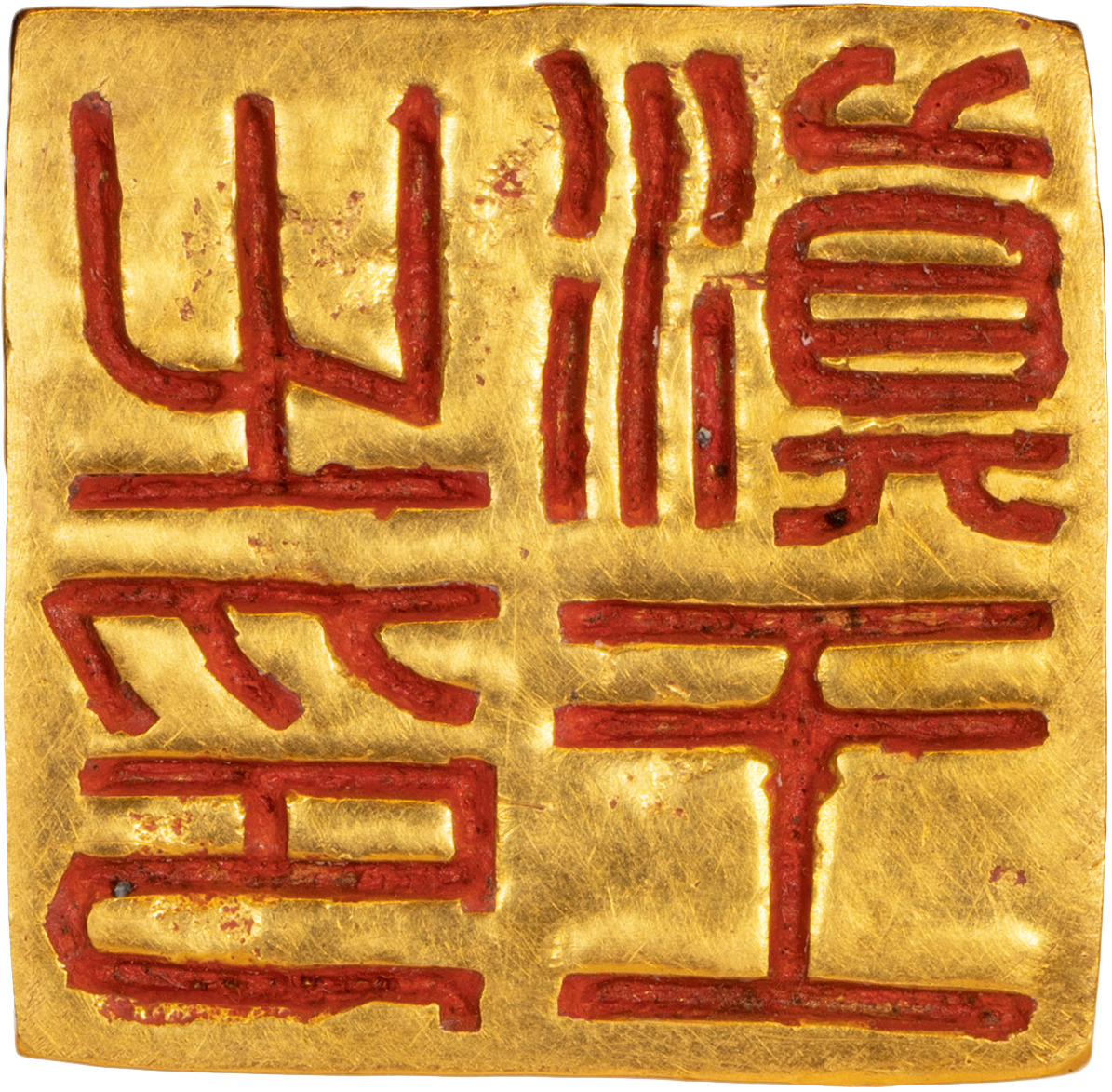
Seal of the kingdom of Dian

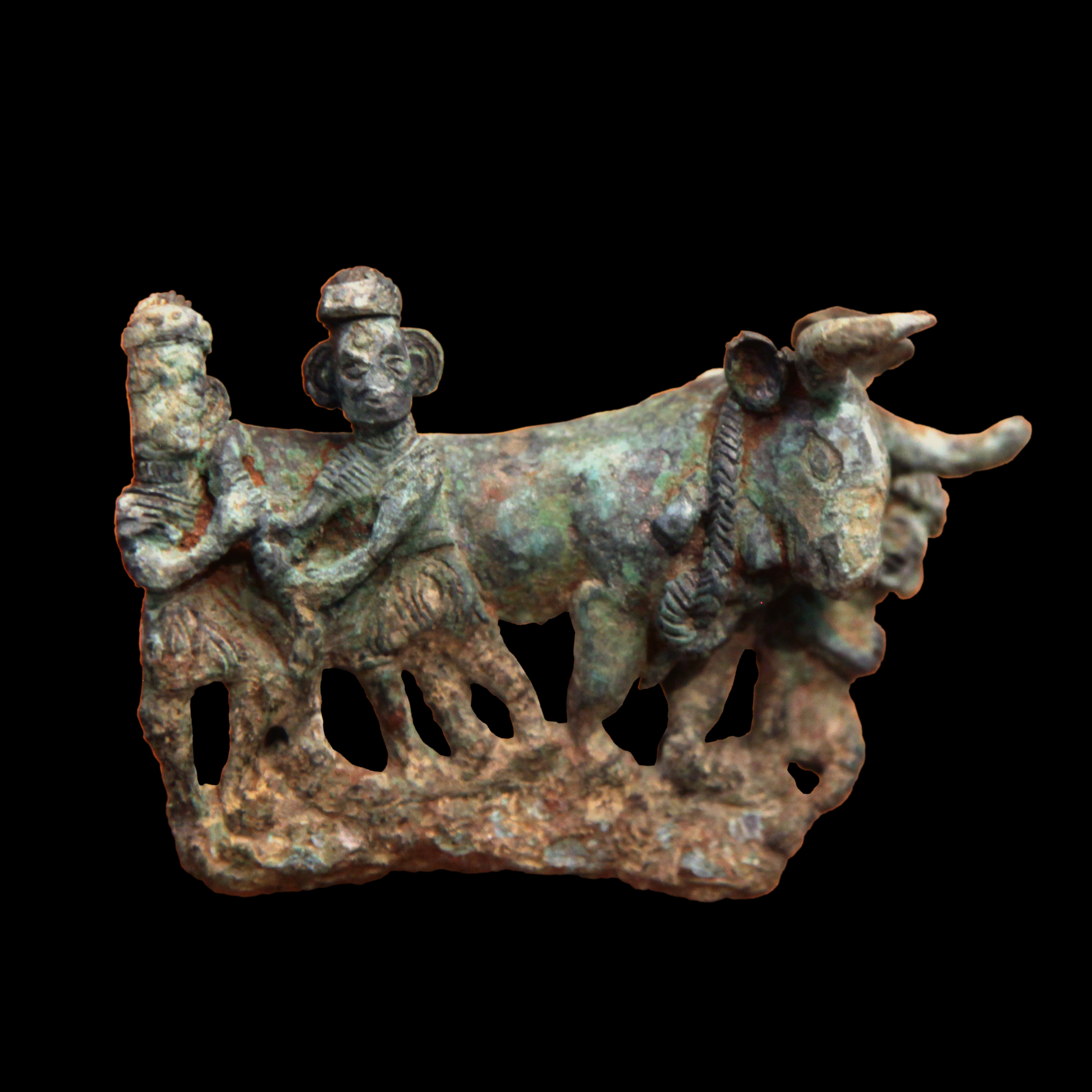
Dian people tending an ox

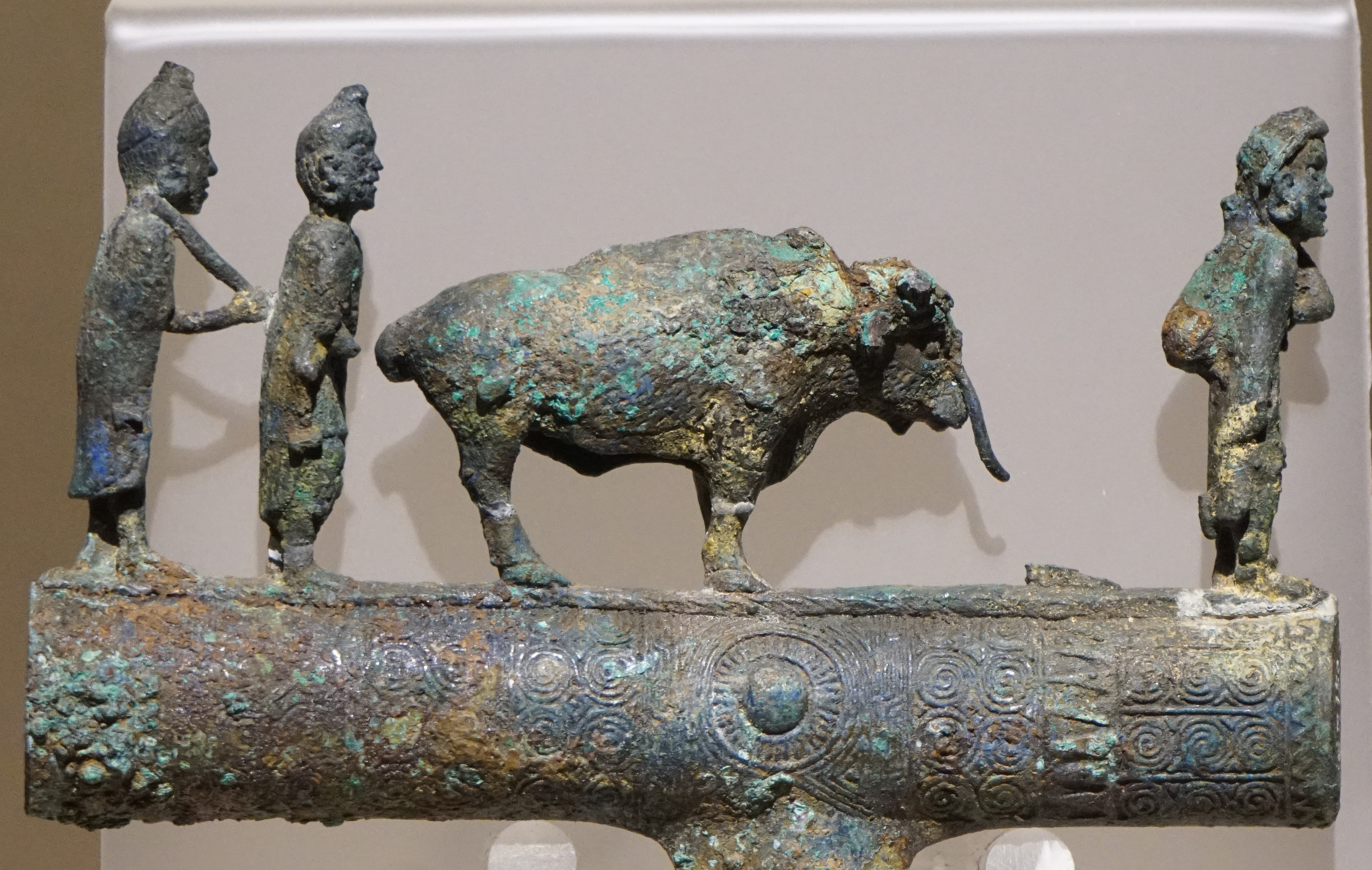
Dian people with an ox

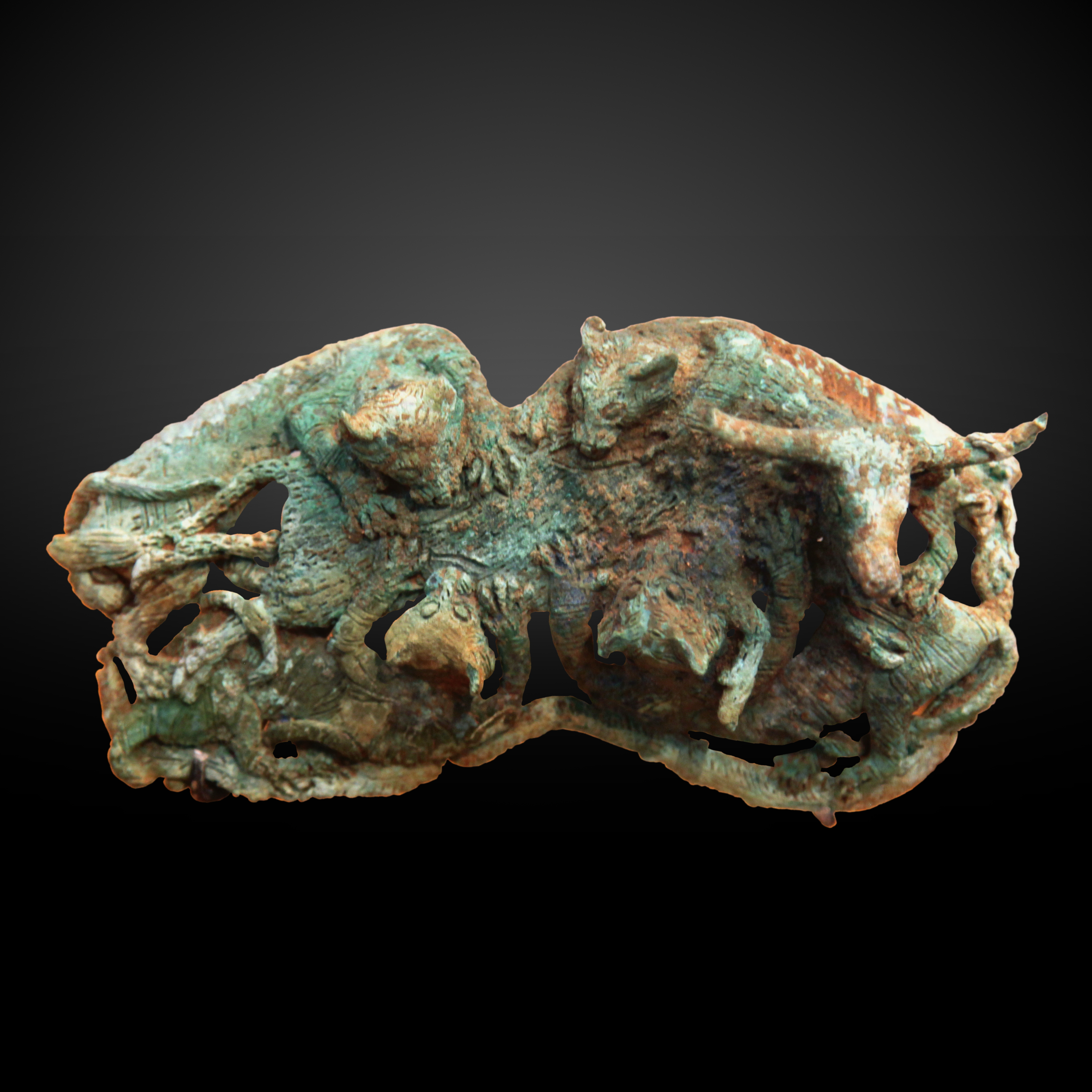
Bronze sculpture of the Dian kingdom (felines attacking an ox), 3rd century BC, Yunnan, China.

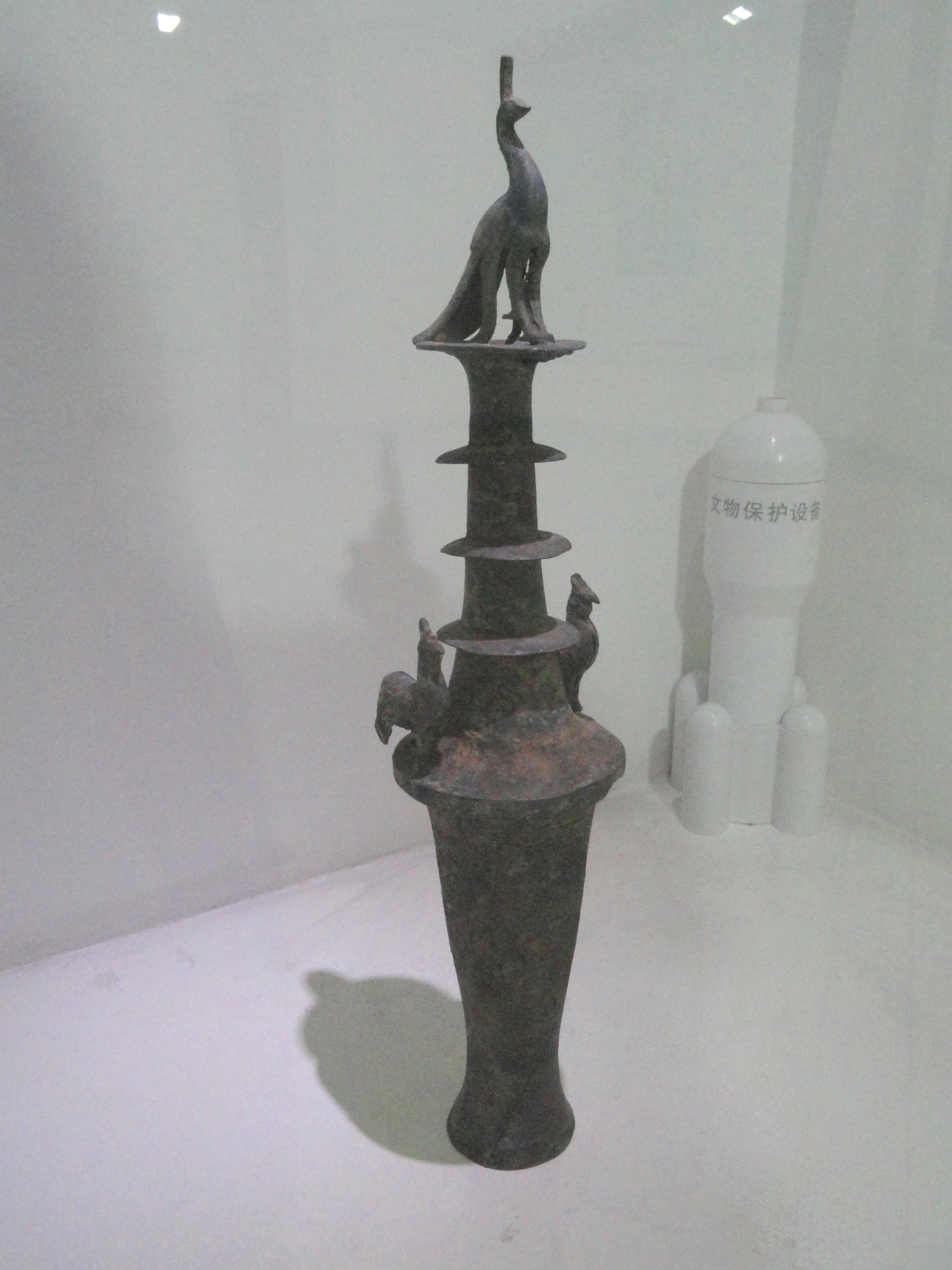
Dian wine cup

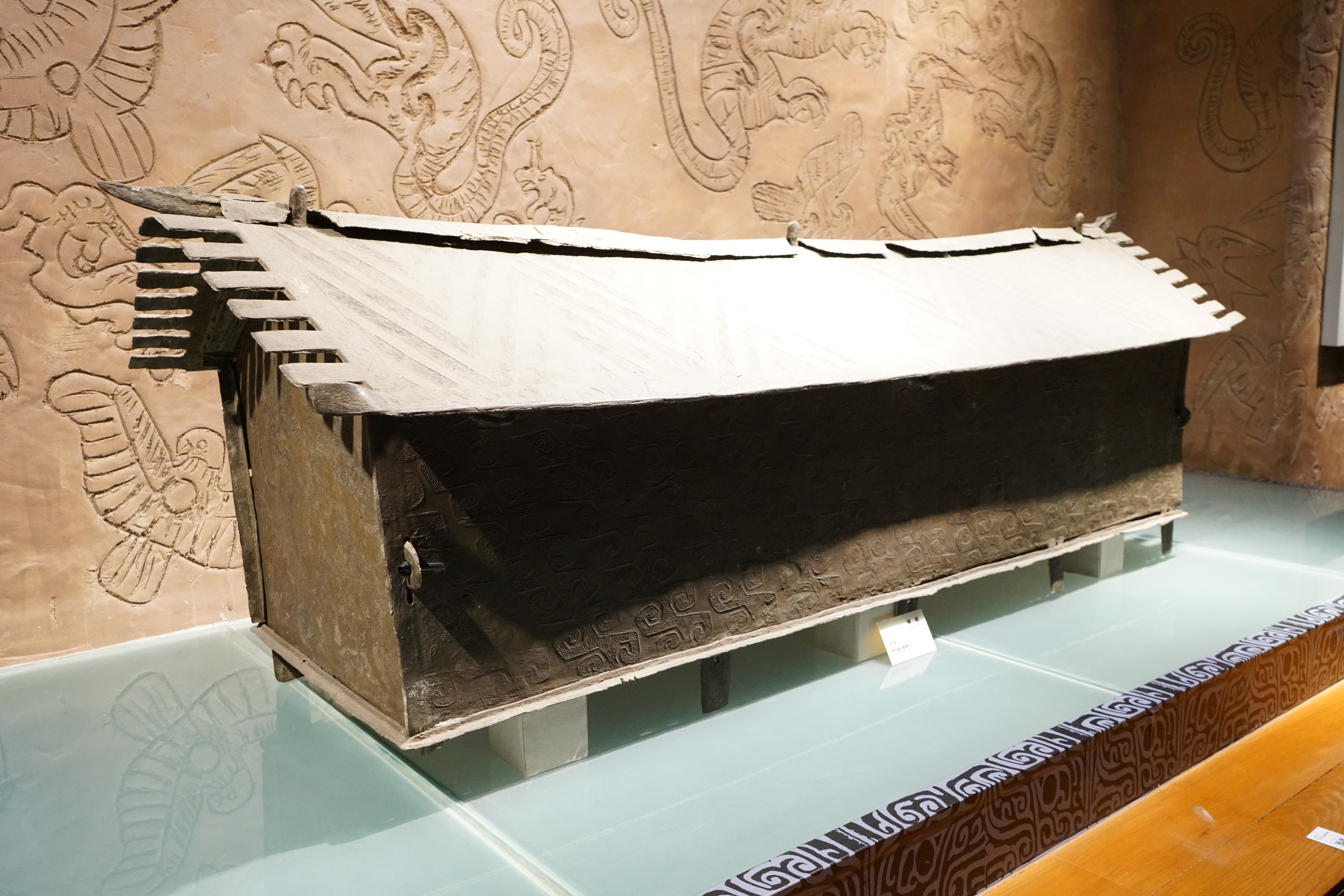
Dian bronze coffin in the shape of house
