= Kunming Metallurgy College =

College in Kunming, China

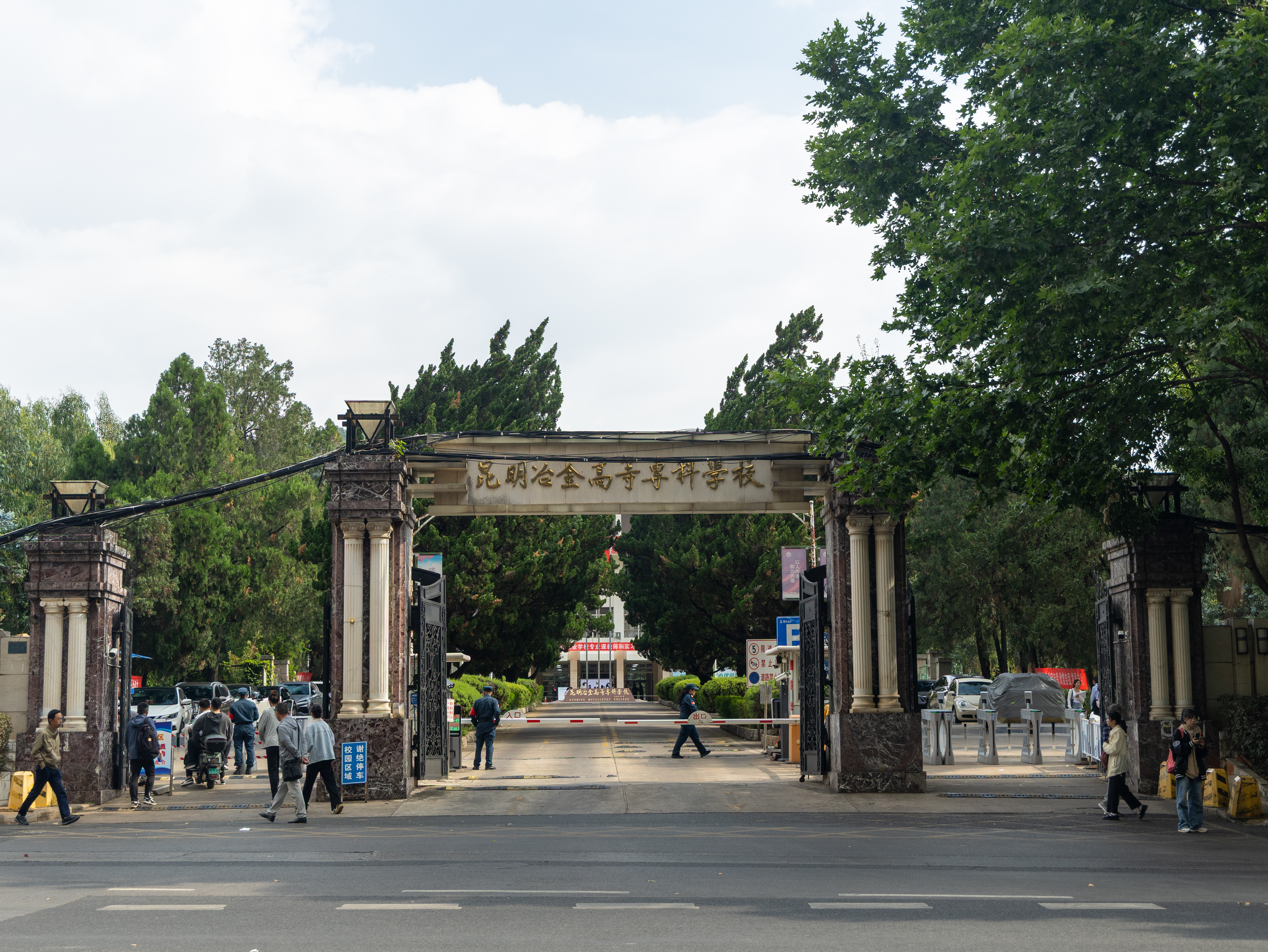
Kunming Metallurgy College

Kunming Metallurgy College (昆明冶金高等专科学校), located in Kunming, China, is a public general, full-time vocational college of higher education approved by the Ministry of Education.

The college was founded in 1952. During the 50 years since its establishment, the college has trained more than 50,000 qualified graduates for Yunnan Province and the country.

The college currently occupies an area of 317,755.14 square meters. The campus of the college is composed of three parts: the main part, the western part and the northern part. There are almost 10,000 undergraduates studying in the college, and more than 8,000 are full-time undergraduates.

Science is its main discipline followed by liberal arts, management, business and arts. There are 15 teaching departments and 49 higher vocational majors.
