= Yunnan =

Province in Southwest China

Yunnan 云南
- Province

Name transcription(s)
  - Chinese: 云南省 (Yúnnán Shěng)
  - Nuosu: ꒊꆈ or ꒊꆈꌜ (Yypnuo or Yypnuose)
  - Standard Zhuang: Yinznanz
  - Abbreviation: YN / 滇 (Diān) or 云 (Yún)
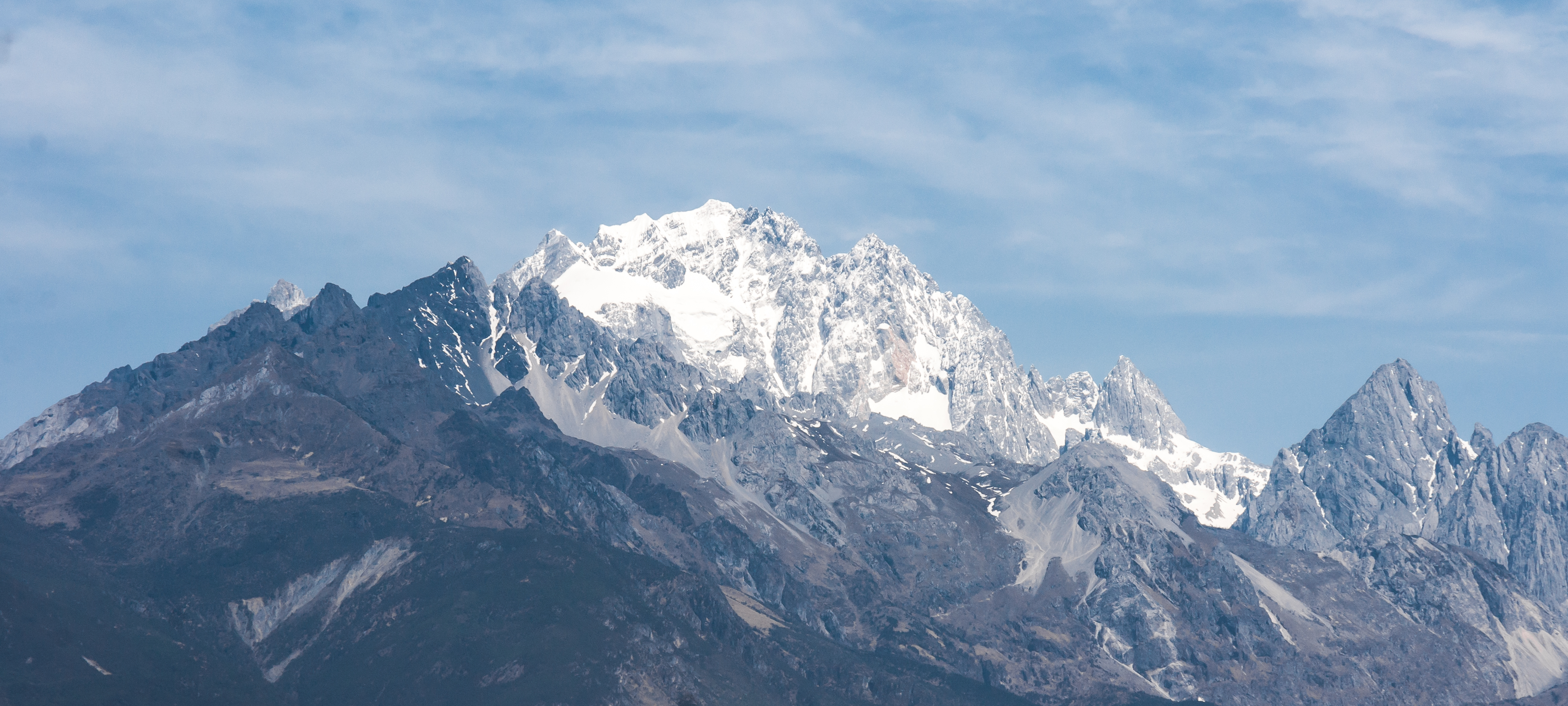
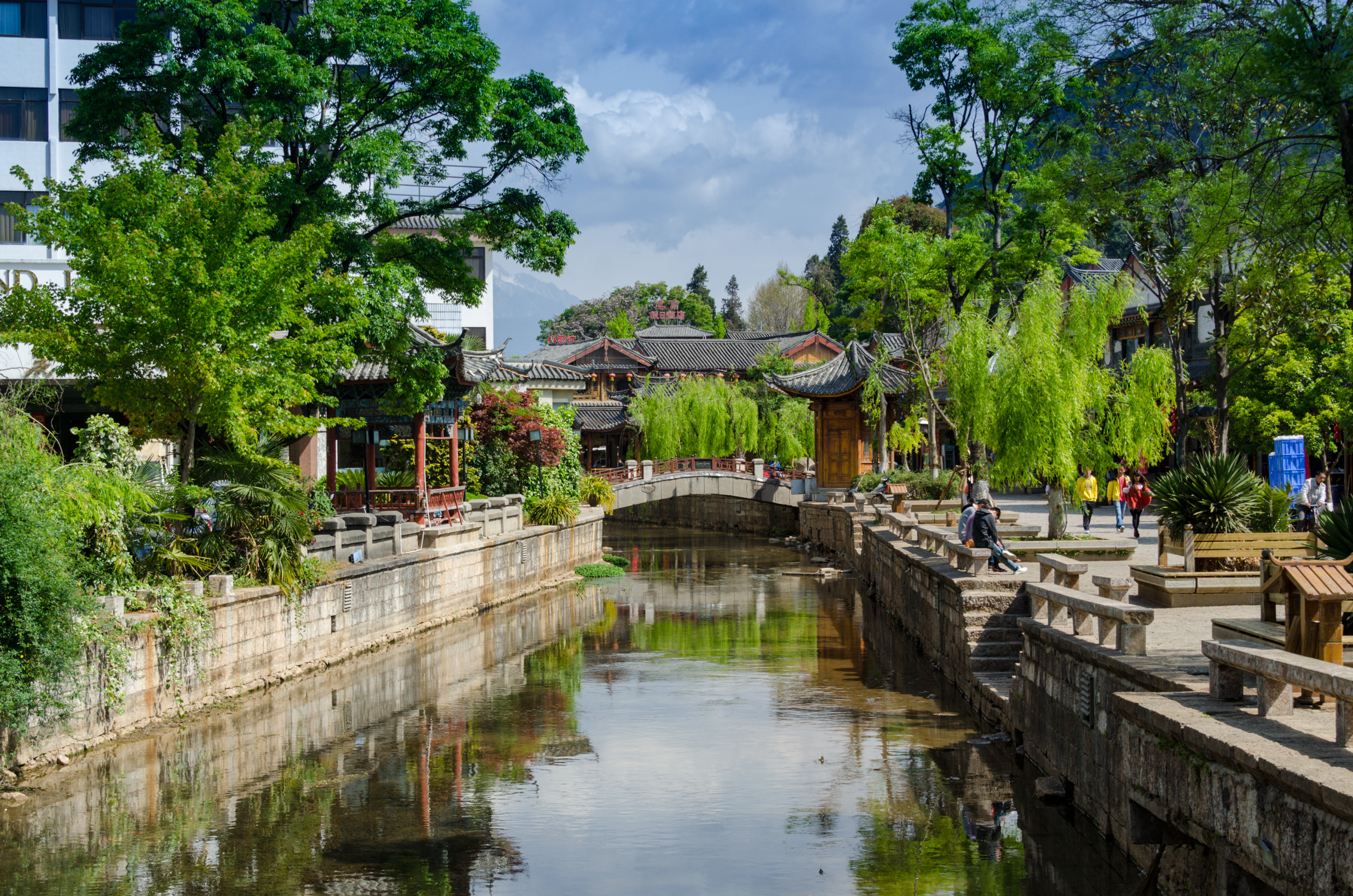
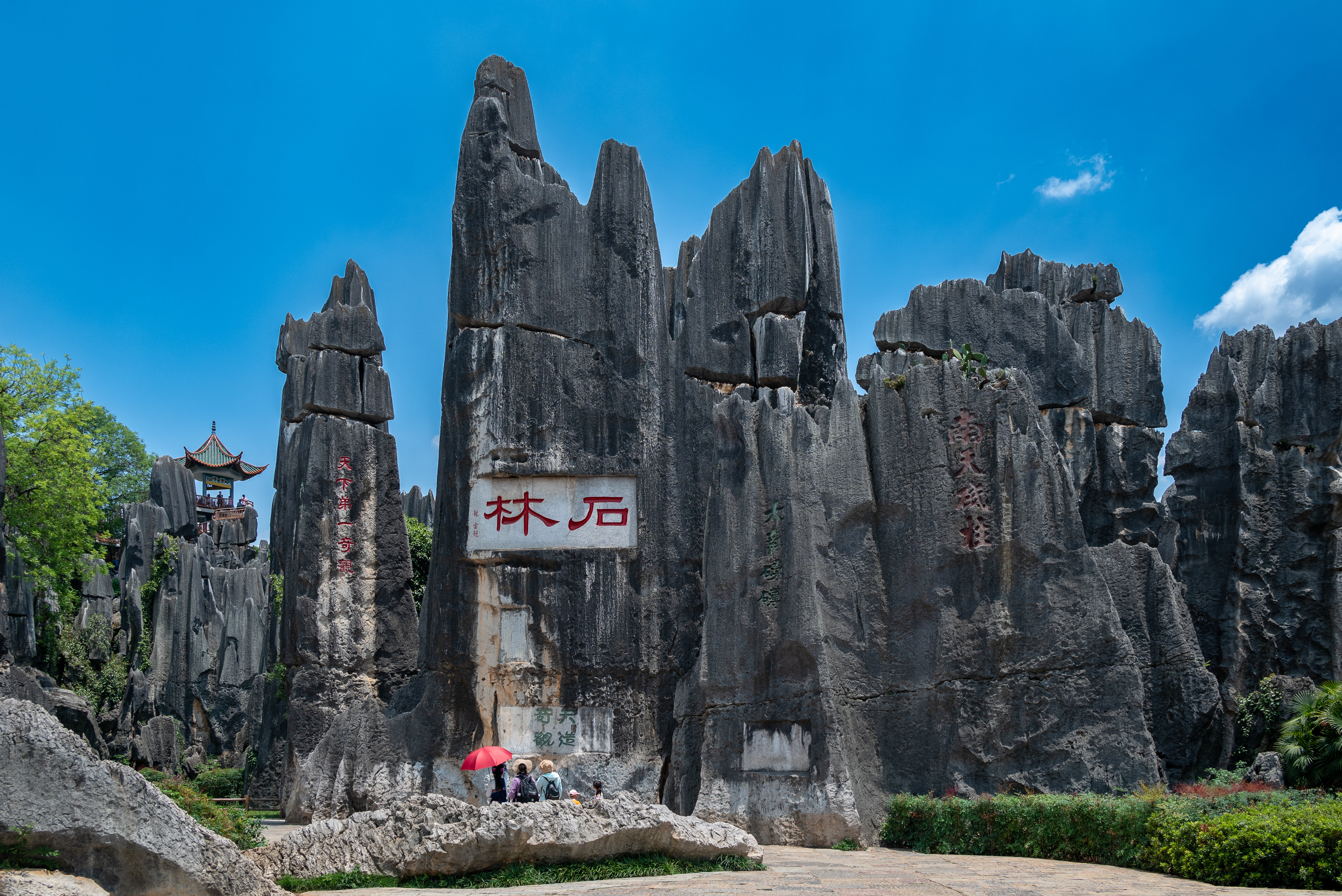
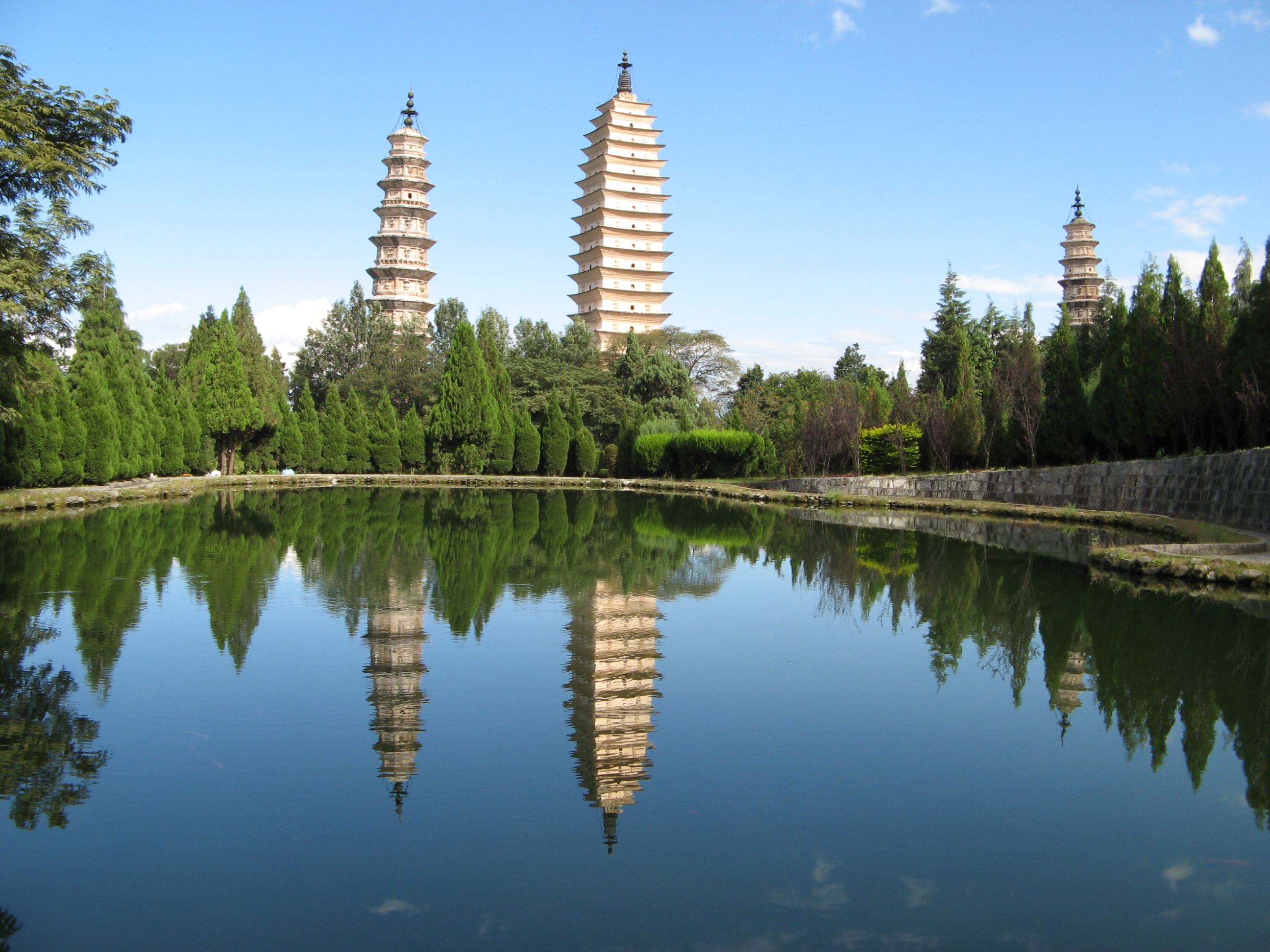
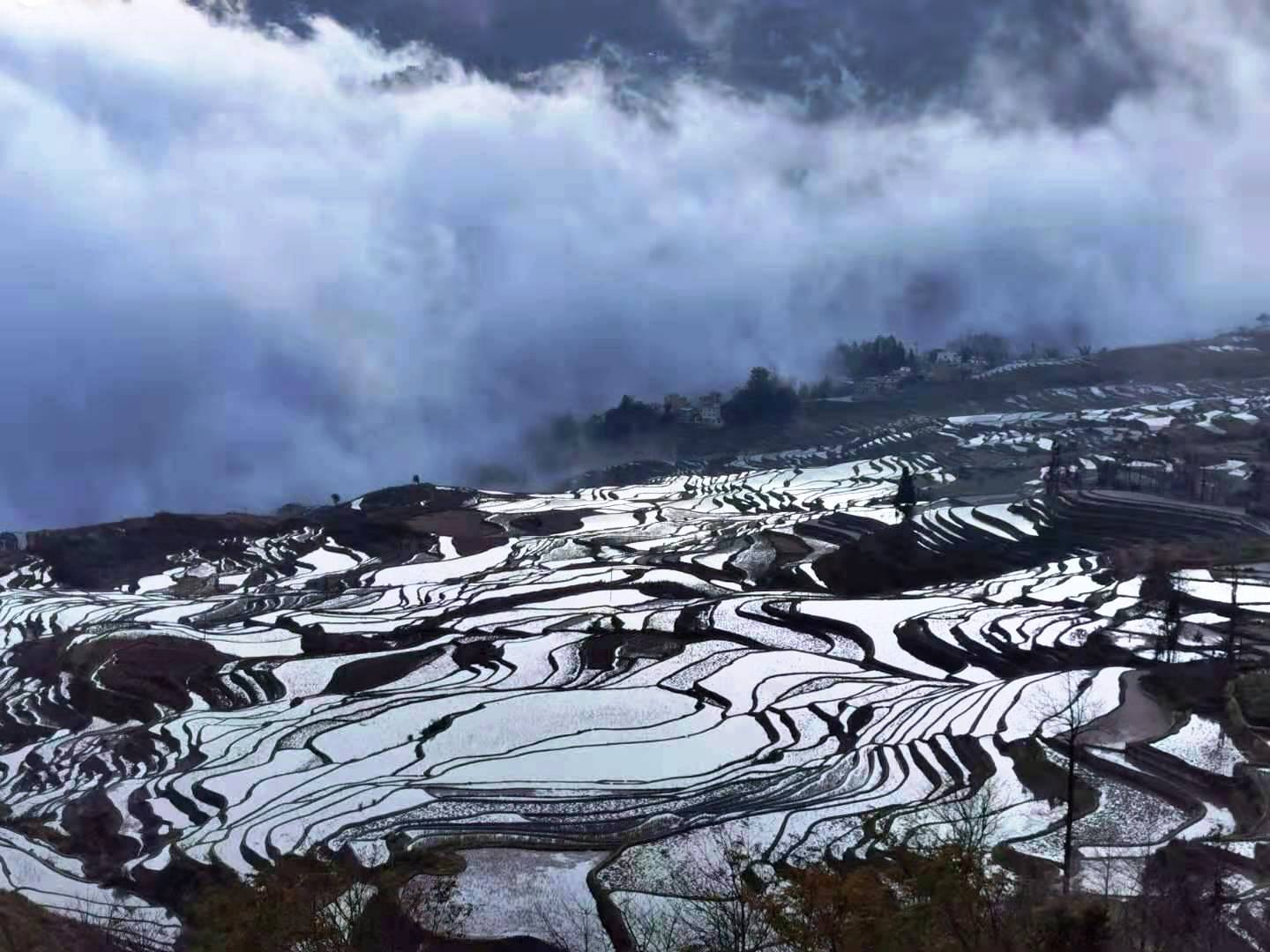
- Jade Dragon Snow Mountain Old Town of Lijiang Stone Forest The Three Pagodas of Dali City Honghe Hani Rice Terraces

- Location of Yunnan in China
- Coordinates: 25°02′58″N 102°42′32″E
- Country: China
- Kingdom of Nanzhao: 738
- Dachanghe: 902
- Ming conquest of Yunnan: 1381–1382
- Yunnan clique: 1915–1945
- Takeover by the People's Liberation Army: 1951
- Capital (and largest city): Kunming
- Divisions: 16 prefectures, 129 counties, 1565 townships

Government
  - Type: Province
  - Body: Yunnan Provincial People's Congress
  - Party Secretary: Mo Gaoyi
  - Congress chairman: Mo Gaoyi
  - Governor: Liu Qifan (Acting)
  - CPPCC chairman: Liu Xiaokai
  - National People's Congress Representation: 91 deputies

Area
  - Total: 394,000 km^{2} (152,000 sq mi)
  - Rank: 8th
- Highest elevation (Kawagarbo): 6,740 m (22,110 ft)

Population (2020)
  - Total: 47,209,277
  - Rank: 12th
  - Density: 120/km^{2} (310/sq mi)
  - Rank: 24th

Demographics
  - Ethnic groups: Han: 67%; Yi: 11%; Bai: 3.6%; Hani: 3.4%; Zhuang: 2.7%; Dai: 2.7%; Miao: 2.5%; Hui: 1.5%; Tibetan: 0.3%; De'ang: 0.19%
  - Languages and dialects: Southwestern Mandarin; 25 minority languages

GDP (2023)
  - Total: CN¥3,002 billion (US$426 billion; 18th)
  - Per capita: CN¥64,107 (US$9,097; 23rd)
- ISO 3166 code: CN-YN
- HDI (2023): 0.737 (27th) – high
- Website: www.yn.gov.cn

Yunnan
- "Yunnan" in simplified (top) and traditional (bottom) Chinese characters

Chinese name
- Simplified Chinese: 云南
- Traditional Chinese: 雲南
- Literal meaning: "South of the colorful clouds"（彩雲之南 / 彩云之南） (Note: This is a common interpretation of "Yunnan", but the original etymology is uncertain.)
Transcriptions
Standard Mandarin
- Hanyu Pinyin: Yúnnán
- Bopomofo: ㄩㄣˊ ㄋㄢˊ
- Gwoyeu Romatzyh: Yunnan
- Wade–Giles: Yün^{2}-nan^{2}
- IPA: [y̌n.nǎn]
Wu
- Romanization: Yiuin^{平}-noe^{平}
Hakka
- Romanization: Yùn-nàm
Yue: Cantonese
- Yale Romanization: Wàhn-nàahm
- Jyutping: Wan4-naam4
- IPA: [wɐn˩.nam˩]
Southern Min
- Hokkien POJ: Hûn-lâm

Yi name
- Yi: ꒊꆈ yyp nuo

Tai Lue name
- Tai Lue: ᦍᦲᧃᧉᦓᦱᧃᧉ jin naan

Lisu name
- Lisu: ꓬꓱ-ꓠ ye na

Tibetan name
- Tibetan: ཡུན་ནན་ yun nan

Northern Thai name
- Northern Thai: ᩅᩥᩮᨵᩉᩁᩣ᩠ᨩ; Witheharat

Thai name
- Thai: ยูนนาน; Yunnan

Vietnamese name
- Vietnamese: Vân Nam 雲南

Lao name
- Lao: ຢຸນນານ yun nān

Burmese name
- Burmese: ယူနန်ပြည်နယ် yunanpranynai

Shan name
- Shan: ယူႇၼၢၼ်ႇ၊ မိူင်း yū⸒nān⸒, möṅː

Yunnan (Note: UK: /juːˈnæn/, US: /ˌjuːˈnɑːn/; simplified Chinese: 云南; traditional Chinese: 雲南; pinyin: Yúnnán; Zhuyin Fuhao: ㄩㄣˊ ㄋㄢˊ; Mandarin pronunciation: [y̌nnǎn]; Burmese: ယူနန်; Lao: ຢຸນນານ; Vietnamese: Vân Nam) is an inland province in Southwestern China, spanning approximately 394,000 km^{2} (152,000 sq mi) and has a population of 47.2 million (as of 2020). The capital of the province is Kunming. The province borders the Chinese provinces of Guizhou, Sichuan, autonomous regions of Guangxi and Tibet, as well as Southeast Asian countries Myanmar (Burma), Vietnam, and Laos. Yunnan is China's fourth least developed province based on disposable income per capita in 2014.

Yunnan is situated in a mountainous area, with high elevations in the Northwest and low elevations in the Southeast. Most of the population lives in the eastern part of the province. In the west, the altitude can vary from the mountain peaks to river valleys as much as 3,000 m (9,800 ft). Yunnan is rich in natural resources and has the largest diversity of plant life in China. Of the approximately 30,000 species of vascular plants in China, Yunnan has perhaps 17,000 or more. Yunnan's reserves of aluminium, lead, zinc and tin are the largest in China, and there are also major reserves of copper and nickel. Historically, the southwestern Silk Road to Bhitargarh in Bangladesh passed through modern Yunnan.

Parts of Yunnan formed the Dian Kingdom during the 3rd and 2nd centuries BC. The Han dynasty conquered the Dian Kingdom in the late 2nd century BC, establishing the Yizhou Commandery in its place. During the chaos of the Three Kingdoms period, imperial Chinese authority in Yunnan weakened, and much of the region came under the control of the Cuanman. The area was later ruled by the Sino-Tibetan-speaking kingdom of Nanzhao from (738–937), followed by the Bai-ruled Dali Kingdom (937–1253). After the Mongol conquest of the region in the 13th century, Yunnan was conquered and ruled by the Ming dynasty.

From the Yuan dynasty onward, the area was part of a central government-sponsored population movement towards the southwestern frontier, with two major waves of migrants arriving from Han-majority areas in northern and southeast China. As with other parts of southwestern China, the Japanese occupation in the north during World War II forced another migration of Han people into the region. The two waves of migration contributed to Yunnan being one of the most ethnically diverse provinces of China, with ethnic minorities accounting for about 34 percent of its total population. Major ethnic groups include Yi, Bai, Hani, Zhuang, Dai, and Miao. Yunnan has also been identified as the birthplace of tea, and as the region of origin of the plant genus Cannabis.

== Etymology ==
The name "Yunnan" first referred to a place when the Han dynasty created Yunnan County near modern Xiangyun. During the Tang dynasty, Emperor Xuanzong gave Piluoge, the chief of Nanzhao, the title of "King of Yunnan" because Nanzhao originated from Yunnan County. Gradually the king of Yunnan controlled more and more territory, and "Yunnan" became the common name of the area. Therefore, the Yuan dynasty created the province of Yunnan after it occupied the Dali Kingdom.

Han dynasty literature did not record the etymology of "Yunnan," and there are many theories about its origin. One common theory states that the name means "south of colorful clouds" (彩云之南; cǎiyún zhī nán). That is supported by some annals in the Ming dynasty such as Dian Lüe (滇略) and Yunnan General Annals (云南通志). However, the modern historian Tan Qixiang considers that theory to be a superficial explanation of the literal meaning.

Another common theory is that the name means "south of Yun Range" (云岭之南) However, that has been disproven because the name "Yunling Mountains" first appeared in the Tang dynasty (618–907) literature although the name "Yunnan" first appeared during the Han dynasty (202 BC – 220 AD).

Modern research gives more conjectures. You Zhong considered "Yunnan" to mean "south of the mountain [referring to the Cang Mountain] with clouds." Wu Guangfan considered that "Yunnan" might be a Loloish or a Bai name.

== History ==
=== Prehistory ===
The Yuanmou Man, a Homo erectus fossil unearthed by railway engineers in the 1960s, has been determined to be the oldest-known hominid fossil in China, dating back to an estimated 1.7 million years ago. By the Neolithic period, there were human settlements in the area of Lake Dian. The people used stone tools and constructed simple wooden structures.

=== Dian Kingdom ===
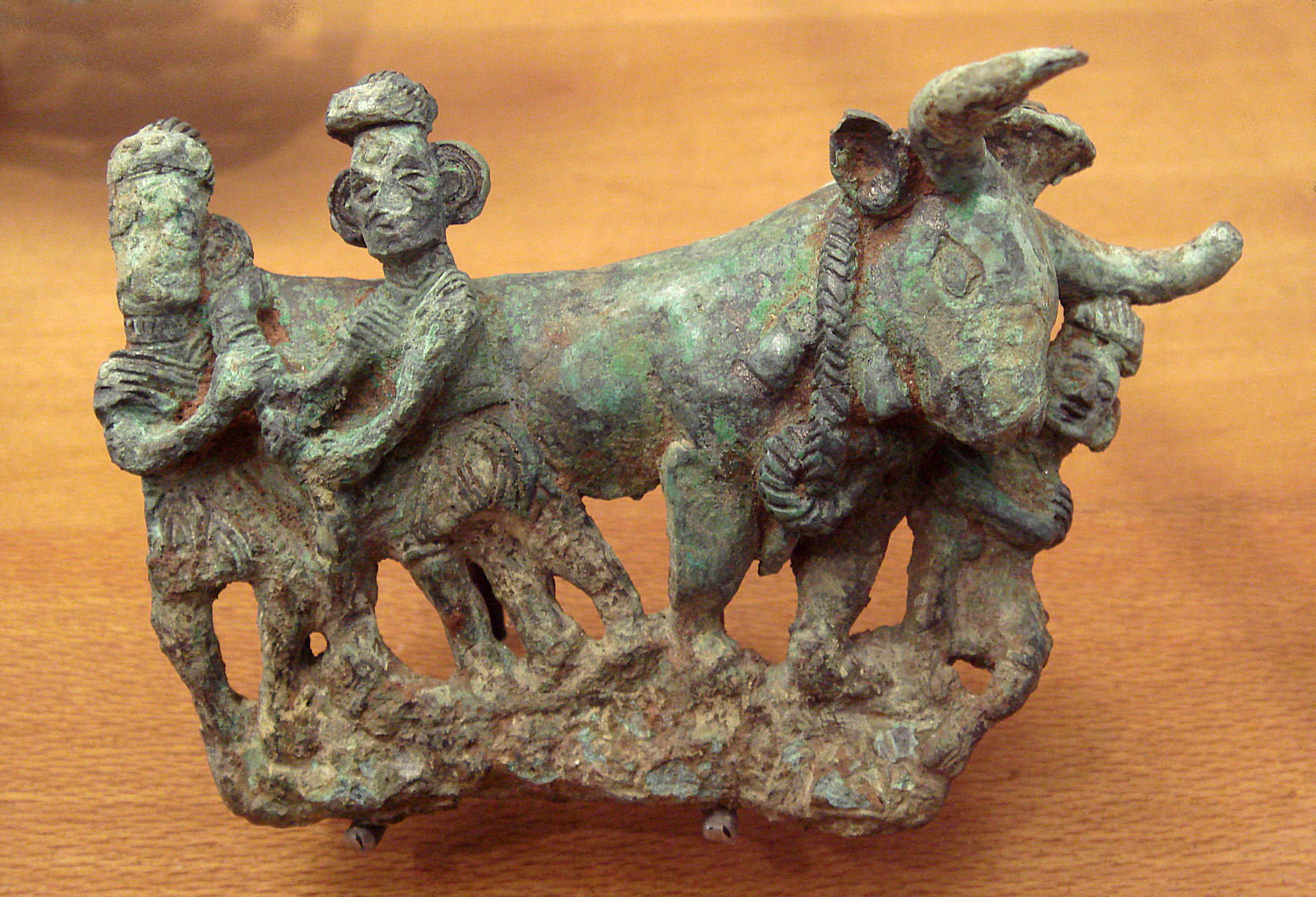
Bronze sculpture of the Dian Kingdom, 3rd century BC

Around the 3rd century BC, the central area of Yunnan around present day Kunming was known as Dian. The Chu general Zhuang Qiao (庄蹻) entered the region from the upper Yangtze River and set himself up as "King of Dian." He and his followers brought into Yunnan an influx of Chinese influence, the start of a long history of migration and cultural expansion.

=== Qin and Han dynasties ===
In 221 BC, Qin Shi Huang unified China and extended his authority south. Commanderies and counties were established in Yunnan. An existing road in Sichuan – the "Five Foot Way" – was extended south to around present day Qujing, in eastern Yunnan. In 109 BC, the Han dynasty conquered Dian during its southern expeditions. Under orders from Emperor Wu, General Guo Chang (郭昌) was sent south to Yunnan, eventually establishing the Yizhou commandery. By then, agricultural technology in Yunnan had improved markedly. The local people used bronze tools, plows and kept a variety of livestock, including cattle, horses, sheep, goats, pigs and dogs. Anthropologists have determined that the people were related to the people who are now known as the Tai. They lived in tribal congregations, which were sometimes led by exiled Chinese.

During the Three Kingdoms, the territory of present-day Yunnan, western Guizhou and southern Sichuan was collectively called Nanzhong. The dissolution of Chinese central authority led to increased autonomy for Yunnan and more power for the local tribal structures. In AD 225, the famed statesman Zhuge Liang led three columns into Yunnan to pacify the tribes. His seven captures of Meng Huo, a local magnate, is mythologized in the Romance of the Three Kingdoms.

=== Cuan Kingdom ===
In the 4th century, northern China was largely overrun by nomadic tribes from the north. In the 320s, the Cuan (爨) clan migrated into Yunnan. Cuan Chen (爨琛) named himself king and held authority from Lake Dian, then known as Kunchuan. Henceforth the Cuan clan ruled eastern Yunnan for over four hundred years.

International trade flowed through Yunnan. An ancient overland pre-Tang trade route from Yunnan passed through Irrawaddy in Burma to reach Bengal. Yunnan was inhabited by so-called barbarians not fully under the control of the Tang government and the route, though ancient, was not used much in pre-Tang times, and Chinese attempts to control the route were disrupted by the rise of Nanzhao.

=== Nanzhao period ===
Yunnan was settled by several local tribes, clans, and cultures before the 8th century. Around Lake Erhai, namely, the Dali area, there emerged six zhao: Mengzi (蒙巂), Yuexi (越析), Langqiong (浪穹), Dengdan (邆赕), Shilling (施浪), and Mengshe (蒙舍). Zhao (诏) was an indigenous non-Chinese language term meaning "king" or "kingdom." Among the six regimes Mengshe was located south of the other five; therefore given the new, larger context, it was called Nanzhao (Southern Kingdom).

By the 730s Nanzhao had succeeded in bringing the Erhai Lake–area under its authority. In 738, the western Yunnan was united by Piluoge, the fourth king of Nanzhao, who was confirmed by the imperial court of the Tang dynasty as king of Yunnan. Ruling from Dali, the thirteen kings of Nanzhao ruled over more than two centuries and played a vital role in the dynamic relationship between the Tang dynasty and the Tibetan Empire as a buffer state.

By the 750s, Nanzhao had conquered Yunnan and became a potential rival to Tang China. The following period saw several conflicts between Tang China and Nanzhao. In 750, Nanzhao attacked and captured Yaozhou, the largest Tang settlement in Yunnan. In 751, Xianyu Zhongtong (鮮于仲通), the regional commander of Jiannan (present-day Sichuan), led a Tang campaign against Nanzhao. The king of Nanzhao, Geluofeng, regarded the previous incident as a personal affair and wrote to Xianyu to seek peace. However, Xianyu Zhongtong detained the Nanzhao envoys and turned down the appeal. Confronted with Tang armies, Nanzhao immediately turned its allegiance to the Tibetan Empire. The Tubo and the Nanzhao agreed to be "fraternal states." Geluofeng was given the titles zanpuzhong ("younger brother"). The Nanzhao-Tubo alliance ensured a disastrous defeat for Xianyu's expedition, with the Tang general's army of 80,000 men being reduced to a quarter of its original size.

Tang China did not give up after one failure. In 753, another expedition was prepared, but it was also defeated by Nanzhao. In 754, the Tang organized an army of more than 100,000 troops that advanced to the Dali plain, resulting only in another slaughter. By the end of the eighth century, Tang was no longer a major threat to Nanzhao.

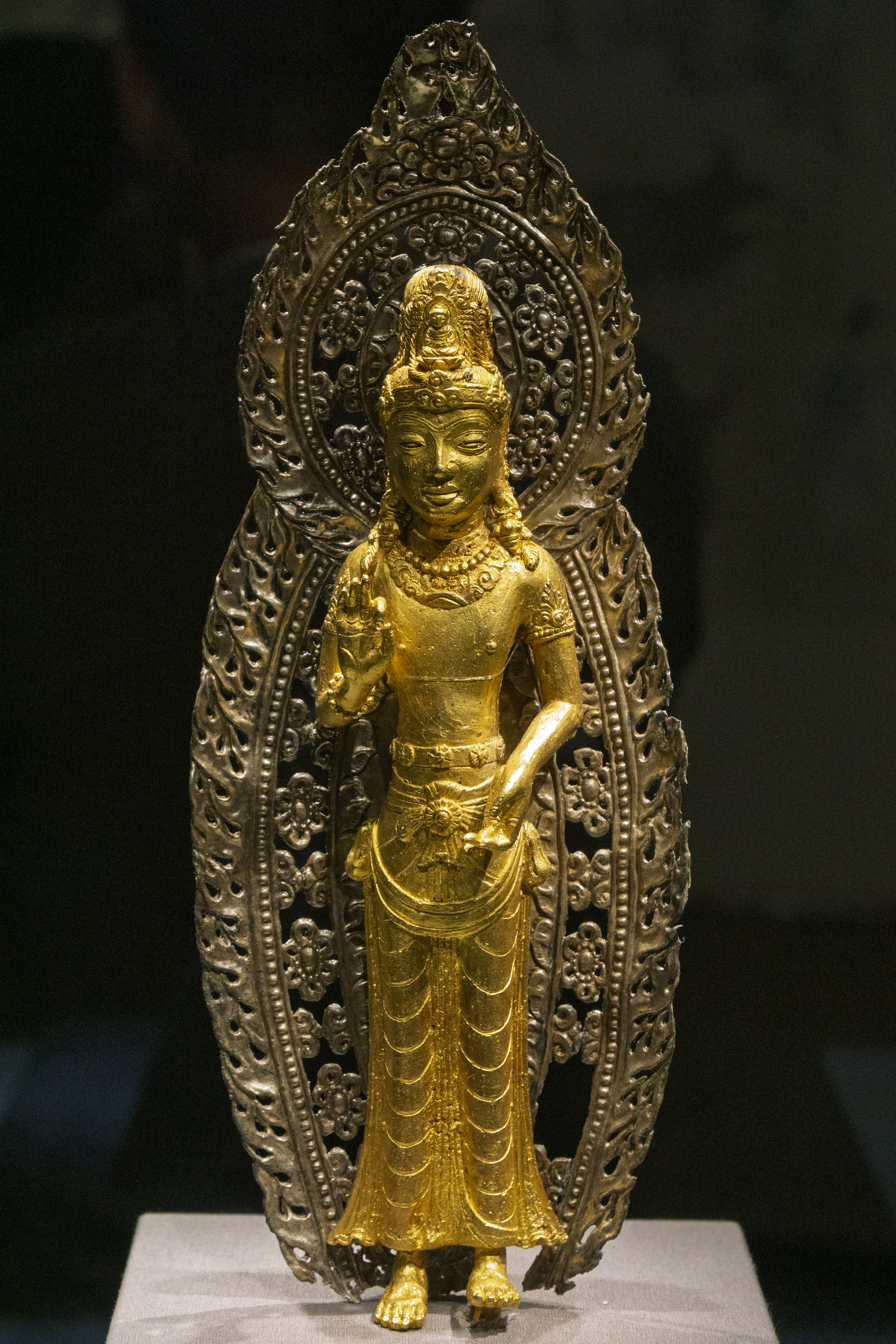
A gold statue of Acharya Lokeshvara (Guanyin), recovered from the Qianxun Pagoda, Dali Kingdom

Nanzhao's expansion lasted for several decades. In 829, Nanzhao suddenly plundered Sichuan and entered Chengdu. When it retreated, hundreds of Sichuan people, including skilled artisans, were taken to Yunnan. In 832, the Nanzhao army captured the capital of the Pyu kingdom in modern upper Burma. Nanzhao also attacked the Khmer peoples of Zhenla. Generally speaking, Nanzhao was then the most powerful kingdom in mainland Southeast Asia, and played an extremely active role in multistate interactions. In 859, Nanzhao captured Bozhou, an event that exacerbated the Nanzhao-Tang clashes. When the Tang governor of Annam took Bozhou back the following year, Nanzhao, with the help of native peoples, occupied Hanoi as the Tang army moved to Bozhou. When the Tang forces returned, Nanzhao troops retreated from Hanoi but attacked and plundered Yongzhou. In the winter of 862, Nanzhao, allying with local groups, led an army of over 50,000 men to invade Annam again. It is reported that the Tang forces lost over 150,000 soldiers (either killed or captured by Nanzhao) in the two Annam battles. The autumn of 866 saw Tang victory in Hanoi and soon all of the Nanzhao forces were driven away. But Tang China had lost its ability to attack Nanzhao.

While Nanzhao was being defeated in Annam, it still occasionally attacked Sichuan. In 869, Shilong (世隆), the eighth king and the first empire of Nanzhao, invaded Sichuan. In 874, Nanzhao attacked Sichuan again.

In 902, Zheng Maisi, the Qingpingguan (清平官,"Prime Minister") of Nanzhao, murdered the infant king of Nanzhao, and established a new kingdom called Dachanghe. Nanzhao, a once-powerful empire, disappeared. In 928, Yang Ganzhen (楊干貞) usurped the Dachanghe king and established Zhao Shanzheng, a qingpingguan as emperor of Datianxing (大天興). In 929, Yang Qianzhen abolished Zhao Shanzheng and established himself as Emperor of Dayining (大義寧).

=== Dali Kingdom and Yuan dynasty ===
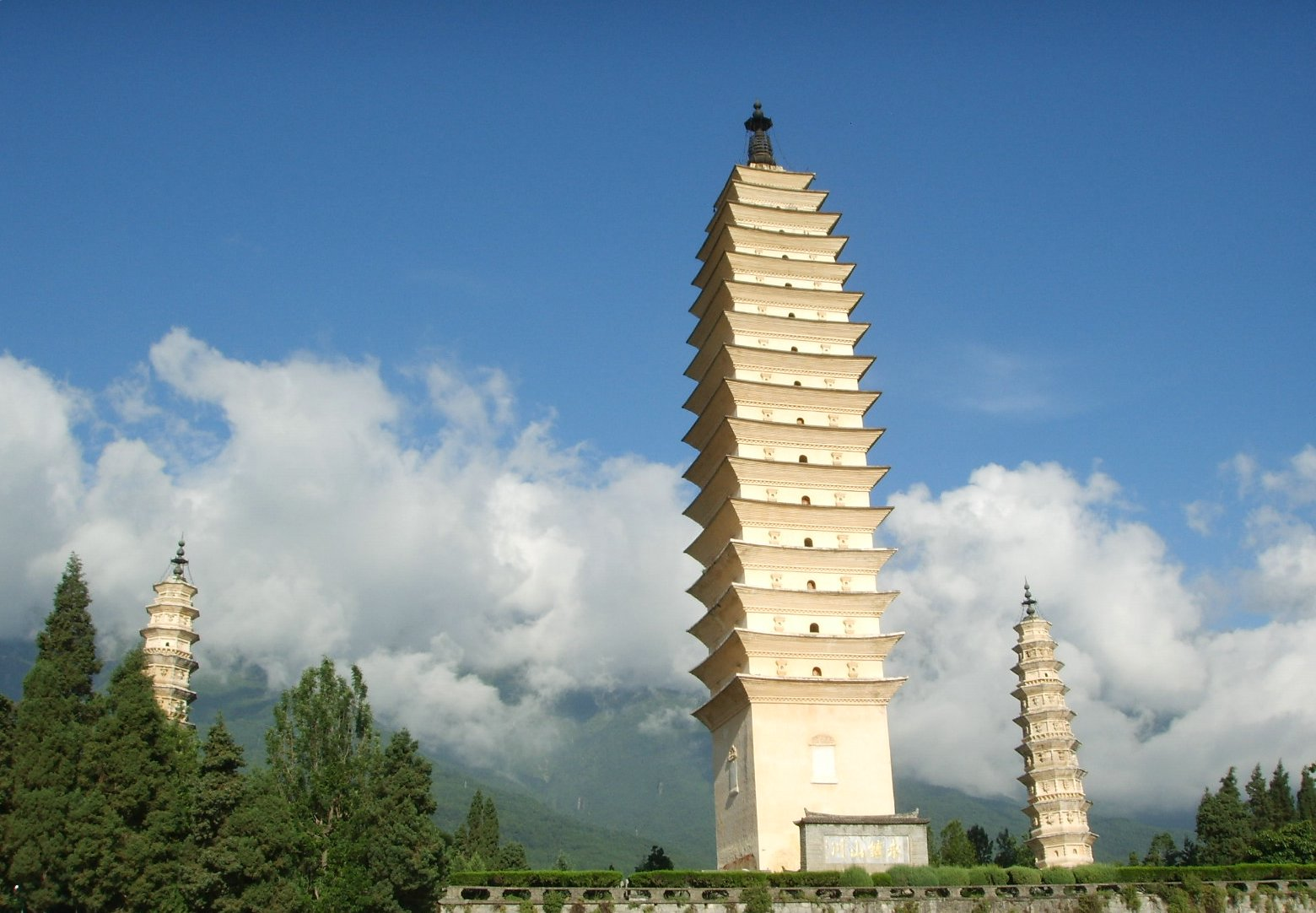
The Three Pagodas of Dali

In 937, Duan Siping overthrew the Dayining Kingdom and established the Dali Kingdom. The kingdom was conquered by the Mongol Empire in 1253 after Dali King Duan Xingzhi defected to the Mongols. The Duans were incorporated into the Mongol administration as Maharajas of the new province. The Mongolian prince sent to administer the region with them was killed. In 1273, Kublai Khan reformed the province and appointed the semu Ajall Shams al-Din Omar as its governor. During the Yuan dynasty, Yunnan included significant portions of Upper Burma after the First Mongol invasion of Burma in the 1270s and 1280s. The withdrawal of garrison troops from Burma in 1303 gave local leaders the freedom to expand their own power bases, eventually leading to the rapid rise and rebellion of Möng Mao in the 1340s. With the fall of the Yuan dynasty in 1368, the Ming dynasty destroyed the Yuan loyalists led by Basalawarmi and the remnants of the House of Duan in the Ming conquest of Yunnan by the early 1380s.

=== Ming and Qing dynasties ===
The Ming installed Mu Ying and his family as hereditary aristocrats in Yunnan.

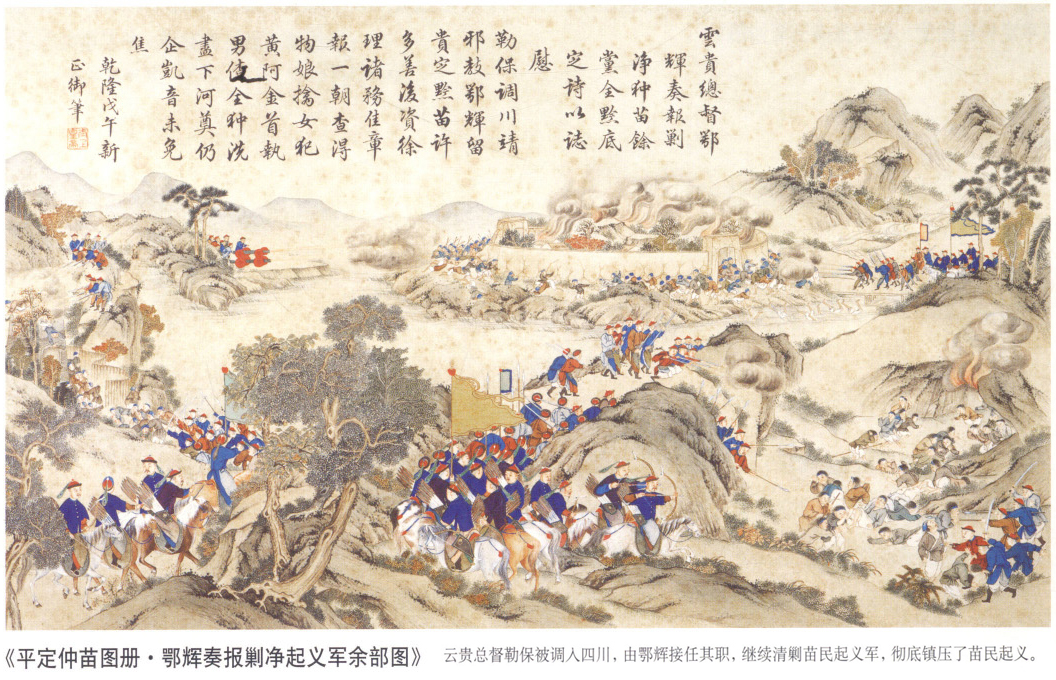
A scene of the Qing campaign against the Miao people in 1795.

During the Ming and Qing dynasties, large areas of Yunnan were administered under the native chieftain system. Under the Qing dynasty a war with Burma also occurred in the 1760s because of the attempted consolidation of borderlands under local chiefs by both China and Burma.

Yunnan was a destination for Han Chinese during Yuan rule. Migrants moved into the area during Ming and Qing rule. During the Ming dynasty, 3 million Han Chinese mostly from Nanjing (the original Nanjing population was later largely replaced by Wu-speakers), and some from Shanxi and Hebei, settled in Yunnan.

Although largely forgotten, the bloody Panthay Rebellion of the Muslim Hui people and other local minorities against the Manchu rulers of the Qing dynasty caused the deaths of up to a million people in Yunnan. The Manchu official Shuxing'a started an anti-Muslim massacre, which led to the rebellion. Shuxing'a developed a deep hatred of Muslims after an incident in which he was stripped naked and nearly lynched by a mob of Muslims. He ordered several Muslim rebels to be slowly sliced to death. Tariq Ali wrote about the real incident in one of his novels and claimed that the Muslims who had nearly lynched Shuxing'a were not Hui but belonged to another ethnicity. Nevertheless, the Manchu official blamed all Muslims for the incident. A British officer testified that the Muslims did not rebel for religious reasons and that the Chinese were tolerant of different religions and were unlikely to have caused the revolt by interfering with the practice of Islam. Loyalist Muslim forces helped Qing forces crush the rebel Muslims. The Qing armies massacred only Muslims who had rebelled or supported the rebels and spared Muslims who took no part in the uprising.

In 1894, George Ernest Morrison, an Australian correspondent for The Times, traveled from Beijing to British-occupied Burma via Yunnan. His book, An Australian in China, details his experiences.

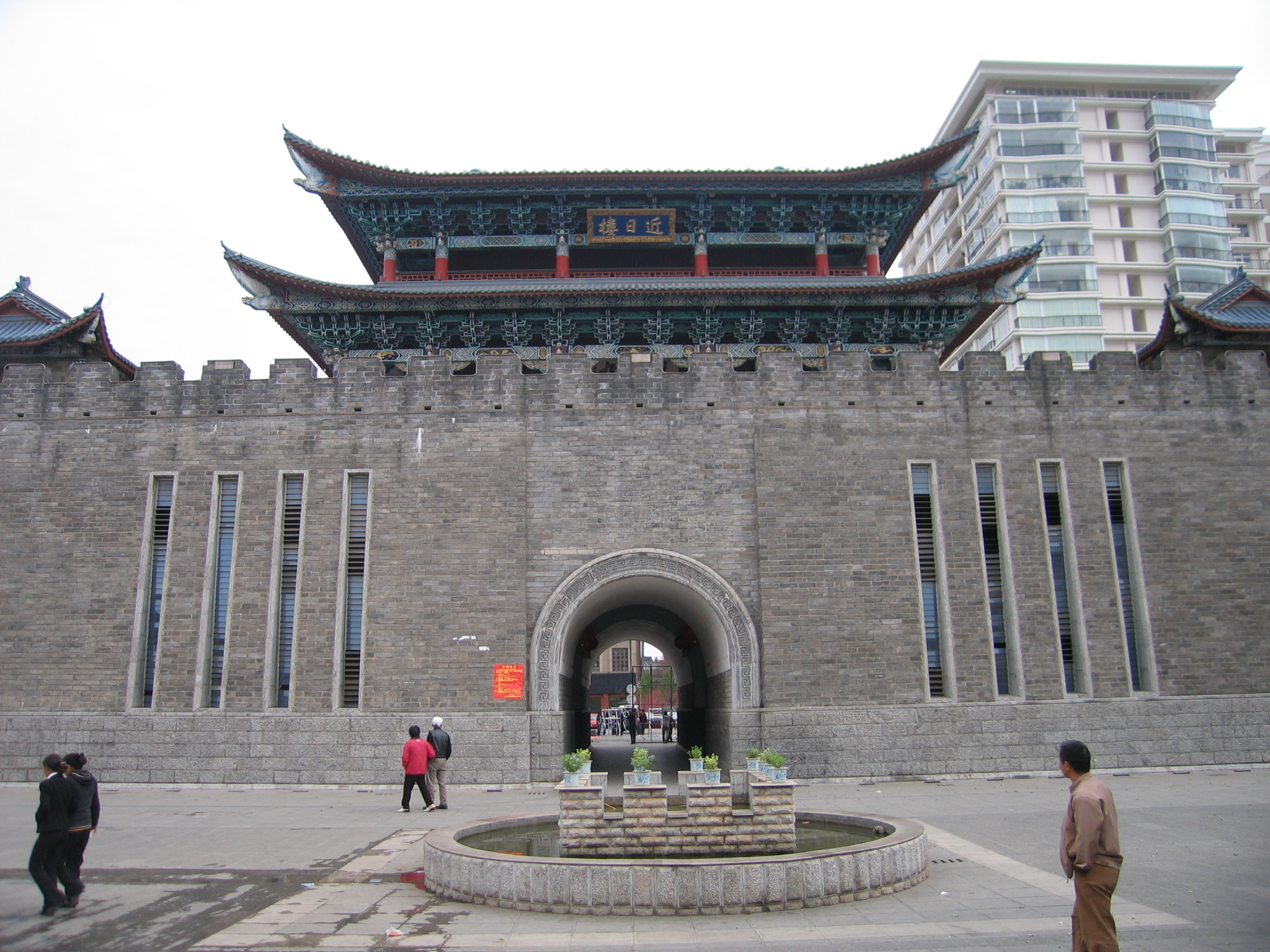
Kunming Street

The 1905 Tibetan Rebellion in which Tibetan Buddhist Lamas attacked and killed French Catholic missionaries spread to Yunnan.

=== Post-Imperial ===
Yunnan as part of the Republic of China era.

Following the collapse of the Qing Dynasty in 1911, Yunnan came under the control of local warlords, who had more than the usual degree of autonomy because of Yunnan's remoteness. They financed their regime by opium harvesting and traffic.

Cai E is regarded as the founder of the Yunnan clique when at the request of Liang Qichao in 1915, he declared Yunnan's opposition to Yuan Shikai's monarchy. Cai died from natural causes shortly after the successful National Protection War. His chief lieutenant, Tang Jiyao, took over Yunnan and demanded that the National Assembly be restored. When that had been accomplished, Yunnan officially reunified with the national government but kept its provincial army separate because of the Beiyang Army's grip in Beijing politics. In 1927, Long Yun seized control of the clique; Tang died shortly afterward. Long then realigned Yunnan with the Nationalist government in Nanjing but stringently guarded the province's autonomy.

Yunnan was transformed by the events of the Second Sino-Japanese War, which caused many refugees and industrial establishments from the eastern coast to relocate to the province. Yunnan served as, among other things, a home base for the Flying Tigers. It assumed strategic significance, particularly as the Burma Road from Lashio, in Burma to Kunming was fought over as a supply line of vital importance to China's war effort.

University faculty and students in the east had originally decamped to Changsha, capital of Hunan. But as Japanese forces were gaining more territory they eventually bombed Changsha in February 1938. The 800 faculty and students who were left had to flee and made the 1,000 mile journey to Kunming, capital of Yunnan in China's mountainous southwest. It was here that the National Southwest Associated University (commonly known as Lianda University) was established. For eight years, staff, professors and students had to survive and operate in makeshift quarters that were subject to sporadic bombing campaigns by the Japanese. There were dire shortages of food, equipment, books, clothing and other essential needs, but they managed to conduct the running of a modern university. Over those eight years of war (1937–1945), Lianda became famous nationwide for having and producing many, if not most, of China's most prominent academics, scholars, scientists and intellectuals. Both of China's only Nobel laureates in physics, Yang Chen-Ning and Tsung-Dao Lee, studied at Lianda in Kunming.

After the end of the Second Sino-Japanese War, Long was removed from office. During the Chinese Civil War, Nationalist forces retreated to the southwest provinces of Szechwan, Sikang, and Yunnan. In 9 December 1949, Chairperson of the Provincial Government Lu Han defected to the Communists and most of the Nationalist troops were defeated in the province. Remnants of the Nationalist forces, led by Li Mi and using Mong Hsat as a base, engaged in guerrilla warfare against the Communists, briefly capturing parts of Yunnan territory. In 1951 the provincial government in exile was dissolved and in 1954, Li Mi's remaining troops retreated to Taiwan. The Kuomintang in Burma continued to operate until 1961.

The establishment of the PRC brought a gradual but definite consolidation to China's southwestern borders and solidified what had been murky claims to various regions. For example, French and British had been active at sites in neighbouring northern Laos, Vietnam, and Burma and even inside modern Yunnan at sites like Tengchong and Gejiu. In fact, between 1904 and 1909, the French had built the 885 km (550 mi) Sino-Vietnamese Railway, which ran from Hanoi to Kunming via Hekou, with a branch to Gejiu. The British tried to match the French effort with the Yunnan–Burma Railway but failed to complete it prior to the outbreak of war, with the project ultimately abandoned.

The PRC also saw a major conflict near the border in 1961 to expel the remaining Nationalists, who then left for Taiwan; some were settled in Thailand. It also saw a bitter Sino-Vietnamese War that was fought along Yunnan's south eastern border, which was properly demarcated only on 23 February 2009, with renewed agreements taking effect as late as 14 July 2010.

=== Naturalists ===
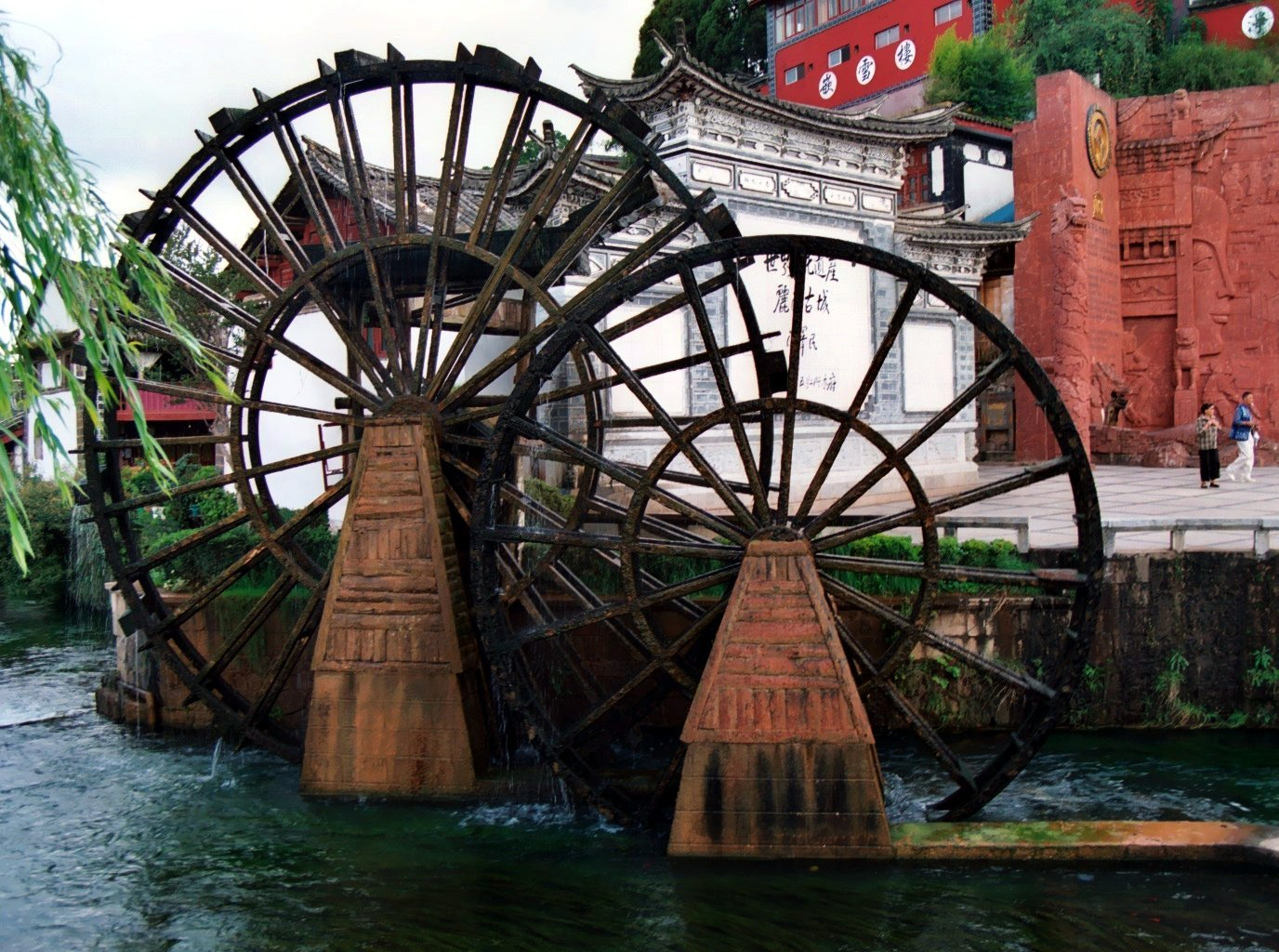
Lijiang

Thousands of plant, insect and mammal species were described in the 19th century by scientists of the French National Museum of Natural History, Paris, in connection with permanent settlements of missionaries of the Missions étrangères de Paris in north-west Yunnan, among them noticeably Jean-André Soulié and Felix Biet.

From 1916 to 1917, Roy Chapman Andrews and Yvette Borup Andrews led the Asiatic Zoological Expedition of the American Museum of Natural History through much of western and southern Yunnan, as well as other provinces of China. Their book Camps and Trails in China records their experiences.

Other notable explorers included Heinrich Handel-Mazzetti; George Forrest; Joseph Francis Charles Rock, who from 1922 to 1949 spent most of his time studying the flora, peoples and languages of southwest China, mainly in Yunnan; and Peter Goullart, a White Russian who studied Naxi culture and lived in Lijiang from 1940 to 1949.

== Geography ==
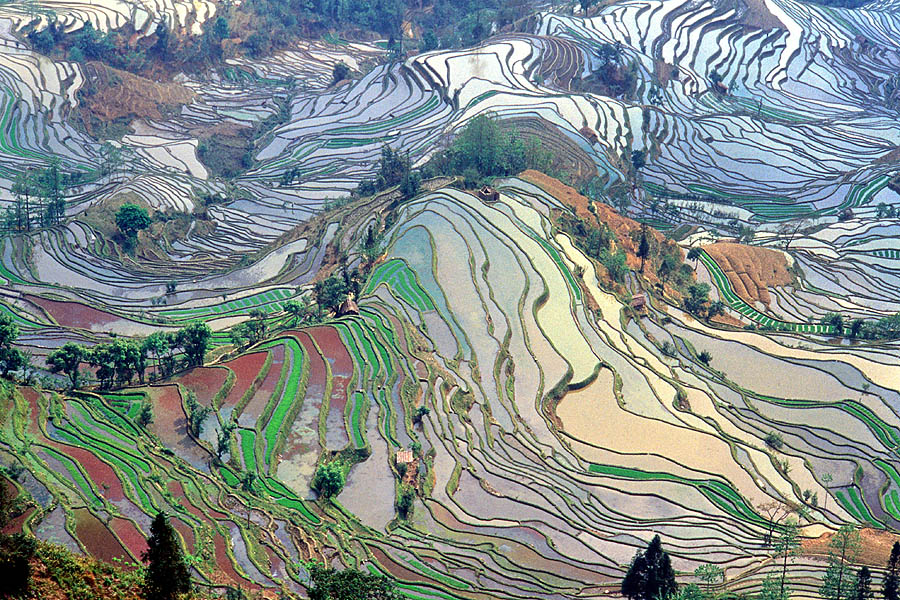
Honghe Hani Rice Terraces in Yunnan

Yunnan is the most southwestern province in China, with the Tropic of Cancer running through its southern part. The province has an area of 394,100 km^{2} (152,200 sq mi), 4.1% of the nation's total. The northern part of the province forms part of the Yunnan–Guizhou Plateau. The province borders Guangxi and Guizhou in the east, Sichuan in the north, and the Tibet Autonomous Region in the northwest. It shares a border of 4,060 km (2,520 mi) with Myanmar (Kachin and Shan States) in the west, Laos (Luang Namtha, Oudomxay, and Phongsaly Provinces) in the south and Vietnam (Hà Giang, Lào Cai, Lai Châu, and Điện Biên Provinces) in the southeast. For practical purposes, all of Yunnan falls within the Zomia region of Asia.

=== Geology ===
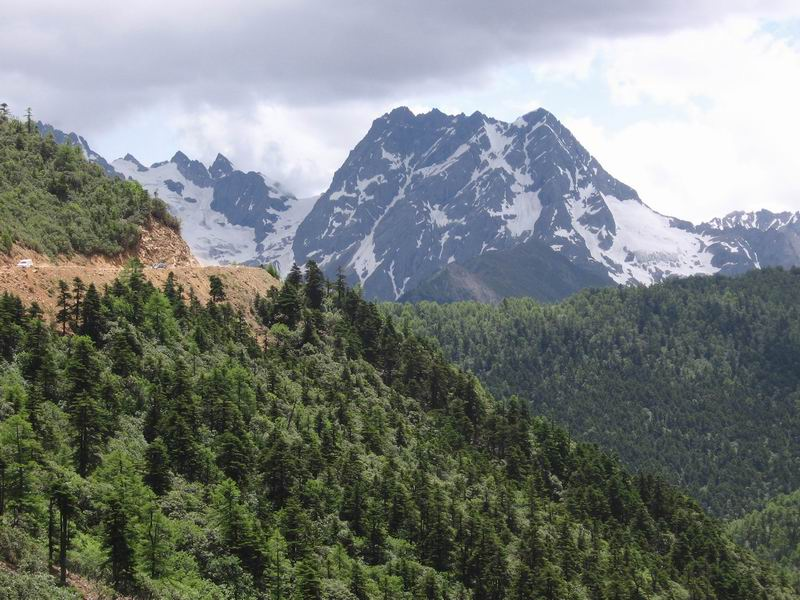
Snowy mountains in Dêqên, northwestern Yunnan

Yunnan is at the far eastern edge of the Himalayan uplift, and was pushed up in the Pleistocene, primarily in the Middle Pleistocene, although the uplift continues into the present. The eastern part of the province is a limestone plateau with karst topography and unnavigable rivers flowing through deep mountain gorges.

The main surface formations of the plateau are the Lower Permian Maokou Formation, characterized by thick limestone deposits, the Lower Permian Qixia Formation, characterised by dolomitic limestones and dolomites, the Upper Permian basalts of the Ermeishan Formation (formerly Omeishan plateau basalts), and the red sandstones, mudstones, siltstones, and conglomerates of the Mesozoic–Paleogene, including the Lufeng Formation and the Lunan Group (Lumeiyi, Xiaotun, and Caijiacong formations). In the area is the noted Stone Forest, or Shilin, which is eroded vertical pinnacles of limestone (Maokou Formation). In the east, the rivers generally run eastwards. The western half is characterized by mountain ranges and rivers running north and south.

=== Paleontology ===
- Yunnanozoon – Lower Cambrian possible chordate
- Jingshanosaurus – Early Jurassic long-neck prosauropod dinosaur

=== Climate ===
Köppen climate classification map of Yunnan

Yunnan has a generally mild climate with pleasant and fair weather because of the province's location on south-facing mountain slopes, receiving the influence of both the Pacific and Indian oceans, and although the growing period is long, the rugged terrain provides little arable land. See Agriculture in Yunnan. Under the Köppen climate classification, much of the province lies within the subtropical highland (Köppen Cwb) or humid subtropical zone (Cwa), with cool to warm winters, and temperate summers, except in the truly tropical south, where temperatures regularly exceed 30 °C (86 °F) in the warmer half of the year. In general, January average temperatures range from 8 to 17 °C (46 to 63 °F); July averages vary from 21 to 27 °C (70 to 81 °F). Average annual rainfall ranges from 600 to 2,300 mm (24 to 91 in), with over half the rain occurring between June and August. The plateau region has moderate temperatures. The western canyon region is hot at the valley bottoms, but there are freezing winds at the mountaintops.

=== Topography ===
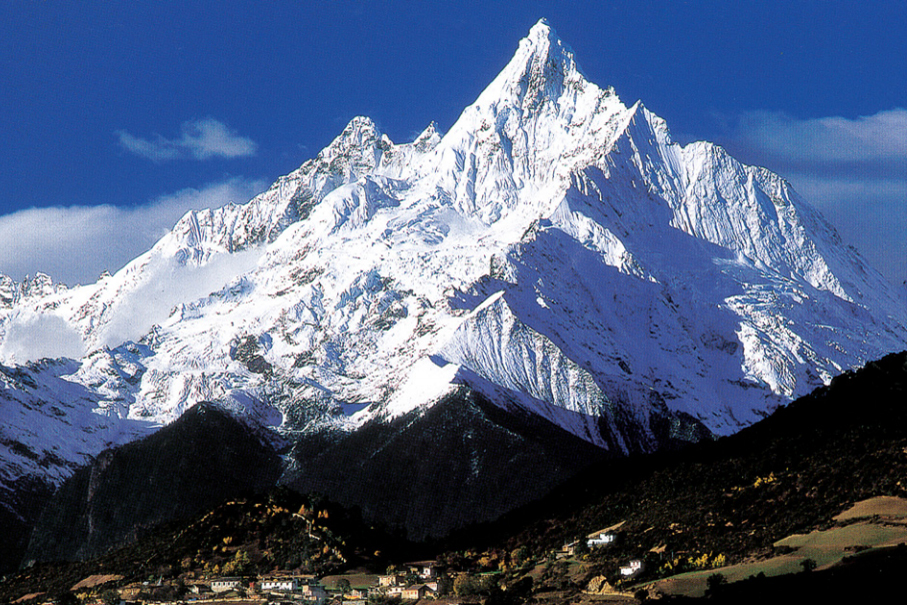
Meili Snow Mountains

The terrain is largely mountainous, especially in the north and west. A series of high mountain chains spreads across the province. There is a distinct canyon region to the west and a plateau region to the east. Yunnan's major rivers flow through the deep valleys between the mountains.

The average elevation is 1,980 m (6,500 ft). The mountains are highest in the north where they reach more than 5,000 m (16,000 ft); in the south they rise no higher than 3,000 m (9,800 ft). The highest point in the north is the Kawagebo Peak in Deqin County on the Diqing Plateau, which is about 6,740 m (22,110 ft); and the lowest is in the Red River Valley in Hekou County, near the Vietnamese border, with an elevation of 76.4 m (251 ft).

The eastern half of the province is a limestone plateau with karst scenery and unnavigable rivers flowing through deep mountain gorges; the western half is characterised by mountain ranges and rivers running north and south. They include the Nu Jiang (Salween), the Lancang (Mekong), and the Jinsha (Yangtze), which flow near the Three Parallel Rivers protected area. The rugged, vertical terrain produces a wide range of flora and fauna, and the province has been called a natural zoological and botanical garden.

=== Borders ===
Bordering Chinese provincial-level divisions are Tibet, Sichuan, Guizhou and Guangxi. Starting from the east and working clockwise, bordering countries are Vietnam (Hà Giang, Lào Cai, Lai Châu and Điện Biên provinces), Laos (Phongsaly, Oudomxay and Luang Namtha provinces), Myanmar (states of Shan and Kachin). The main border crossings are:

- Hekou–Lào Cai, by road and rail, is the only Sino-Vietnamese land border crossing open to non-Chinese/non-Vietnamese.
- Sino-Laotian at Boten
- Ruili–Muse is the only Sino-Burmese border crossing open to non-Chinese/non-Burmese.

=== Lakes ===
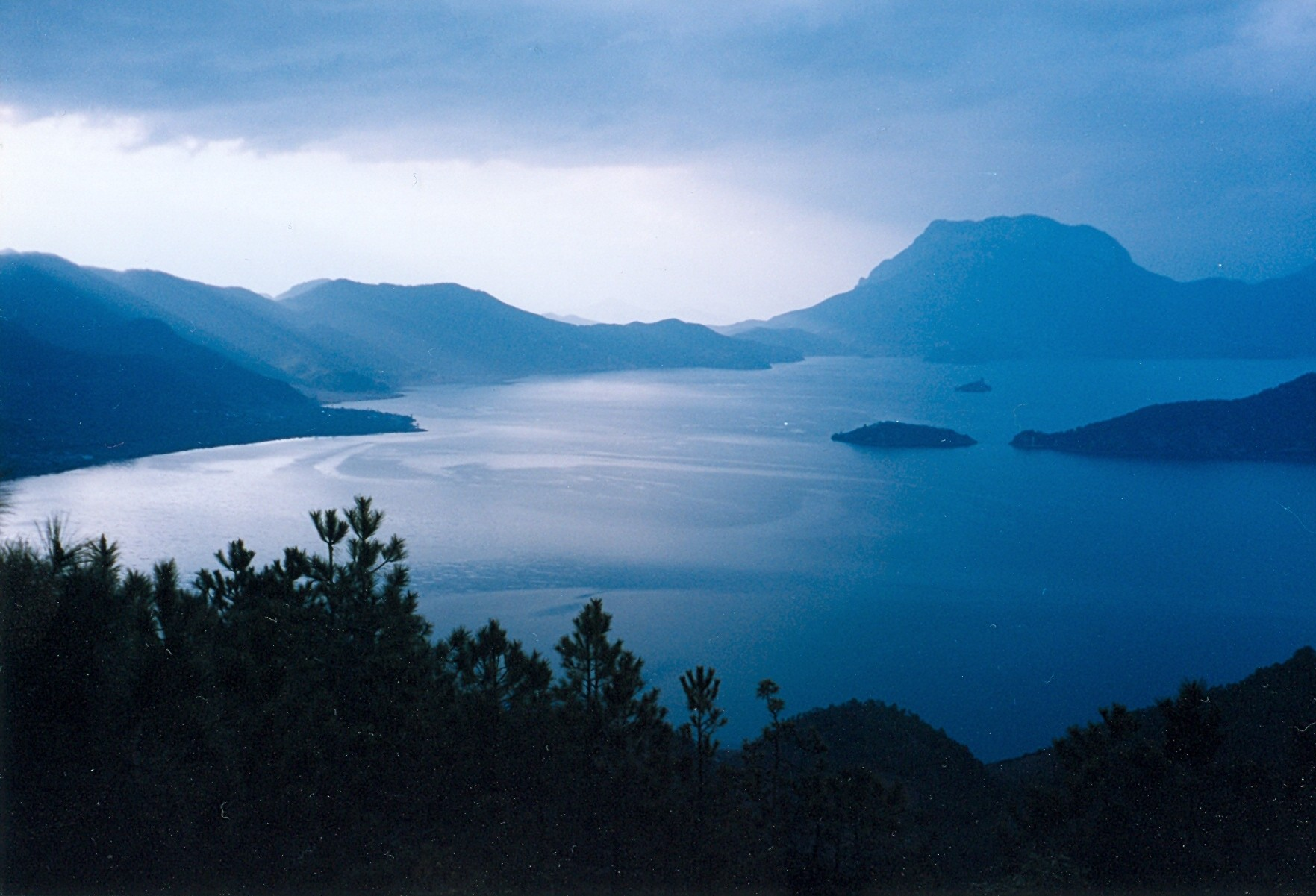
Lugu Lake

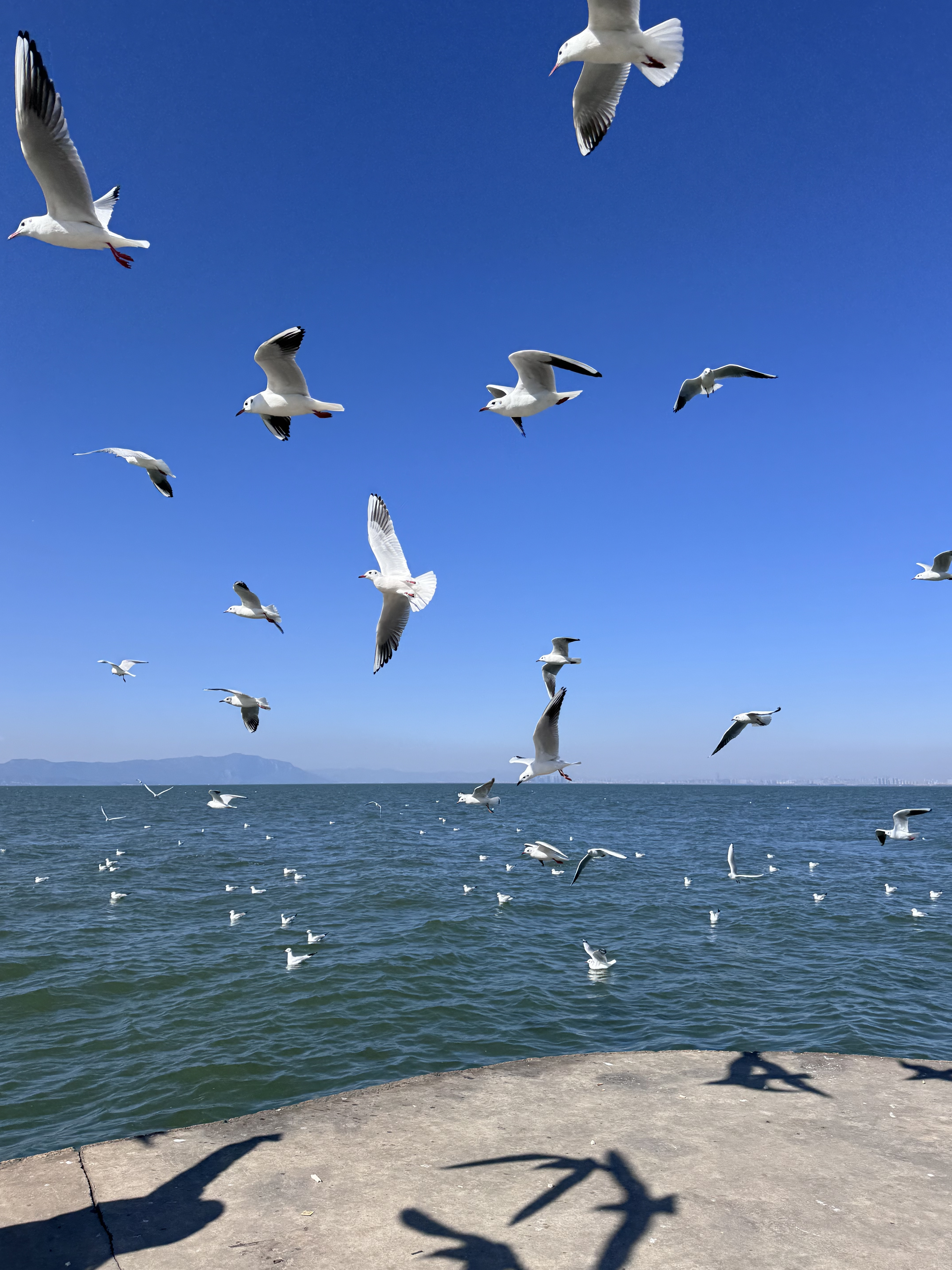
Dianchi Lake

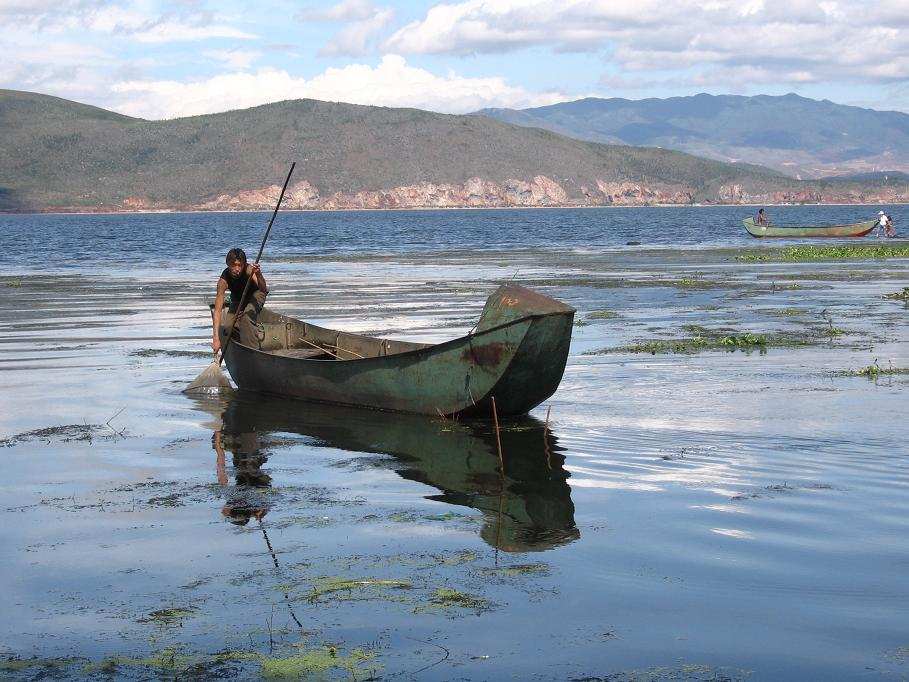
Erhai Lake, Dali, Yunnan

There are several major lakes in Yunnan. The province has nine lakes with areas of over 30 km^{2} (12 sq mi). They include:

- Dianchi Lake, near Kunming
- Fuxian Lake, in Yuxi, the second deepest lake in China
- Xingyun Lake, directly south of Fuxian Lake and connected with it by a short river
- Qilu Lake, south of Fuxian and Xingyun Lakes, separated from them by mountains, in Tonghai County
- Erhai Lake, near Dali City
- Lugu Lake, in Ninglang near the border with Sichuan
- Yangzong Lake, in Yiliang County
- Yilong Lake
- Green Lake, in Kunming

=== Rivers ===
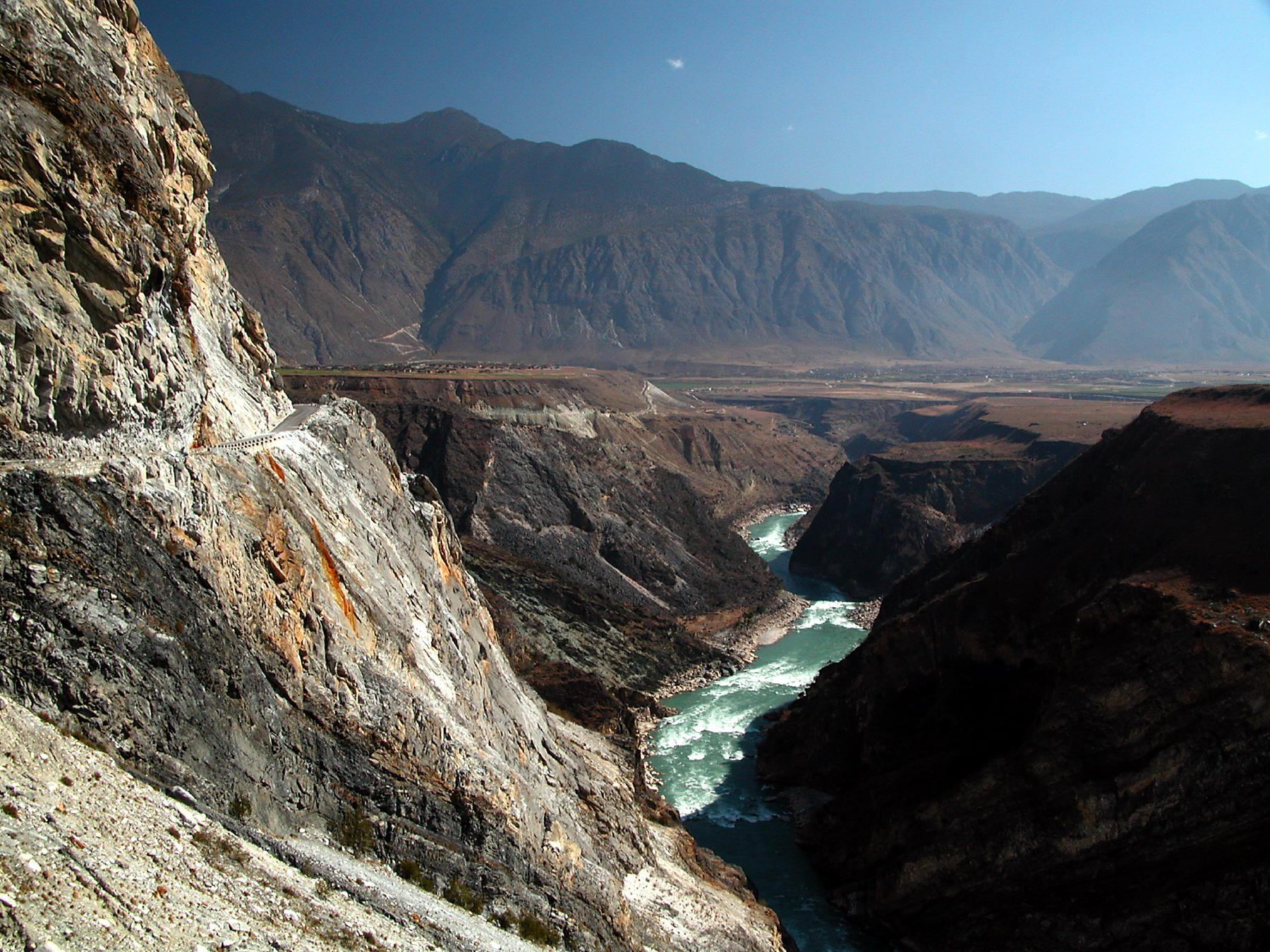
The Yangtze River near the Tiger Leaping Gorge

Yunnan is the source of two rivers, the Xi River (there known as the Nanpan and Hongshui) and the Yuan River. The Hongshui is a principal source stream of the Xi River. Rising as the Nanpan in eastern Yunnan, it flows south and east to form part of the boundary between Guizhou province and Guangxi autonomous region. Flowing for 345 km (214 mi), it unites with the Yu River at Guiping to form what eventually becomes the Xi River.

The province is drained by six major river systems:

- the Yangtze River, here known as the Jinsha Jiang (River of Golden Sands), drains the province's north.
- the Pearl River, with its source near Qujing, collects the waters from the east.
- the Mekong (Lancang), which flows from Tibet into the South China Sea forming the boundaries between Laos and Burma, between Laos and Thailand and through Laos, Cambodia and Vietnam
- the Red River (Yuan or Honghe) has its source in the mountains south of Dali and enters the South China Sea through Hanoi, Vietnam
- the Salween (Nujiang), which flows into the Gulf of Martaban and the Andaman Sea through Burma
- the Irrawaddy, which arises from the confluence of two rivers in Kachin State in Burma, has a few small tributaries in Yunnan's far west, such as the Dulongjiang and Taping River, and rivers in the prefecture of Dehong.

=== Biodiversity ===
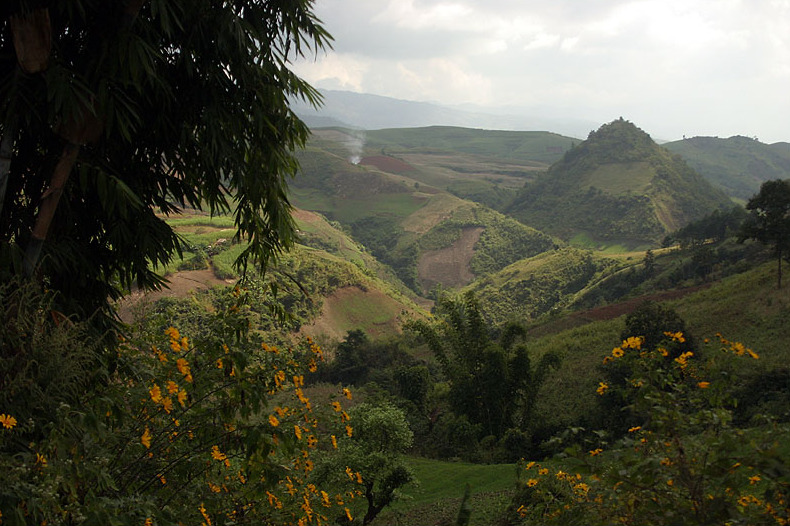
Lincang mountains

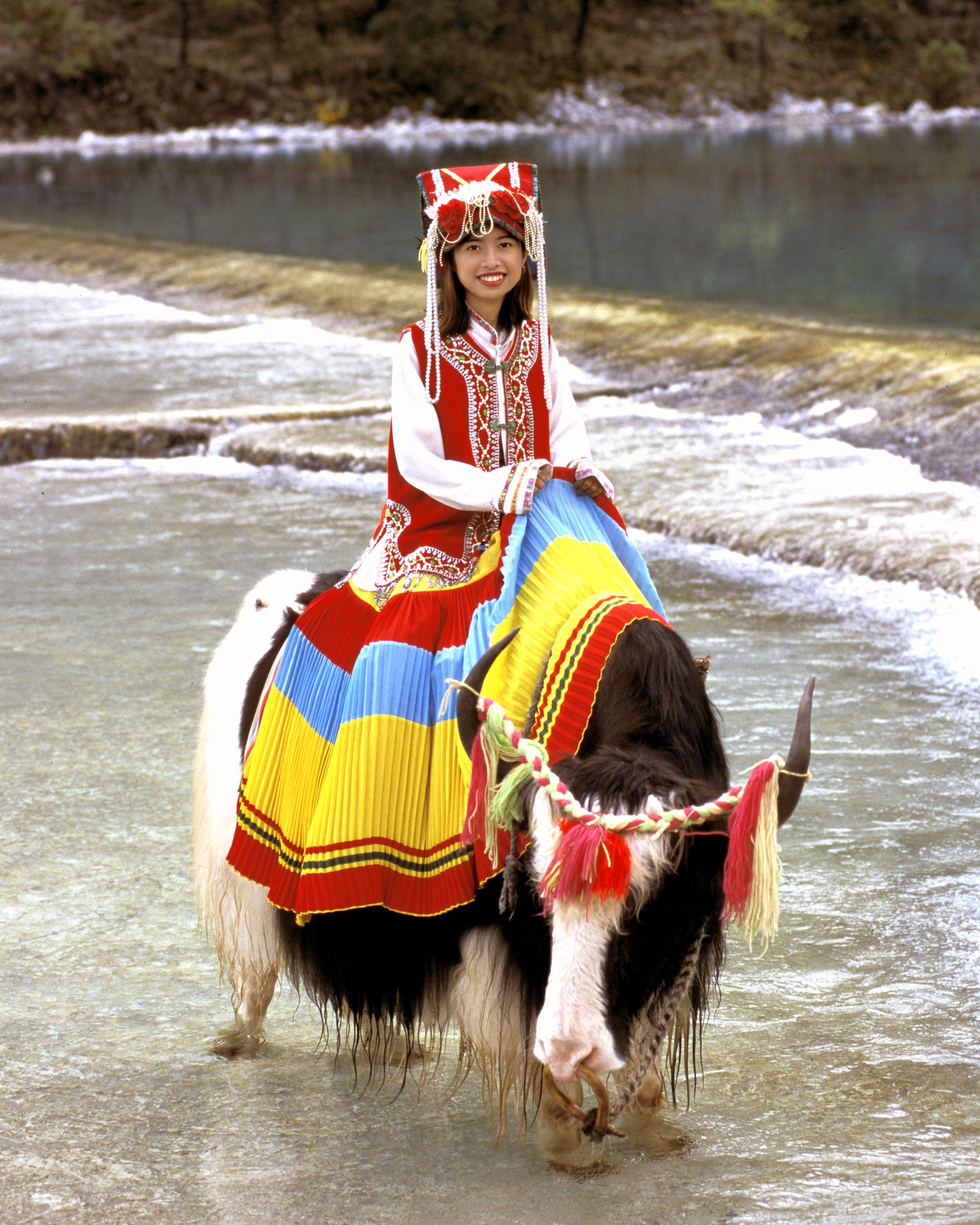
Girl riding a yak in Yunnan

Yunnan is China's most biologically diverse province. The province contains snow-capped mountains and true tropical environments, supporting a wide variety of species and vegetation types. The Yunnan camellia (Camellia reticulata) is the provincial emblem.

During summer, the Great Plateau of Tibet acts as a barrier to monsoon winds, trapping moisture in the province and giving the alpine flora, in particular, what one source has called a "lushness found nowhere else."

The topographic range combined with a tropical moisture sustains extremely high biodiversity and high degrees of endemism, probably the richest botanically in the world's temperate regions. Perhaps 17,000 species of higher plants, of which an estimated 2,500 are endemic, can be found in the province. The province is said to have "as much flowering plant diversity as the rest of the Northern Hemisphere put together."

Yunnan has less than 4% of the land of China, yet the province harbors around 42.6% of all protected plant species and 72.5% of all protected wild animals in the country, of which 15% are strictly endemic to Yunnan. Accordingly, Yunnan has been referred to as the "Kingdom of Plants" (植物王国) in China. Yunnan is home to, most notably, the southeast Asian gaur, a giant forest-dwelling bovine, the Indochinese tiger and the Asian elephant. Other extremely rare species are the Yunnan box turtle and the Yunnan snub-nosed monkey. It is feared that the Yunnan lar gibbon, another moribund species, has already gone extinct. Yunnan has 11 national and regional nature reserves. In total, the covered protected area in China is about 510,000 hectares.

The freshwater fish fauna is highly diverse with about 620 species, including more than 580 natives (the remaining are introduced). That is almost 40% of the freshwater fish species in China. Of the Yunnan natives, more than 250 are endemic to the province, and many of them are threatened. Several species that are restricted to single lakes (notably Dian, Erhai, Fuxian and Yilong) are likely already are extinct. By far, the most diverse order in Yunnan are Cypriniformes, both in total species number and number of endemics.

The unique Sinopyrophorus bioluminescent beetles were described from Yunnan in 2019.

=== Designation ===
Yunnan has been designated:

- "Center of Plant Diversity" (IUCN/WWF: Davis et al. 1995)
- "Global 200 List Priority Ecoregion" for biodiversity conservation (WWF: Olsen and Dinerstein 1998)
- "Endemic Bird Area" (Birdlife International: Bibby, C. et al. 1992) and
- "Global Biodiversity Hotspot," as part of the Hengduan Mountain Ecosystem (Conservation International: Mittermeier and Mittermeier 1997)

=== Natural resources ===
A main source of wealth lies in its vast mineral resources; indeed, mining is the leading industry in Yunnan. Yunnan has proven deposits of 86 kinds of minerals in 2,700 places. Some 13% of the proved deposits of minerals are the largest of their kind in China, and two-thirds of the deposits are among the largest of their kind in the Yangtze River valley and in south China. Yunnan ranks first in the country in deposits of zinc, lead, tin, cadmium, indium, thallium and crocidolite. Other deposits include iron, coal, copper, gold, mercury, silver, antimony and sulfur. More than 150 kinds of minerals have been discovered in the province. The potential value of the proven deposits in Yunnan is 3 trillion yuan, 40% of which come from fuel minerals, 7.3% from metallic minerals and 52.7% from nonmetallic minerals.

Yunnan has sufficient rainfall and many rivers and lakes. The annual water flow originating in the province is 200 cubic kilometres, three times that of the Yellow River. The rivers flowing into the province from outside add 160 cubic kilometres, which means there are more than 10,000 cubic metres of water for each person in the province, four times the average in the country. The rich water resources offer abundant hydro-energy. China is constructing a series of dams on the Mekong to develop it as a waterway and source of power; the first was completed at Manwan in 1993.

== Scenic areas ==
=== National parks ===
- Pudacuo National Park, opened in 2007, in Shangri-La County
- Laojunshan National Park (老君山国家公园), in Lijiang, pending approval

=== UNESCO World Heritage Sites ===
- Old Town of Lijiang, accepted in 1997 as a cultural site
- Three Parallel Rivers of Yunnan Protected Areas, accepted in 2003 as a natural site
- South China Karst, accepted in 2007 as a natural site
- Maotianshan Shales, accepted in 2012 as a natural site
- Cultural Landscape of Honghe Hani Rice Terraces, accepted in 2013 as a cultural site

== Administrative divisions ==
Yunnan consists of sixteen prefecture-level divisions: eight prefecture-level cities and eight autonomous prefectures:

Administrative divisions of Yunnan
Division code	Division	Area in km^{2}	Population 2020	Seat	Divisions			
Division code	Division	Area in km^{2}	Population 2020	Seat	Districts	Counties	Aut. counties	CL cities
530000	Yunnan Province	394,000.00	47,209,277	Kunming city	17	65	29	18
530100	Kunming city	21,001.28	8,460,088	Chenggong District	7	3	3	1
530300	Qujing city	28,939.41	5,765,775	Qilin District	3	5		1
530400	Yuxi city	14,941.53	2,249,502	Hongta District	2	4	3	
530500	Baoshan city	19,064.60	2,431,211	Longyang District	1	3		1
530600	Zhaotong city	22,439.76	5,092,611	Zhaoyang District	1	9		1
530700	Lijiang city	20,557.25	1,253,878	Gucheng District	1	2	2	
530800	Pu'er city	44,264.79	2,404,954	Simao District	1		9	
530900	Lincang city	23,620.72	2,257,991	Linxiang District	1	4	3	
532300	Chuxiong Yi Autonomous Prefecture	28,436.87	2,416,747	Chuxiong city		8		2
532500	Honghe Hani and Yi Autonomous Prefecture	32,167.67	4,478,422	Mengzi city		6	3	4
532600	Wenshan Zhuang and Miao Autonomous Prefecture	31,409.12	3,503,218	Wenshan city		7		1
532800	Xishuangbanna Dai Autonomous Prefecture	19,107.05	1,301,407	Jinghong city		2		1
532900	Dali Bai Autonomous Prefecture	28,299.43	3,337,559	Dali city		8	3	1
533100	Dehong Dai and Jingpo Autonomous Prefecture	11,171.41	1,315,709	Mang city		3		2
533300	Nujiang Lisu Autonomous Prefecture	14,588.92	552,694	Lushui city		1	2	1
533400	Dêqên Tibetan Autonomous Prefecture	23,185.59	387,511	Shangri-La city		1	1	1

Administrative divisions in Chinese and varieties of romanizations
English	Chinese	Pinyin
Yunnan Province	云南省	Yúnnán Shěng
Kunming city	昆明市	Kūnmíng Shì
Qujing city	曲靖市	Qǔjìng Shì
Yuxi city	玉溪市	Yùxī Shì
Baoshan city	保山市	Bǎoshān Shì
Zhaotong city	昭通市	Zhāotōng Shì
Lijiang city	丽江市	Lìjiāng Shì
Pu'er city	普洱市	Pǔ'ěr Shì
Lincang city	临沧市	Líncāng Shì
Chuxiong Yi Autonomous Prefecture	楚雄彝族自治州	Chǔxióng Yízú Zìzhìzhōu
Honghe Hani and Yi Autonomous Prefecture	红河哈尼族彝族自治州	Hónghé Hānízú Yízú Zìzhìzhōu
Wenshan Zhuang and Miao Autonomous Prefecture	文山壮族苗族自治州	Wénshān Zhuàngzú Miáozú Zìzhìzhōu
Xishuangbanna Dai Autonomous Prefecture	西双版纳傣族自治州	Xīshuāngbǎnnà Dǎizú Zìzhìzhōu
Dali Bai Autonomous Prefecture	大理白族自治州	Dàlǐ Báizú Zìzhìzhōu
Dehong Dai and Jingpo Autonomous Prefecture	德宏傣族景颇族自治州	Déhóng Dǎizú Jǐngpōzú Zìzhìzhōu
Nujiang Lisu Autonomous Prefecture	怒江傈僳族自治州	Nùjiāng Lìsùzú Zìzhìzhōu
Dêqên Tibetan Autonomous Prefecture	迪庆藏族自治州	Díqìng Zàngzú Zìzhìzhōu

The 16 prefecture-level divisions are in turn subdivided into 129 county-level divisions (17 districts, 18 county-level cities, 65 counties, and 29 autonomous counties). At the end of the year 2021, the total population is 48.01 million.

Population by urban areas of prefecture and county cities
#	Cities	2020 Urban area	2010 Urban area	2020 City proper
1	Kunming (Note: Dongchuan is a satellite urban area separated from Kunming and it is not included in the urban area count.)	5,273,144	3,140,777 (Note: New districts established after 2010 census: Chenggong (Chenggong County), Jinning (Jinning County). These new districts not included in the urban area count of the pre-expanded city.)	8,460,088
2	Qujing	1,043,665	468,437 (Note: New districts established after 2010 census: Zhanyi (Zhanyi County), Malong (Malong County). These new districts not included in the urban area count of the pre-expanded city.)	5,765,775
3	Xuanwei	691,922	584,076	see Qujing
4	Zhaotong	589,260	255,861	5,092,611
5	Yuxi	549,610	306,879 (Note: New district established after 2010 census: Jiangchuan (Jiangchuan County). The new district not included in the urban area count of the pre-expanded city.)	2,249,502
6	Dali	549,189	367,122	part of Dali Prefecture
7	Mengzi	430,355	(Note: Mengzi County is currently known as Mengzi CLC after 2010 census.)	part of Honghe Prefecture
8	Chuxiong	426,823	331,991	part of Chuxiong Prefecture
9	Wenshan	424,760	(Note: Wenshan County is currently known as Wenshan CLC after 2010 census.)	part of Wenshan Prefecture
10	Anning	399,779	242,151	see Kunming
11	Baoshan	378,240	263,380	2,431,211
12	Jinghong	358,517	205,523	part of Xishuangbanna Prefecture
13	Pu'er	327,733	185,473	2,404,954
14	Gejiu	310,521	163,528	part of Honghe Prefecture
15	Mile	287,637	(Note: Mile County is currently known as Mile CLC after 2010 census.)	part of Honghe Prefecture
16	Tengchong	238,974	(Note: Tengchong County is currently known as Tengchong CLC after 2010 census.)	see Baoshan
17	Lijiang	238,828	151,744	1,253,878
18	Kaiyuan	227,231	210,801	part of Honghe Prefecture
19	Mangshi (Note: Mangshi CLC formerly known as Luxi CLC until 20 July 2010.)	216426	131,425	part of Dehong Prefecture
20	Lincang	211,878	142,095	2,257,991
21	Ruili	208,658	99,148	part of Dehong Prefecture
22	Dongchuan	160,192	113,632	see Kunming
23	Lushui	148,759	(Note: Lushui County is currently known as Lushui CLC after 2010 census.)	part of Nujiang Prefecture
24	Chengjiang	81,492	(Note: Chengjiang County is currently known as Chengjiang CLC after 2010 census.)	see Yuxi
25	Shangri-La	75,300	(Note: Shangri-La County is currently known as Shangri-La CLC after 2010 census.)	part of Dêqên Prefecture
26	Shuifu	68,389	(Note: Shuifu County is currently known as Shuifu CLC after 2010 census.)	see Zhaotong

== Politics ==
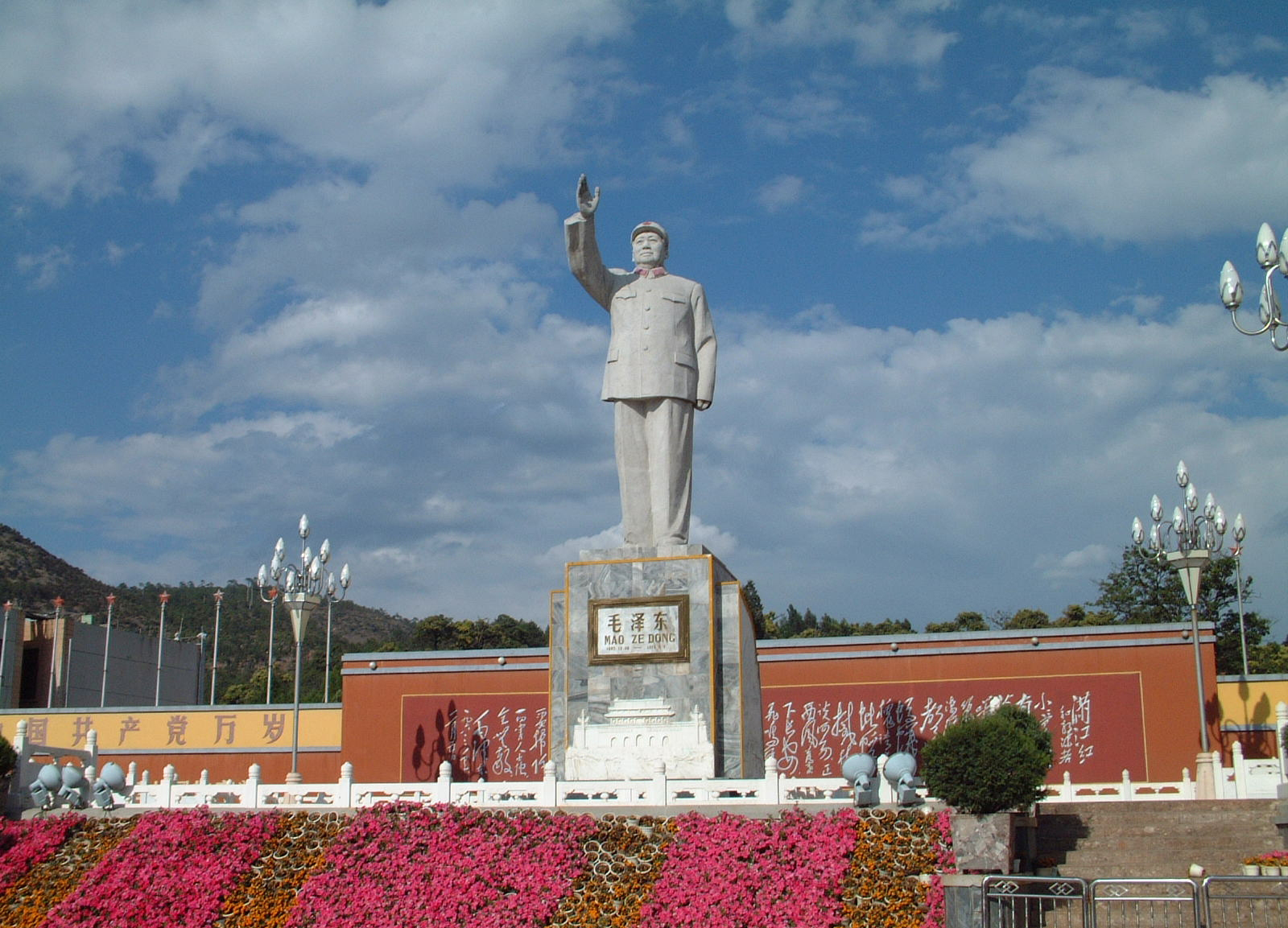
Statue of Mao Zedong in Lijiang

The Yunnan Provincial Committee of the Chinese Communist Party (CCP) is the province's top authority. The secretary of the CCP Yunnan Committee is the highest ranking and most important position in Yunnan. The Governor is the second highest office in Yunnan, after the Secretary of the CCP Yunnan Committee. The Governor, who is elected by the Yunnan Provincial People's Congress, is responsible for all economic, environmental, political, personnel and foreign affairs issues concerning Yunnan.

1. Chen Geng (陈赓): March 1950 – February 1955
2. Guo Yingqiu (郭影秋): February 1955 – November 1958
3. Ding Yichuan (丁一川): November 1958 – January 1965
4. Zhou Xing (周兴): January 1965 – 1966
5. Tan Furen (谭甫仁): August 1968 – October 1970
6. Zhou Xing: October 1970 – October 1975
7. Jia Qiyun (贾启允): October 1975 – February 1977
8. An Pingsheng (安平生): February 1977 – December 1979
9. Liu Minghui (刘明辉): December 1979 – April 1983
10. Pu Chaozhu (普朝柱): April 1983 – August 1985
11. He Zhiqiang (和志强): August 1985 – January 1998
12. Li Jiating (李嘉廷): January 1998 – June 2001
13. Xu Rongkai (徐荣凯): June 2001 – November 2006
14. Qin Guangrong (秦光荣): January 2007 – August 2011
15. Li Jiheng (李纪恒): August 2011 – October 2014
16. Chen Hao (陈豪): October 2014 – December 2016
17. Ruan Chengfa (阮成发): December 2016 – November 2020
18. Wang Yubo (王予波): November 2020 – November 2026
19. Liu Qifan (刘奇凡): November 2026 – present

== Demographics ==
Historical population
Year	Pop.	±%
1912	9,468,000	—
1928	13,821,000	+46.0%
1936–37	12,042,000	−12.9%
1947	9,066,000	−24.7%
1954	17,472,737	+92.7%
1964	20,509,525	+17.4%
1982	32,553,817	+58.7%
1990	36,972,610	+13.6%
2000	42,360,089	+14.6%
2010	45,966,239	+8.5%
2020	47,209,277	+2.7%

According to Yunnan government statistics, there are approximately 2.5 million overseas Chinese whose ancestral homeland is from Yunnan.

Largest cities in Yunnan Source: China Urban Construction Statistical Yearbook 2018 Urban Population and Urban Temporary Population
Rank		Pop.	Rank		Pop.
1	Kunming	3,979,700	11	Wenshan	234,400
2	Qujing	792,500	12	Pu'er	228,000
3	Yuxi	384,700	13	Kaiyuan	202,200
4	Baoshan	355,500	14	Gejiu	202,000
5	Zhaotong	319,800	15	Lincang	195,200
6	Chuxiong	319,000	16	Lijiang	189,300
7	Dali	313,800	17	Jinghong	186,300
8	Mengzi	293,200	18	Tengchong	180,000
9	Xuanwei	290,100	19	Ruili	176,000
10	Anning	272,500	20	Mile	171,800

=== Ethnicity ===
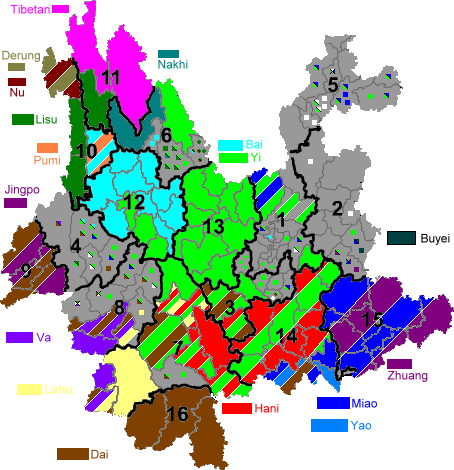
Major autonomous areas within Yunnan (excluding Hui)

Yunnan is noted for a very high level of ethnic diversity. It has the highest number of ethnic groups among the provinces and autonomous regions in China. Among the country's 56 recognised ethnic groups, twenty-five are found in Yunnan. Some 38% of the province population are members of ethnic minorities, including the Yi, Bai, Hani, Tai, Dai, Miao, Lisu, Hui, Lahu, Wa, Nakhi, Yao, Tibetans, Jingpo, Blang, Pumi, Nu, Achang, Jinuo, Mongols, Derung, Manchus, Sui, and Buyei. Several other groups are represented, but they neither live in compact settlements nor reach the required threshold of five thousand to be awarded the official status of being present in the province. Some groups, such as the Mosuo, who are officially recognised as part of the Naxi, have in the past claimed official status as a national minority; they are now recognised with the status of Mosuo people.

Ethnic groups are widely distributed in the province. Some twenty-five minorities live in compact communities, each of which has a population of more than five thousand. Ten ethnic minorities living in border areas and river valleys include the Hui, Manchus, Bai, Naxi, Mongols, Zhuang, Dai, Achang, Buyei and Shui, with a combined population of 4.5 million; those in low mountainous areas are the Hani, Yao, Lahu, Va, Jingpo, Blang, and Jino, with a combined population of 5 million; and those in high mountainous areas are Miao, Lisu, Tibetan, Pumi, and Drung, with a total population of four million.

=== Languages ===
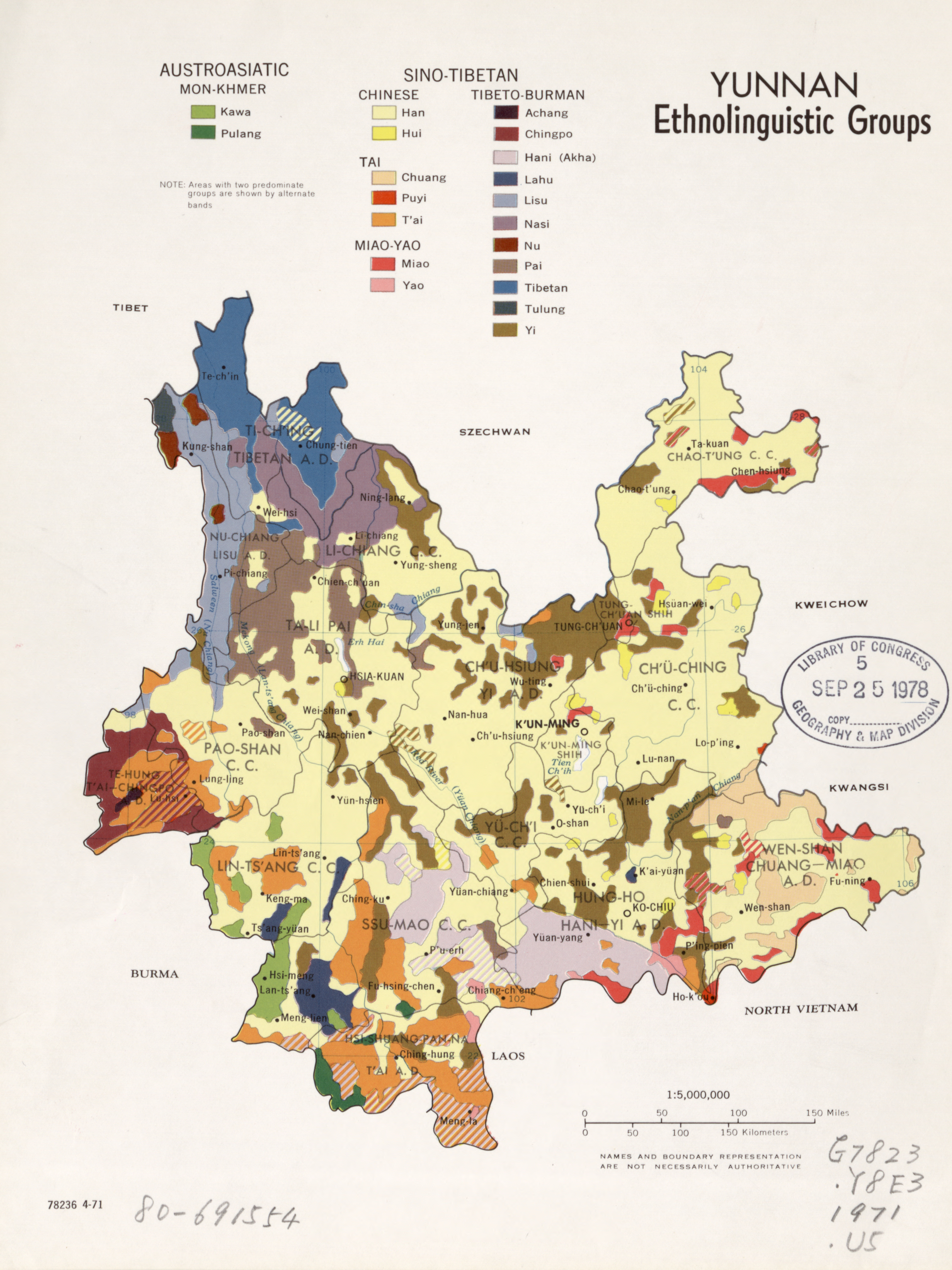
CIA map showing the territory of the settlement of ethnolinguistic groups in Yunnan (1971).

Most dialects of the Chinese language spoken in Yunnan belong to the southwestern subdivision of the Mandarin group, and are therefore very similar to the dialects of neighboring Sichuan and Guizhou provinces. Notable features found in many Yunnan dialects include the partial or complete loss of distinction between finals /n/ and /ŋ/, as well as the lack of /y/. In addition to the local dialects, most people also speak Standard Chinese (Putonghua, commonly called "Mandarin"), which is used in the media, by the government, and as the language of instruction in education.

Spoken in the provincial capital, the Kunming dialect belongs to the Central Yunnan group of Mandarin varieties. Even in Kunming, different districts have developed their own variations of Kunming dialect. For example, residents of Guandu district of Kunming speak the Guandu dialect, which has differences from the pronunciation and the intonation of Kunming dialect.

Yunnan's ethnic diversity is reflected in its linguistic diversity. Languages spoken in Yunnan include Tibeto-Burman languages such as Bai, Yi, Tibetan, Hani, Jingpo, Lisu, Lahu, Naxi; Tai languages like Zhuang, Bouyei, Dong, Shui, Tai Lü and Tai Nüa; Austroasiatic languages such as Palaung, Wa, U, Hu, Mang, Man Met, Va, Bugan, Muak, and Bumang; as well as Hmong–Mien languages.

The Naxi, in particular, use the Dongba script, which is the only pictographic writing system in use in the world today. The Dongba script was mainly used to provide the Dongba priests with instructions on how to carry out their rituals: today the Dongba script features more as a tourist attraction. Perhaps the best known Western Dongba scholar was Joseph Rock.

=== Literacy ===
By the end of 1998, among the province's population, 419,800 had received college education or above, 2.11 million senior middle school education, 8.3 million junior middle school education, 18.25 million primary school education, and 8.25 million aged 15 or above were illiterate or semi-literate.

=== Religion ===
Religion in Yunnan (2005)
1. Atheist (91.3%)
2. Buddhism (6.00%)
3. Islam (1.40%)
4. Christianity (1.30%)

According to a demographic analysis of religious people in Yunnan, almost 90% of followers of government-sanctioned organised religions belonged to ethnic minorities. As of 2005 the province had around 4 million believers of the five government-sanctioned organised religious doctrines of China:

- 2.6 million or about 6% of the total population are Buddhists;
- 620,000 or 1.4% are Muslims;
- 530,000 or 1.2% are Protestants;
- 240,000 or 0.5% are Taoists ("Taoist" traditionally includes only priests);
- 66,000 or 0.1% are Catholics.

According to surveys conducted in 2004 and 2007, in those years approximately 32.22% of the province's population was involved in worship of ancestors and 2.75% declared a Christian identity.

Most of the population of the province practices traditional indigenous religions including the Chinese folk religion among the Han Chinese, Bimoism among the Yi peoples and Benzhuism among the Bai people. The Dai people are one of the few ethnic minorities of China that traditionally follow the Theravada branch of Buddhism, making Yunnan the only province in China where all three major Buddhist schools are widely practiced. Most of the Hui people of the region are Muslims. Christianity is dominant among the Lisu, the Jingpo and the Derung ethnic groups.

==== Image gallery ====
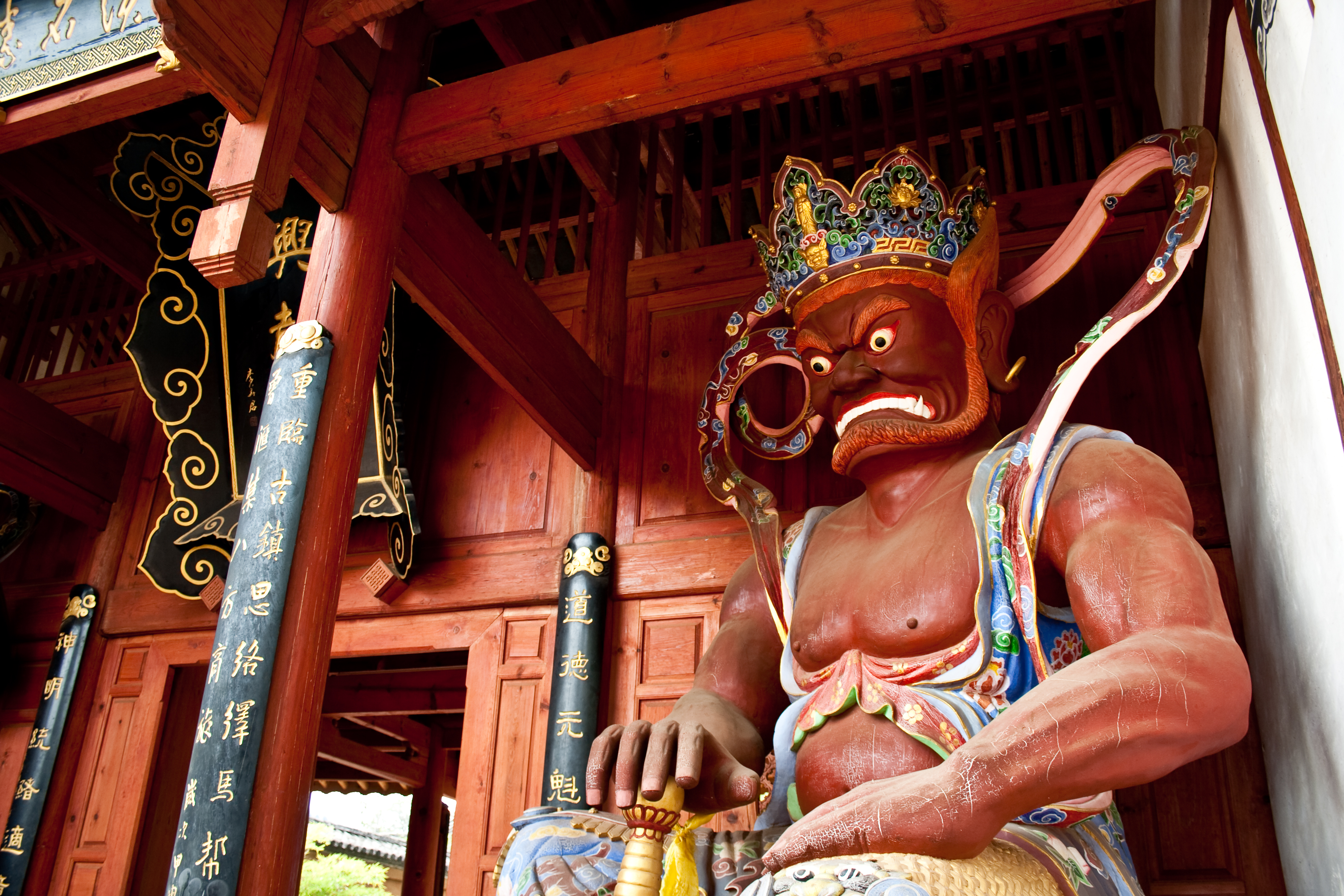
Xinjiao Temple in Shaxi

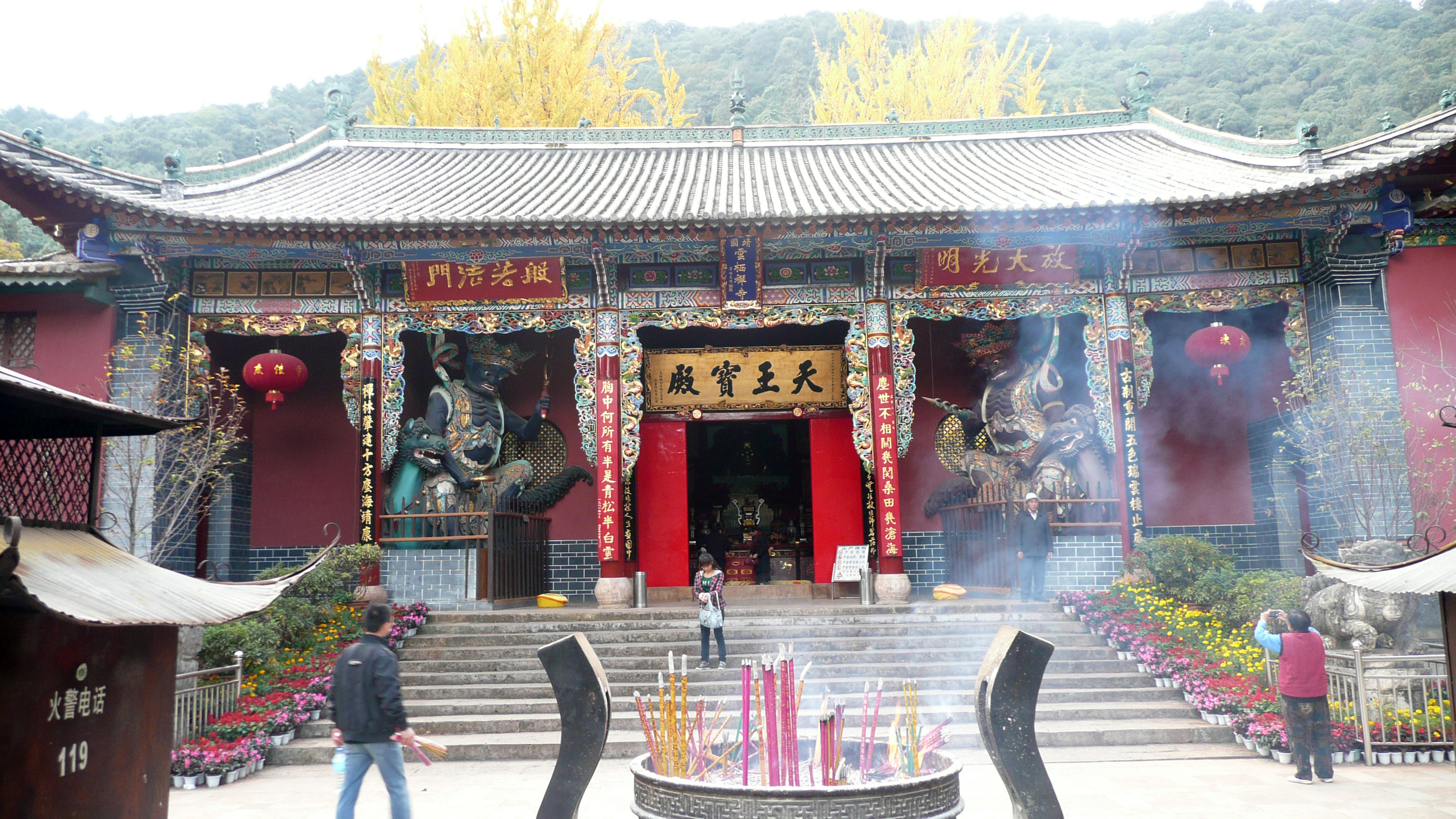
Huating Buddhist Temple in the Western Mountains (Xishan) of Kunming

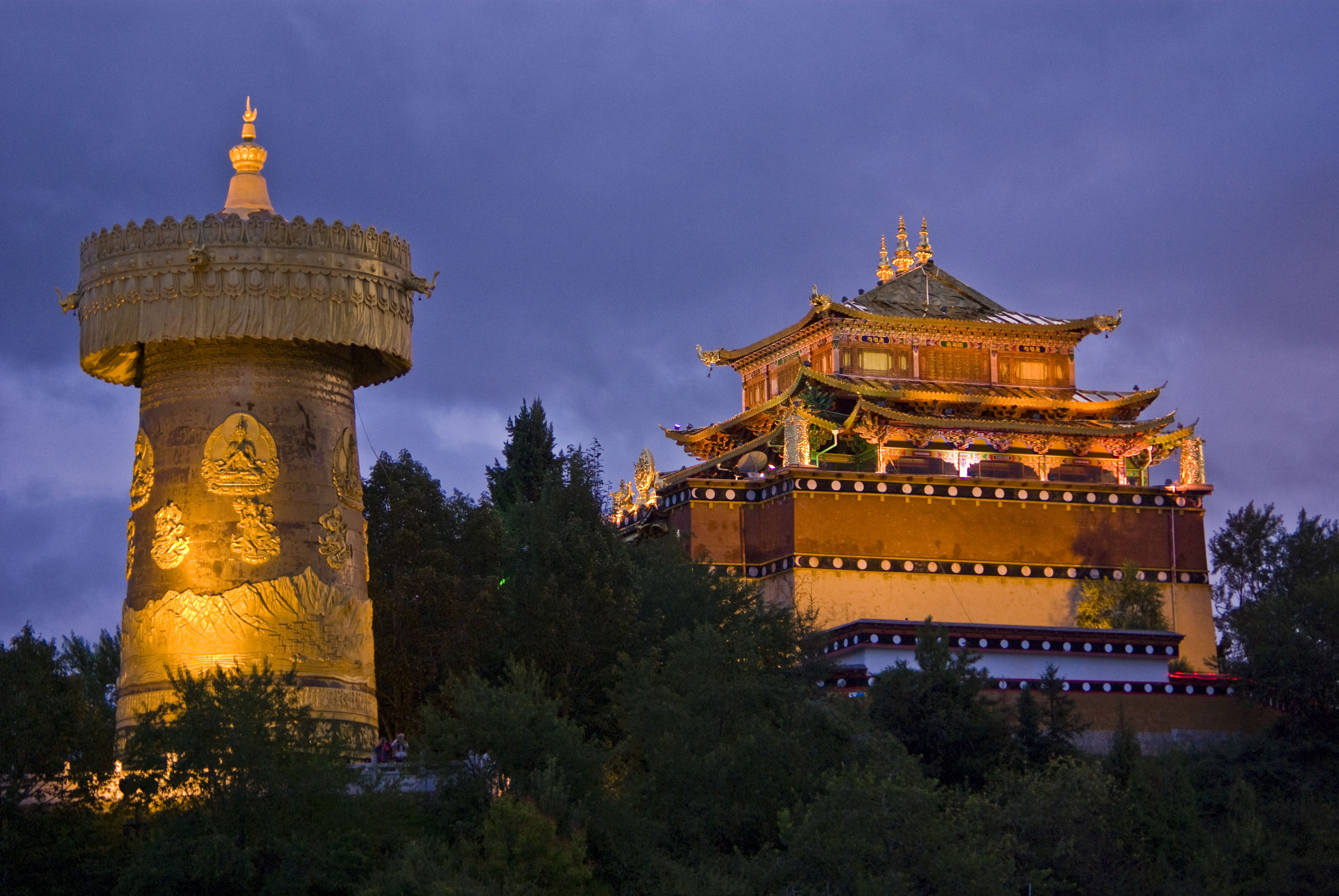
Guishan Buddhist Temple of the Tibetan tradition

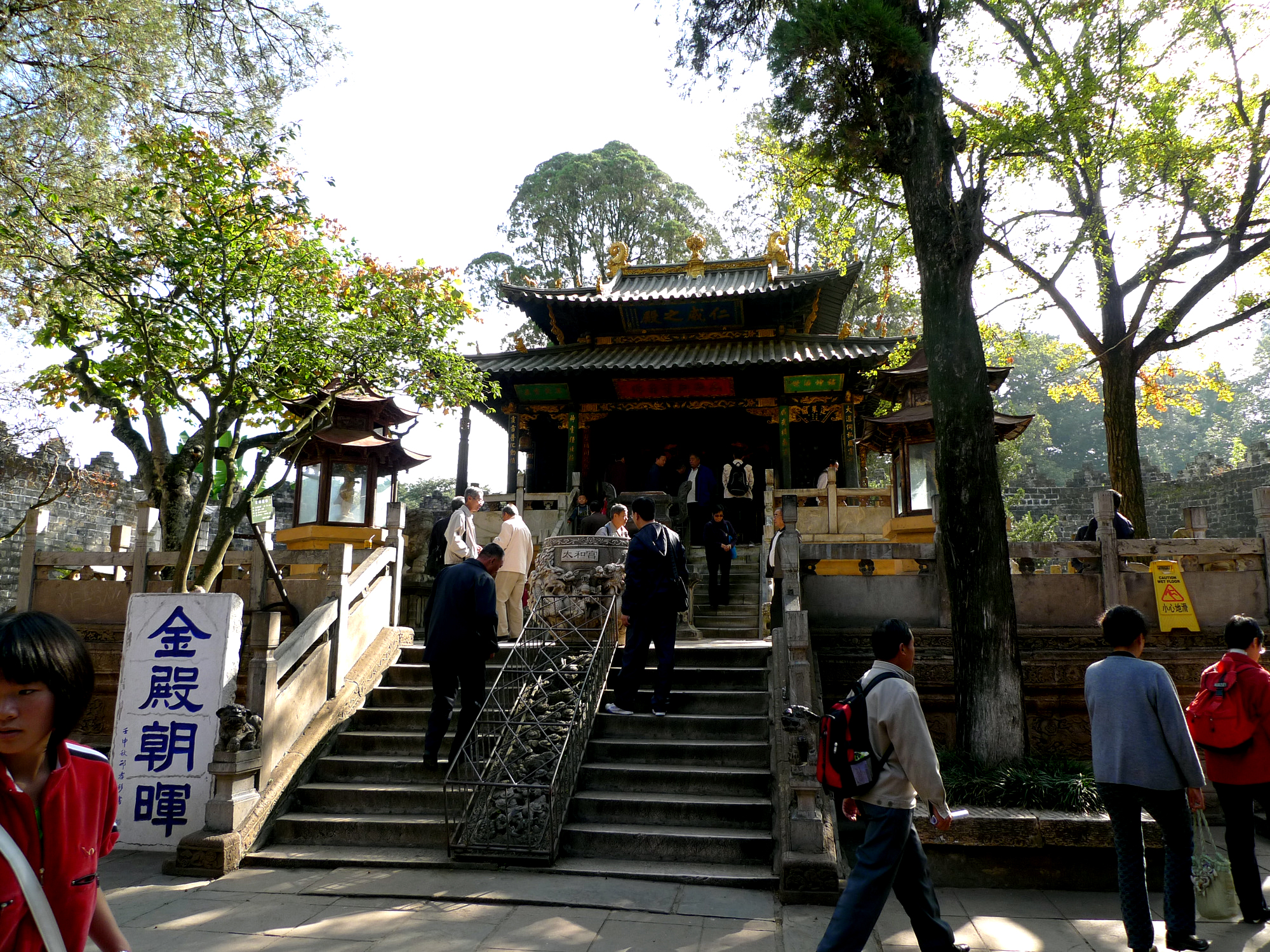
Hall of the Golden Taoist Temple in Kunming

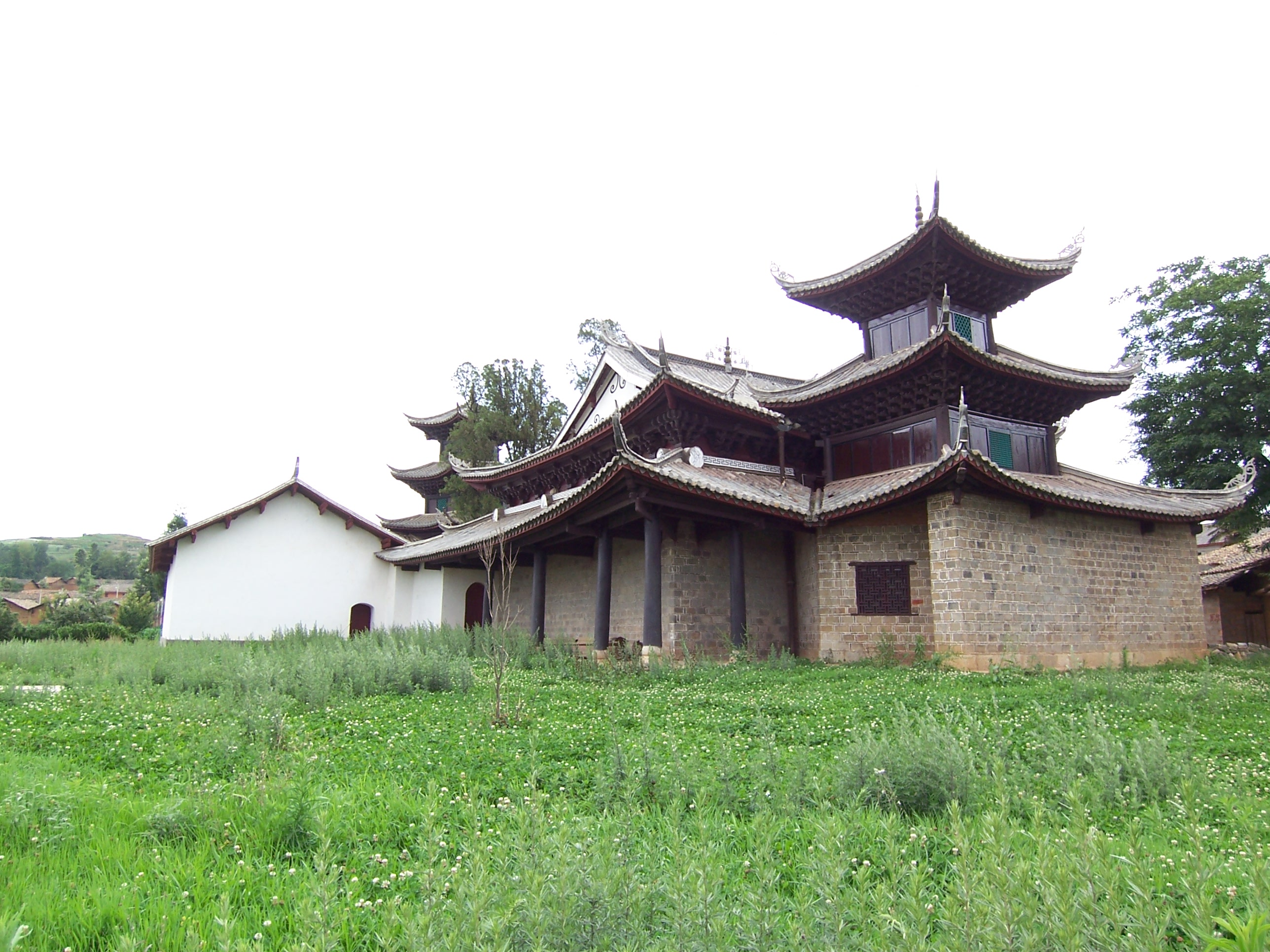
Tuogu Mosque in Ludian County

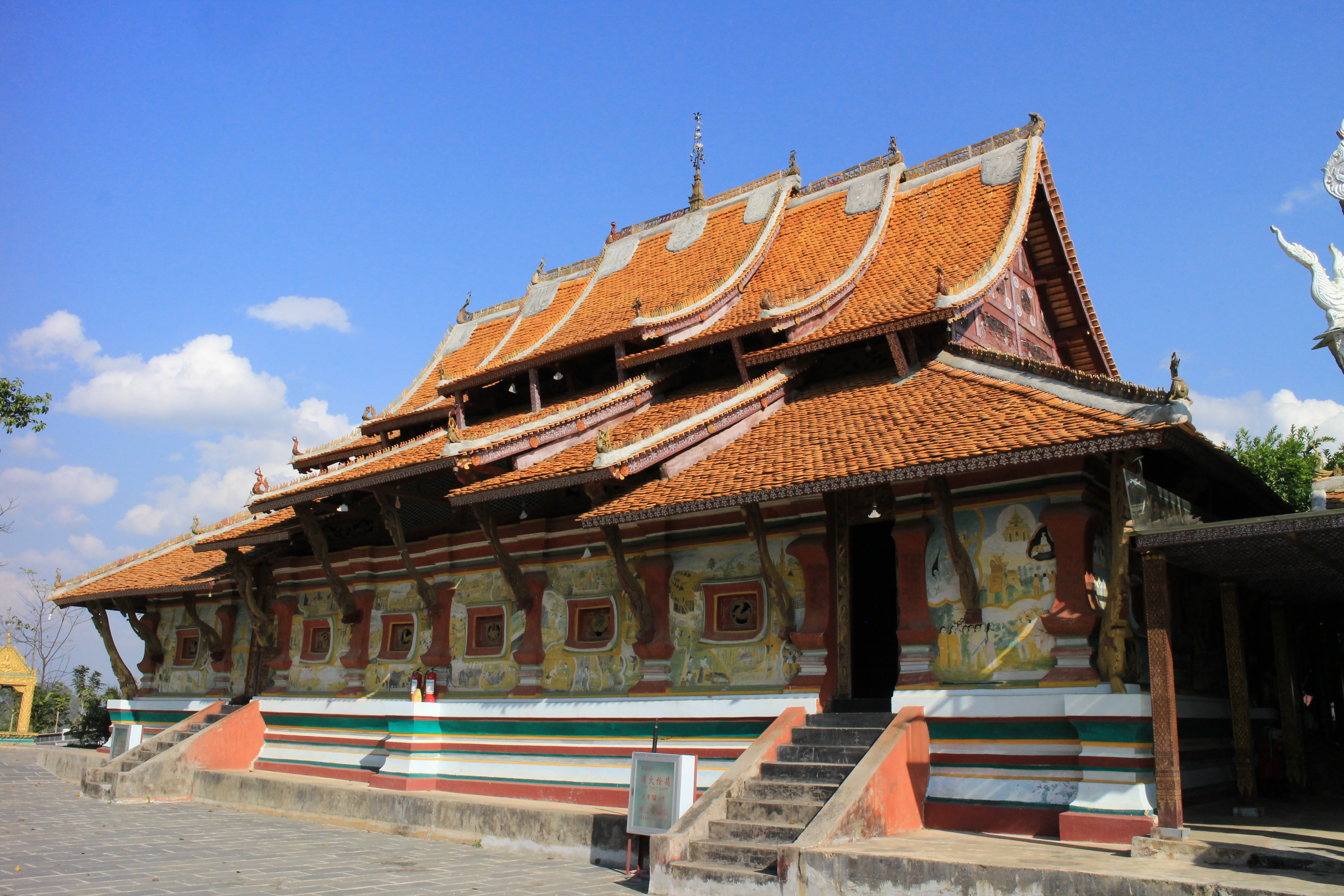
Dai Theravada Buddhist temple in Menghai County, Xishuangbanna

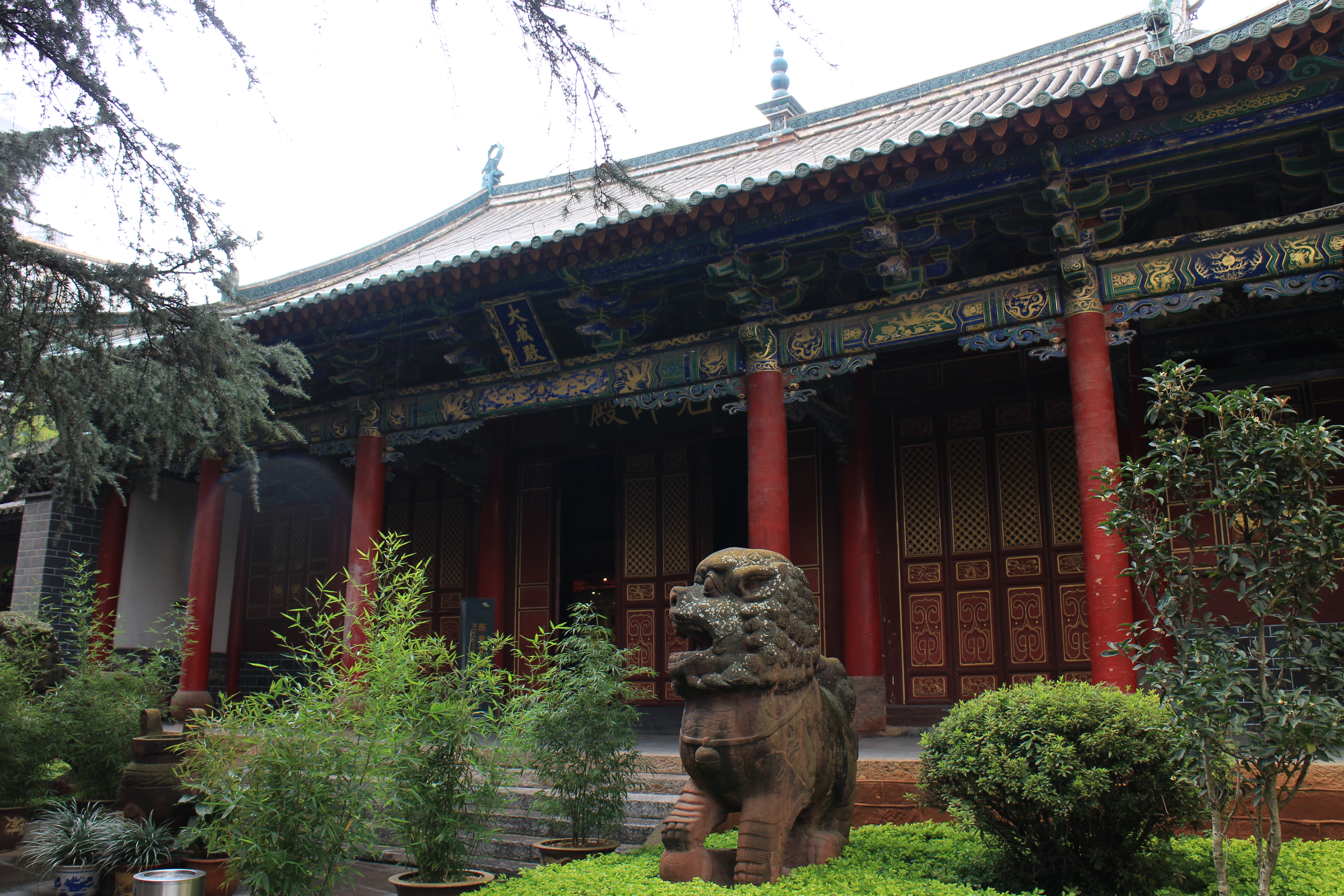
Anning Confucian Memorial

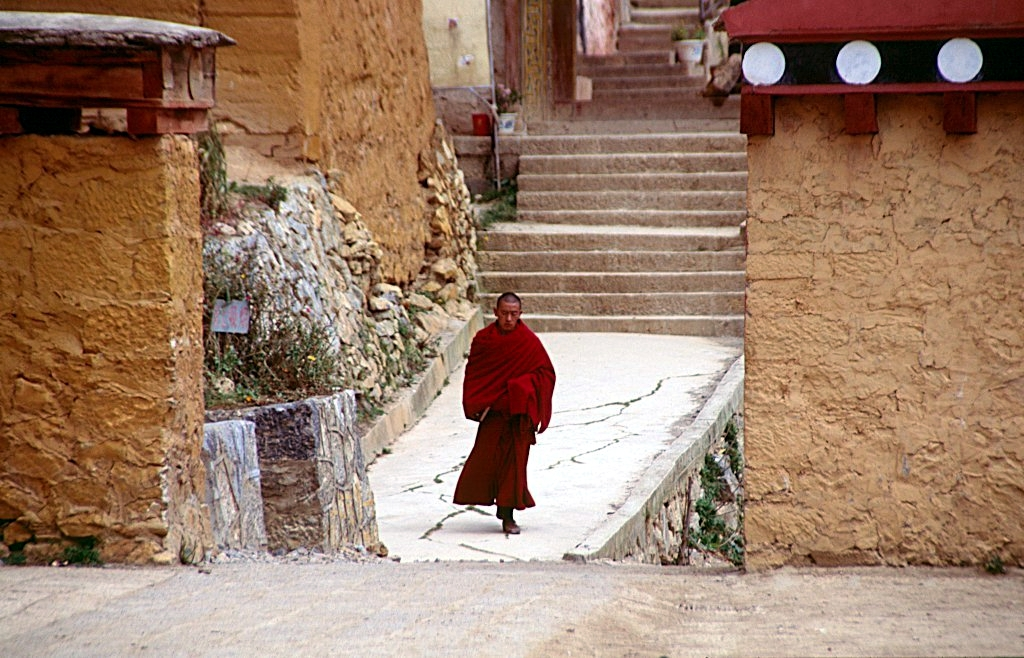
Zhongdian Sumzênling goinba

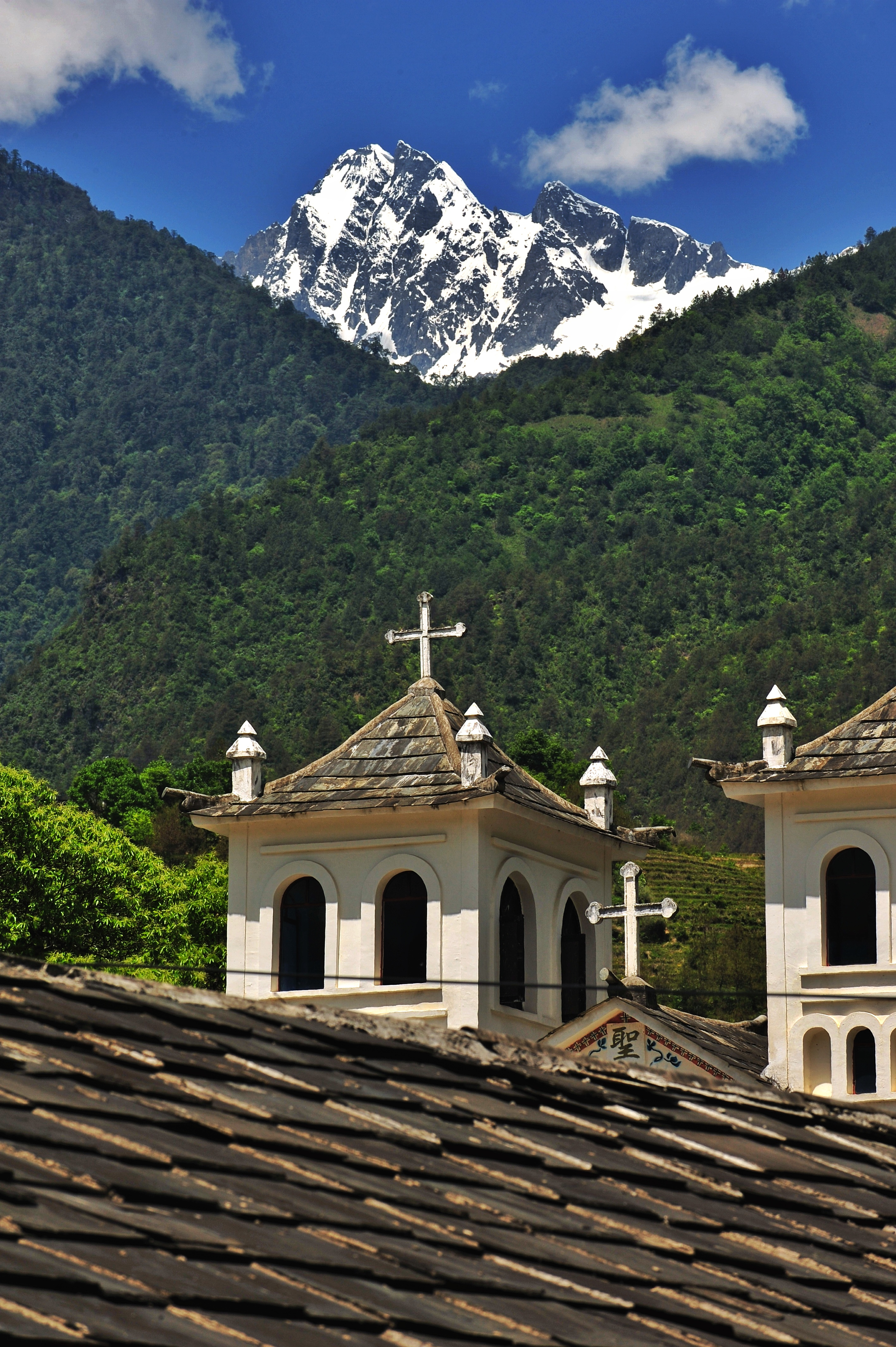
Zhongding Catholic Church, Bingzhongluo, Gongshan County

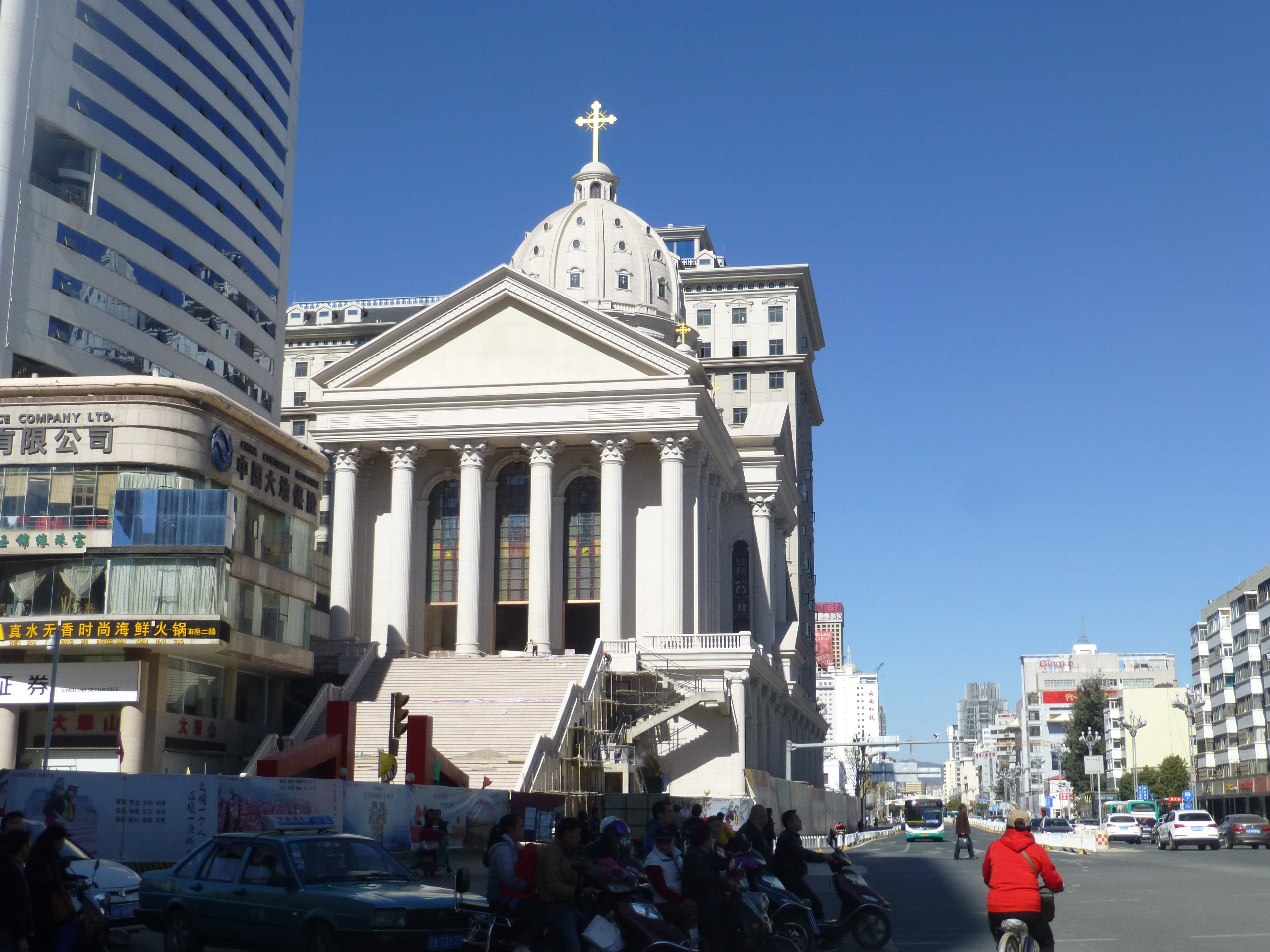
Cathedral of the Sacred Heart of Kunming

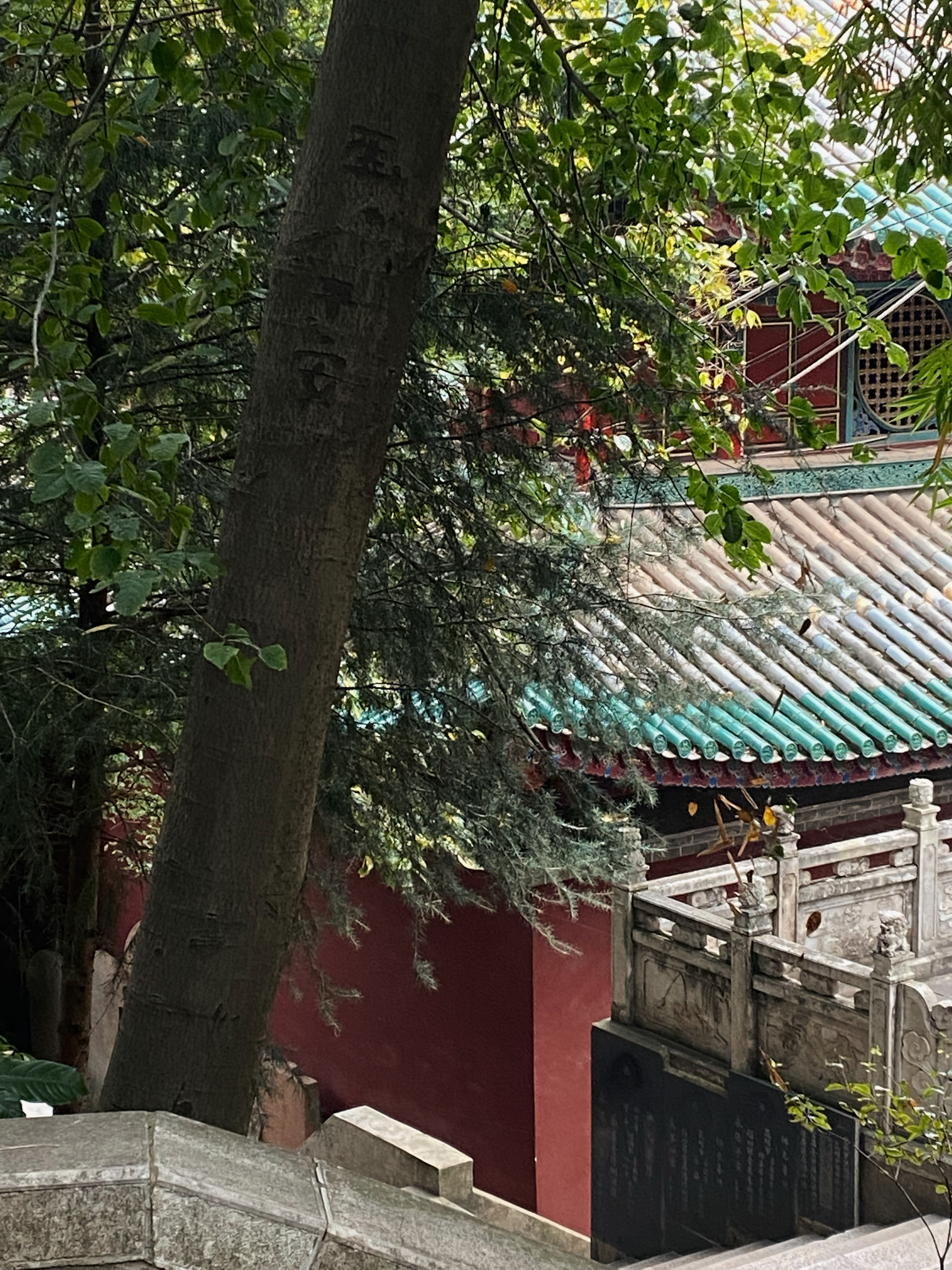
Panlong Temple in Kunming

== Agriculture ==
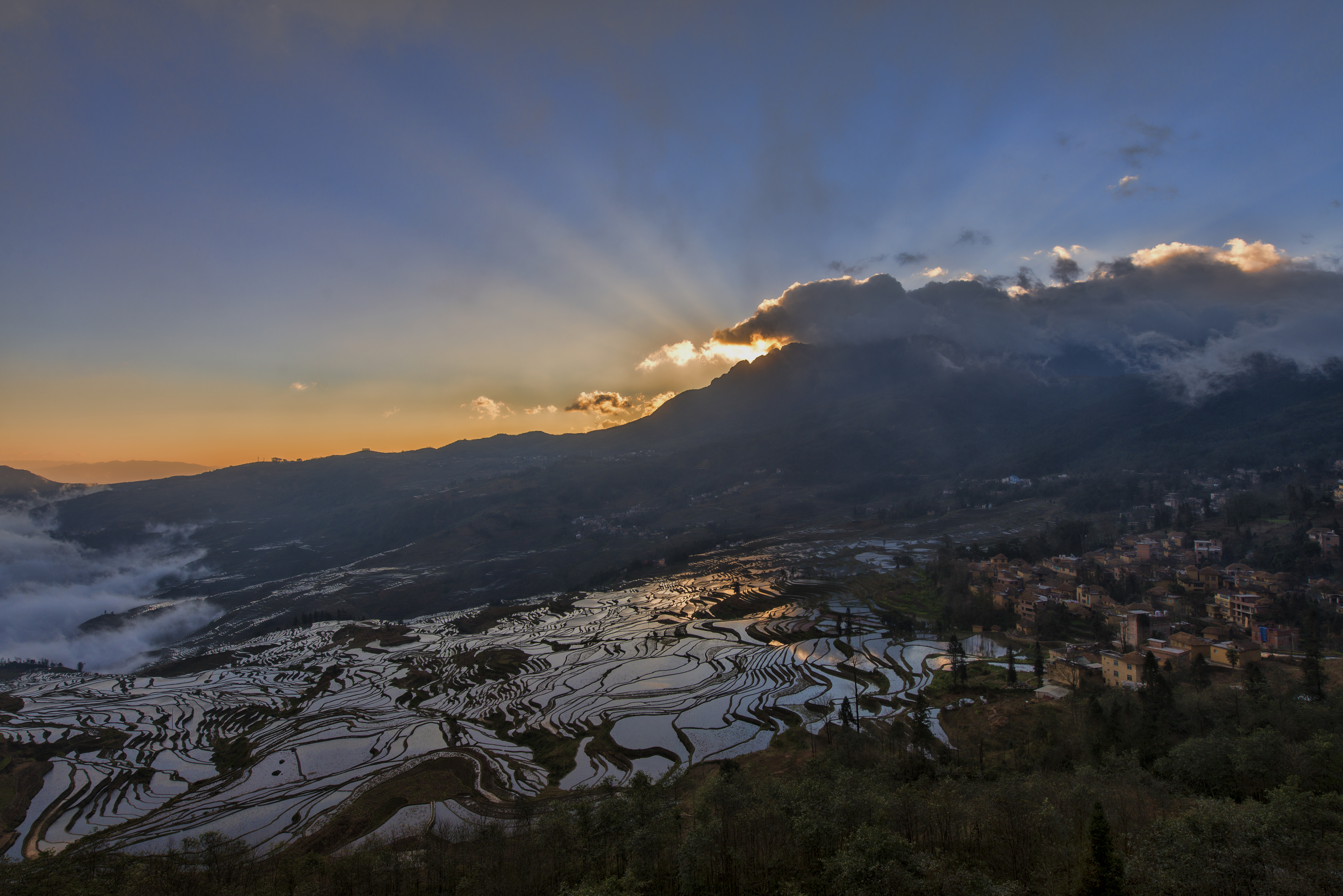
View of Duoyishu sunrise in Yuanyang

The region maintains a strong agricultural focus. Agriculture is restricted to the few upland plains, open valleys, and terraced hillsides. Level land for agriculture is extremely scarce and only about 5 percent of the province is under cultivation. Rice is the main crop; corn, barley, wheat, rapeseed, sweet potatoes, soybeans (as a food crop), tea, sugarcane, tobacco, and cotton are also grown. On the steep slopes in the west livestock is raised and timber, a valuable resource, is cut (teak in the southwest).

Yunnan produces most of coffee grown in China (although there are also much smaller plantations in Fujian and Hainan). Large-scale coffee cultivation started in Yunnan in 1988. The most commonly-grown variety in the province is catimor.

Yunnan is famous for its quality teas. Most notably Yunnan tea. Yunnan black tea, also known as ‘Dianhong’ (‘Dian’ is the short name for Yunnan, ‘hong’ meaning red after the deep, red liquor of the brewed tea) is a fully oxidised tea grown high in the mountainous regions between approximately 1000 metres to 2000 metres above sea level. Its unique earthy flavour makes it a highly sought after tea.

Tobacco is the main (export) product and makes up a big part of the provincial GDP. Furthermore, Yunnan has a strong competitive potential in the fruit and vegetable industries, especially in low value-added commodities such as fresh and dried vegetables and fresh apples.

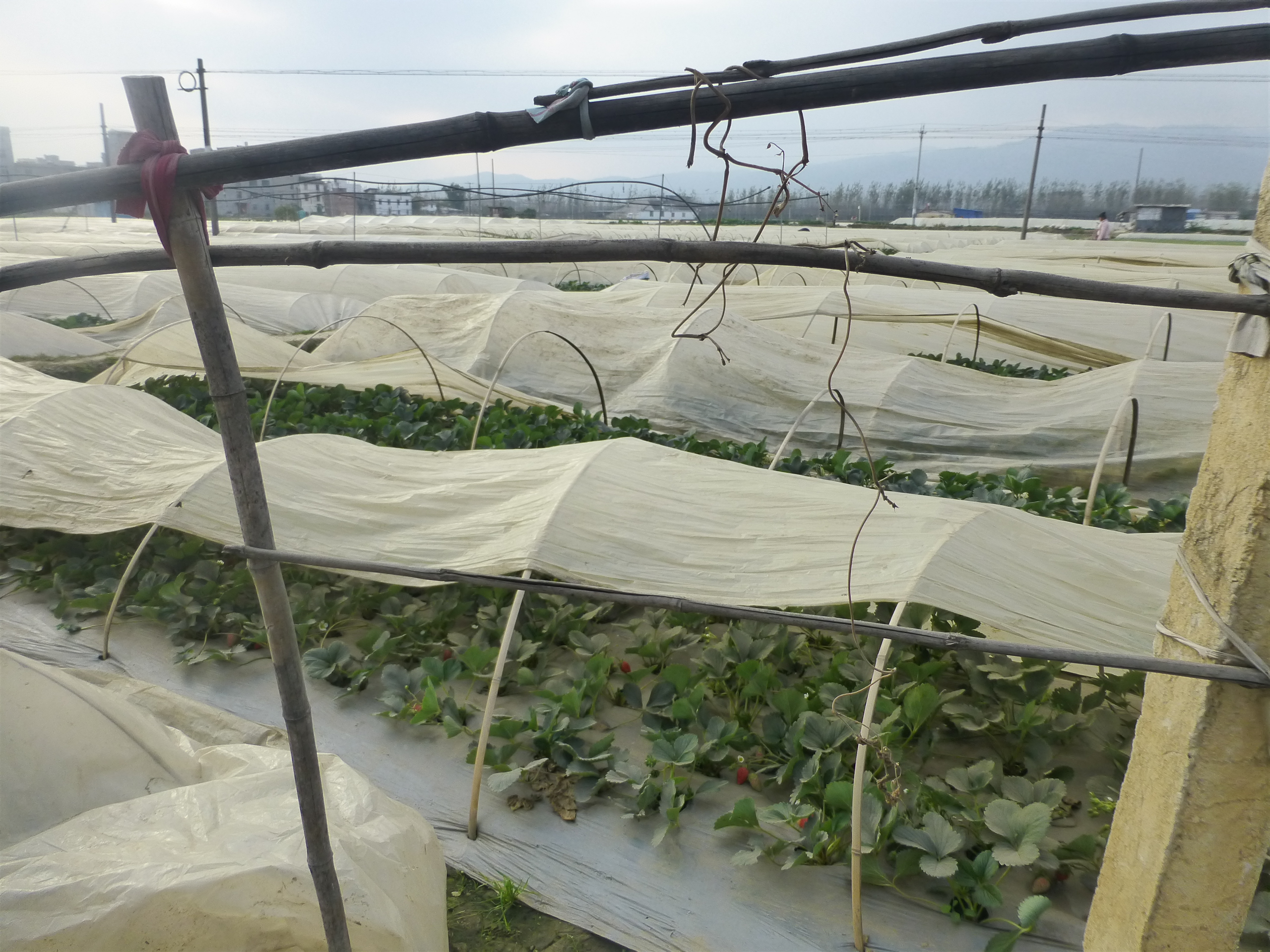
Strawberry fields near Yuxi

Yunnan is one of the regions in the world with the most abundant resources of wild edible mushrooms. In China, there are 938 kinds of edible mushrooms, over 800 varieties of which can be found in Yunnan. In 2004, around 7,744 tons of wild edible mushrooms were exported, making up for 70% of the total export of the product in China. The so-called "pine mushroom "is the main product in Yunnan and is exported to Japan in large quantities.

China's growing consumption of dairy products has also caused Yunnan's dairy industry also to be developing very rapidly. Yunnan is also aiming to export to its ASEAN neighbors.

The flower industry in Yunnan started to develop towards the end of the 1980s. Yunnan accounts for 50% of China's total cut flower production. The size of the planting area for cut flowers in Yunnan amounts to 4000 hectares. In 2003, the output totaled 2.3 billion stems. In 2002 the flower industry in Yunnan had a total output of RMB 3.4 billion. Export amounted to US$18 million. Apart from sales on the domestic market, Yunnan also exports to a number of foreign countries and regions such as Japan, Korea, Hong Kong, Thailand and Singapore. According to state media, the Dounan Flower Market in Kunming supplies the majority of fresh-cut flowers in China, and is the largest flower trading market of its kind in Asia.

== Economy ==
As of the mid-19th century, Yunnan exported birds, brass, tin, gemstones, musk, nuts, and peacock feathers mainly to stores in Guangzhou. They imported silk, wool, cotton cloth, tobacco, and books.

It was a major recipient of China's investment in industrial capacity during the Third Front campaign.

Shops in Lijiang Old Town, a popular tourist destination

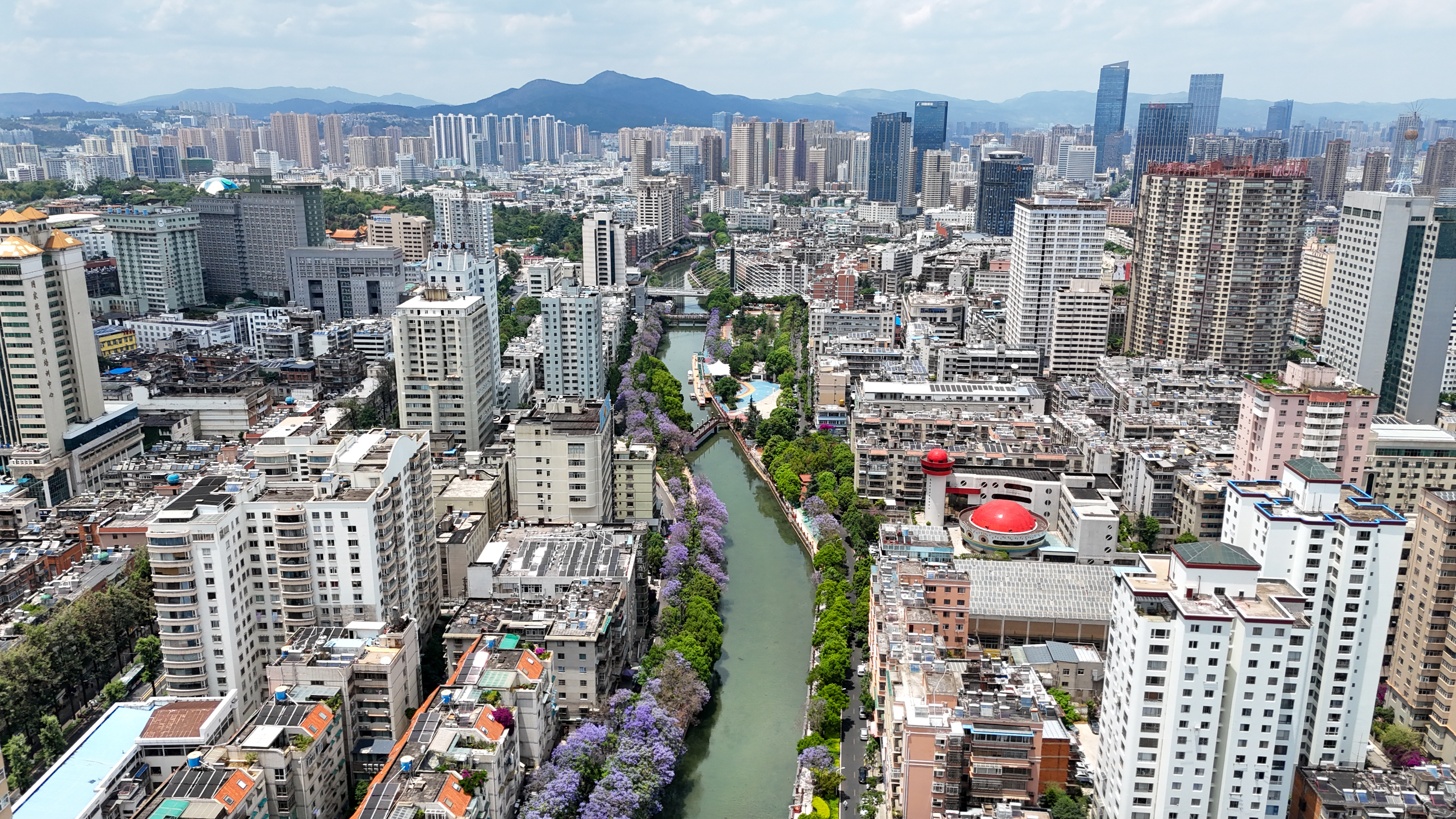
Aerial view of Downtown Kunming

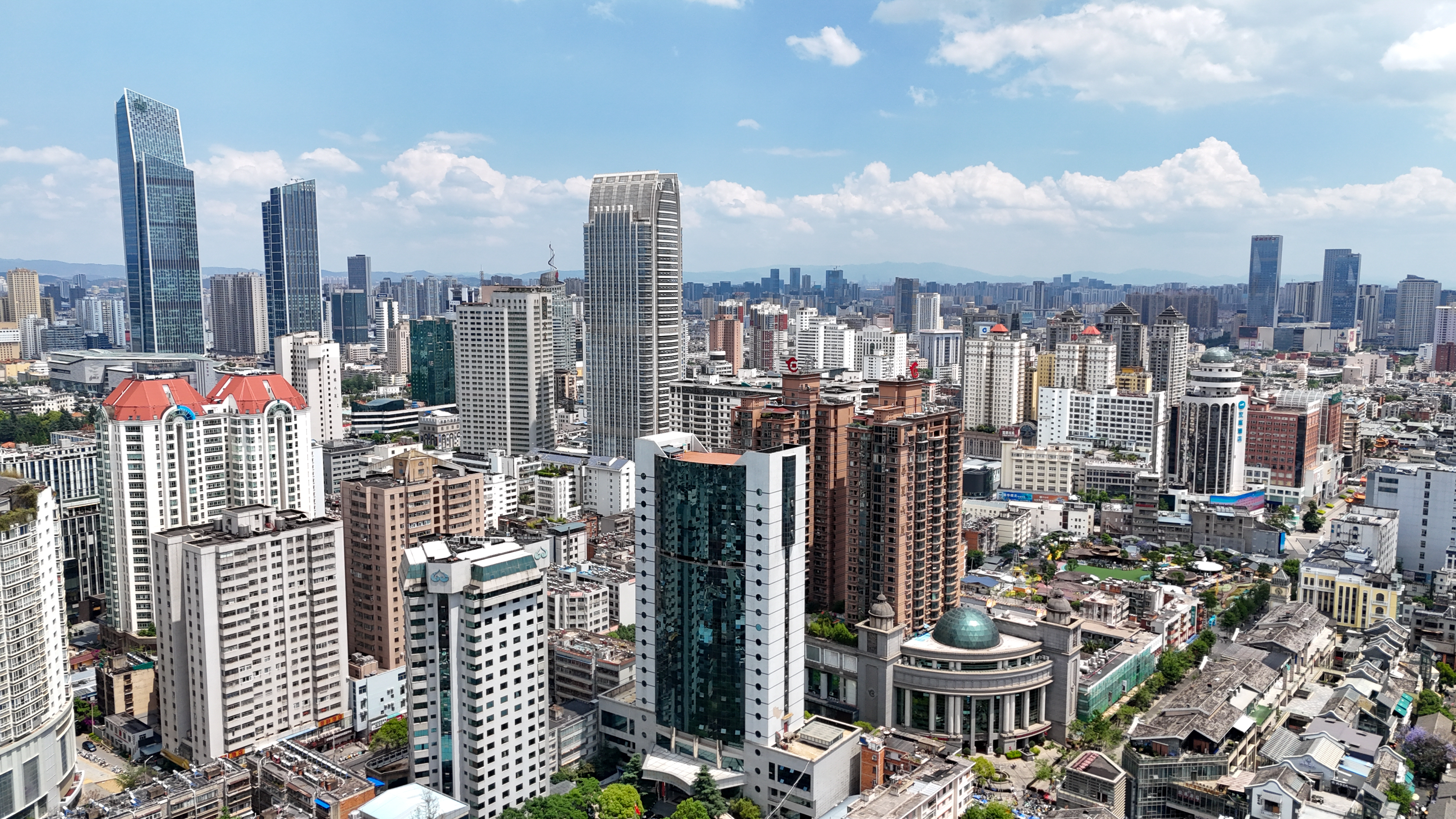
Aerial view of Downtown Kunming

Yunnan is one of China's relatively undeveloped provinces with more poverty-stricken counties than the other provinces. In 1994, about 7 million people lived below the poverty line of less than an annual average income of 300 yuan per capita. They were distributed in the province's 73 counties mainly and financially supported by the central government. With an input of 3.15 billion yuan in 2002, the absolutely poor rural population in the province has been reduced from 4.05 million in 2000 to 2.86 million. The poverty alleviation plan includes five large projects aimed at improving infrastructure facilities. They involve planned attempts at soil improvement, water conservation, electric power, roads, and building a "green belt." Upon the completion of the projects, the province hopes that will alleviate the shortages of grain, water, electric power and roads.

Yunnan lags behind the east coast of China in relation to socio-economic development. However, because of its geographic location the province has comparative advantages in regional and border trade with Southeast Asian countries. The Lancang River (upper reaches of Mekong River) is the waterway to southeast Asia. In recent years land transportation has been improved to strengthen economic and trade co-operation among countries in the Greater Mekong Subregion. Yunnan's abundance in resources determines that the province's pillar industries are: agriculture, tobacco, mining, hydro-electric power, and tourism. In general, the province still depends on the natural resources. The secondary sector is currently the largest industrial tier in Yunnan, contributing more than 45 percent of GDP. The tertiary sector contributes 40 percent and agriculture 15 percent. Investment is the key driver of Yunnan's economic growth, especially in construction.

The main challenge that Yunnan faces is its lack of major development. Its low productivity and competitiveness restrict the rapid development of the province. The province also faces great challenges in social issues such as environmental protection, poverty elimination, illegal migration, drug trafficking and HIV/AIDS.

Yunnan's four pillar industries include tobacco, agriculture/biology, mining, and tourism. The main manufacturing industries are iron and steel production and copper-smelting, commercial vehicles, chemicals, fertilizers, textiles, and optical instruments. Yunnan has trade contacts with more than seventy countries and regions in the world. Yunnan established the Muse border trade zone (located in Ruili) along its border with Burma. Yunnan mainly exports tobacco, machinery and electrical equipment, chemical and agricultural products, and non-ferrous metals. In 2008, its total two-way trade (imports and exports) reached US$9.6 billion. The province signed foreign direct investment contracts involving US$1.69 billion, of which US$777 million was actually used during the year.

Yunnan's employment rate remains stable. The total number of newly entered-employee were 49,350,000 people. The unemployment rate at the end of 2020 was 3.92%. Yunnan's nominal GDP in 2020 was 24521.9 billion yuan (US$3850.92 billion (???)), an annual growth rate of 4.0%. Its per capita GDP was 50,299 yuan (US$7,898.96). The share of GDP of Yunnan's primary, secondary and tertiary industries were 3598.91 billion yuan, 8287.54 billion yuan, and 12635.45 billion yuan, respectively.

Yunnan is one of the major production bases of copper, lead, zinc, tin and aluminum in China. Gejiu is well known as "the Kingdom of Zinc" with the reserves ranked first in the country. The Yunxi brand refined tin is one of the main products in Gejiu, which is registered on the London Metal Exchange (LME). Besides, reserves of germanium, indium, zirconium, platinum, rock salt, sylvite, nickel, phosphate, mirabilite, arsenic and blue asbestos are also high. Significant copper deposits are found at Dongchuan, iron ore at Wuding, and coal at Xuanwei and Kaiyuan. Economic policy to locate new industry in interior areas with substantial mineral wealth, led to major industrial development in Yunnan, especially in the Kunming area.

The electricity industry is another important economic pillar of Yunnan, which plays a key role in the West-East Electricity Transmission Project. The electricity produced in Yunnan is mainly transported to Guangdong.

=== Economic and Technological Development Zones ===
- Kunming Economic and Technological Development Zone, first established in 1992, is a national-level zone approved by the State Council. Kunming is located in east-central Yunnan with preferential location. After several years of development, the zone has formed its pillar industries, which include tobacco processing, machinery manufacturing, electronic information, and biotechnology.
- The Kunming High-tech Industrial Development Zone (KMHNZ), is a state-level high-tech industrial zone established in 1992 in Northwest Kunming. It is administratively under Kunming Prefecture. It has covers an area of 9 km^{2} (3.5 sq mi). KMHNZ is located in the northwest part of Kunming city, 4 kilometers from Kunming Railway Station, 5 kilometers from Kunming International Airport.
- Kunming Dianchi Tourism and Vacation Zone
- Kunming Airport Economic Zone
- Ruili Border Trade Economic Cooperation Zone (RLBECZ): a Chinese State Council-approved Industrial Park based in Ruili, Dehong Prefecture, founded in 1992 to promote trade between China and Burma. The area's import and export trade include the processing industry, local agriculture and biological resources are very promising. Sino-Burmese business is growing fast. Burma is now one of Yunnan's biggest foreign trade partners. In 1999, Sino-Burmese trade accounted for 77.4% of Yunnan's foreign trade. In the same year, exports for electromechanical equipments came up to US$55.28 million. Main exports here include fiber cloth, cotton yarn, ceresin wax, mechanical equipments, fruits, rice seeds, fiber yarn and tobacco.
- Wanding Border Economic Cooperation Zone (WTBECZ): a Chinese State Council-approved Industrial Park based in Wanding Town, Ruili, Dehong, founded in 1992 to promote trade between China and Burma. The zone spans 6 km^{2} (2.3 sq mi) and is focused on developing trading, processing, agriculture resources and tourism.
- Qujing Economic and Technological Development Zone (QETDZ): a provincial development zone approved by Yunnan Provincial Government in August 1992. It is located in the east of urban Qujing, the second largest city in Yunnan in terms of economic strengths. The location of the development zone is the economic, political and cultural center of Qujing. As an agency under Qujing municipal Party committee and municipal government, the administrative commission of QETDZ functions as an economy supervising body at the prefecture level and an administration body at the county level. It has 106 km^{2} (41 sq mi) under its jurisdiction. A new 40-square-kilometer city area is planned to providing service for a population of 400,000 in the upcoming 10 years.
- Yuxi Economic and Technological Development Zone
- Dali Economic and Technological Development Zone
- Chuxiong Economic and Technological Development Zone covers an area of 12 km^{2} (4.6 sq mi), composed of four parks.
- Songming Yanglin Experimental Zone for County & Township Industries
- Hekou Border Economic Cooperation Zone: First established in 1992, the border zone was approved by the State Council to promote Sino-Vietnamese trade. It has a planned area of 4.02 km^{2} (1.55 sq mi). The zone implemented several policies to serve its clients in China from various industries and sectors including investment, trade, finance, taxation, immigration, etc.
- Jiegao Border Trade Economic Zone
- Lijiang Yulong Snow Mountain Tourism Zone
- Cang Mountain and Erhai Lake Tourism and Vacation Zone at Dali
- Xishuangbanna Tourism and Vacation Zone
- Tengchong Tourism and Vacation Zone
- Yangzonghai Lake Tourism and Vacation Zone
- Fuxian Lake Tourism and Vacation Zone

== Education ==
Since the 1960s, improvements have been achieved in the overall educational level, which can be seen in the increase in average years of regular education received. The development of part-time schools have brought adult, distance and continuing education to farms, factories, offices, and other places. Evening, time-off-work, and study-leave classes allow people to receive education without leaving their jobs. Policies to upgrade adult education have begun to complement the campaign against illiteracy. A basic Chinese vocabulary in simplified strokes is taught to millions of illiterate people in short, intensive courses. Despite the progress made, Yunnan's illiteracy rate remains one of the highest in China mainly because of insufficient education among minority peoples.

In higher education, Yunnan has one "National Key University," Yunnan University in Kunming, and a growing number of technical schools, the most prominent including the Yunnan Normal University, the Southwest Forestry University, Yunnan Agricultural University, Yunnan Academy of Agricultural Sciences, Kunming Medical University, Yunnan University of Traditional Chinese Medicine, and Kunming University of Science and Technology. Other notable establishments of learning are the Kunming branch of the Chinese Academy of Sciences, the Yunnan Astronomical Observatory, and the Yunnan Provincial Library. As of 2000, there were 24 institutions of higher learning in Yunnan, with an enrollment of over 90,400 students and a faculty of 9,237; 2,562 secondary schools with an enrollment of more than 2,137,400 students and 120,461 teachers; and 22,151 primary schools with an enrollment of 4,720,600 pupils and a faculty of 210,507. The gross enrollment rate of school-age children was 99.02%.

== Health ==
Yunnan is responsible for about 50% of officially reported malaria cases in China.

It is presently considered to be the main source of plague in China.

=== HIV-AIDS ===
The People's Republic of China's first reported AIDS case was identified in 1985 in a dying tourist. In 1989, the first indigenous cases were reported as an outbreak in 146 infected heroin users in Yunnan province, near China's southwest border.

Yunnan is the area most affected by HIV/AIDS in China. In 1989 first infections appeared among needle sharing drug users near the Burmese border. Up until 1993, the disease had remained a problem in the border areas before mobile people (truck drivers, construction and migrant workers and travelers) brought the virus further into the country. In 1995, the provinces of Sichuan and Xinjiang reported their first HIV cases, and by 1998, the virus had spread all over China.

== Transport ==
=== Railways ===
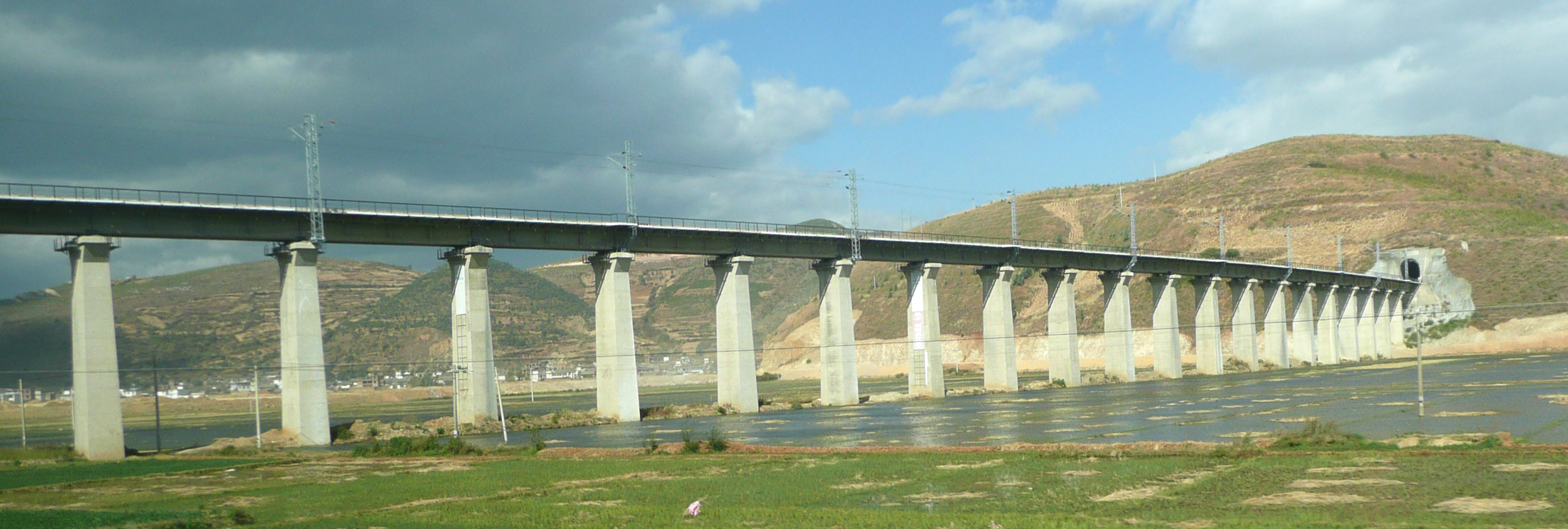
Viaduct of the Dali–Lijiang Railway near Dali

The first railway in Yunnan was the narrow gauge Yunnan–Vietnam Railway built by France from 1904 to 1910 to connect Kunming with Vietnam, then a French colony. The Chinese section spanned from Kunming to Hekou, entered Vietnamese territory at Lào Cai, and terminated at the seaport of Haiphong. During the Second World War, Britain began building a railway from Yunnan to Burma but abandoned the effort because of Japanese advance.

Due in part to difficult terrain both locally and in surrounding provinces and the shortage of capital for rail construction, Yunnan remained outside of China's domestic rail network until 1966 when the Guiyang–Kunming Railway was completed. The line would not enter into operation until 1970, the same year that the Chengdu-Kunming was completed. The Nanning–Kunming Railway to Guangxi was completed in 1997, followed by the Neijiang–Kunming Railway in 2001. The Panxi Railway, originally built in 1975 to draw coal from neighboring Guizhou, was electrified in 2001 and adds to eastern Yunnan's outbound rail transport capacity.

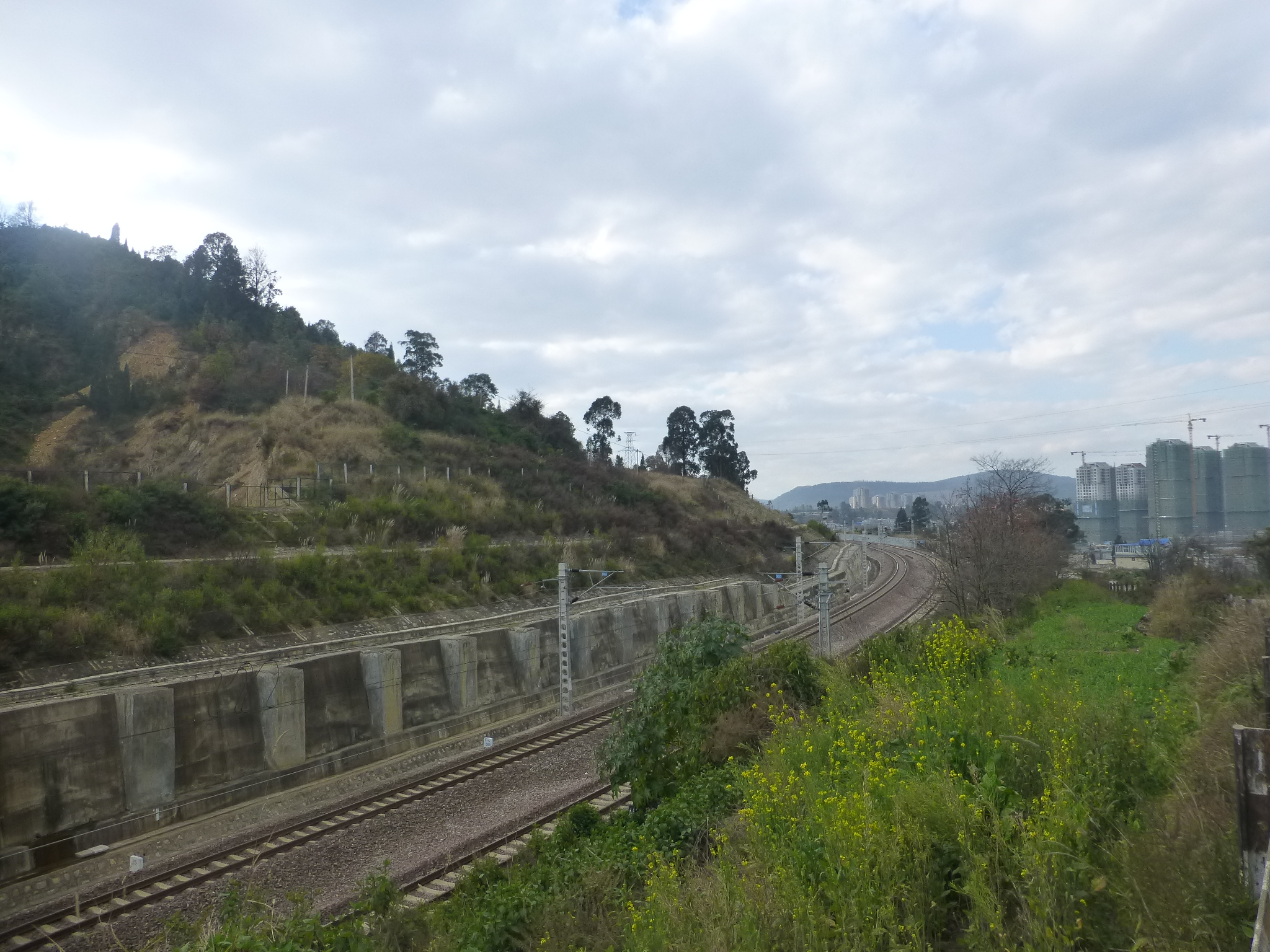
Kunming–Yuxi railway in Haikou Town, Kunming

Within the province, the Kunming–Yuxi, opened in 1993, and the Guangtong–Dali, opened in 1998, expanded the rail network to southern and western Yunnan, respectively. The Dali–Lijiang Railway, opened in 2010, brought rail service to northwestern Yunnan. That line is planned to be extended further north to Xamgyi'nyilha County.

The province is extending the railway network to neighboring countries in Southeast Asia. From Yuxi, the Yuxi–Mengzi Railway, built from 2005 to 2013, and the Mengzi–Hekou Railway, under construction since 2008, will form a standard gauge railway connection with Vietnam. The Dali–Ruili Railway, under construction since May 2011, will bring rail service to the border with Myanmar. Also under planning is a rail line from Yuxi to Mohan, in Xishuangbana Prefecture, on the border with Laos. The line could be extended farther south to Thailand, Malaysia, and Singapore.

=== Burma Road ===
The Burma Road was a highway extending about 1,100 km (680 mi) through mountainous terrain from Lashio, northeast Burma northeastward to Kunming, China. Undertaken by the Chinese after the start of the Sino-Japanese War in 1937 and completed in 1938, it was a vital transportation route for wartime supplies to the Chinese government from Rangoon and shipped by railroad to Lashio from 1938 to 1946. An extension runs east through China from Kunming, then north to Chongqing. The traffic increased in importance to China after the Japanese took effective control of the Chinese coast and of Indochina. It was seized by the Japanese in 1942 and reopened when it was connected to the Stilwell Road from India. Construction of the Ledo Road (later called the Stilwell Road) from Ledo, India, into Burma was begun in December 1942. In 1944, the Ledo Road reached Myitkyina and was joined to the Burma Road. Both roads have lost their former importance and are in a state of disrepair. The Burma Road's importance diminished after World War II, but it has remained a link in a 3,400 km road system from Yangon, Burma, to Chongqing.

=== Highways ===
Road construction in Yunnan continues unabated: over the last years the province has added more new roads than any other province. Today expressways link Kunming through Dali to Baoshan, Kunming to Mojiang (on the way to Jinghong), Kunming to Qujing, Kunming to Shilin (Stone Forest). The official plan is to connect all major towns and neighbouring capitals with expressways by 2010, and to complete a high-speed road network by 2020.

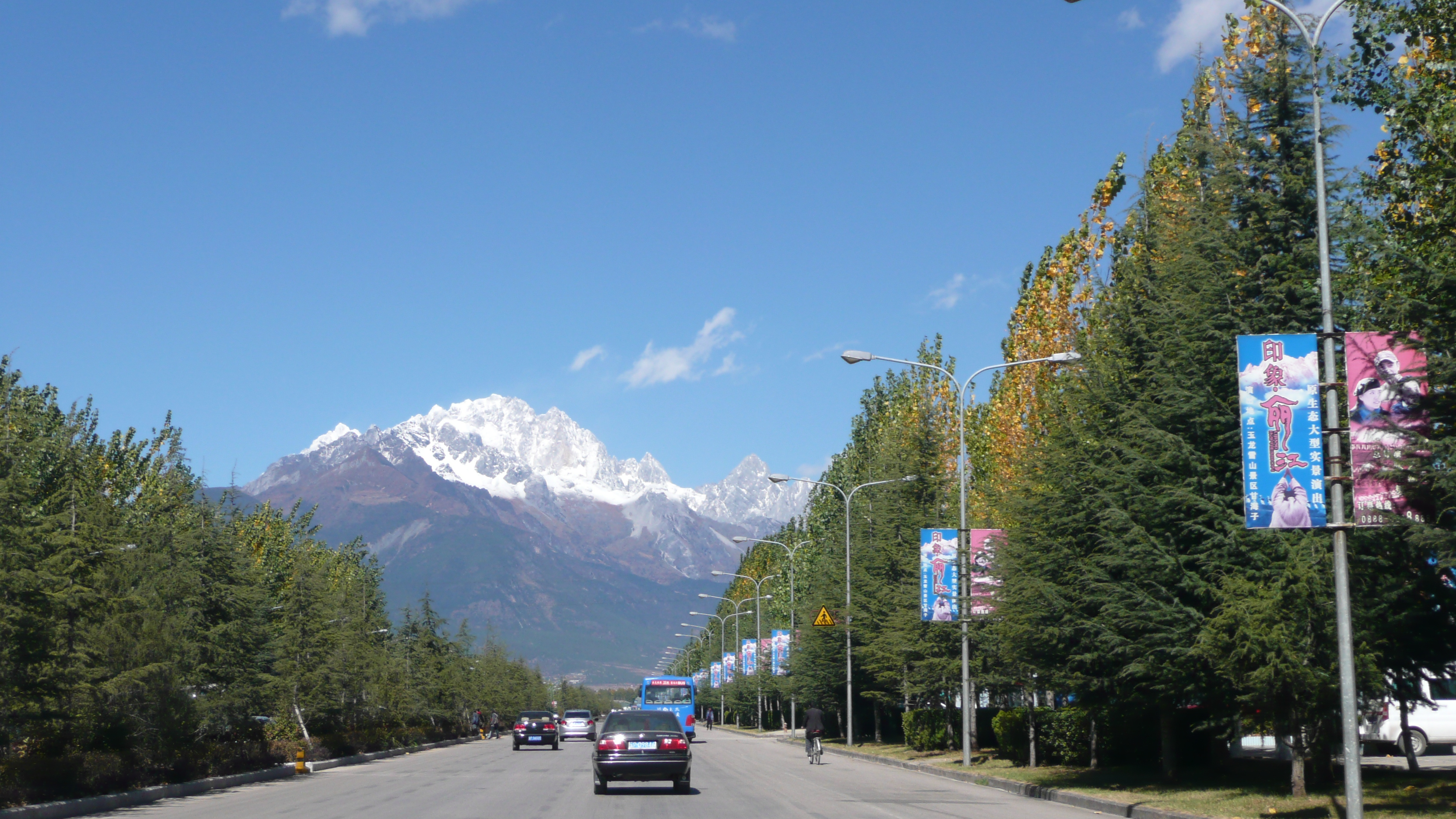
Roadway in Lijiang with the Jade Dragon Snow Mountain in the distance.

All county towns are now accessible by paved, all-weather roads from Kunming, all townships have a road connection (the last to be connected was Yangla, in the far north, but Dulongjiang remains cut off for about six months every year), and about half of all villages have road access.

Second-level national highways stretch 958 km (595 mi), third-level highways, 7,571 km (4,704 mi) and fourth-level highways, 52,248 km (32,465 mi). The province has formed a network of communication lines radiating from Kunming to Sichuan and Guizhou provinces and Guangxi and Tibet autonomous regions, and further on to Burma, Laos, Vietnam and Thailand.

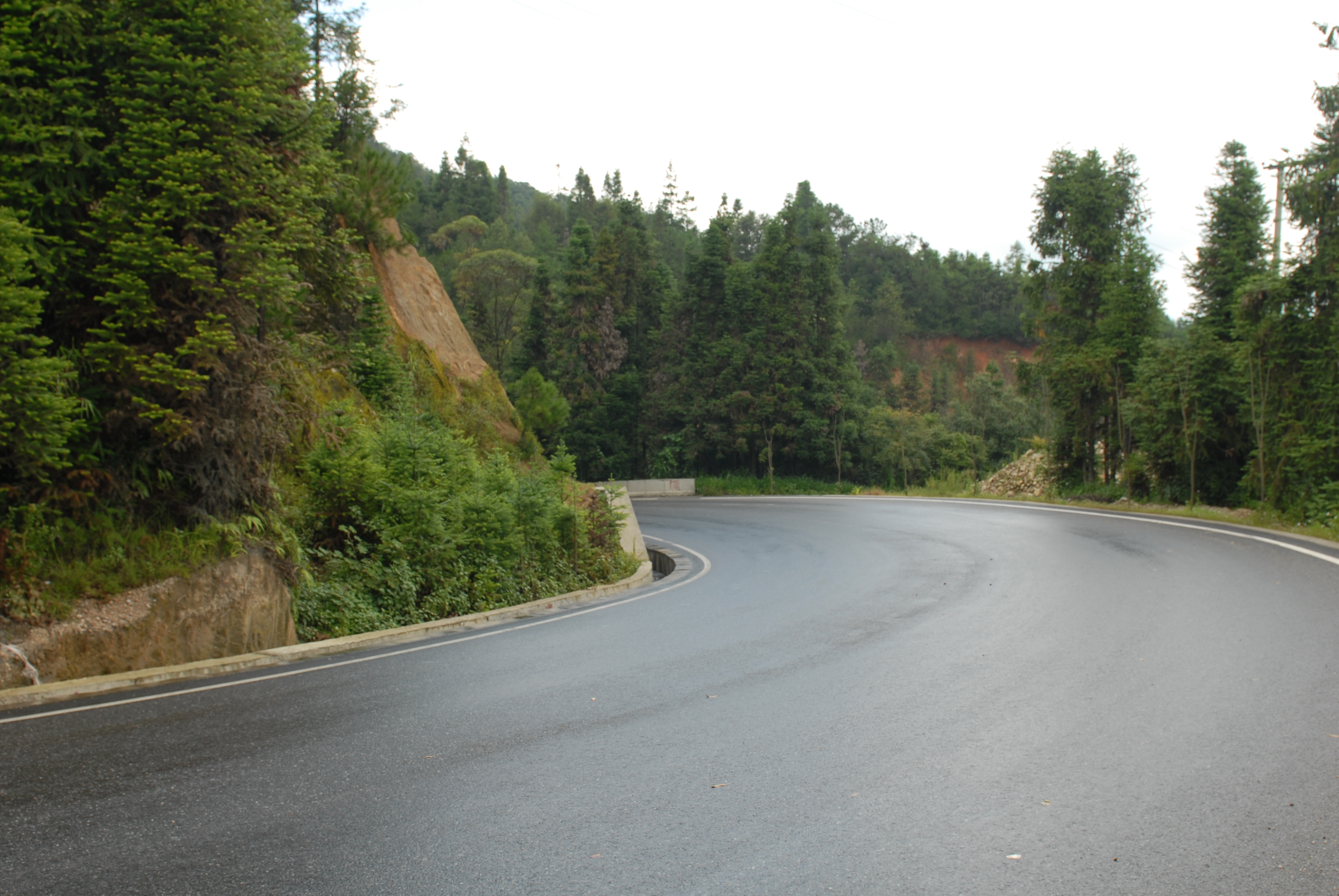
China National Highway 320 in Longling County

National highways running through Yunnan are:

- China National Highway 108
- China National Highway 213
- China National Highway 214
- China National Highway 320
- China National Highway 323
- China National Highway 324
- China National Highway 326

==== Expressways ====
After the opening of the Suolongsi to Pingyuanjie section, Luofu expressway, the first between Yunnan and Guangxi Province, opened in October 2007. It has made material and passenger transportation between the two provinces much more convenient. Moreover, Luofu Expressway has also become the main road from Yunnan to Guangxi and the coastal ports. Luofu Expressway begins from the crossroads of Luo Village between Yunnan and Guangxi Provinces and ends at Funing County of Wenshan State. The total length of the expressway is 79.3 km, which has shortened the commute between Yunnan and Guangxi from the previous three-and-a-half hours to just 50 minutes.

Expressways running through Yunnan are:

- Kunming–Bangkok Expressway (G8511 Kunmo Expressway)
- G5611 Dali Expressway from Dali to Lijiang
- G78 Shankun Expressway from Shantou to Kunming
- G80 Guangkun Expressway from Guangzhou to Kunming
- G8011 Kaihe Expressway from Kaiyuan to Hekou on the Vietnamese border

=== Waterways ===
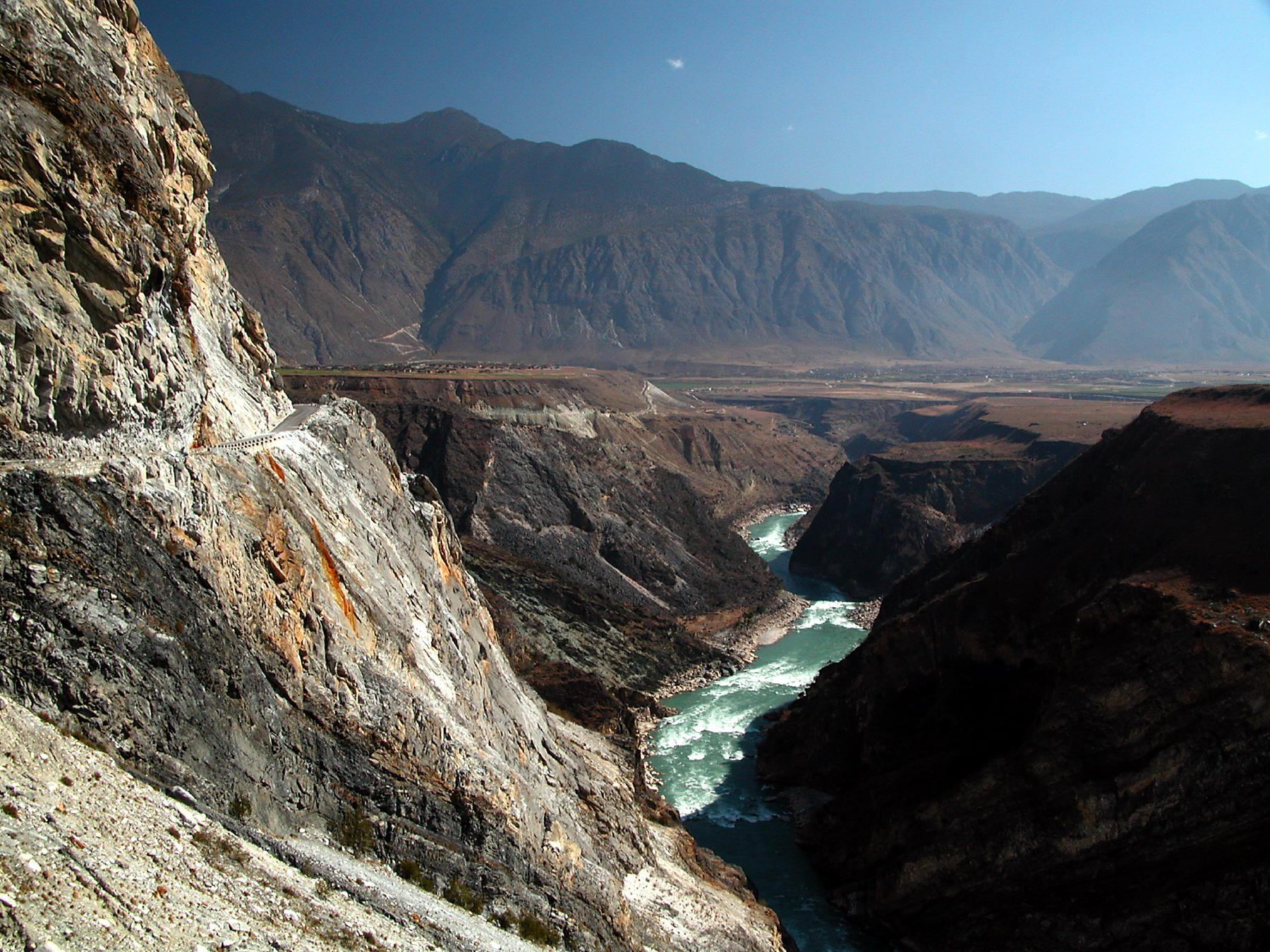
Yangzi River

Generally, rivers are obstacles to transport in Yunnan. Only very small parts of Yunnan's river systems are navigable. However, China is constructing a series of dams on the Mekong to develop it as a waterway and source of power; the first was completed at Manwan in 1993.

In 1995, the province put an investment of 171 million yuan to add another 807 km (501 mi) of navigation lines. It built two wharfs with an annual handling capacity of 300,000 to 400,000 tons each and four wharfs with an annual handling capacity of 100,000 tons each. The annual volume of goods transported was two million tons and that of passengers transported, two million.

=== Airports ===
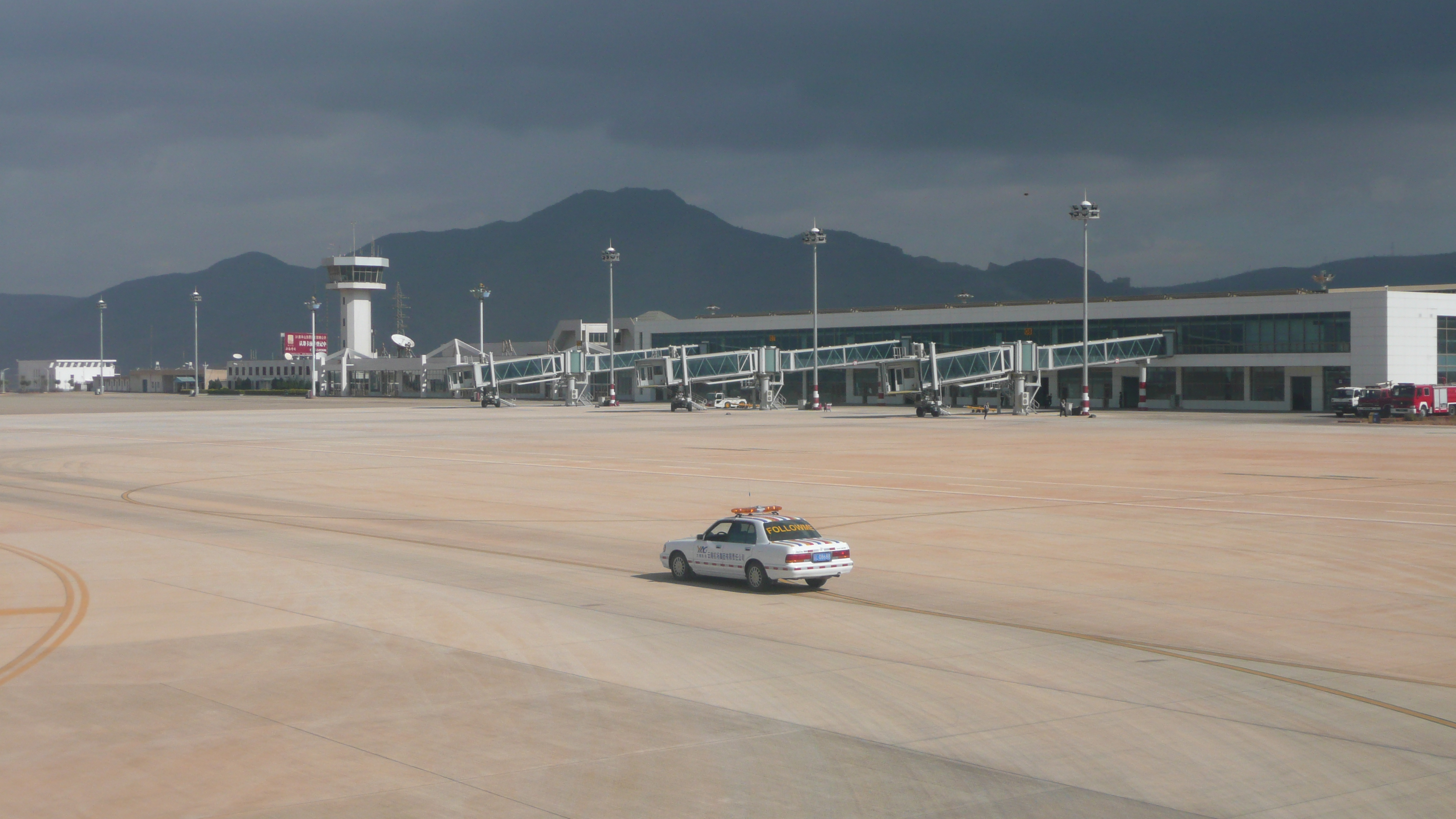
Dali Airport

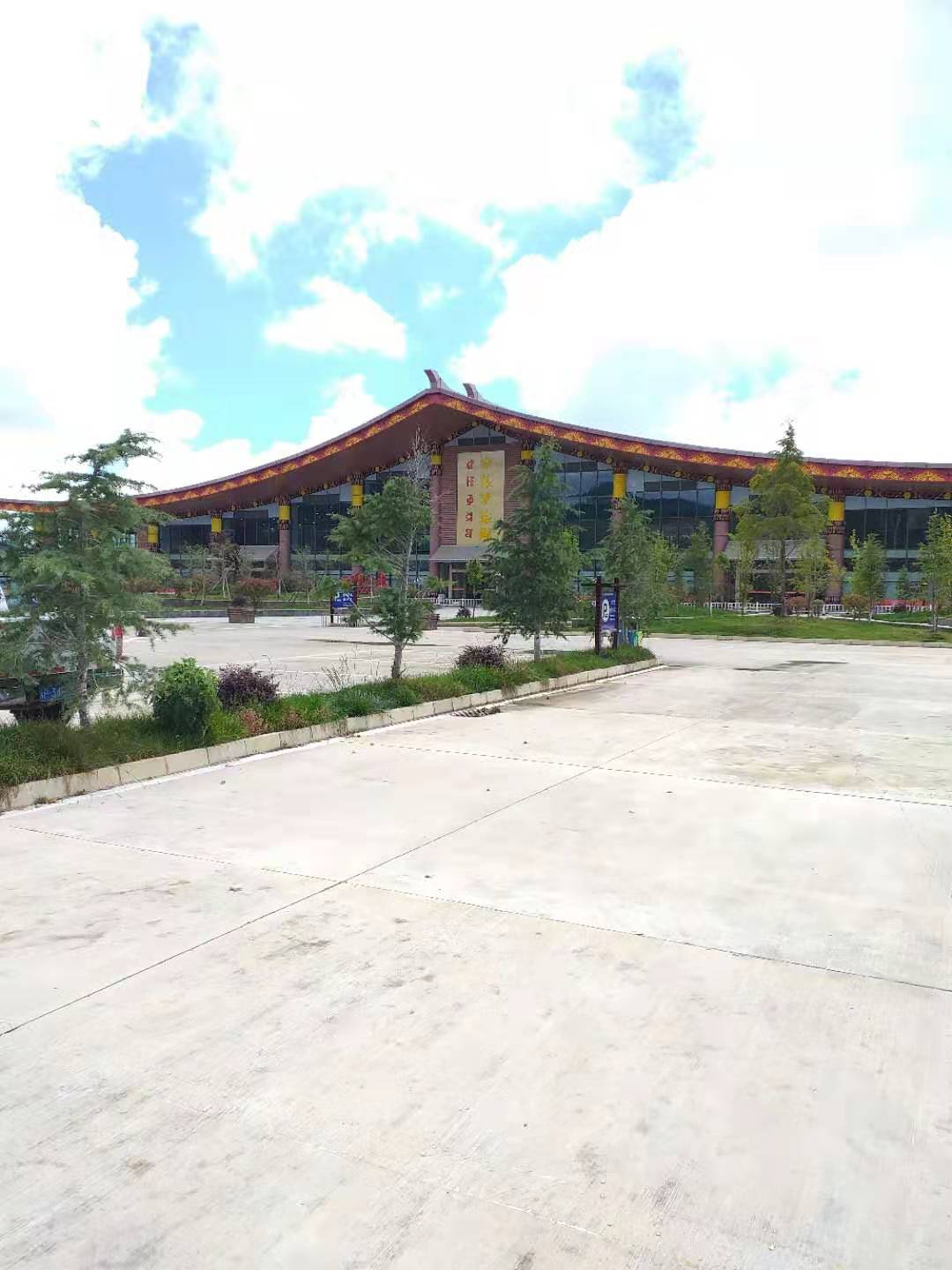
Ninglang Luguhu Airport

The province has twenty domestic air routes from Kunming to Beijing, Shanghai, Guangzhou, Chengdu, Haikou, Chongqing, Shenyang, Harbin, Wuhan, Xi'an, Lanzhou, Hangzhou, Xiamen, Nanning, Shenzhen, Guiyang, Changsha, Guilin, Lhasa and Hong Kong; eleven provincial air routes from Kunming to Jinghong, Mangshi, Lincang, Tengchong, Lijiang, Dali, Xamgyi'nyilha, Zhaotong, Baoshan, Simao, and Ninglang Luguhu; and ten international air routes from Kunming to Bangkok, Kolkata, Chiang Mai, Yangon, Singapore, Seoul, Hanoi, Ho Chi Minh City, Kuala Lumpur and Vientiane.

Replacing Kunming Wujiaba International Airport is Kunming Changshui International Airport, which opened June 28, 2012.

=== Bridges ===
Bridge-building in Yunnan date back at least 1,300 years when the Tibetan Empire built an iron chain bridge over the Yangtze to the neighboring Nanzhao Kingdom at what is today Weixi Lisu Autonomous County during the Tang dynasty. Iron chain bridges are still found across high river valleys of Yunnan. The Jinlong Bridge on the Jinsha River in Lijiang remains the oldest bridge over the Yangtze. With the expansion of the highway and railway network in Yunnan, numerous large-scale bridges have been built across the region's myriad of rivers, including the Yangtze, which has dozens of crossings in Yunnan.

=== Metro ===
Kunming is the only city in Yunnan that has a metro system. According to the Ministry of Transport, the Kunming Metro has six operational lines with a total length of 165.9 kilometers, and transported 23.244 million passengers in the month of February 2025.

== Culture ==
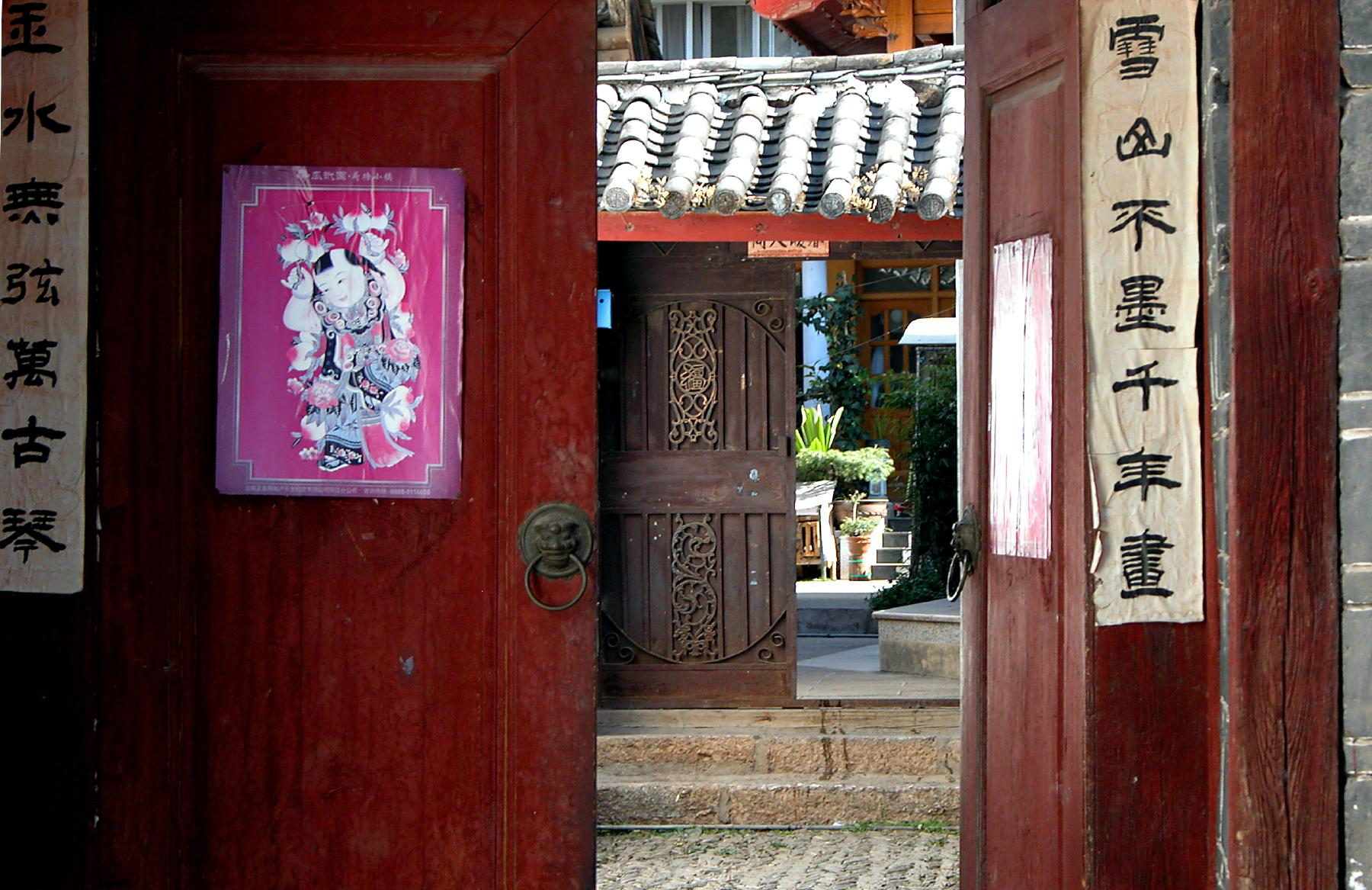
Hand-painted Chinese New Year's poetry pasted on the sides of doors leading to people's homes, Old Town, Lijiang.

Yunnan's cultural life is one of remarkable diversity. Archaeological findings have unearthed sacred burial structures holding elegant bronzes in Jinning, south of Kunming. In northeastern Yunnan, frescoes of the Jin dynasty (266–420) have been discovered in the city of Zhatong. Many Chinese cultural relics have been discovered in later periods. The lineage of tribal way of life of the indigenous peoples persisted uninfluenced by modernity until the mid-20th century. Tribal traditions, such as Yi slaveholding and Wa headhunting, have since been abolished. After the Cultural Revolution (1966–1976) in which several minority cultural and religious practices were suppressed, Yunnan has come to celebrate its cultural diversity and subsequently many local customs and festivals have flourished.

=== Tea ===
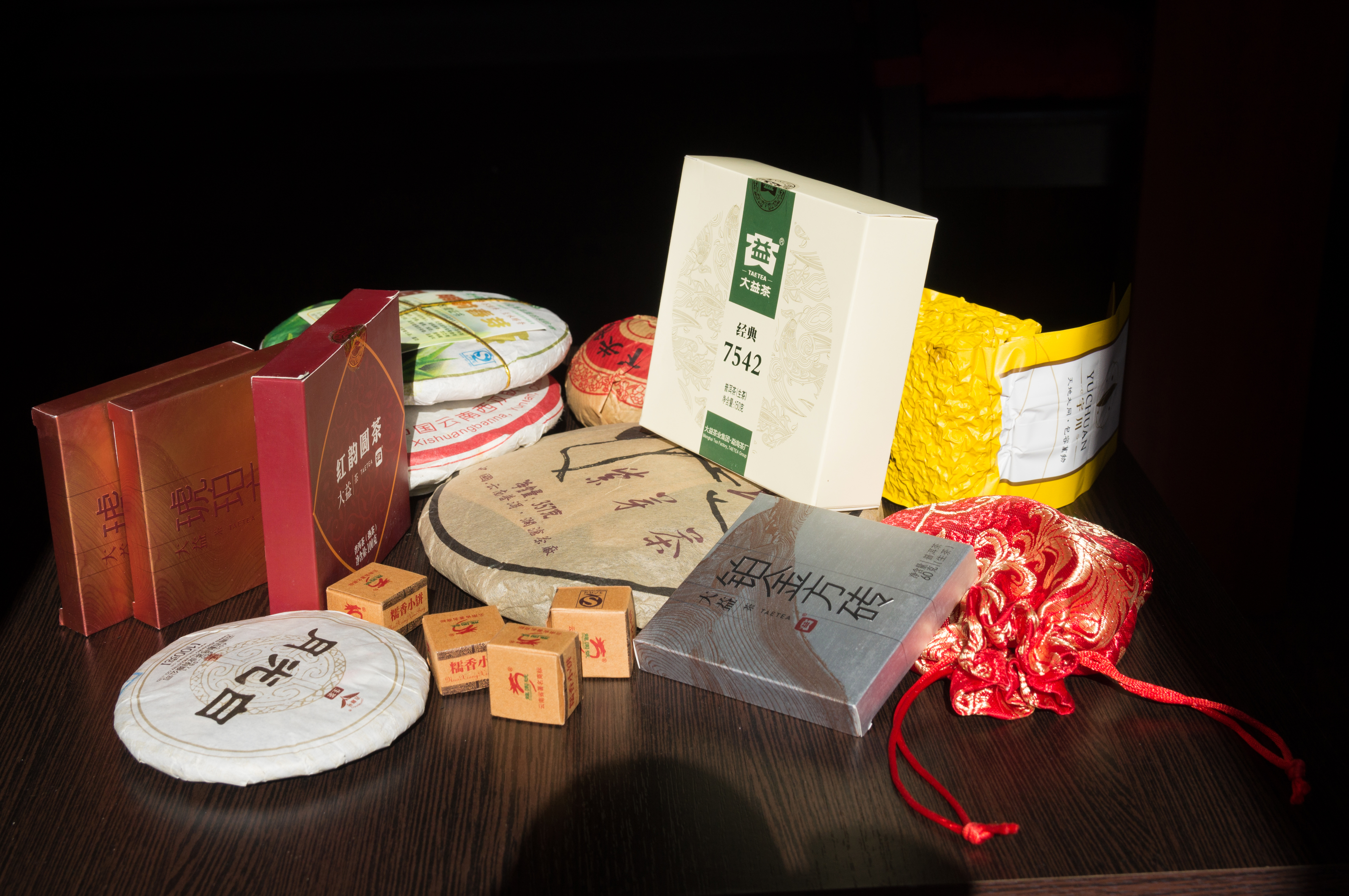
Pu'er tea from Yunnan

Yunnan has several different tea growing regions. One of Yunnan's best known products is Pu-erh tea (or Puer), named after the old tea trading town of Pu-erh (Puer). The province is also known for its Yunnan Gold and other Dianhong teas, developed in the 20th century.

=== Music ===
Several forms of folk music from Yunnan have been identified as elements of national intangible cultural heritage by the Chinese government. They include the multi-ethnic Huadeng opera, and musical traditions from the Zhuang, Yi, and Dai people. Huadeng opera originated in the Ming dynasty or earlier from Shehuo folk celebrations.

=== Chinese medicine ===
Yunnan is host to more than 19,000 species of plants, including 60 percent of the plants used in traditional Chinese medicine.

- Yunnan Baiyao

=== Tourism ===
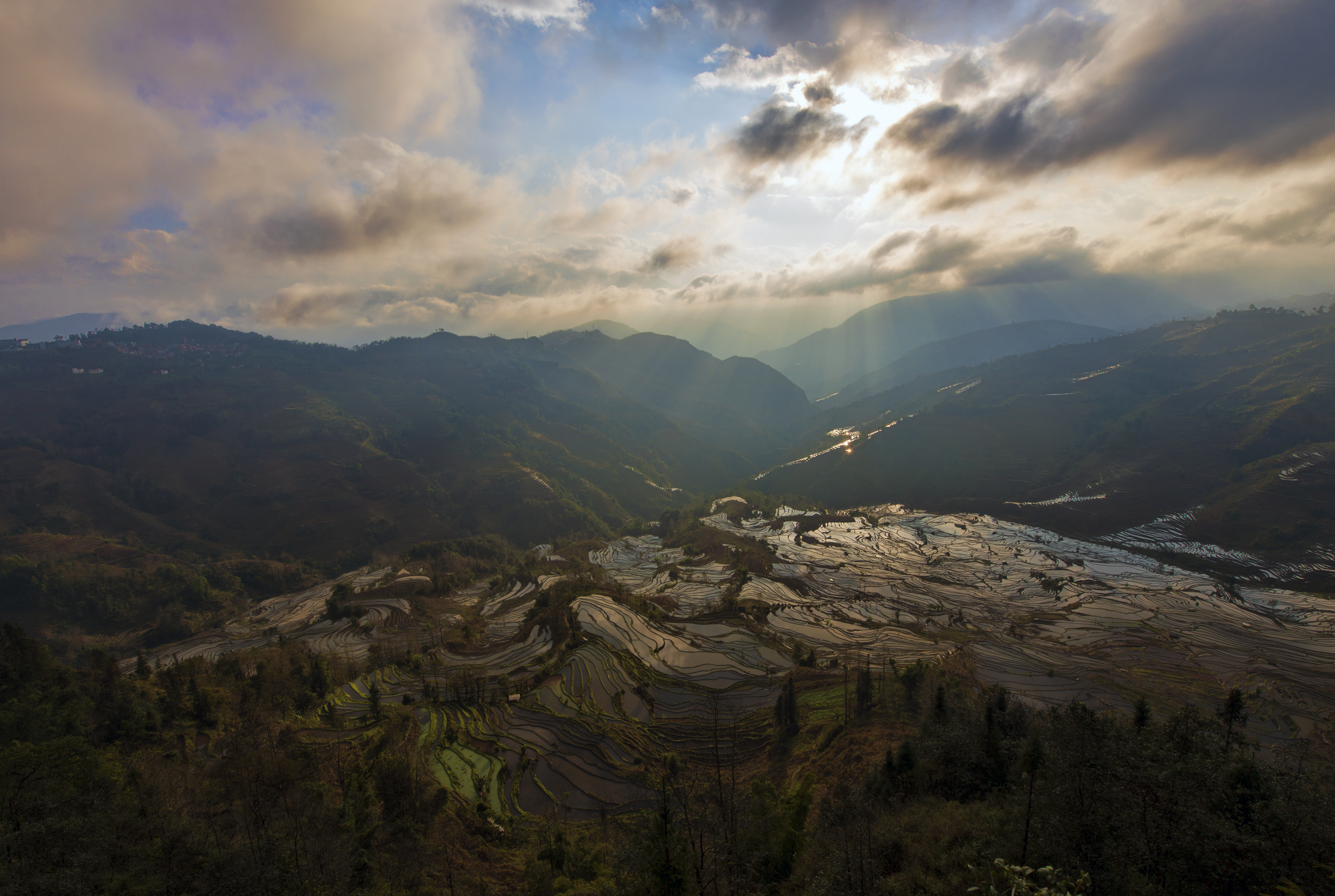
Rice-terraced mountains of Yuanyang county

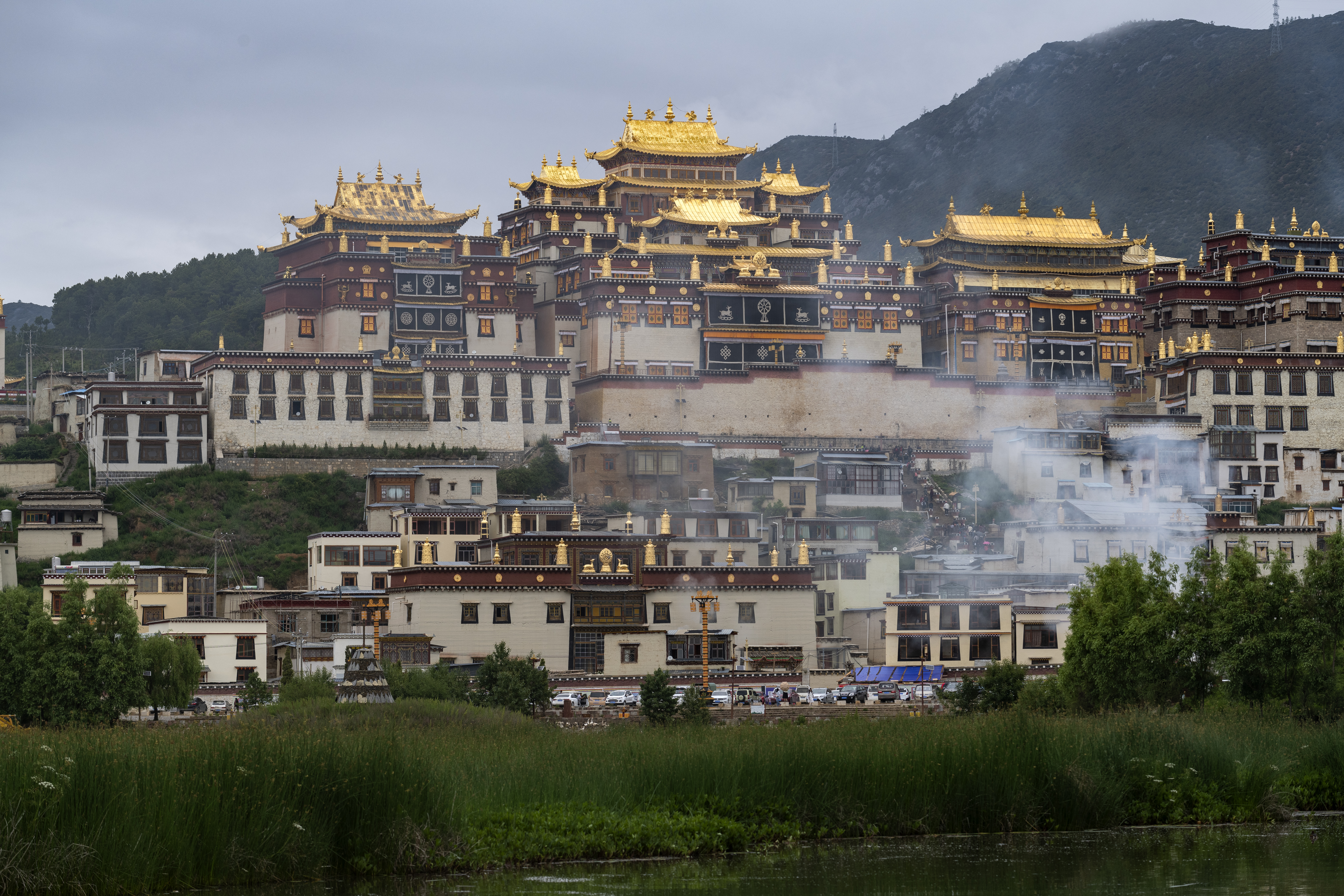
Ganden Sumtseling Monastery in Shangri-La City

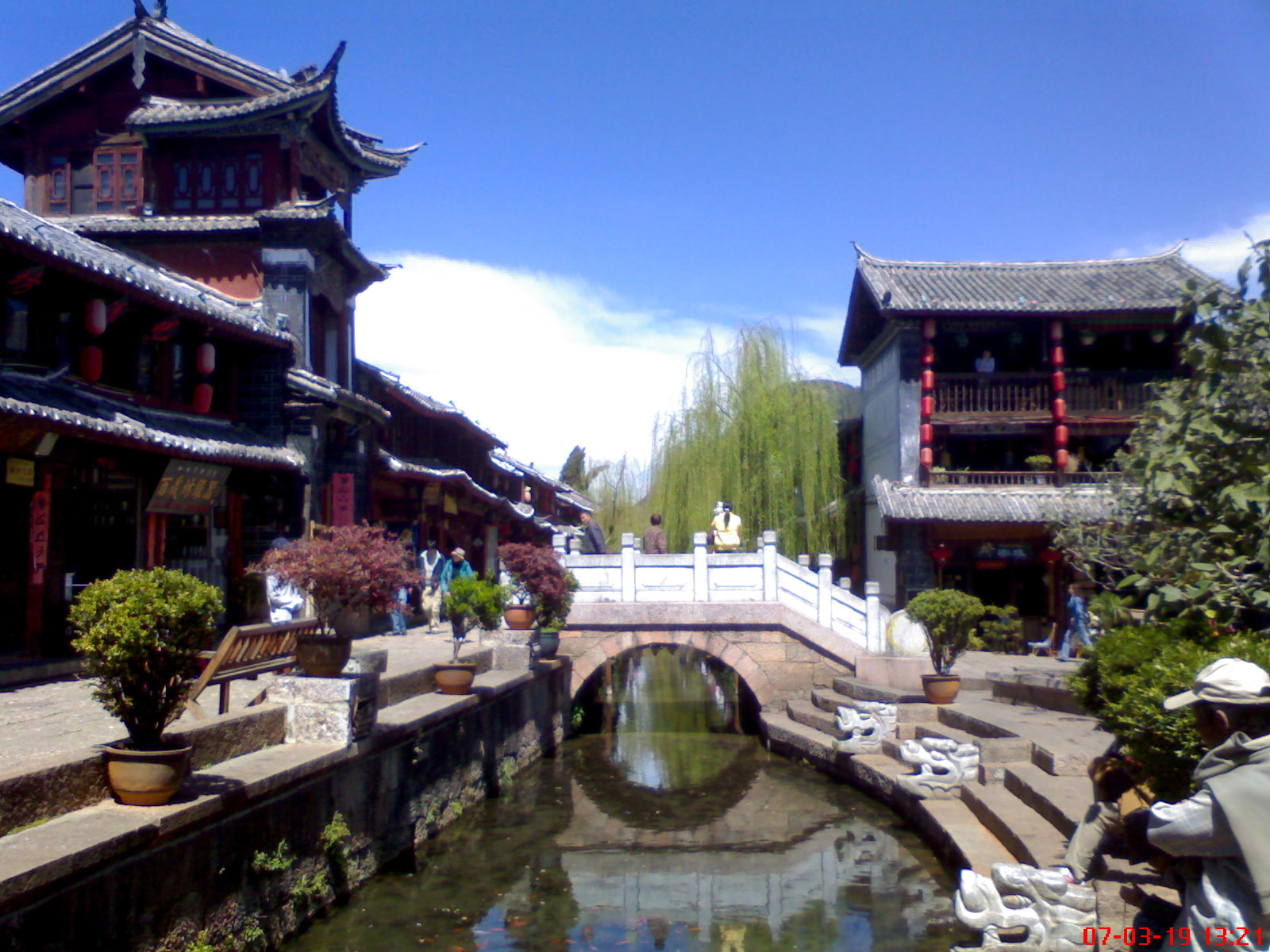
Old Town of Lijiang

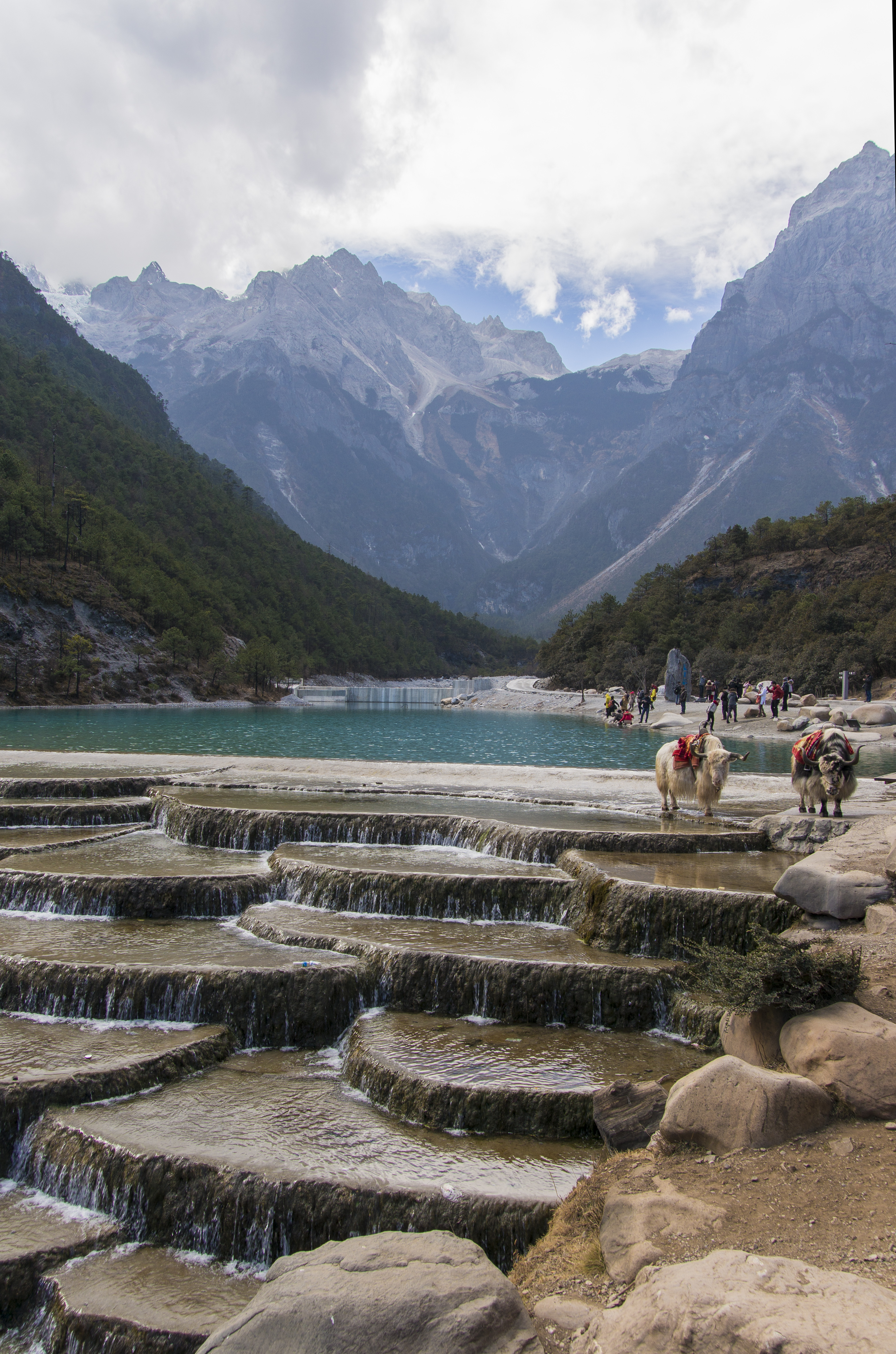
Baishui River with Jade Dragon Snow Mountain in background

Yunnan's landscapes, mild climate, and cultural diversity make it one of China's major tourist destinations. Most visitors are Chinese tourists although trips to Yunnan are organized by an increasing number of foreign travel agencies as well. Mainland tourists travel by the masses, and 2.75 million Chinese visited Yunnan last October during the National Holiday. Also, a different trend is slowly developing: small-scale and environmentally-friendly ecotourism. Projects in the field are now often set up with the help of NGOs.

In 2004, tourism revenues amounted to 37 billion yuan and thus account for 12.6% of the provincial GDP. The capital, Kunming, hosts the China International Travel Mart every two years. The tourism trade fair is the largest of its kind in Asia and serves as an important platform for professionals in the sector. More than 80 countries and regions were present during the 2005 edition.

Tourism is expected to grow further. In 2010, the province welcomed over 2.3 million overseas tourists and the Yunnan Provincial Tourism Bureau aims to draw 4.3 million overseas arrivals under the 12th Five-Year Tourism Development Plan. Kunming city is expected to add 11 new mid- to high-end hotels with an inventory of under 4,000 rooms between 2012 and 2016.

The Nature Conservancy and the Chinese government came together to form a partnership and explore the possibility of bringing adventure tourism onto the rivers of Southwest China. A two-month white-water expedition explored from the Mekong River's Moon Gorge to Yangze River's Great Bend. The expedition provided valuable information to the partnership, encouraging them to take into account the safety, culture, economics, and conservation of the Yunnan. Creating an adventure tourism sector would bring valuable economic resources to the economically struggling population, who once relied on logging as income until it was banned because of deforestation.Yunnan's diverse landscapes and rich cultural heritage have made the province one of China's leading tourist destinations.

Tourist centres in Yunnan include:

- Dali, the historic center of the Nanzhao and Dali kingdoms.
- Chuxiong, the first stop on the way to Dali and Lijiang. Home of the Yi ethnic minority and their respective ancient town.
- Jinghong, the center and prefectural capital of the Xishuangbanna Dai minority autonomous prefecture.
- Lijiang, a Naxi minority city. It has been a UNESCO World Heritage Site since 1997.
- Xamgyi'nyilha County (also known as Shangri-La and formerly Zhongdian), an ethnic Tibetan township and county set high in Yunnan's northwestern mountains.
- Shilin (Stone Forest), a series of karst outcrops east of Kunming.
- Yuanyang, a Hani minority settlement with vast rice-terraced mountains.
- Xishuangbanna, a national scenic resort, noted for its natural and cultural attractions.

=== Places of interest ===
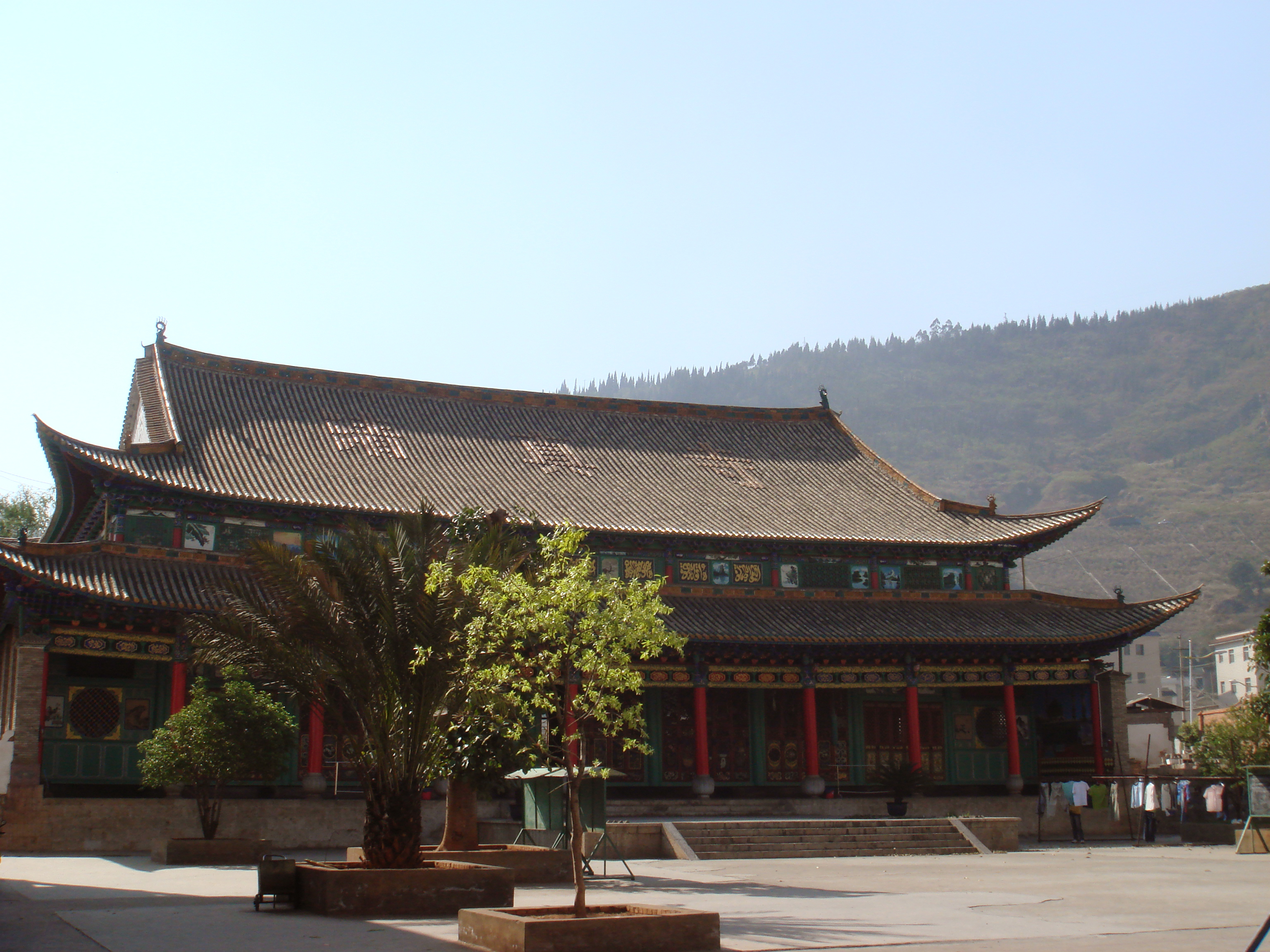
The Gucheng Mosque of Yunnan

- Black Dragon Pool
- Baishuitai
- Cangshan
- Erhai Lake
- Ganlan Basin
- Green Lake Park
- Jade Dragon Snow Mountain
- Lancang River (Mekong River)
- Manting Park (Chunhuan Park) in Jinghong
- Meili Snow Mountain in Deqin
- Pujian Temple
- Sanchahe Nature Reserve in Jinghong
- Shaping Market, Dali
- Shaxi
- Stone Forest
- Three Pagodas
- Tengchong (hot springs)
- Tiger Leaping Gorge
- Visitor Center for Nature and Culture in Northwest Yunnan
- Wase markets, near Dali
- Xishuangbanna Tropical Flower & Plant Garden
- Yuantong Temple
- Yunnan Provincial Museum
- Shaxi Ancient Town, Dali

=== Sport ===
Professional sporting teams in Yunnan have included the now defunct Yunnan Bulls in the Chinese Basketball Association and Yunnan Hongta in the Chinese Jia-A League. The Yunnan Yukun football team currently competes in China League One.
