= G5621 Kunming–Dali Expressway =

Expressway in Yunnan, China

Kunming–Dali Expressway
- 昆明－大理高速公路
- Kunda Expressway 昆大高速公路

Route information
- Auxiliary route of G56
- Length: 307 km (191 mi)

Major junctions
- West end: G56 in Dali City, Dali Bai Autonomous Prefecture, Yunnan
- East end: G5601 in Wuhua District, Kunming, Yunnan

Location
- Country: China

Highway system
- National Trunk Highway System; Primary; Auxiliary; National Highways; Transport in China
← G5618	→ G59

The G5621 Kunming–Dali Expressway (Chinese: 昆明—大理高速公路), commonly referred to as the Kunda Expressway (Chinese: 昆大高速公路), is an expressway in Yunnan, China that connects the cities of Kunming and Dali. The expressway runs parallel to the G56 Hangzhou–Ruili Expressway and it was first opened to traffic on 21 January 2022.
