= G5611 Dali–Lijiang Expressway =

Road in Yunnan, China

Dali–Lijiang Expressway
- 大理－丽江高速公路
- Dali Expressway 大丽高速公路
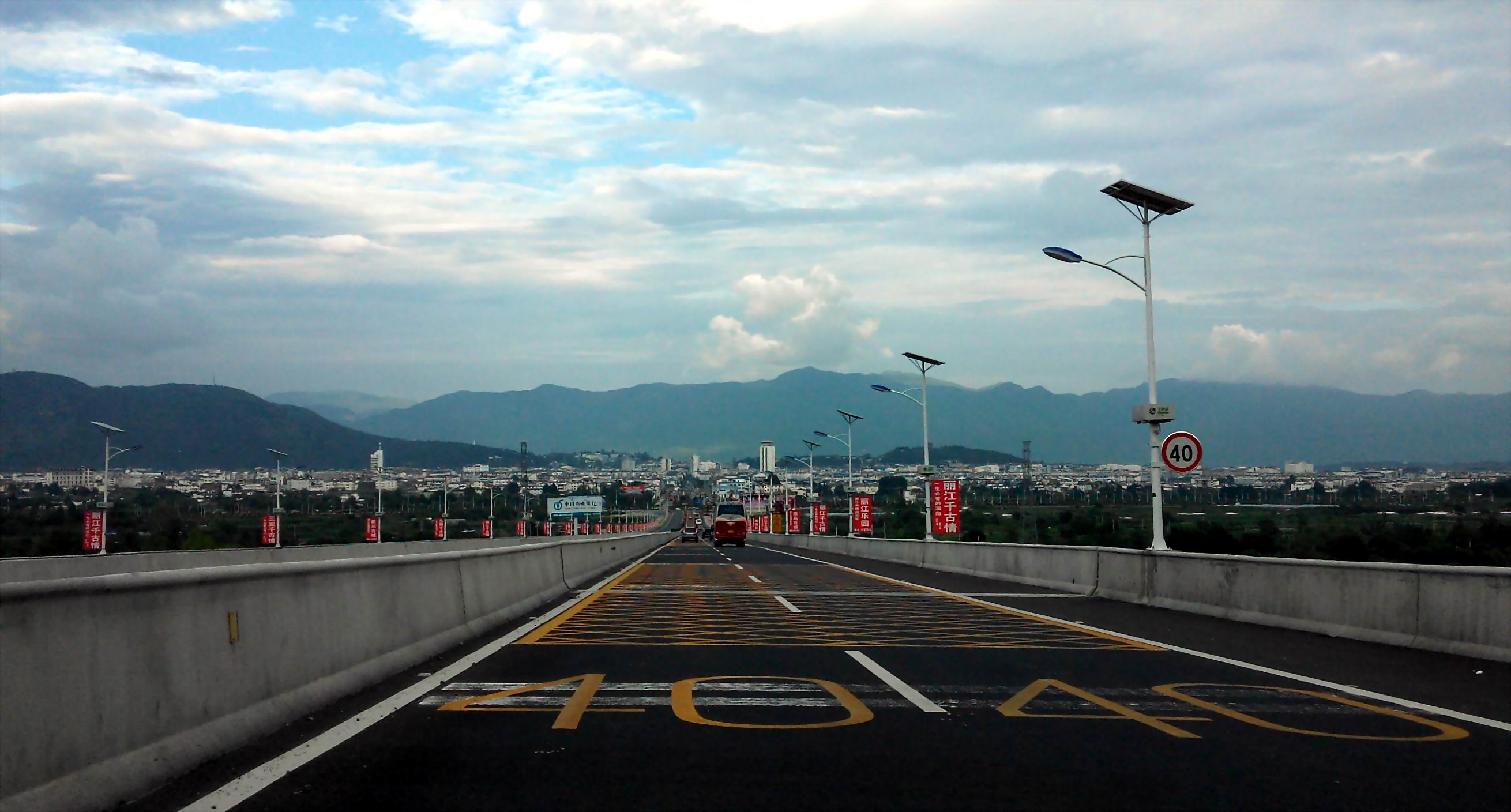
- G5611 Expressway in Lijiang

Route information
- Auxiliary route of G56
- Length: 259 km (161 mi)
- Existed: December 30, 2013–present

Major junctions
- South end: Xiaguan, Yunnan
- North end: Lijiang, Yunnan

Location
- Country: China

Highway system
- National Trunk Highway System; Primary; Auxiliary; National Highways; Transport in China
← G5601	→ G5612

The Dali–Lijiang Expressway (Chinese: 大理—丽江高速公路, p Dàlǐ–Lìjiāng Gāosù Gōnglù), commonly referred to as the Dali Expressway (Chinese: 大丽高速公路, Dàlǐ Gāosù Gōnglù) and designated as the G5611, is a 259-kilometer-long expressway (161 mi) Chinese expressway in that province of Yunnan that connects the tourist city of Lijiang with the Hangrui Expressway (G56) running between Kunming and the Burmese border. It officially opened on 30 December 2013. The expressway features 435 bridges, totalling a length of 98 km (61 mi), and 10 tunnels, totalling a length of 38 km (24 mi), including the 4.398-kilometer-long (2.733 mi) Huajiaoqing Tunnel, the longest tunnel in Yunnan.

The Dali Expressway does not connect to Dali proper but to Xiaguan ("New Dali"), the major industrial city within Dali County. Dali is connected to both ends of the expressway via China National Highway 214.
