= Xiaguan =

Xiaguan may refer to the following locations in China:

- Xiaguan District (下关区), Nanjing
- Xiaguan, Neixiang County (夏馆镇), town in Neixiang County, Henan
- Xiaguan, Dali City (下关镇), town in Yunnan
- Xiaguan, Shangyu (下管镇), town in Shangyu, Zhejiang

== See also ==
- Shimonoseki, Yamaguchi, a city in Japan
