= Chu Zhongzhi =

Chinese politician

- 褚中志

Communist Party Secretary of Dali
- In office August 2013 – January 2015
- Preceded by: Luo Jinzhong
- Succeeded by: Kong Guihua

Personal details
- Born: September 1967 (age 58) Kunming, Yunnan, China
- Party: Chinese Communist Party (1997–2015; expelled)

Chu Zhongzhi (Chinese: 褚中志; pinyin: Chǔ Zhōngzhì; born September 1967) is a Chinese politician from Yunnan province in southwestern China. As of January 2015, he was under investigation by the Communist Party's anti-corruption agency. Previously, he served as the Communist Party Secretary of Dali and a member of the Standing Committee of the CCP Dali Bai Autonomous Prefectural Committee.

== Life and career ==
Chu was born and raised in Kunming, Yunnan.

He began his political career in July 1990, and joined the Chinese Communist Party in March 1997.

Beginning in September 1997, he served in several posts in the Land Resources Department of Kunming, including Deputy Director, Director, and Communist Party Secretary.

In May 2004, he was appointed as an official in the Land Resources Department of Yunnan province and over a period of 15 years worked his way up to the position of Communist Party Secretary of Dali, a tourism destination in Yunnan province.

== Downfall ==
On January 7, 2015, the state media reported that he was being investigated by the Central Commission for Discipline Inspection for "serious violations of laws and regulations". According to the statement, he violated the regulations of honesty and self-discipline, occupied more than the unit group purchase index; violated socialist morality, adulterated with others; took advantage of his position to seek benefits for others, and accepted bribes of more than 3 million yuan, US $10,000 yuan and shares of 550,000 yuan. On April 4, he was detained by the Yunnan Provincial Public Security Department. On September 29, he stood trial at the Intermediate People's Court of Honghe on charges of taking bribes. On October 10, he was expelled from the Chinese Communist Party (CCP) and dismissed from public office. On November 17, he received a sentence of 12 years in prison and fine of 500,000 yuan for corruption.

Party political offices
Preceded by Luo Jinzhong	Communist Party Secretary of Dali; 2013–2015	Succeeded by Kong Guihua
