= Shaping =

Shaping can refer to:

- In baking, shaping refers to the process step directly preceding proofing or final fermentation.
- In electricity generation, maintaining reliable delivery, for example by use of pumped storage hydroelectricity.
- In archeology, the shaping (archeology) is the process of giving a stone a desired shape.
- In psychology, shaping (psychology), is the reinforcement of successive approximations to train a type of behavior.
- In communications, Traffic shaping, is the internet traffic management.
- In underwear, a shaping product is an undergarment designed to impermanently alter the wearer's body shape.
- In mechanics, shaping is a material removal process in which a cutting tool takes mass and shapes a stationary object to produce a sculpted or plane surface.
  - Gear shaper, the shaping process used specifically for gear manufacturing.
- Shaping (audio), modifications both additive and subtractive that alter the final timbre of the initial audio wave whether this is produced as an acoustic sound wave or an electric signal.

== Chinese places ==
=== Towns ===
- Shaping, Dianjiang County (沙坪镇), town in Dianjiang County, Chongqing
- Shaping, Lechang (沙坪镇), town in Guangdong
- Shaping, Lingshan County (沙坪镇), town in Lingshan County, Guangxi
- Shaping, Taoyuan (沙坪镇), town in Taoyuan County, Hunan.

subdistrict

- Shaping, Changsha (沙坪街道), a subdistrict of Kaifu District, Changsha.

=== Villages ===
- Shaping Village, Dali (沙坪村), a village of Shangguan, Dali, Yunnan.
- Shaping Village, Daguan (沙坪村), a village of Ruile town (悦乐镇) in Daguan County, Yunnan.
