= Streptomyces daliensis =

Scientific classification
- Domain: Bacteria
- Kingdom: Bacillati
- Phylum: Actinomycetota
- Class: Actinomycetia
- Order: Streptomycetales
- Family: Streptomycetaceae
- Genus: Streptomyces
- Species: S. daliensis

Binomial name
- Streptomyces daliensis Xu et al. 2012

Type strain
- CCTCC AA 204020, KCTC 19076, YIM 31724

Species of bacterium

Streptomyces daliensis is a bacterium species from the genus of Streptomyces which has been isolated from soil in Dali in the Yunnan Province in China.

== See also ==
- List of Streptomyces species
