= G5618 Lincang–Qingshuihe Expressway =

Road in China

Lincang–Qingshuihe Expressway
- 临沧－清水河高速公路
- Linqing Expressway 臨清高速公路
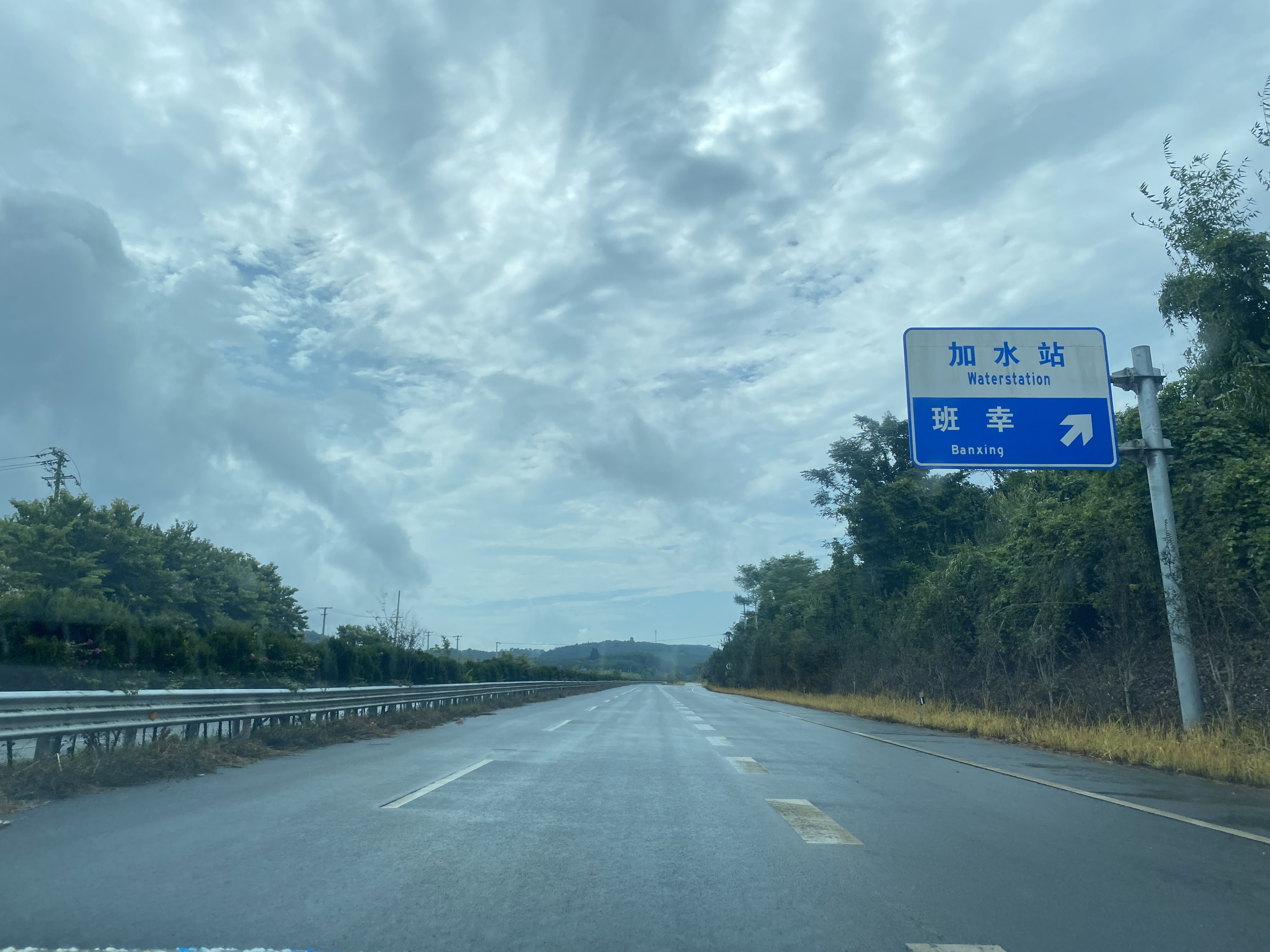

Route information
- Auxiliary route of G56
- Length: 156.48 km (97.23 mi)

Major junctions
- West end: G233 in Gengma Dai and Va Autonomous County, Lincang, Yunnan
- East end: G5615 in Linxiang District, Lincang, Yunnan

Location
- Country: China

Highway system
- National Trunk Highway System; Primary; Auxiliary; National Highways; Transport in China
← G5617	→ G5621

The G5618 Lincang–Qingshuihe Expressway (Chinese: 臨滄—清水河高速公路), also referred to as the Linqing Expressway (Chinese: 臨清高速公路), is an expressway in Lincang, Yunnan, China that connects Linxiang District to Qingshuihe Port on the China–Myanmar border in Gengma Dai and Va Autonomous County. The expressway has a total length of 156.482 km (97.233 mi) and was opened to traffic on April 28, 2025.
