= Zhusheng Temple =

Zhusheng Temple (simplified Chinese: 祝圣寺; traditional Chinese: 祝聖寺; pinyin: Zhùshèng Sì)

- Zhusheng Temple (Hunan), in Hengshan, Hunan, China
- Zhusheng Temple (Yunnan), Binchuan County, Yunnan, China
