= Mount Jizu =

Mountain in China

Jizu Shan
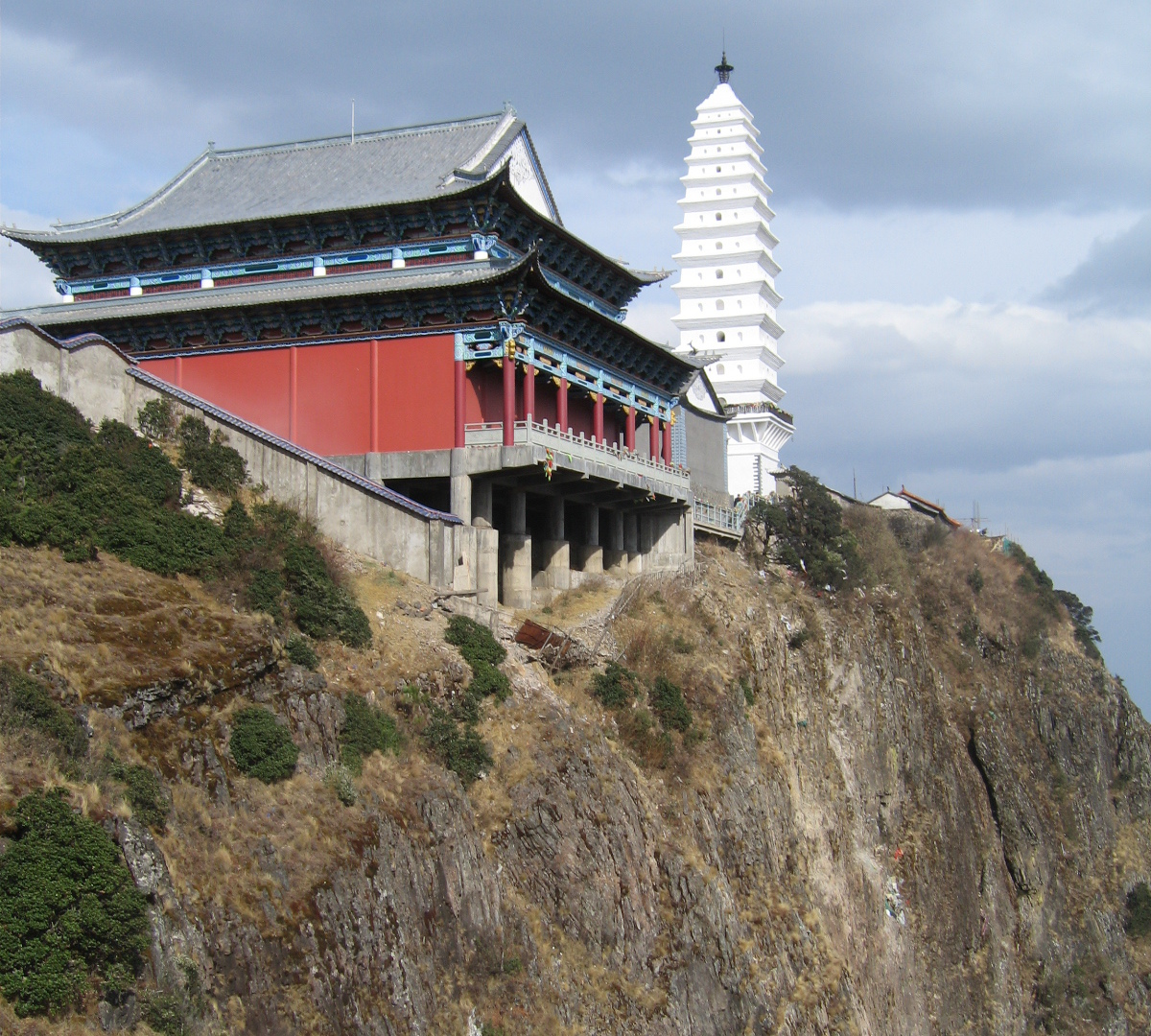
- The summit of Mount Jizu

Highest point
- Elevation: 3,240 m (10,630 ft)
- Coordinates: 25°56′33″N 100°23′51″E

Geography
- Location within Yunnan
- Location: Dali Prefecture, Yunnan, China

Mount Jizu (simplified Chinese: 鸡足山; traditional Chinese: 雞足山; pinyin: Jīzú Shān; lit. 'Chicken-foot Mountain') is situated in Dali Prefecture, Yunnan Province, China. The mountain is located to the northeast of Erhai and forms the tripoint of three counties: Heqing, Binchuan, and Dali City. Mount Jizu is a famed holy mountain in Buddhism. Its main peak, Tianzhu Peak, rises some 3,240 metres above sea level. The mountain is vegetated with dense forests and bamboo groves. With three mountain ranges to the front and one range to the rear, it appears like a cock's foot, hence its common name Mount Cock's Foot or Mt. Cock's Claw. Yet another name for this mountain is Nine Strata Cliffs.

Haicheng Ling et al. (2005: p. 40) relate the experience of Xu Xiake (1586-1641):

"On the top of Tianzhu Peak, people can admire sun-rise in the east, sea of auspicious clouds in the south, the Cangshan Mountain and the Erhai Lake in the west, and the Yulong Snow Mountain in the north. Xu Xiake (1586-1641), a famous traveller and writer of the Ming Dynasty (1368-1644), marvelled that on the top of a single peak, people could see the "Four Scenes" - sun, lake, cloud and snow. "

The mountain is now not only a center of Zen, Pureland, and Tibetan Buddhism, but also a popular weekend getaway for Chinese tourists. A cablecar whisking visitors to the summit was installed above Tangyuan Street (汤圆街) in 2011.

== Nomenclature, orthography and etymology ==
'Mount Jakang Chen' (Tibetan: རི་བྱ་རྐང་ཅན, Wylie: ri bya rkang can) (alternate names: Riwo Jakang, Mount Jizu, Jizu Shan, Jizushan Mountain)

Tan Chung (1998: p. 136) states that:

"Among the legends of Yunnan, there is one recorded in the Gazetteer of Yunnan Province compiled during the Ming Dynasty (1368-1644). A "Cock's Foot Hill" (Jizushan) at Binchuan County in the province was obviously christened after the Sanskrit Kukkatapadagiri - the name of the hill only 50 kilometres away from the bodhi tree under which Gautama Buddha attained enlightenment."

== Temples ==
During the Three Kingdoms period, small nunneries were built, to be later expanded in the Tang dynasty. Most of the temple construction was during the Ming dynasty and Qing dynasty. Temples of note are the: Xitang Temple, Shizhong Temple, Huayan Temple and Jinding Temple (Golden Top) which had been relocated from Kunming. Later, many temples fell into ruins, and now, only Zhushengsi Temple, the gate tower of Jinding Temple and Lengyan Pagoda are maintained.

As Haicheng Ling et al. (2005: p. 40) hold:

"The first temple on Mount Jizu was built during the Tang dynasty (AD 618-907). Later, more temples were added in the Song, Yuan, Ming and Qing dynasties, covering a long period from 960 to 1911. In the reign of the Kangxi Emperor (1662-1722) of the Qing dynasty (1644-1911), there were 42 big or small temples, 65 nunneries and more than 170 abodes for peace, with more than 5,000 monks and nuns. Existing temples on Mount Jizu are the Zunsheng Tower Temple, the Xitan Temple, the Zhusheng Temple, the Jiguang Temple, the Shizhong Temple and the Dajue Temple."

Zunsheng Tower Temple, Xitan Temple, the Zhusheng Temple, the Jiguang Temple, the Shizhong Temple and the Dajue Temple.

== Buddhism ==
Legend and folklore holds it that Mount Jizu was a bodhimandala of Mahakasyapa, one of the foremost disciples of Shakyamuni.

=== Tantric Buddhism ===
Monica Esposito (1993: vol2., p. 389-440; 1997: p. 67-123) mentions the 'Longmen' (lóngmén) Tantric branch of Mount Jizu a regional example of the tradition that yielded the Longmen Grottoes.

The Upa-yoga tantra scriptures first appeared in 'Mount Jakang Chen' (Tibetan: རི་བྱ་རྐང་ཅན, Wylie: ri bya rkang can; alternate names: Riwo Jakang, Mount Jizu) and the charnel ground of 'Cool Grove' (Tibetan: བསིལ་བའི་ཚལ, Wylie: bsil ba'i tshal). Cool Grove is also known as 'Śītavana' (Sanskrit).

Yinxiang Temple 迎祥寺 (present day Zhusheng Temple zh:祝圣寺) on Jizu mountains became the field of activity of the famous monk Xu Yun (1840 - 1959). The story was recently popularized in the TV-series 百年虚云 (PRC, 2009, cf. zh:中国大陆电视剧列表 (2009年)).

== See also ==
- Dacheng teaching of Mount Jizu
