= Dali University =

University in Dali City, Yunnan, China

Coordinates: 25.6742°N 100.1533°E

- 大理大学
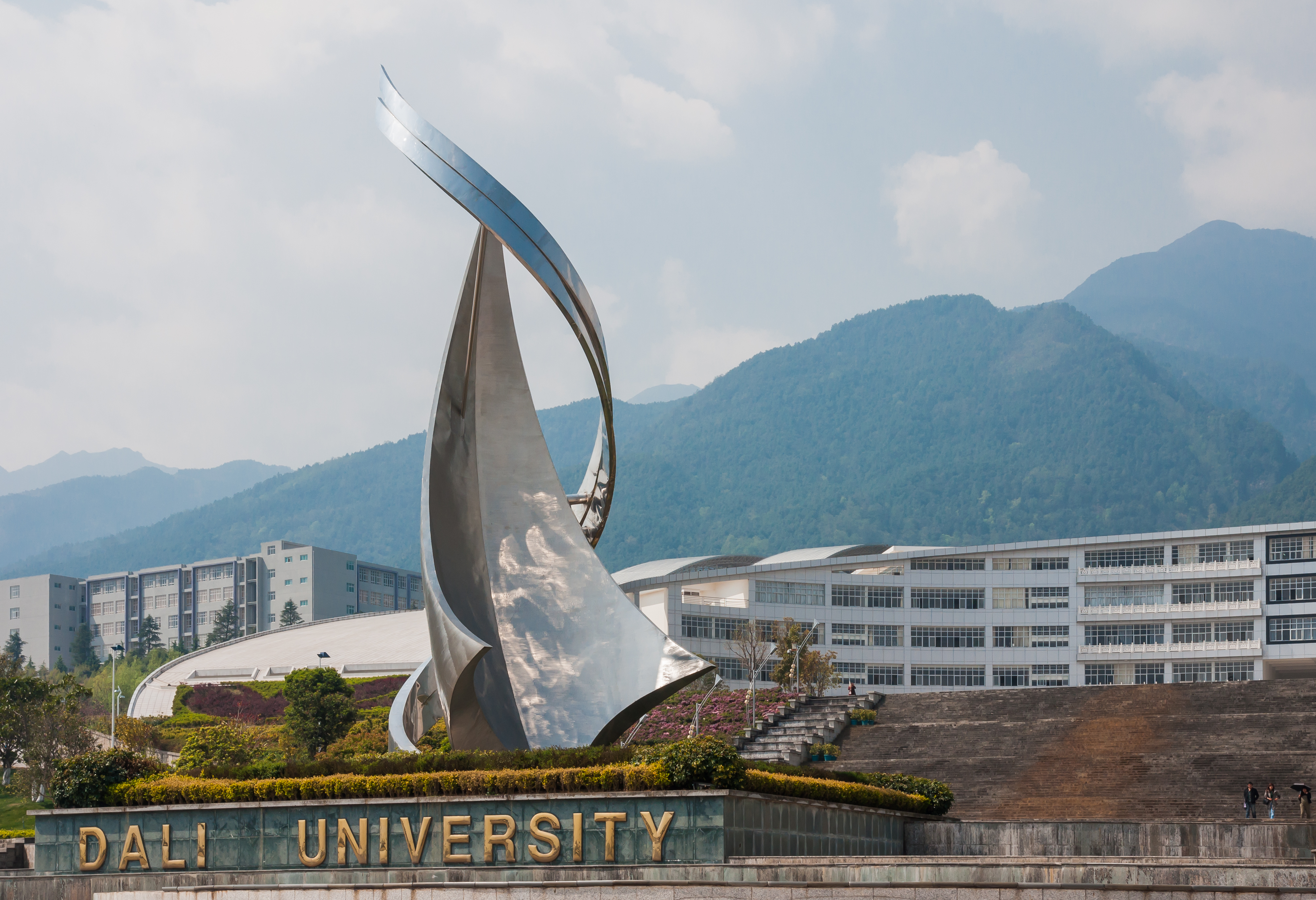
- Front facade of city campus
- Motto: 博学达真 大德至理
- Motto in English: Dade Dudgeon learned to reason
- Type: Provincial Public
- Established: 1978; 48 years ago (Dali Medical College & Dali Teachers College); 2001; 25 years ago (Dali University)
- President: Zhang Qiaogui
- Administrative staff: 1,200
- Students: 17,900
- Location: Dali, Yunnan, China
- Campus: Urban, 410 acres
- Colours
- Website: www.dali.edu.cn

Dali University is a provincial public university in Dali, Yunnan China. The university is affiliated with the Yunnan Provincial People's Government.

== History ==
Dali University can be traced back to its predecessors, Dali Medical College and Dali Teachers College, which were established in 1978. In 2001, the two schools merged to form Dali College.

== Academic exchanges ==
- The academic symposium between the Association of Southeast Asian Nations’universities and Chinese universities March 2013
- Teaching master's degree courses with Deakin University (Australia) December 2012
- The academic symposium of China's geophysical and applied mathematics September 2012
- Sign a cooperation agreement with Sunraysia Institute of TAFE (Australia) September 2011

== Rankings and reputation ==
Dali University is an international university that enjoys a high reputation in Southeast Asia and throughout South Asia. As of 2013, there were more than 5000 international students graduated from Dali University. They were from 42 countries and regions, including Thailand, Laos, Cambodia, Nepal, India, Pakistan, Bangladesh, USA and South Korea.

As of 2022, the Best Chinese Universities Ranking ranked Dali University 5th in Yunnan Province after (Yunnan University, Kunming University of Science and Technology, Yunnan Normal University, and Yunnan Agricultural University) and 308th in China. Dali is the only university in Dali City to rank among the top 5 universities in Yunnan province, apart from major universities, located in the provincial capital city of Kunming.

Dili University was ranked 2082th worldwide and 361th in China by the University Rankings by Academic Performance 2023/24.

As of 2024, Dali University was ranked # 2138 globally, # 932 in Asia and # 358 in China in the 2024-2025 Best Global Universities by the U.S. News & World Report Best Global University Ranking.
