= Shangguan, Dali =

Shangguan Town 上关镇
- Town
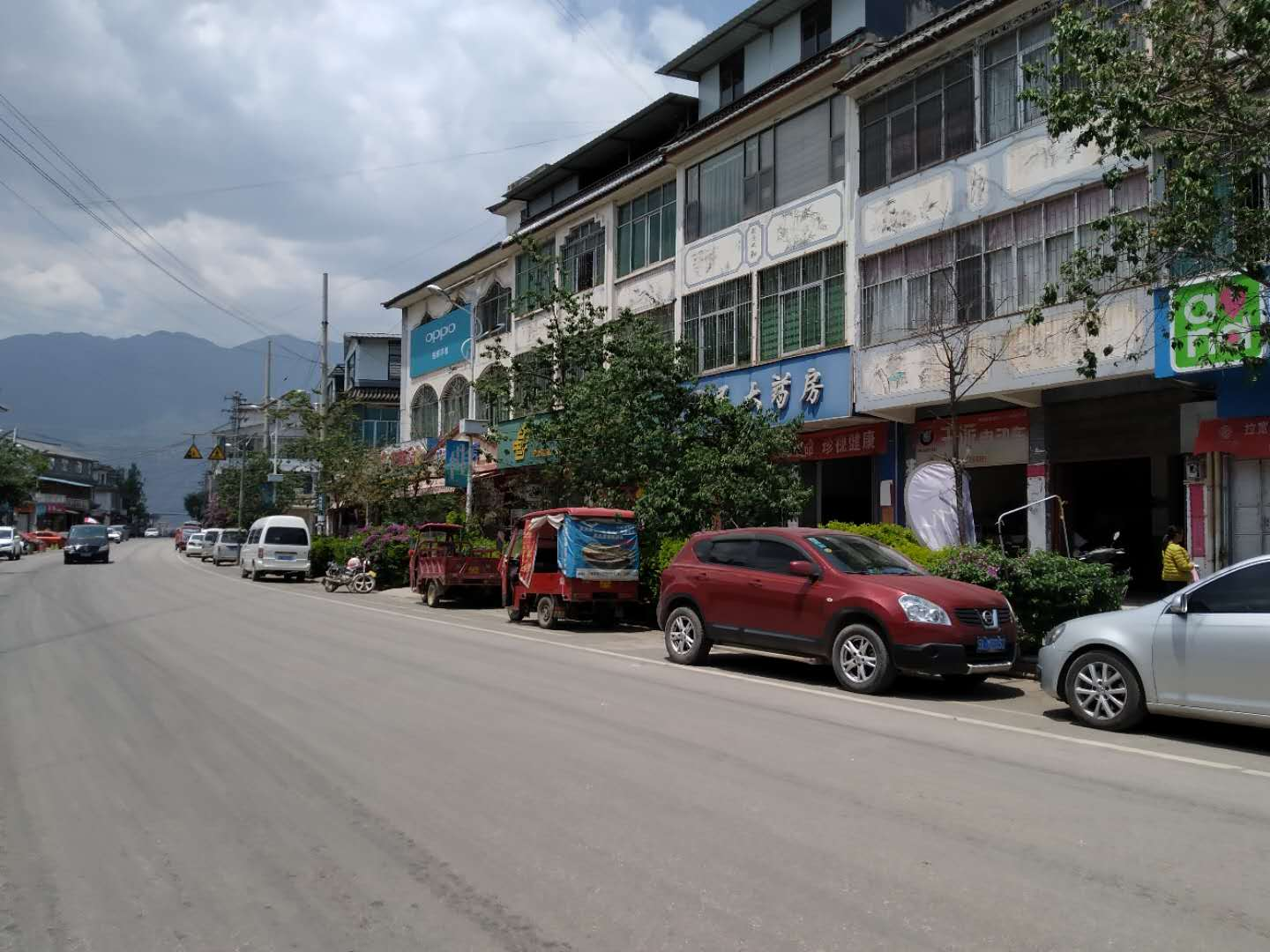

- Location of Shangguan Town in Dali City
- Country: China
- Province: Yunnan
- Autonomous prefecture: Dali
- County-level city: Dali
- Seat: 1 Jiangwei New District (江尾新区1号)

Government
  - Mayor: Yin Zhixiong (尹志雄)
  - Party Committee Secretary: Ma Xiaolei (马晓磊)

Area
  - Total: 115.59 km^{2} (44.63 sq mi)

Population (2020)
  - Total: 36,565

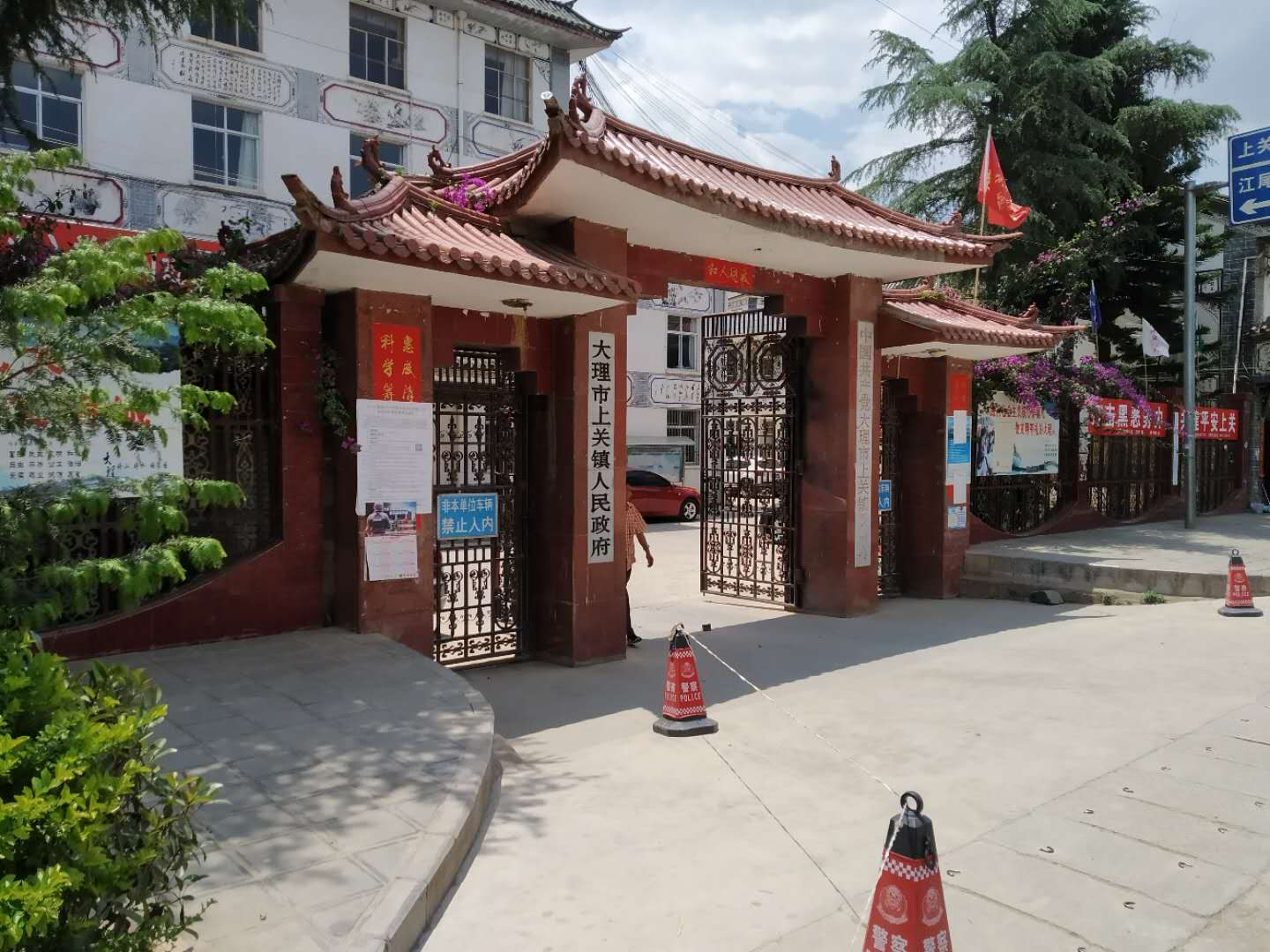
Shangguan town government

Shangguan Town (simplified Chinese: 上关镇; traditional Chinese: 上關鎮; pinyin: Shàngguān Zhèn; Bai: Doux guerf) is a town under the administration of Dali City, Dali Bai Autonomous Prefecture, Yunnan, China.

== Administrative divisions ==
Shangguan administers the following administrative divisions:

Jiangwei Village (江尾村), Qingsuo Village (青索村), Dabaguan Village (大把关村), Zhaoyi Village (兆邑村), Louyi Village (漏邑村), Shaping Village (沙坪村), East Shaping or Dongshaping Village (东沙坪村), Dapai Village (大排村), Hewei Village (河尾村), Daying Village (大营村), Majiayi Village (马甲邑村), Machang Village (马厂村), and Haichaohe Village (海潮河村).
