= Dali Town, Yunnan =

Town in Yunnan, China

Dali 大理镇 Tali
- Town
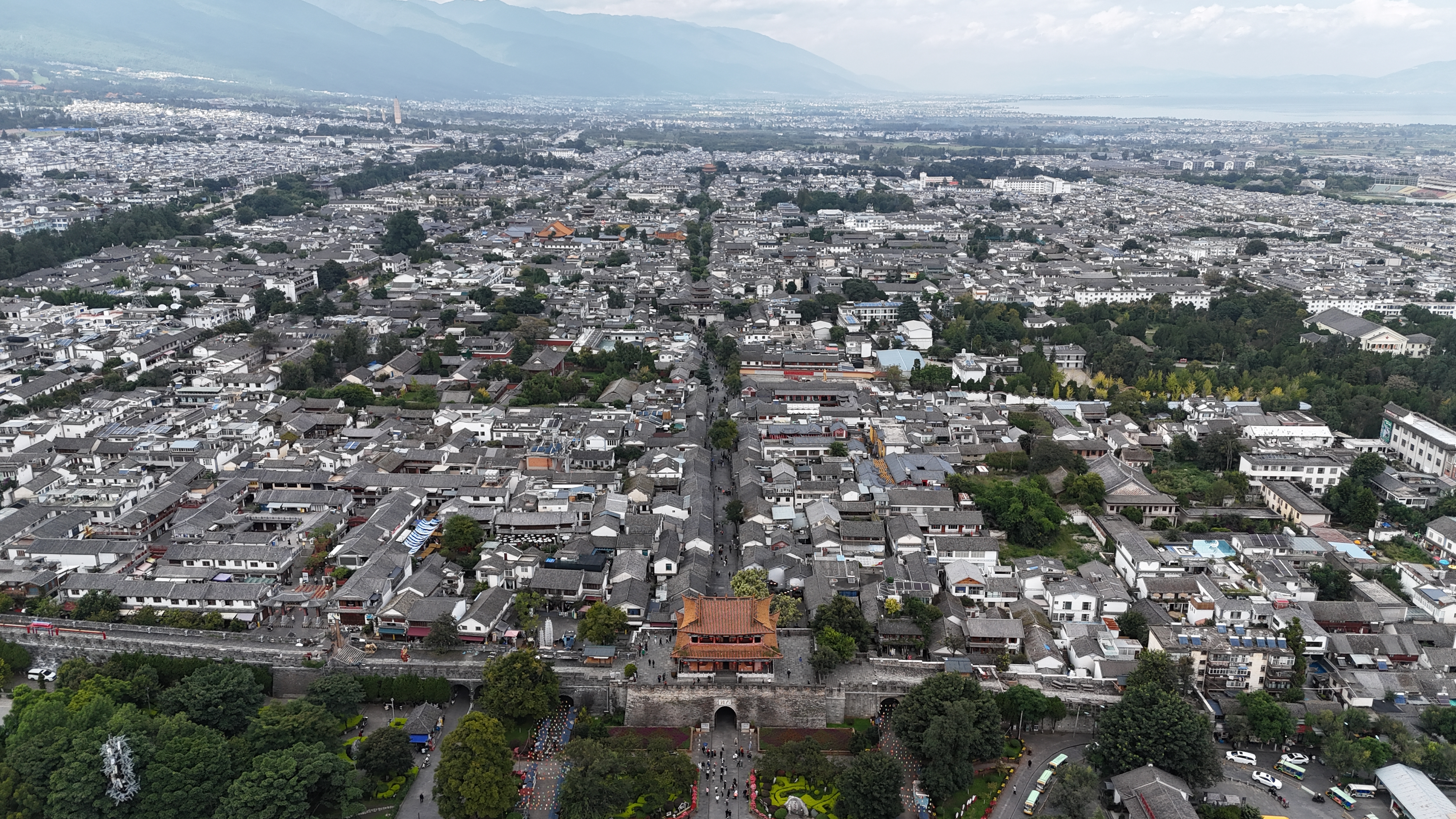
- Dali Old Town

- Location in Yunnan
- Coordinates: 25°42′09″N 100°09′19″E
- Country: People's Republic of China
- Province: Yunnan
- Autonomous prefecture: Dali
- County-level city: Dali City
- Elevation: 2,007 m (6,585 ft)

Population (2010)
  - Total: 82,556
- Time zone: UTC+8 (China Standard)

Dali Old Town Dali

Chinese name
- Chinese: 大理古城
- Postal: Tali
Transcriptions
Standard Mandarin
- Hanyu Pinyin: Dàlǐ Gǔchéng
- Wade–Giles: Ta⁴-li³

Bai name
- Bai: Darl·lit

Hani name
- Hani: Dafli

Dali Town (Chinese: 大理镇; pinyin: Dàlǐ Zhèn) is a township-level division in Dali City, in the northwest of Yunnan province, China. The town contains the historic centre of the county-level city of Dali and is also commonly known as Dali Old Town (Chinese: 大理古城; pinyin: Dàlǐ Gǔchéng). The modern centre of Dali City, however, is 10 km south of the old town at Xiaguan. Being the county seat of Dali City, Xiaguan is often labelled as Dali on maps and is sometimes referred to as Dali New Town (大理新镇) to distinguish it from Dali Town. The old town has become well known as a tourist site in part thanks to its picturesque location and historic Bai architecture.

== History ==
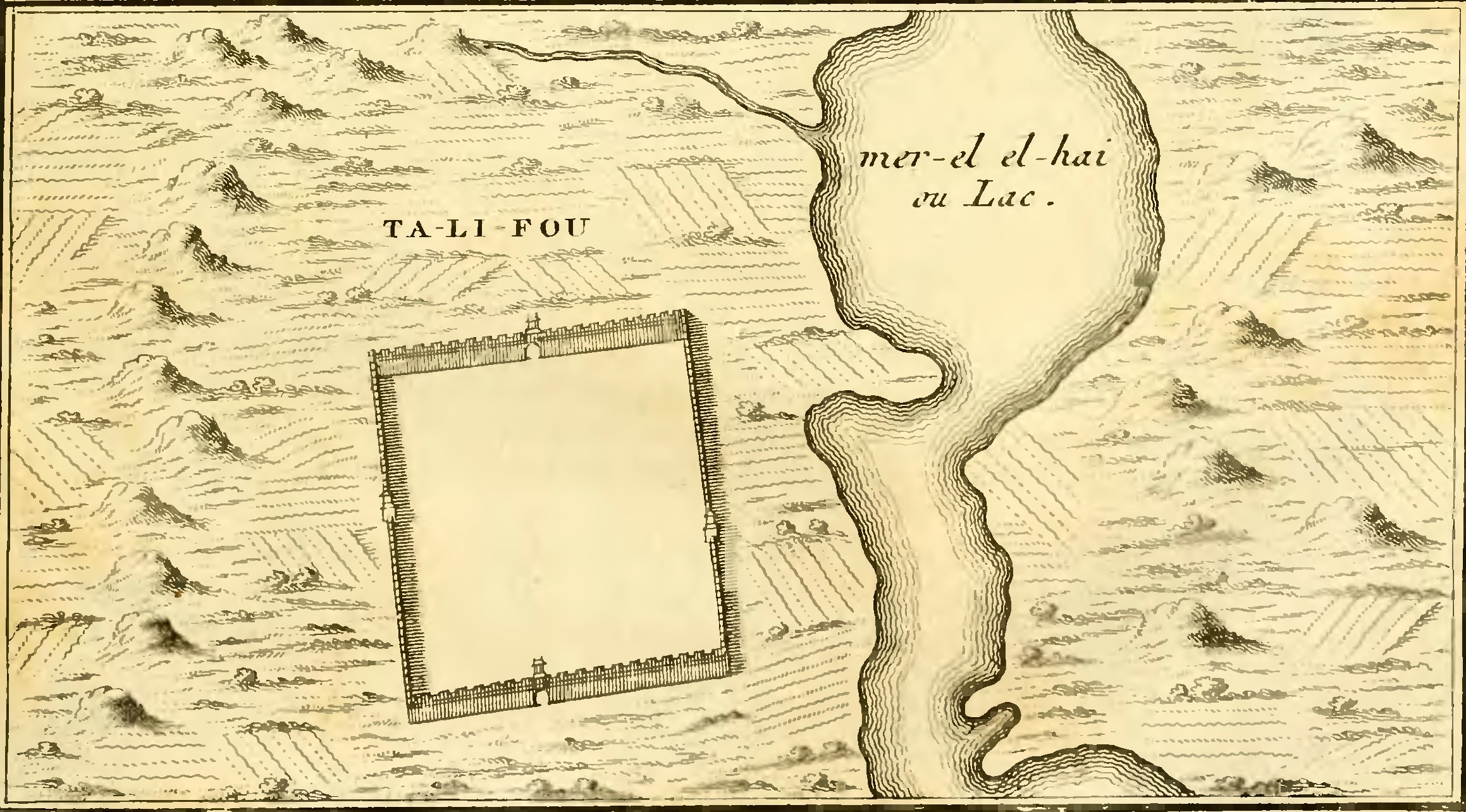
An inset of "Ta-Li-Fou" and "El-hai" from Du Halde's 1736 Description of China.

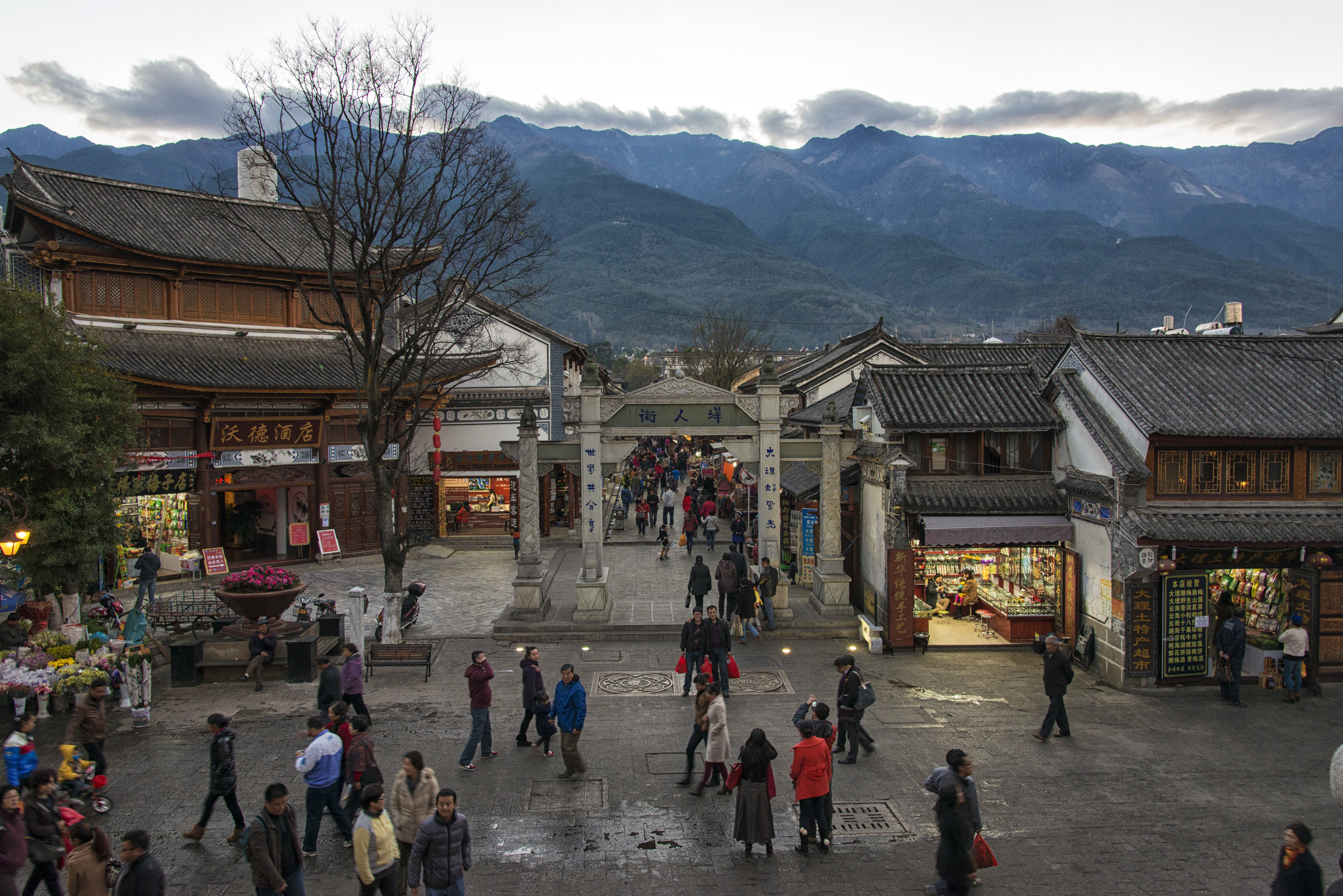
Night view of the area

Dali has long been a regional centre of commerce, being located at a crossroads of trade routes between Tibet, China, Burma, and Southeast Asia. The Bai people first settled the region 3000 years ago. Dali first emerged as the capital of the Nanzhao Kingdom in the 8th century. Later, the town served as the capital of the Kingdom of Dali until its conquest by the Yuan.

The old town of Dali has been preserved in a 1.5 by 1.5 km wide townsite surrounded by its ancient walls. Due to its relatively well-preserved architecture, the town has developed as a major tourist attraction in recent decades. Major sites of interest include the Three Pagodas, Dali Museum, the ancient city gates, an artificial town built as the set for Demi-Gods and Semi-Devils, and the Cang Mountain Range to the west.

== Geography ==
Dali Town is located in a depression at the southern end of the Yun Mountains, part of the greater Hengduan Mountains at the southeast edge of the Tibetan Plateau. This depression, an extension of the Red River Fault, is filled by Erhai, a lake that is part of the Mekong River basin. The old town of Dali is located on a plain between Erhai on the east and the Cang Mountains to the west.

== Transportation ==
Dali is served by local public transit buses in Dali City connecting with Xiaguan. The town also has some long-distance bus services that run to Kunming and Lijiang. Highway 214 runs through the town, eventually connecting with Tibet Autonomous Region in the north and Xishuangbanna in the south. The nearest train station and airport are both in Xiaguan.

== Tourism ==
Dali has been dramatically changed by tourism since the mid-2000s, when a number of bed-and-breakfast began to open to cater to domestic and foreign tourists. Subsequent to the discovery of pollution in Erhai lake and a visit from Chinese President and General Secretary of the Communist Party Xi Jinping, inns within twenty meters of the lakeside were closed and in some cases demolished, in order to prevent sewage from leaking into the lake.
