= G5601 Kunming Ring Expressway =

Road in China

Kunming Ring Expressway
- 昆明绕城高速公路
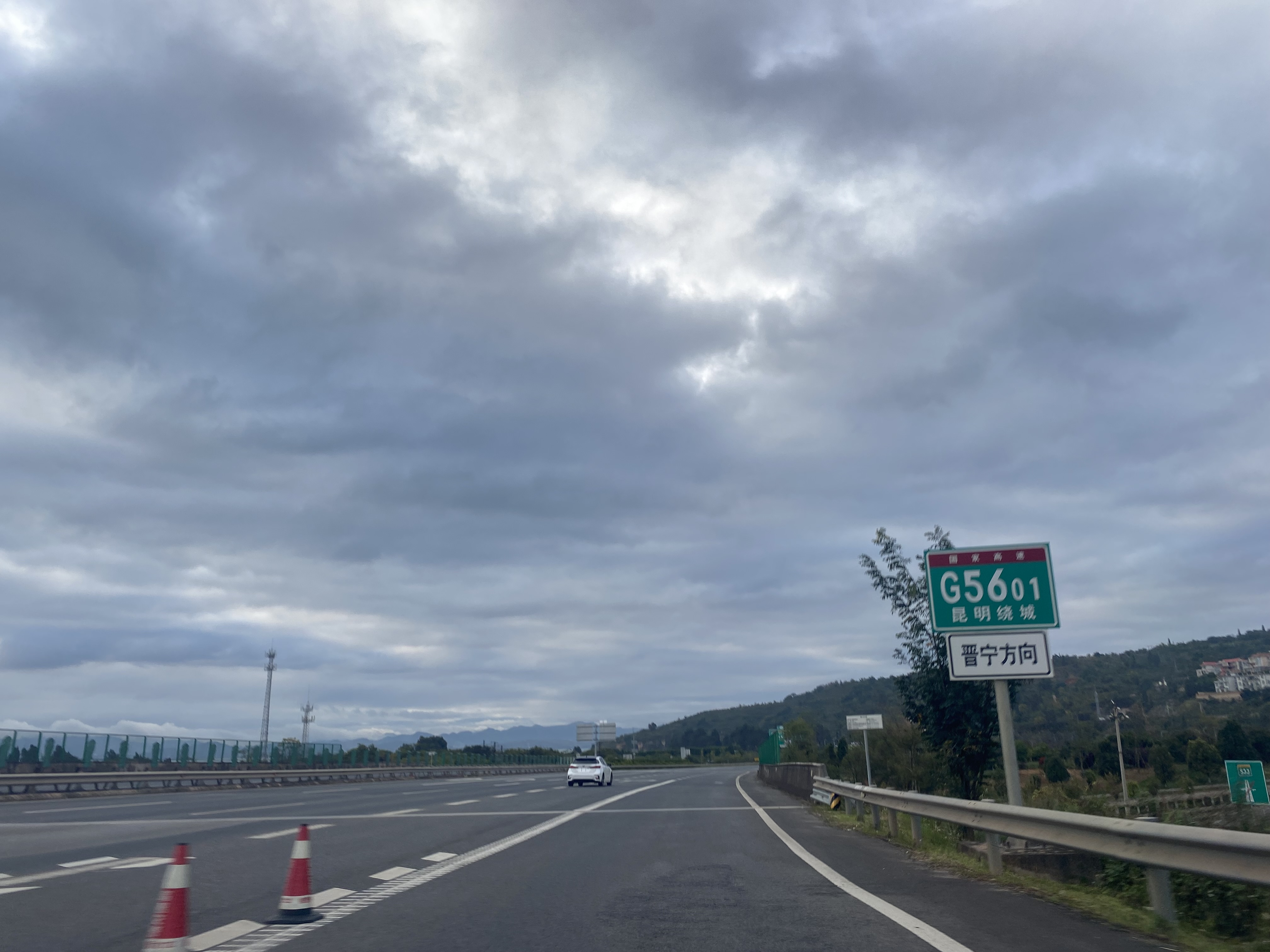

Route information
- Length: 113 km (70 mi)

Location
- Country: China

Highway system
- National Trunk Highway System; Primary; Auxiliary; National Highways; Transport in China
| ← G56 | → G5611 |

The Kunming Ring Expressway (Chinese: 昆明绕城高速公路), designated as G5601, is an 113-kilometre-long (70 mi) expressway in Kunming, Yunnan, China.
