= Zhusheng Temple (Yunnan) =

Buddhist temple in Yunnan, China

- 祝圣寺
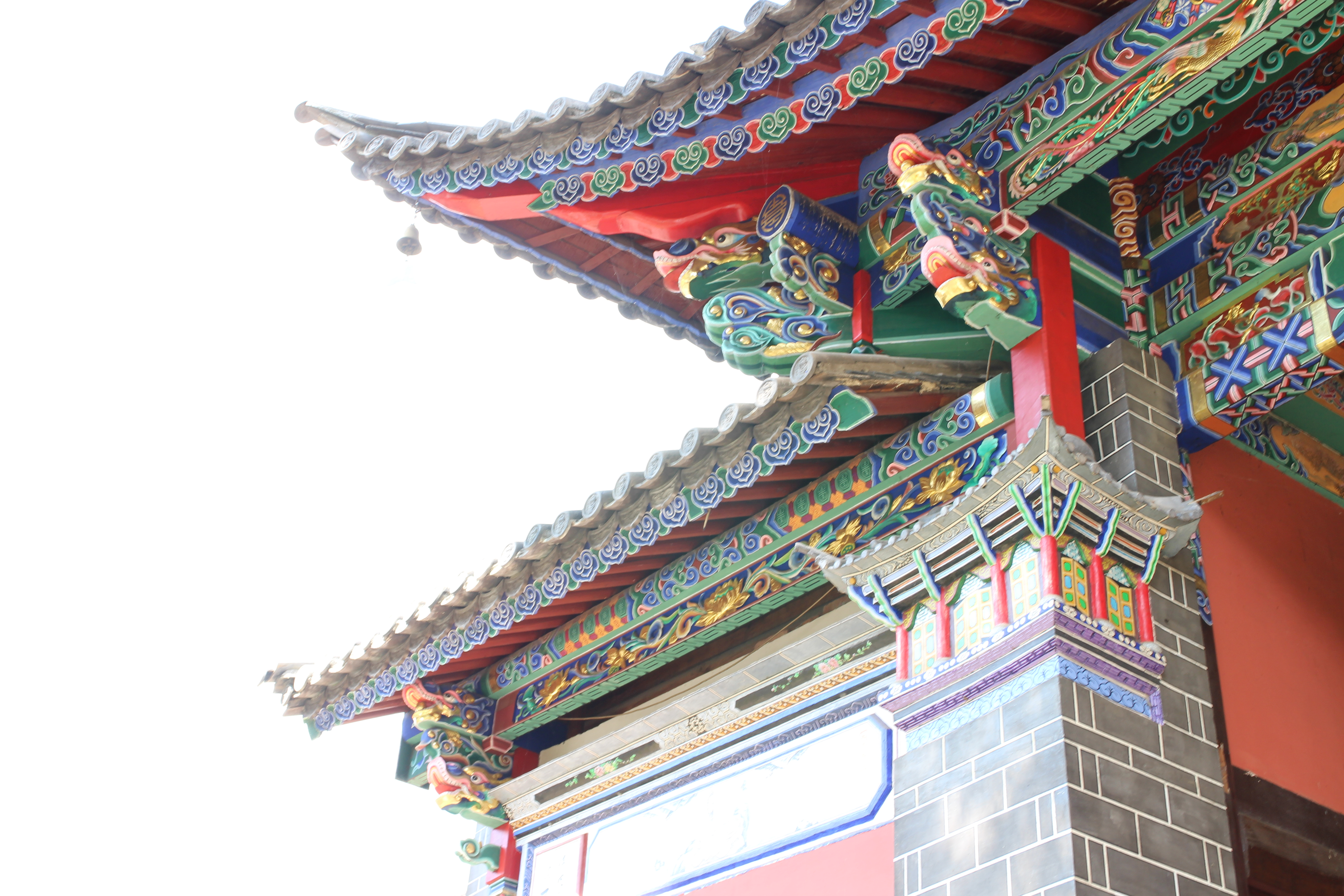
- Eave, Zhusheng Temple.

- Location within Yunnan

Religion
- Affiliation: Buddhism
- Sect: Chan Buddhism
- Leadership: Hongsheng (宏盛)

Location
- Location: Binchuan County, Yunnan
- Country: China
- Interactive map of Zhusheng Temple
- Coordinates: 25°57′50″N 100°23′55″E

Architecture
- Style: Chinese architecture
- Funded by: Hsu Yun
- Established: Jiajing period
- Completed: 1909

Zhusheng Temple (simplified Chinese: 祝圣寺; traditional Chinese: 祝聖寺; pinyin: Zhùshèng Sì), also known as Boyu'an (钵盂庵; 缽盂庵), is a Buddhist temple located at the foot of Mount Jizu, in Binchuan County, Yunnan.

== History ==
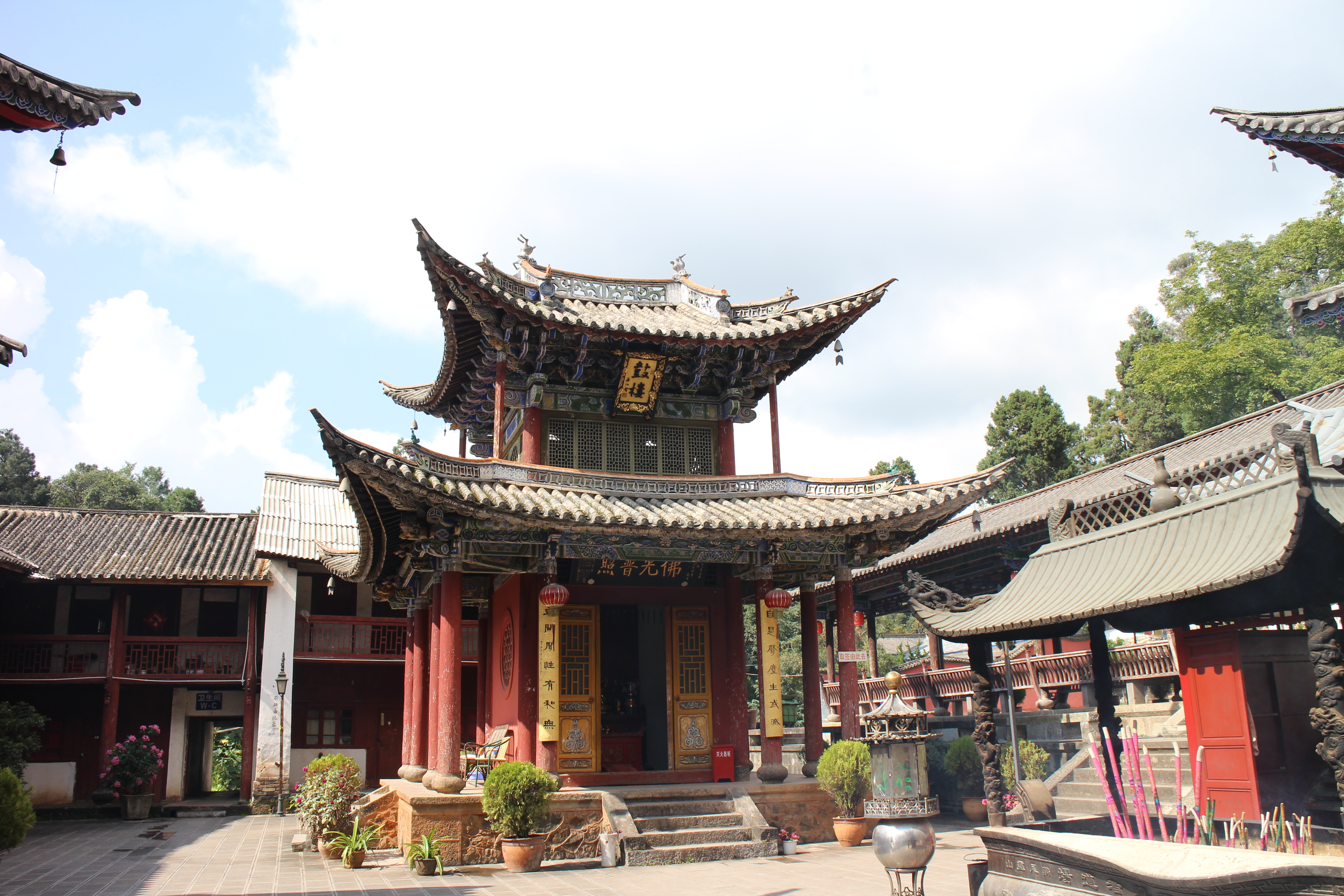
Drum Tower.

Zhusheng Temple traces its origins to the former Yingxiang Temple (迎祥寺), founded in the Jiajing period (1522–1566) of the Ming dynasty (1368–1644) and would later become Zhusheng Temple in 1909, two years before the fall of the Qing dynasty (1644–1911).

In 1904, Hsu Yun resided in the temple, where he taught Chan Buddhism for 7 years, and repaired and redecorated some buildings and halls. Guangxu Emperor bestowed a set of Dragon-store (龙藏) on the temple and honored the name "Huguo Zhusheng Chan Temple" (护国祝圣禅寺).

After the founding of the Communist State, Zhusheng Temple underwent three renovations, respectively in 1952, 1963 and 1980. The temple was slightly damaged during the Cultural Revolution. In April 1984, it has been classified as a National Key Buddhist Temple in Han Chinese Area by the State Council of China. In November 1993, the temple was authorized as a provincial level cultural heritage by the Yunnan Provincial Government.

== Architecture ==
The extant buildings include the Shanmen, Four Heavenly Kings Hall, Mahavira Hall, Hall of Medicine King, Hall of Dharma Protectors, Hall of Ksitigarbha, Guru Hall, Buddhist Texts Library, Meditation Hall, Drum tower, Bell tower, Dining Hall, abbot's room, etc.

=== Mahavira Hall ===
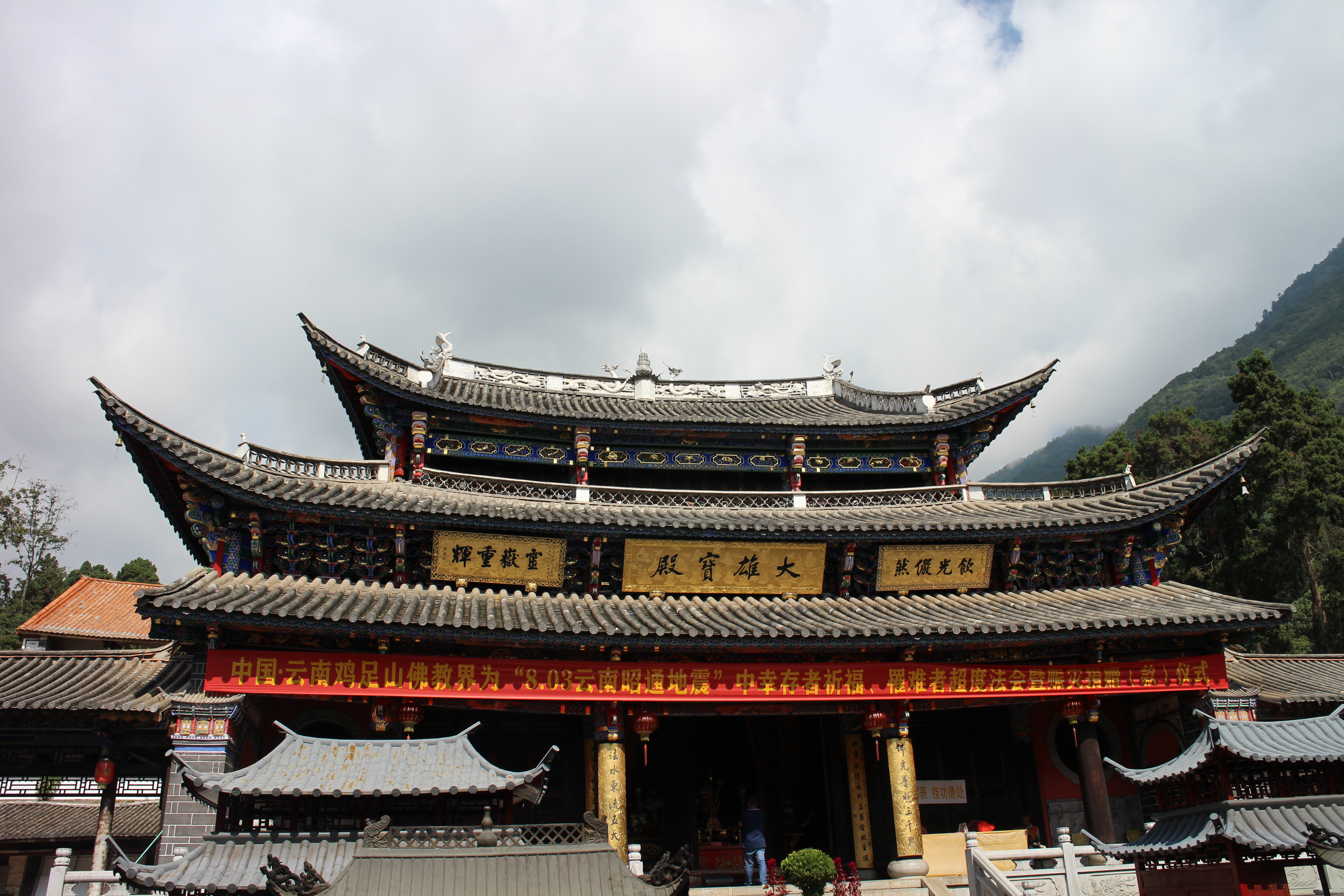
Mahavira Hall at Zhusheng Temple.

The Mahavira Hall enshrines statues of Sakyamuni, Ananda and Kassapa Buddha. At the back of Sakyamuni's statue are statues of Guanyin, Longnü and Sudhana. Inner walls are painted with five hundred life-like arhats with different looks and manners. Three plaques are hung on the eaves, written by Sun Yat-sen, Liang Qichao and Zhao Puchu respectively.
