= Xiaguan, Dali City =

Town in Yunnan, China

Coordinates: 25°36′N 100°14′E

Xiaguan 下关
- Subdistrict
- Location of Xiaguan in Dali City
- Interactive map of Xiaguan
- Country: China
- Province: Yunnan
- Autonomous prefecture: Dali
- County-level city: Dali City

Xiaguan (Chinese: 下关; pinyin: Xiàguān), formerly romanized as Hsiakwan, is a subdistrict at the southern end of Erhai Lake in Dali Prefecture, Yunnan, China. Xiaguan has a population of 146,517 (2020) and is the modern centre of the county-level city of Dali.

Xiaguan has been the principal point of entry for the region since the creation of the Burma Road and has become the major city and industrial centre of the county. As with most county seats in China, Xiaguan is often referred to by the county name, "Dali". To distinguish it from the county's eponymous Dali Town, it is sometimes called "New Dali" or "Dali New Town".

It is about 10 km (6.2 mi) south of Old Dali (Dali Town) by bus.

== Transportation ==
Xiaguan is connected to Kunming and Myanmar by the Hangrui Expressway (G56), with Lijiang by the Dali Expressway (G56₁₁), and with Dali's old town by Hwy 214.

== See also ==
- Dali City
