= China National Highway 214 =

Road in China

National Highway 214
- 214国道

Route information
- Length: 3,256 km (2,023 mi)

Major junctions
- From: Xining, Qinghai
- To: Menghai, Yunnan

Location
- Country: China

Highway system
- National Trunk Highway System; Primary; Auxiliary
← G213	→ G215

China National Highway 214 (G214) runs from Xining, Qinghai to Jinghong, Yunnan. It is 3,256 kilometres in length and runs south from Xining towards Tibet, and ends in Yunnan Province. From Zogang to Markam it shares the highway with G318.

== Route and distance ==
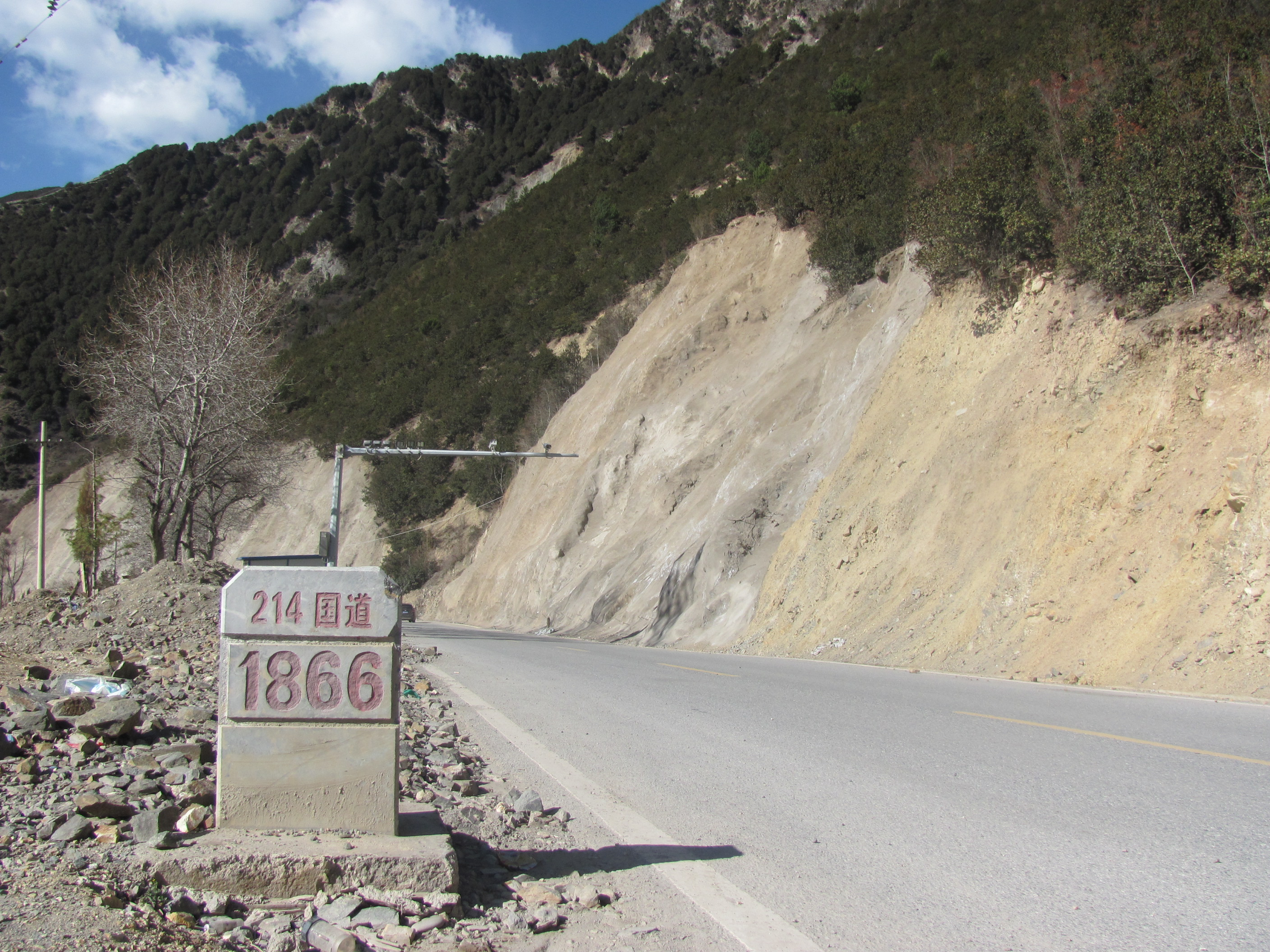
Deqin, Yunnan

Route and distance

City	Distance (km)
Xining, Qinghai	0
Huangyuan, Qinghai	49
Gonghe County, Qinghai	142
Madoi, Qinghai	484
Yushu, Qinghai	821
Nangqên, Qinghai	1021
Riwoqê County, Tibet Autonomous Region	1215
Chamdo, Tibet Autonomous Region	1320
Zogang County, Tibet Autonomous Region	1598
Markam County, Tibet Autonomous Region	1756
Deqin, Yunnan	1978
Shangri-La County, Yunnan	2162
Jianchuan, Yunnan	2344
Dali Old Town, Yunnan	
Dali	2470
Midu, Yunnan	2526
Nanjian, Yunnan	2570
Yunxian, Yunnan	2734
Lincang, Yunnan	2820
Shuangjiang, Yunnan	2920
Lancang, Yunnan	3084
Jinghong, Yunnan	3203
Menghai, Yunnan	3256

== See also ==
- China National Highways
