= Dali City =

City in Yunnan, China

Dali 大理市 · Dallit sil
- County-level city
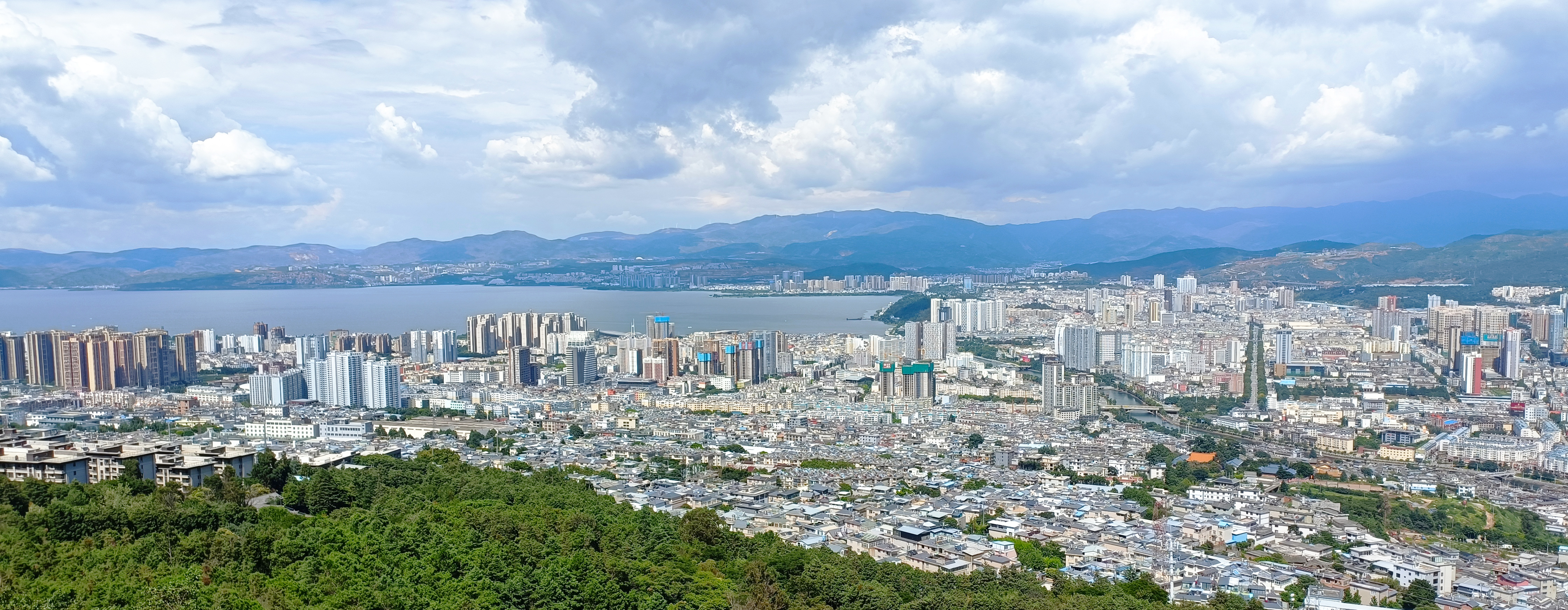
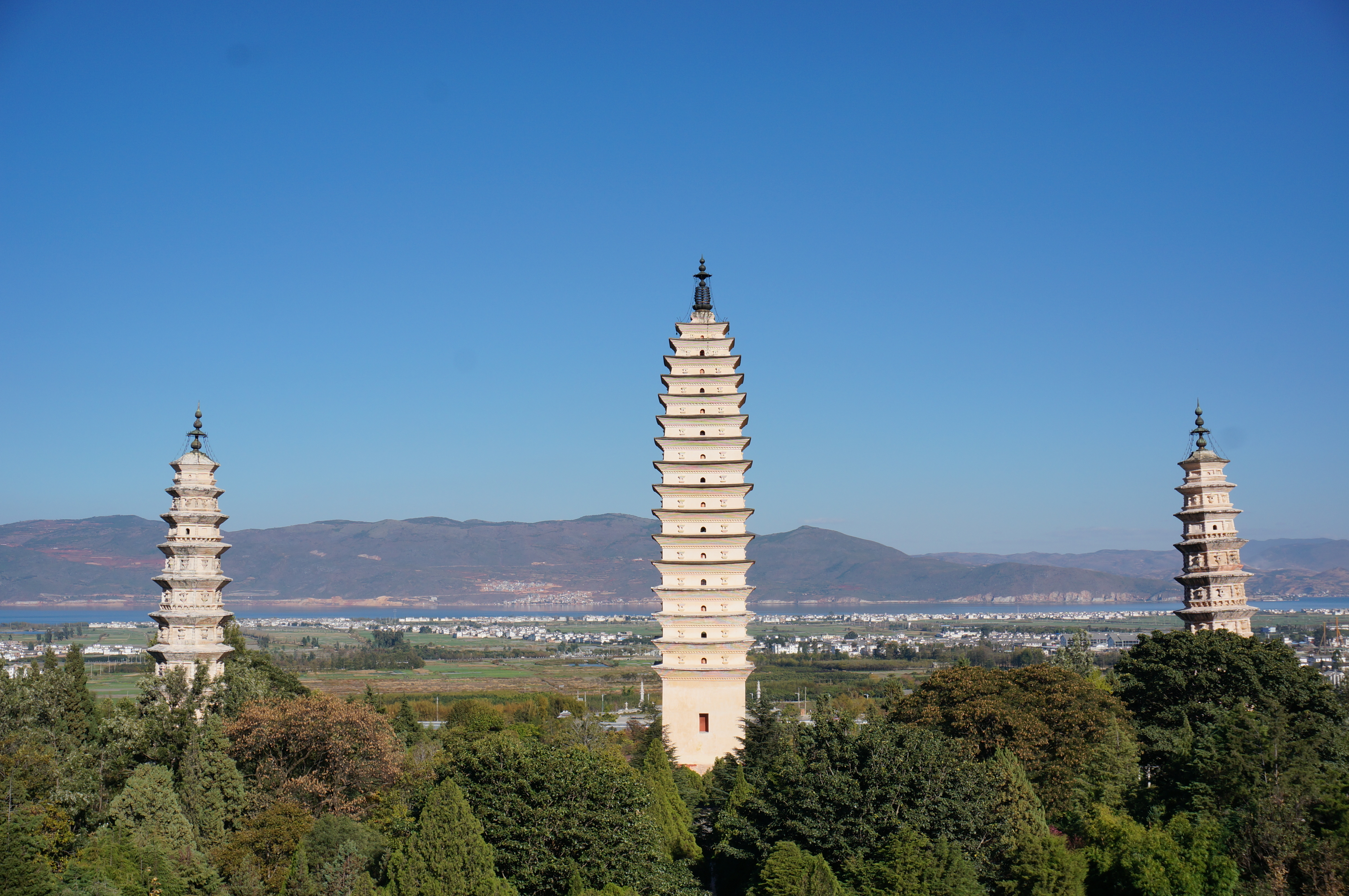
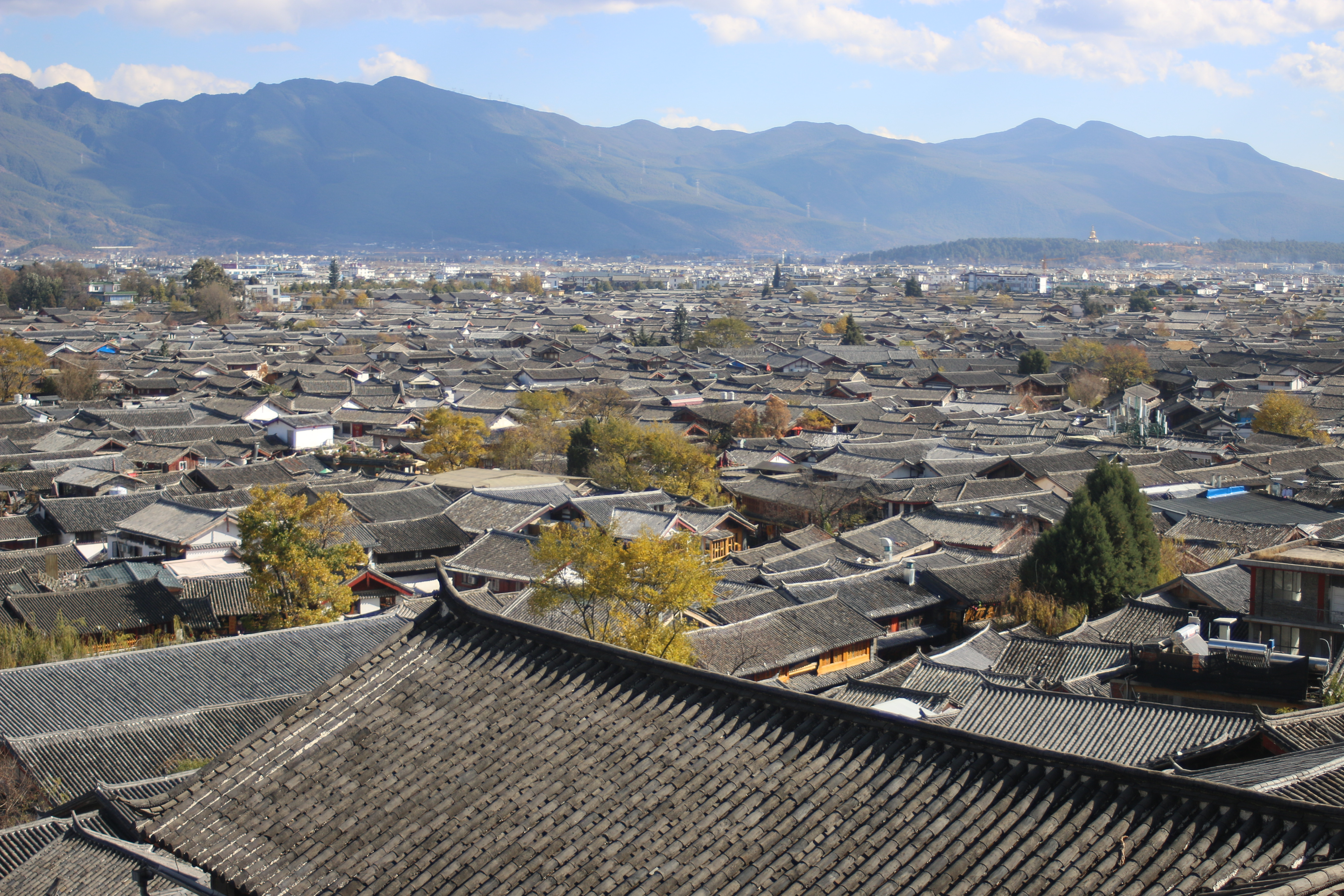
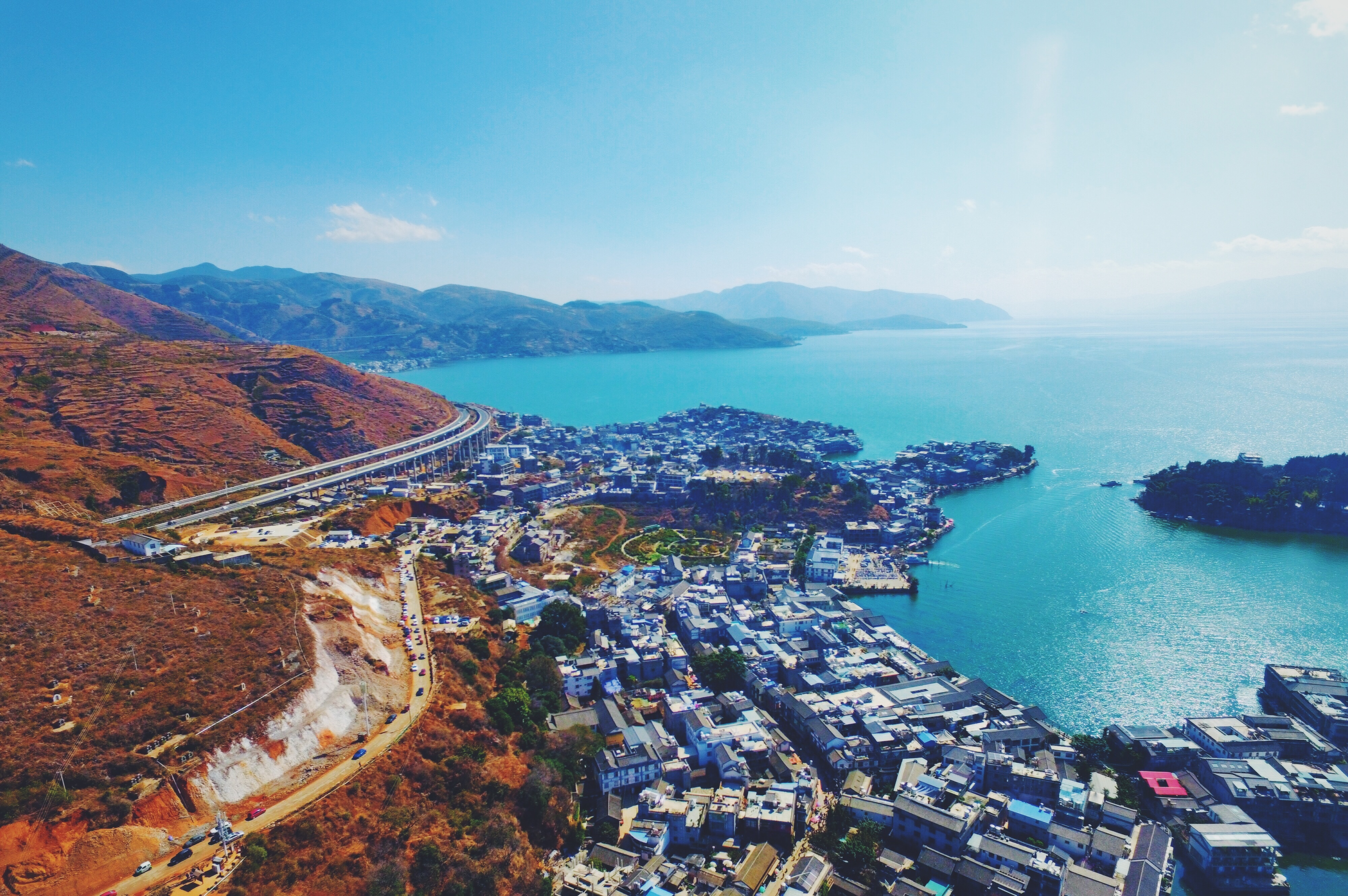
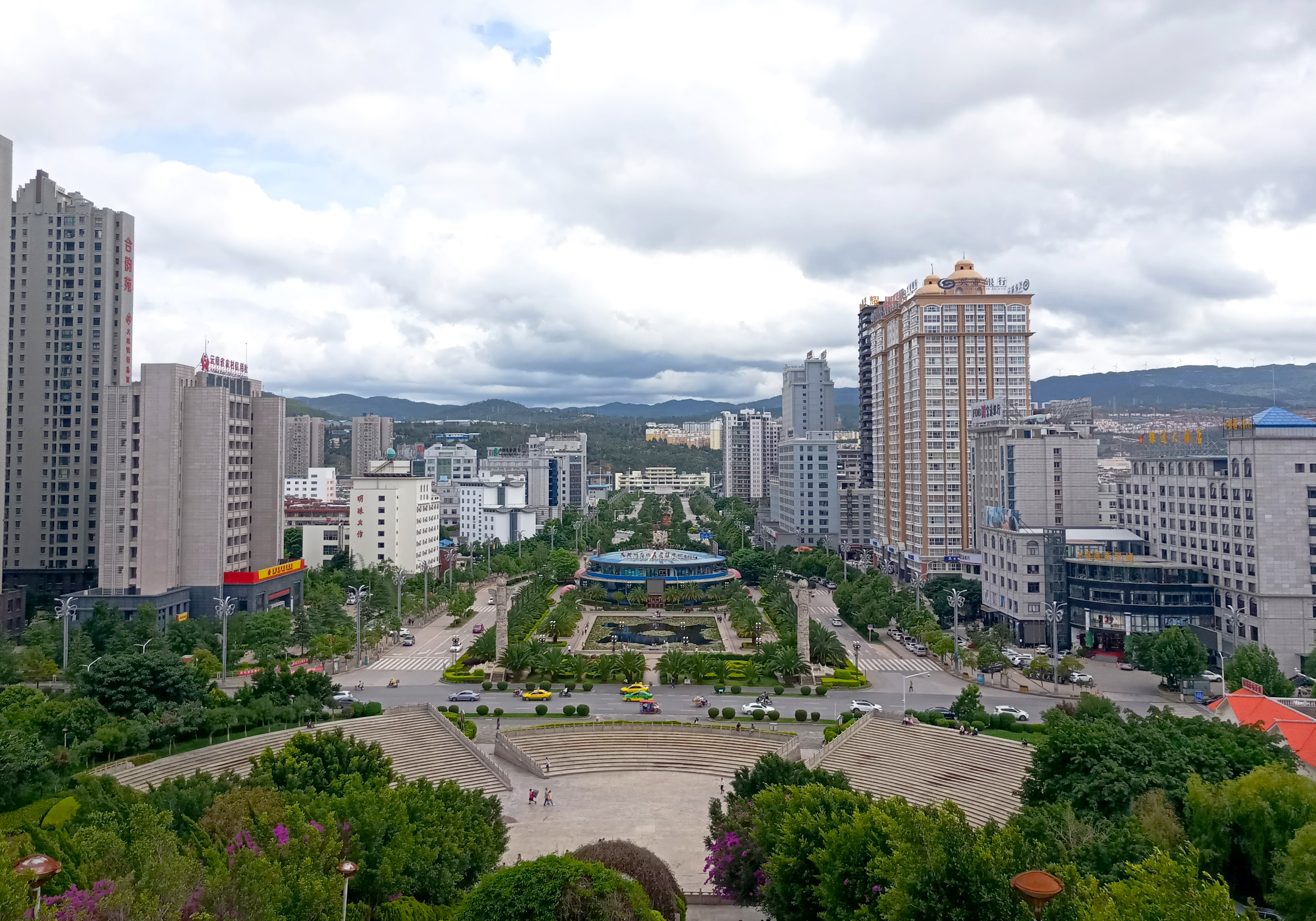
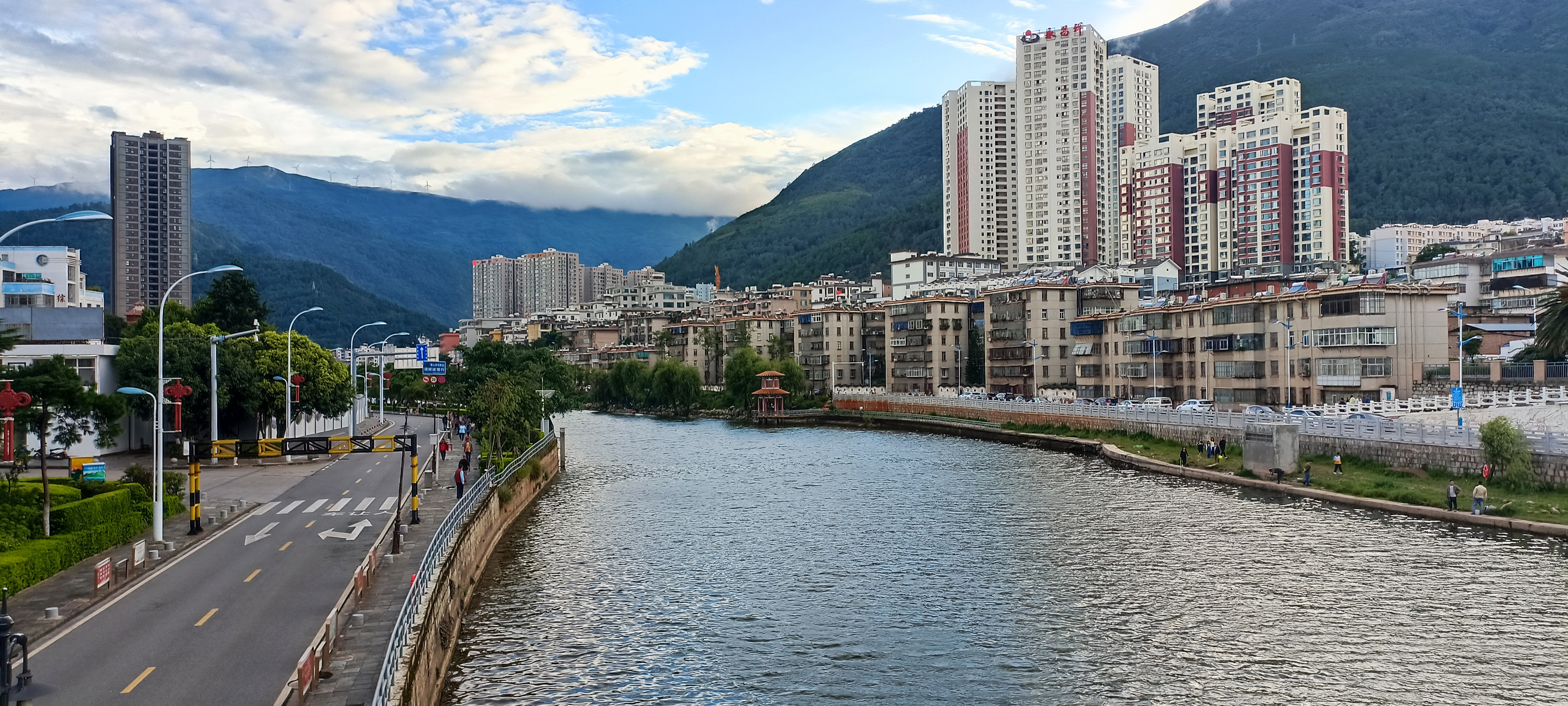
- View of Xiaguan Three Pagodas Dali Town Erhai Lake in Shuanglang Yunling Avenue Xi'er River

- Locations of Dali City (red) and Dali Prefecture (pink) within Yunnan and China

- Location in Yunnan Dali (China)
- Coordinates (Dali Prefecture government): 25°40′52″N 100°18′01″E
- Country: China
- Province: Yunnan
- Autonomous prefecture: Dali
- Municipal seat: Haidong

Area
  - Total: 1,738.63 km^{2} (671.29 sq mi)
- Elevation: 1,975 m (6,480 ft)

Population (2021)
  - Total: 771,128
  - Density: 443.5/km^{2} (1,149/sq mi)
- Time zone: UTC+8 (China Standard)
- Postal code: 671003
- Area code: 0872
- Climate: Cwb
- Website: www.yndali.gov.cn

Dali City
- Chinese: 大理市
- Literal meaning: "Great reason"
Transcriptions
Standard Mandarin
- Hanyu Pinyin: Dàlǐ shì

Dali City (Chinese: 大理市, Bai: Dallit sil or Guiphet) is the county-level seat of the Dali Bai Autonomous Prefecture in northwestern Yunnan, China. Dali City is administered through 12 township-level districts, two of which are also commonly referred to as Dali.

Xiaguan (下关) is the modern city centre and usually conflated with Dali City by virtue of being its seat. This subdistrict is the destination of most long-distance transportation heading to Dali and is sometimes referred to as Dali New Town (大理新镇) to avoid confusion.

Dali Town (大理镇), formerly known as Tali, (Note: The name has also been romanized as Ta-le or Ta-le Foo) is another division of Dali City, located 10 km (6.2 mi) north of Xiaguan. This town, commonly referred to as Dali Old Town (大理古城) to distinguish it from the city seat in Xiaguan, is usually the Dali referred to in tourist publications. The old town is one of the most popular tourist destinations in Yunnan, known for its natural scenery, historical and cultural heritage, and vibrant nightlife.

== Geography ==
Dali City is located in western Yunnan, approximately 250 km (160 mi) northwest of the provincial capital of Kunming.

Dali is situated in the transition area between the dramatic valleys of the Hengduan ranges on the eastern edge of the Tibetan Plateau and the distinctive mountains of the western Yungui Plateau. The county-level city surrounds Erhai Lake between the Cang Mountains to the west and Mount Jizu to the east. The county seat at Xiaguan is located at the outlet of the lake into the Yangbi River. Dali Old Town is situated on a fertile plain between the Cang Range and Erhai. This plain has traditionally been settled by the Bai and Yi minorities.

Dali City borders Binchuan County, Xiangyun County and Heqing County to the east, Weishan County and Midu County to the south, Yangbi County to the west, and Eryuan County to the north.

== Climate ==
Its low latitude tempered by its high elevation, Dali has a mild subtropical highland climate (Köppen Cwb) with short, mild, dry winters and warm, rainy summers. Frost may occur in winter but the days still generally warm up to 16 °C (61 °F) or more. During summer, a majority of the days features some rainfall and daytime temperatures rise to 25 °C (77 °F). A great majority of the year's rainfall occurs from June to October. December 2013 was particularly marked for its high snowfall.

Climate data for Dali, elevation 1,978 m (6,490 ft), (1991–2020 normals, extremes 1971–present)
Month	Jan	Feb	Mar	Apr	May	Jun	Jul	Aug	Sep	Oct	Nov	Dec	Year
Record high °C (°F)	23.3 (73.9)	25.5 (77.9)	27.1 (80.8)	29.5 (85.1)	31.4 (88.5)	32.3 (90.1)	30.3 (86.5)	30.8 (87.4)	28.8 (83.8)	27.5 (81.5)	26.7 (80.1)	24.5 (76.1)	32.3 (90.1)
Mean daily maximum °C (°F)	15.9 (60.6)	17.8 (64.0)	20.5 (68.9)	23.2 (73.8)	24.8 (76.6)	25.7 (78.3)	24.9 (76.8)	24.9 (76.8)	23.9 (75.0)	21.8 (71.2)	18.9 (66.0)	16.5 (61.7)	21.6 (70.8)
Daily mean °C (°F)	8.9 (48.0)	11.0 (51.8)	13.9 (57.0)	16.7 (62.1)	19.0 (66.2)	20.6 (69.1)	20.1 (68.2)	19.6 (67.3)	18.3 (64.9)	16.0 (60.8)	11.9 (53.4)	8.8 (47.8)	15.4 (59.7)
Mean daily minimum °C (°F)	3.1 (37.6)	4.9 (40.8)	7.8 (46.0)	10.7 (51.3)	13.9 (57.0)	16.7 (62.1)	16.8 (62.2)	16.3 (61.3)	14.9 (58.8)	12.3 (54.1)	7.1 (44.8)	3.5 (38.3)	10.7 (51.2)
Record low °C (°F)	−3.7 (25.3)	−2.6 (27.3)	−2.4 (27.7)	1.0 (33.8)	5.6 (42.1)	8.5 (47.3)	11.4 (52.5)	10.5 (50.9)	6.1 (43.0)	4.2 (39.6)	0.1 (32.2)	−4.3 (24.3)	−4.3 (24.3)
Average precipitation mm (inches)	29.3 (1.15)	28.2 (1.11)	34.2 (1.35)	27.6 (1.09)	82.5 (3.25)	131.3 (5.17)	199.7 (7.86)	220.4 (8.68)	157.3 (6.19)	91.8 (3.61)	24.6 (0.97)	11.1 (0.44)	1,038 (40.87)
Average precipitation days (≥ 0.1 mm)	4.2	5.6	8.0	9.0	10.7	14.7	19.4	19.0	17.5	12.9	5.0	2.6	128.6
Average snowy days	0.5	0.4	0.3	0.1	0	0	0	0	0	0	0.1	0.2	1.6
Average relative humidity (%)	55	51	49	53	63	74	82	83	82	77	69	64	67
Mean monthly sunshine hours	230.8	211.7	226.1	211.1	202.1	160.5	123.0	129.0	127.3	155.0	207.2	233.0	2,216.8
Percentage possible sunshine	69	66	60	55	49	39	30	32	35	44	64	72	51
Source 1: China Meteorological AdministrationNOAAall-time November record high
Source 2: Weather China

== Administrative divisions ==
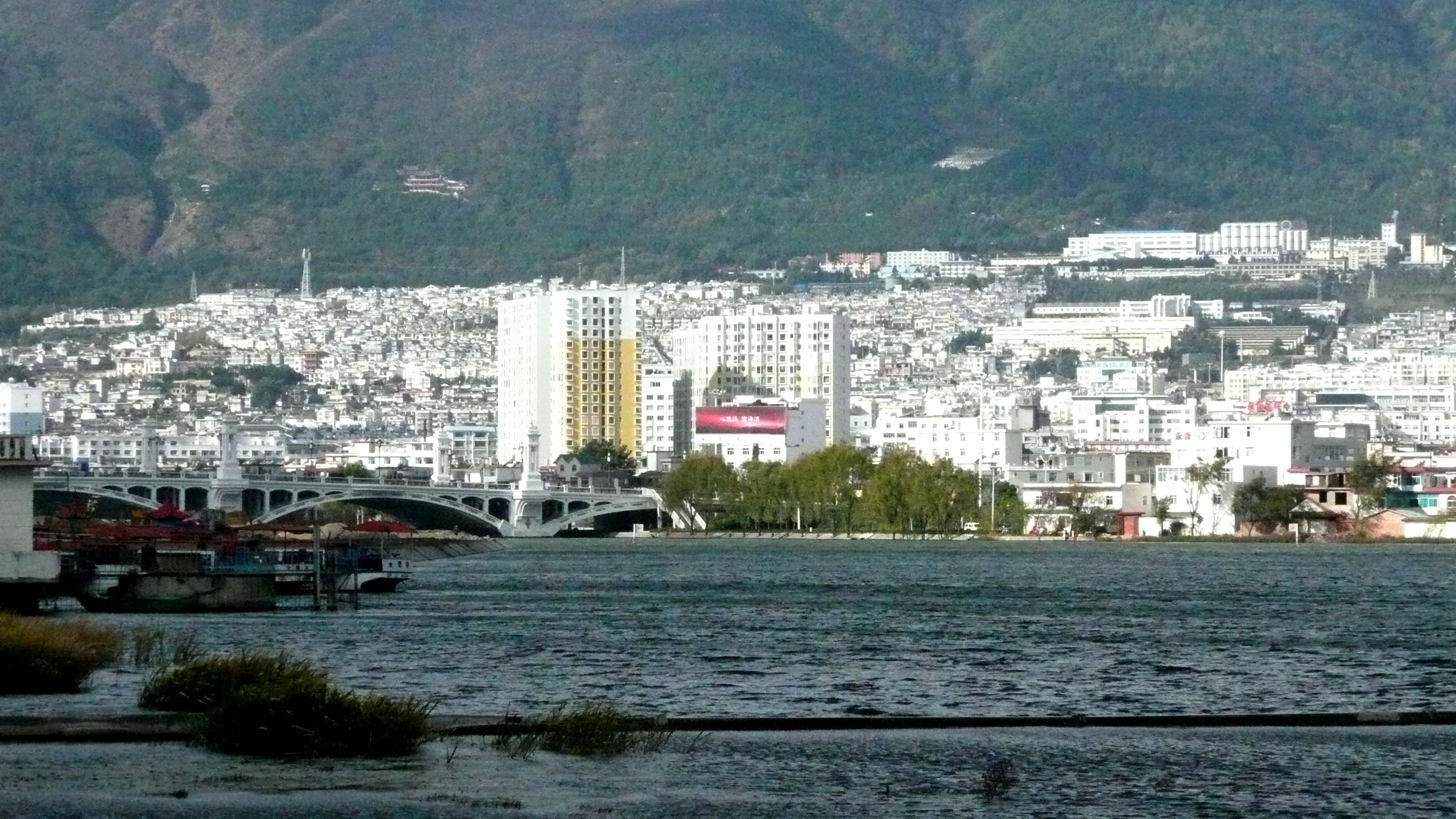
Xiaguan Subdistrict, the city's and economic, administrative, and transportation center.

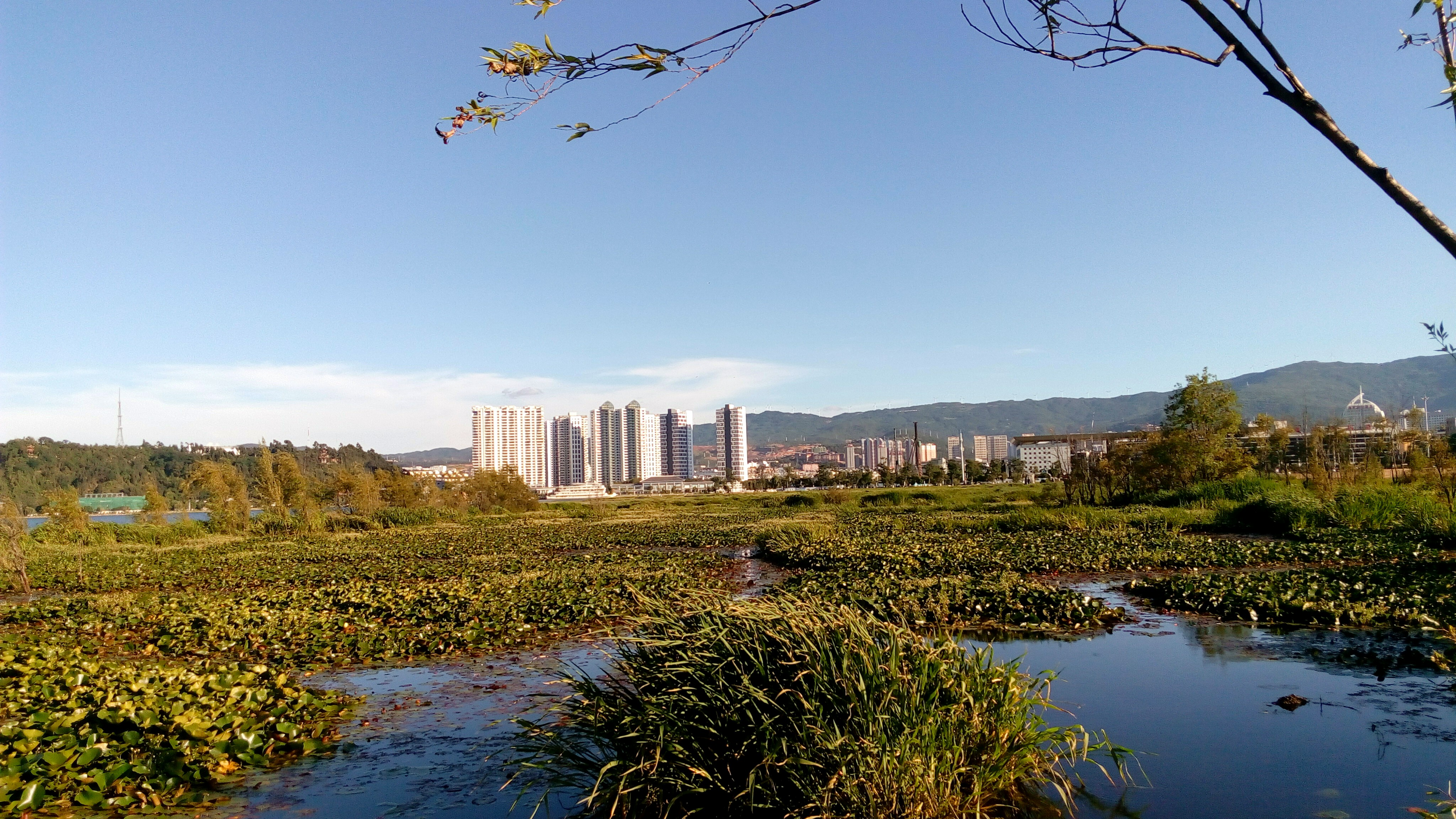
Cityscape of Dali beside Erhai Lake

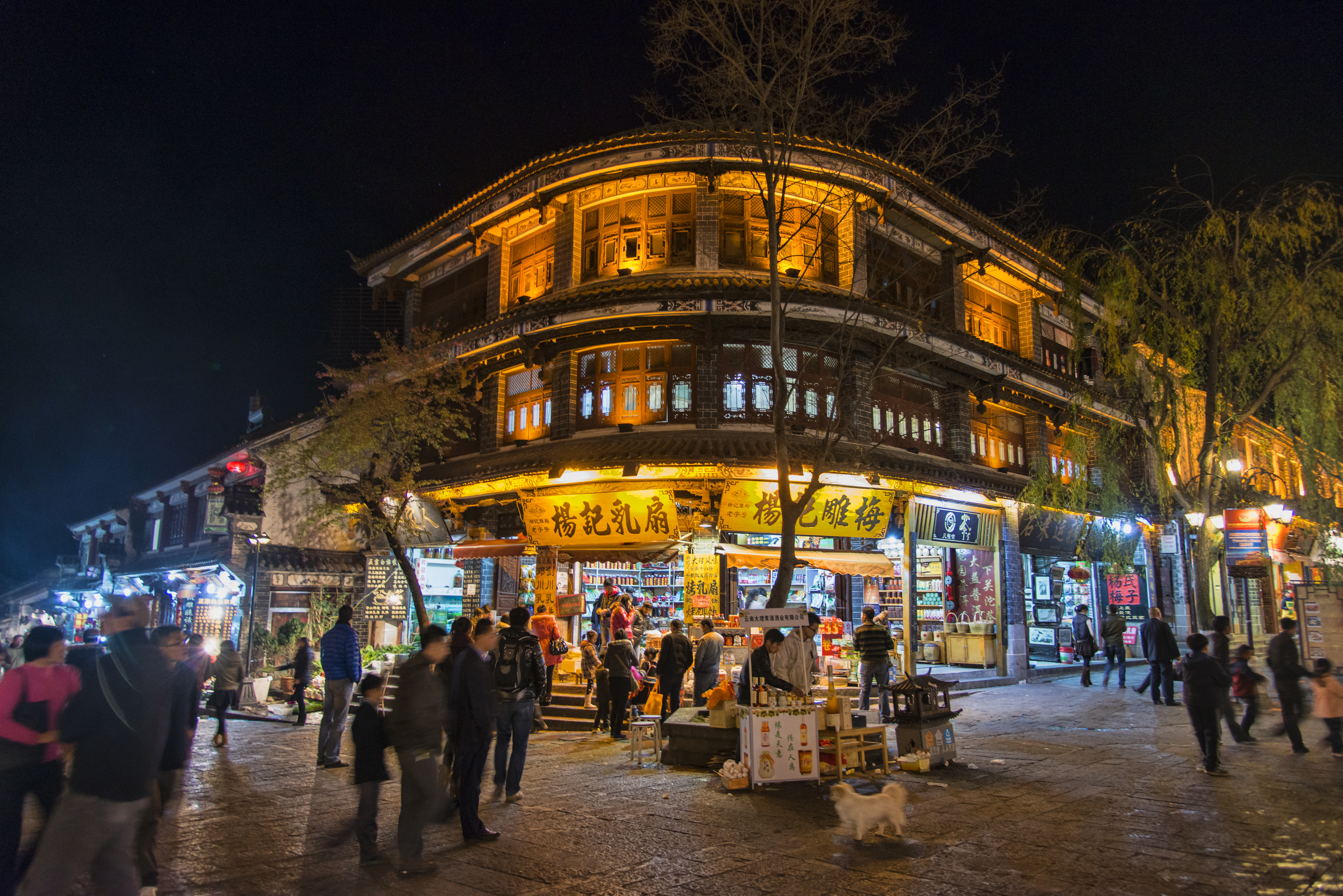
Night view of the old town

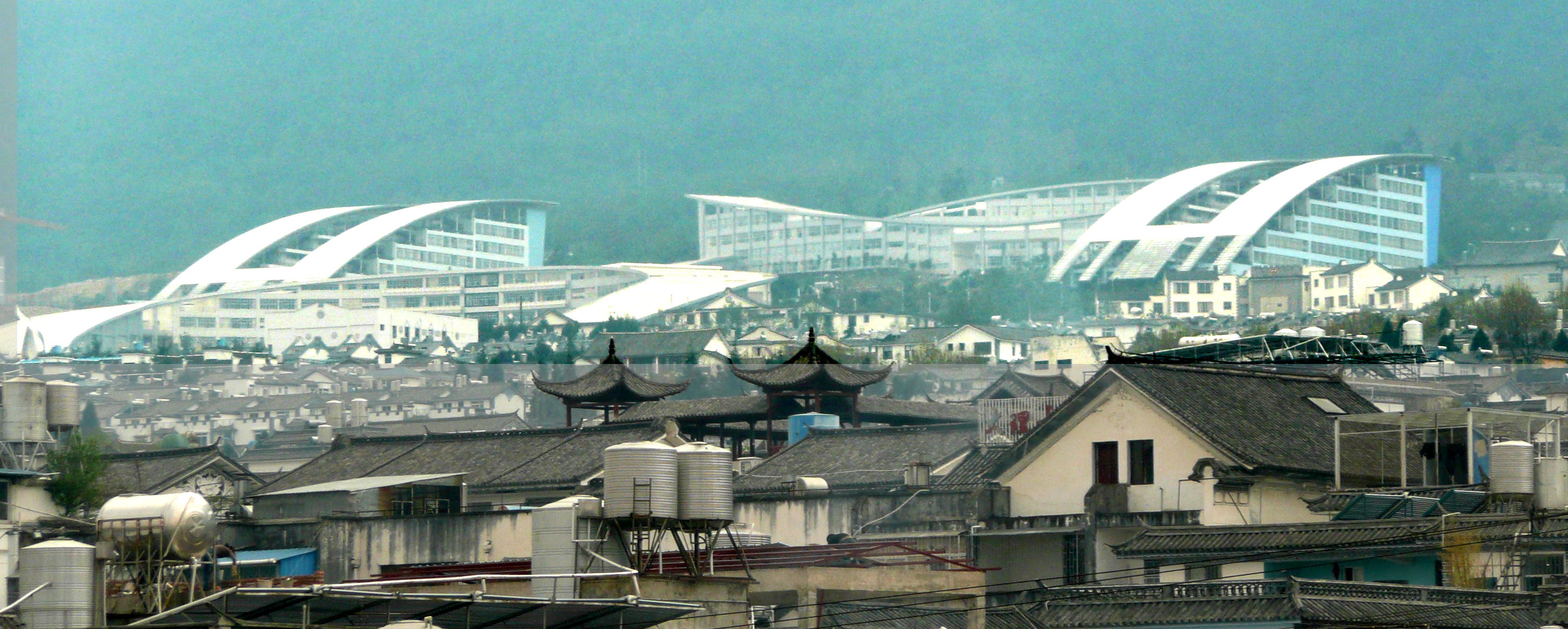
Dali University

Dali City has 3 subdistricts, 9 towns and 1 ethnic township.

3 subdistricts

- Xiaguan (下关街道)
- Taihe (太和街道)
- Manjiang (满江街道)

9 towns

- Dali Town (大理镇)
- Fengyi Town (凤仪镇)
- Xizhou Town (喜洲镇)
- Haidong Town (海东镇)
- Wase Town (挖色镇)
- Wanqiao Town (湾桥镇)
- Yinqiao Town (银桥镇)
- Shuanglang Town (双廊镇)
- Shangguan Town (上关镇)

1 ethnic township

- Taiyi Yi Ethnic Township (太邑彝族乡)

Former
Qiliqiao Town (七里桥镇)

Map

== History ==
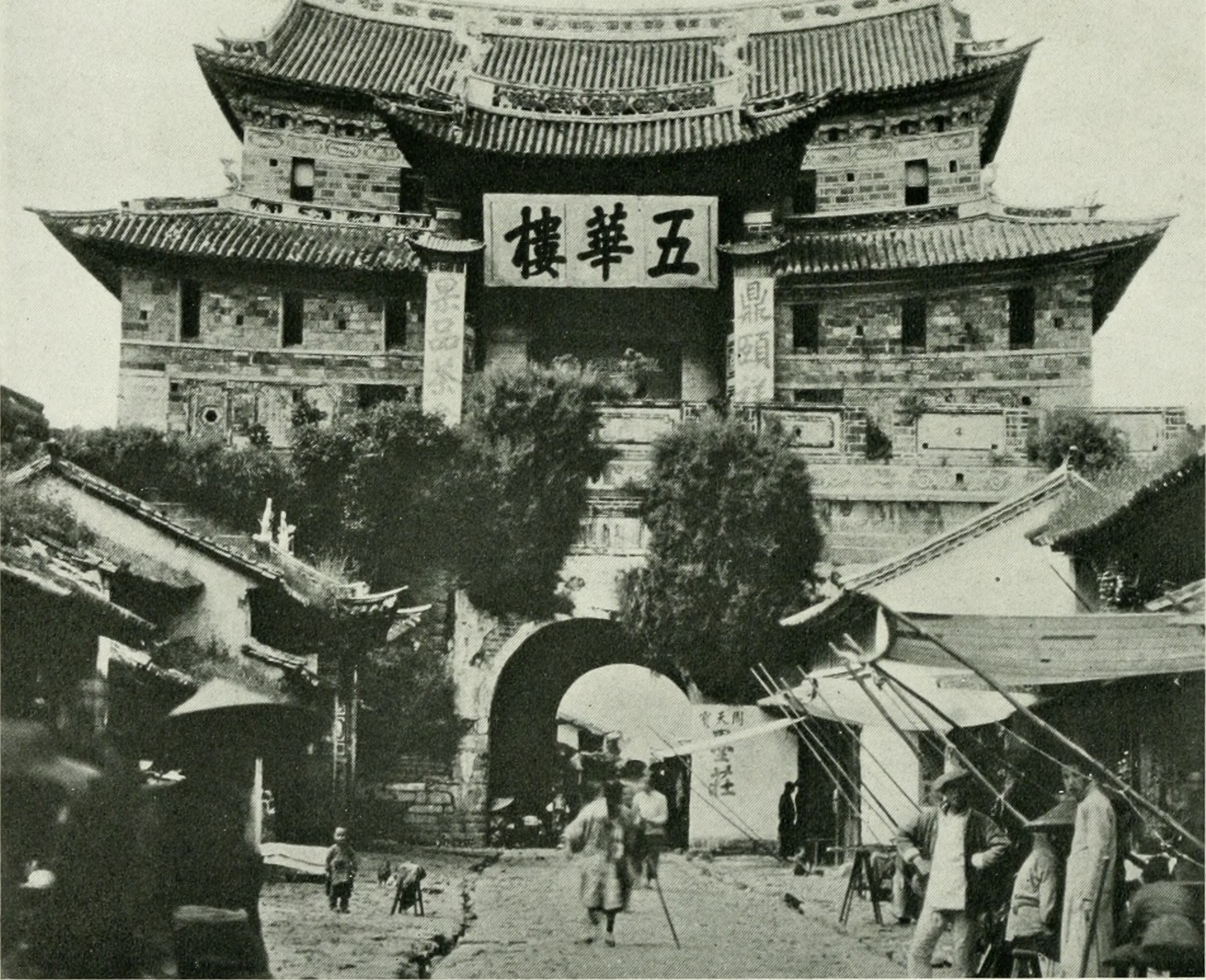
Dali's Wuhualou in 1918.

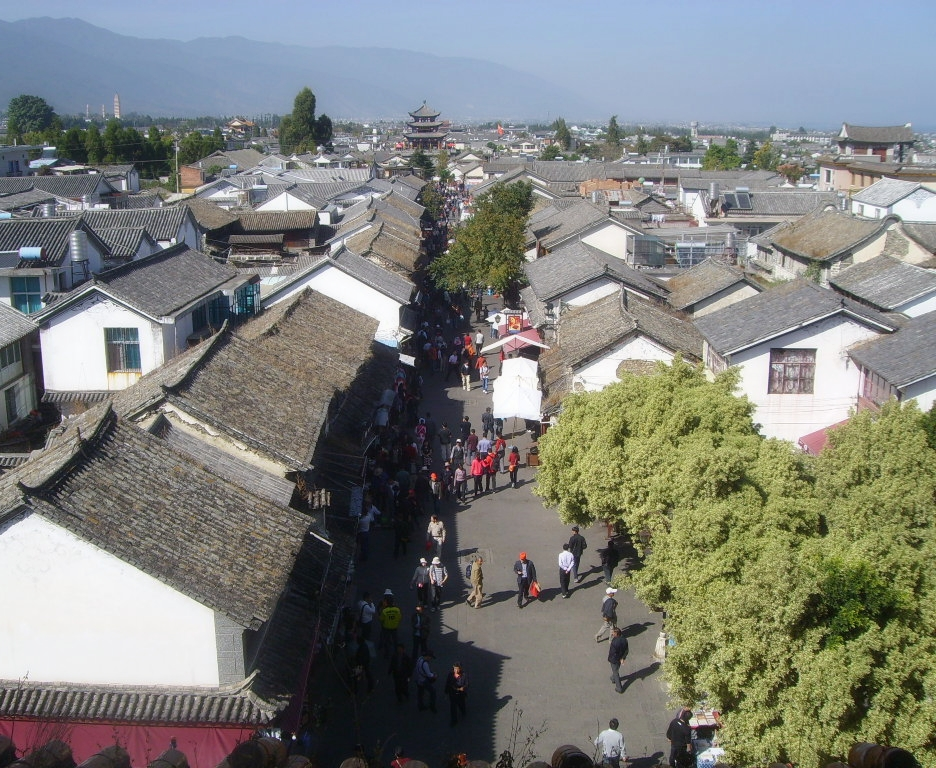
Dali Old Town, with Chongsheng Pagoda and the Cangshan range

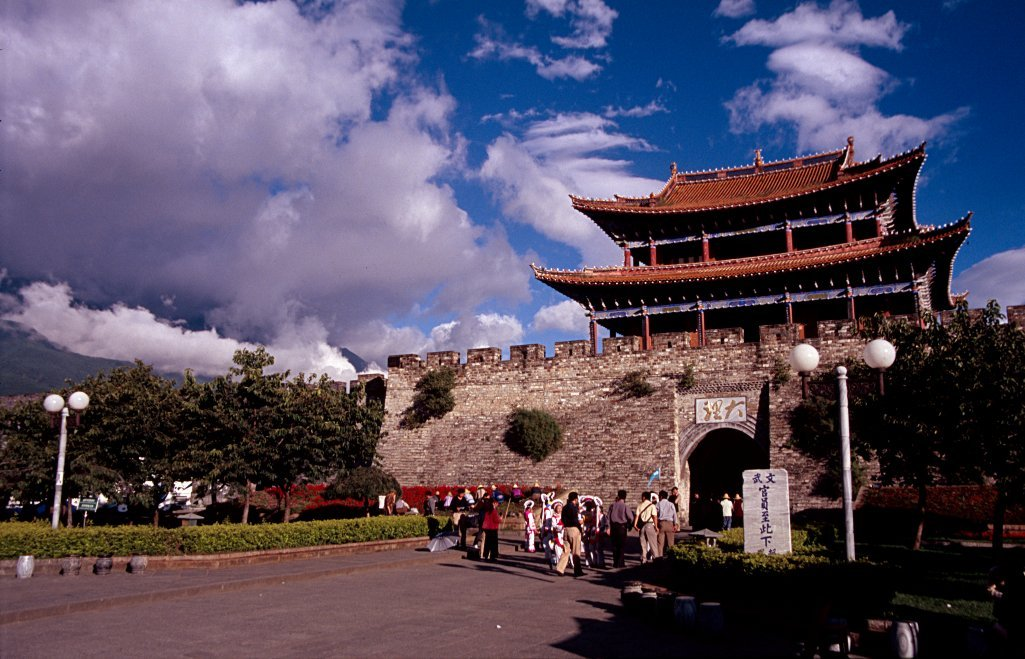
South gate of the ancient city of Dali

The Dali area was formerly known as Xiemie (苴咩; Xiémiē). The old town was the medieval capital of both the Bai kingdom Nanzhao (779–902) and the Kingdom of Dali (937–1253). That city was razed and its records burnt during its conquest by China's Yuan Dynasty. The present old town was organized in the late 14th century under the Hongwu Emperor of the Ming Dynasty. The area became significantly Muslim (Hui) under the Yuan and Ming and was the center of the Panthay Rebellion against the Qing from 1856 to 1863. It was severely damaged during a massive earthquake in 1925.

Rail and then air transport have permitted the area (particularly Dali Old Town) to become accessible to tourists in the 20th century. It is now one of China's official tourist cities and, along with nearby Lijiang, one of the most popular towns. In order to preserve the appeal of the old town, industrial development is restricted to newer townships such as Xiaguan. Building codes mandate that new construction in the old town and surrounding countryside must conform to the traditional Chinese style, with tiled roofs and bricks, plaster, or white-washed walls.

== Economy ==
Much of the local economy now revolves around tourism and services catering to travelers.

Historically, Dali was able to control some of the trade between India and China and independently famed for the woodworkers of the town of Xizhou and for its high-quality marble, used both for construction and decorative objects. It was so prominent in the latter that the modern Chinese word for marble is literally "Dali stone" (大理石; dàlǐshí).

There is also local tea.

== Culture ==
- Third Month Fair (Sanyue Jie)

== Transportation ==
=== Local transport ===
Local transport includes buses, taxis, bicycles, and boats on Erhai Lake. Local busses 4 & 8 provide service from Xiaguan to the old town (1 hr). Tourists often rent bicycles from one of the many rental stores in the old town and explore the region by bike, for instance on a special bike trail around the Erhai lake.

=== Air ===
Dali Fengyi Airport (DLU) is a domestic airport about 13 km (8.1 mi) east of Xiaguan on Weishan or Airport Rd. Taxis run about 60 RMB to Xiaguan or 90 RMB to the old town. It services (as of 2014) Kunming (20 min), Xishuangbanna (25 min), Chongqing (70 min), Chengdu Shuangliu (80 min), Shanghai, Beijing, Shenzhen, Guangzhou, and Guiyuan.

=== Road ===
Dali (i.e., Xiaguan) is connected to Kunming and points east by the Hangrui Expressway (G56), which also runs west to Ruili on the Burmese border. The Dali Expressway (G56₁₁) is a spur connecting it with Lijiang. The road to the old town is China National Highway 214, which connects to the expressway to Lijiang north of the lake. It also runs south from Xiaguan to Menghai near the Burmese border.

Long-distance busses run from the old town's west gate to Kunming (about 4½ hrs), Lijiang, and Shangri-La. Every Monday, service is also available to Shaping for its market.

Long-distance busses run from Xiaguan's stations on Jianshe Road.

=== Rail ===
Dali has its own railway station with daily services to Kunming and Lijiang. Service to Kunming used to consist of one train during the day and two trains running overnight, with sleeper cars. Per July 2018 Dali is connected to Kunming with a modern high-speed train link with a frequency of one train per hour. As the railway network expands in Yunnan, train service will become available to Shangri-La County and Ruili in the future.

The standard gauge line from Kunming, China to Kyaukphyu port opened in 2021, with a station at Dali.

== Tourism ==
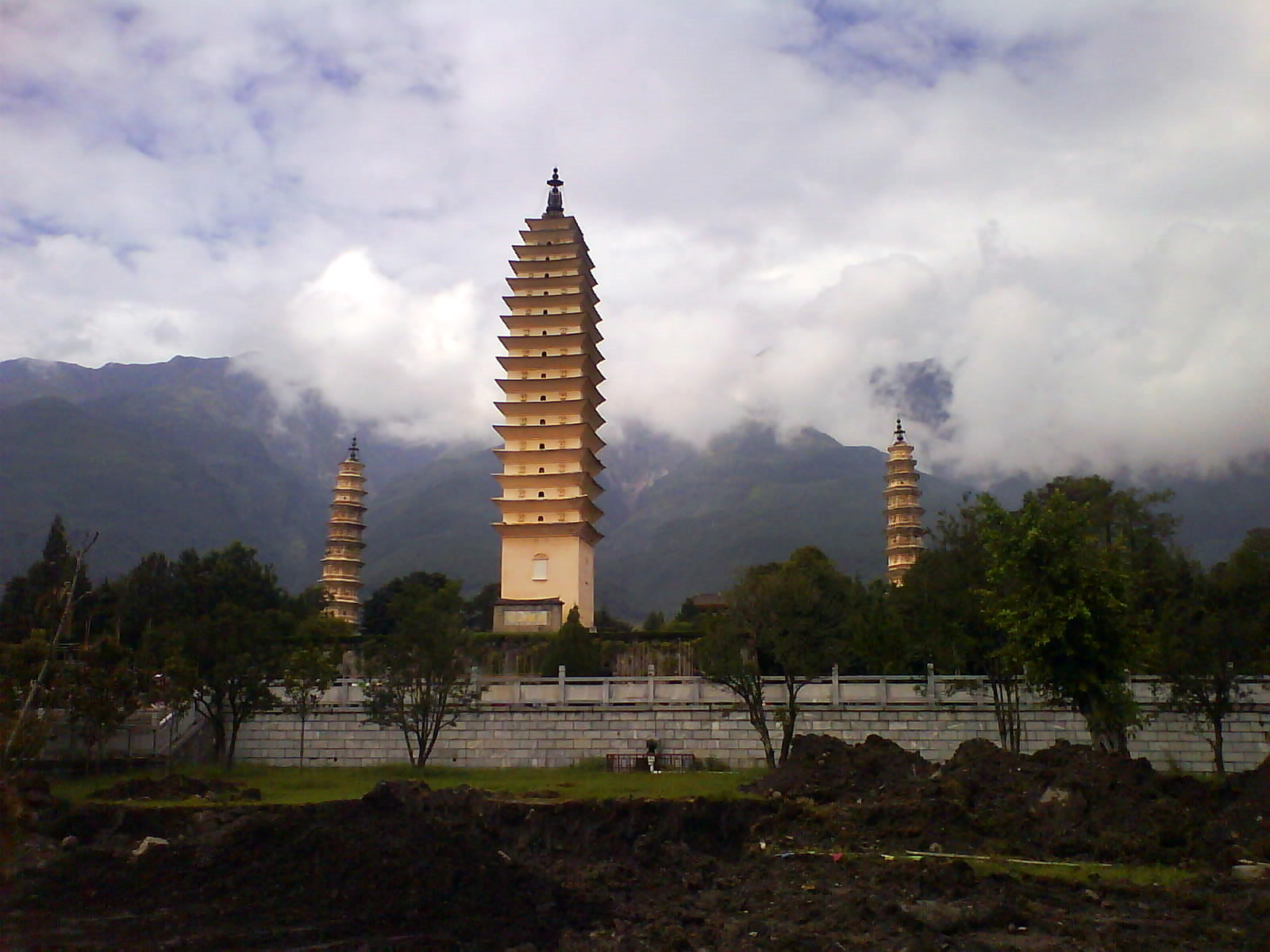
The Three Pagodas of Chong Sheng Temple

Dali is one of Yunnan's most popular tourist destinations. Sights include:

- Dali Municipal Museum (大理市博物馆): This centrally located museum houses permanent exhibitions on archaeological findings from the region, on paintings and on Buddhist sculptures.
- Three Pagodas and Chongsheng Temple
- Demi-Gods and Semi-Devils film city
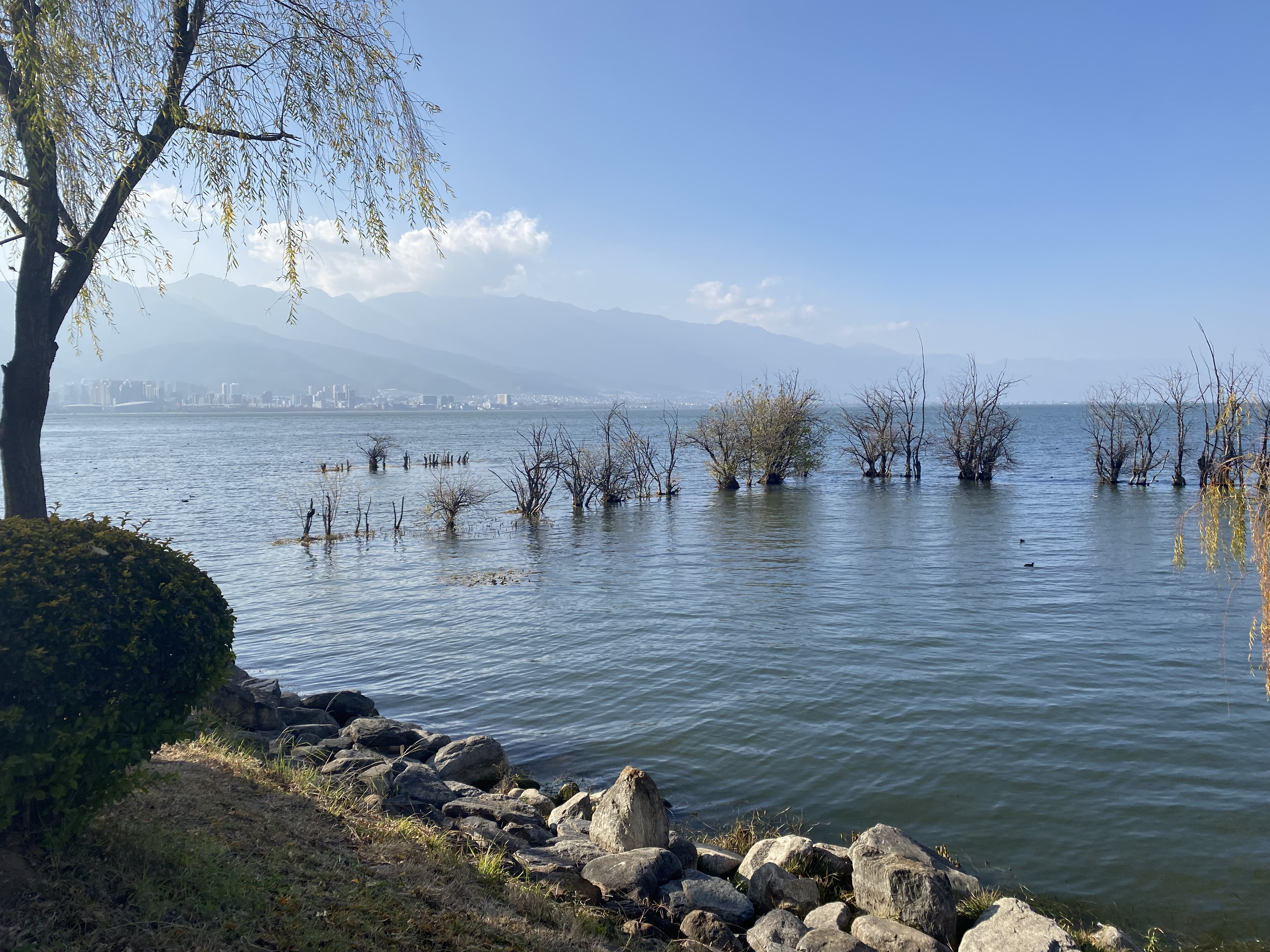
- Erhai Lake
  Xizhou: a historical town famed for its architecture and woodwork
- Shuang lang: on the east side of the lake, once a small fishing village, now a rather high-class tourist destination, most buildings and businesses having overtaken the village since 2012. The coast is now completely built up by tourism estates.
- Cang Mountain, west of the Old City and the Three Pagodas
- Stele in memory of Kublai Khan's conquest of Yunnan (元世祖平云南碑), erected on top of a large stone tortoise in Sanyue Lane (三月街) at the foot of the Cang Mountain, west of the Old City.
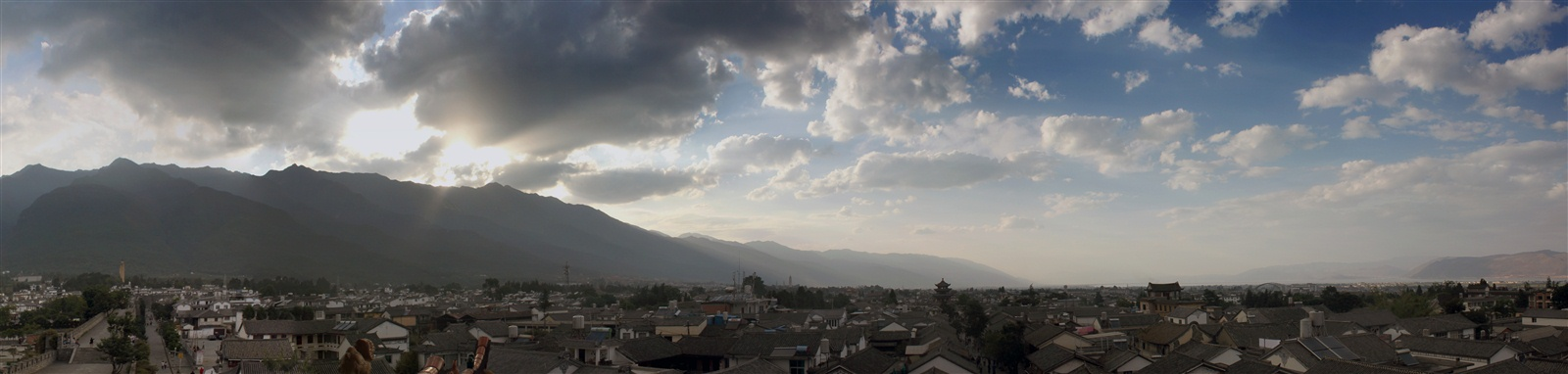
Dali Ancient Town
