= G56 Hangzhou–Ruili Expressway =

Road in China

Hangzhou–Ruili Expressway
- 杭州－瑞丽高速公路
- Hangrui Expressway 杭瑞高速公路

Route information
- Part of AH14
- Length: 2,935 km (1,824 mi)

Major junctions
- East end: G25 Changchun–Shenzhen Expressway and G2504 Hangzhou Ring Expressway, Hangzhou, Zhejiang
- West end: Ruili, Yunnan

Location
- Country: China

Highway system
- National Trunk Highway System; Primary; Auxiliary; National Highways; Transport in China
← G5518	→ G5601

The Hangzhou–Ruili Expressway (Chinese: 杭州—瑞丽高速公路), designated as G56 and commonly referred to as the Hangrui Expressway (Chinese: 杭瑞高速公路) is an east-west expressway in China that connects the cities of Hangzhou, Zhejiang, and Ruili, Yunnan, a city on the border with Burma. When complete, it will be 2,935 km (1,824 mi) in length. Running through mountainous terrain, it is notable for its several tunnels and bridges, including the very high Duge Bridge, Puli Bridge and Dimuhe River Bridge.

The expressway is complete in the provinces of Zhejiang, Anhui, and Jiangxi. The entire expressway in the provinces of Hubei, Hunan, Guizhou, and Yunnan is under construction except for sections from Changde to Jishou in Hunan and from the Guizhou border to Baoshan in Yunnan.

At Ruili, the expressway will connect to a border crossing to Muse, Myanmar and National Highway 3.

== Route ==
G56 Hangrui Expressway in Hubei Province

Hangzhou, Huangshan, Jingdezhen, Jiujiang, Xianning, Yueyang, Changde, Jishou, Zunyi, Bijie, Liupanshui, Qujing, Kunming, Chuxiong, Dali, Ruili

== Spurs ==
- G5611 Dali–Lijiang Expressway: connecting to Lijiang

== See also ==
- Burma Road, whose path the G56 often follows
