= Xizhou =

Xizhou is the atonal pinyin romanization of various Chinese words and names.

It may refer to:

- Xizhou, the Chinese name of the Western Zhou dynasty
- Xizhou, Xinjiang (西州), a former name of Turpan in Xinjiang
- Xizhou, Changhua (溪州鄉), in Changhua County on Taiwan
- Xizhou, Zhejiang (西周镇), a town in Xiangshan County, Zhejiang
- Xizhou, Dali (喜洲镇), a town in Dali City, Yunnan Province
- Xizhou, Hanshou (西洲乡), a township in Hanshou County, Hunan Province
