= Folk House =

Folk House may refer to:

- Blidworth Welfare F.C., formerly named Folk House Old Boys F.C. (1926–1982)
- Folk house, a style of house music
- China Folk House Retreat, a cultural center and folk house in Harpers Ferry, West Virginia, United States
