= China Folk House Retreat =

- Interactive map of the China Folk House Retreat area

General information
- Architectural style: Han; Bai; Naxi; Tibetan
- Location: 305 Friends Way, Harpers Ferry, West Virginia, United States
- Coordinates: 39°09′27″N 77°50′37″W

The China Folk House Retreat is a Chinese folk house outside Harpers Ferry, West Virginia, United States. Erected in 1989 in China's Yunnan province, the house was dismantled in 2017, shipped to the United States, and reassembled in West Virginia in 2019. It is maintained by a non-profit organization that aims to improve U.S. understanding of Chinese culture.

== History ==
In 2012, John Flower, director of the Chinese studies program at Sidwell Friends School, and his wife Pamela Leonard started bringing students to the southwestern province of Yunnan province as part of a China fieldwork program. Each spring, they brought dozens of 11th- and 12th-grade students to experience Yunnan's cultural and natural environment.

In 2014, Flower, Leonard, and their students visited a small village named Cizhong (Chinese: 茨 中) in the province's Jianchuan County. Located in eastern Himalaya, alongside the Mekong River, the village has a long history of Sino-foreign cultural exchanges. Its Catholic church was established in 1867 by the Paris Foreign Missions Society.

In the village, they met Zhang Jianhua, who invited them to his house, a 1989 dwelling built with traditional methods in a blend of traditional styles: Han, Bai, Naxi and Tibetan. Zhang told them that the house would be flooded by a new hydroelectric power station and that the Chinese government had built a new house for him one kilometer away.

After Flower and his students visited Zhang several times, Flower came up with the idea of buying the house, dismantling it, and rebuilding it in the United States.

In 2017, after weeks of measurements and photographing, the whole house was dismantled, a process made easier by its mortise and tenon structure. The disassembled house was sent to Tianjin, shipped to Baltimore, and finally moved to West Virginia's Friends Wilderness Center in Harpers Ferry.

Following the traditional Chinese method of building, Flower and Leonard and various helpers reassembled the house by 2019. Flower and Leonard formed the China Folk House Retreat, a non-profit to develop the project. Leonard is CEO.

The Chinese Ambassador Qin Gang visited it in June 2022.

On November 2, 2022, Kunming University of Science and Technology, the Linden Centre and Sidwell Friends School held an online seminar on traditional Yunnan architecture, where the Chinese residential projects were discussed. Kunming University of Science and Technology vowed to donate a batch of tiles to the project for the reconstruction.
