= Linden Centre =

Hotel and center in Yunnan, Southwest China

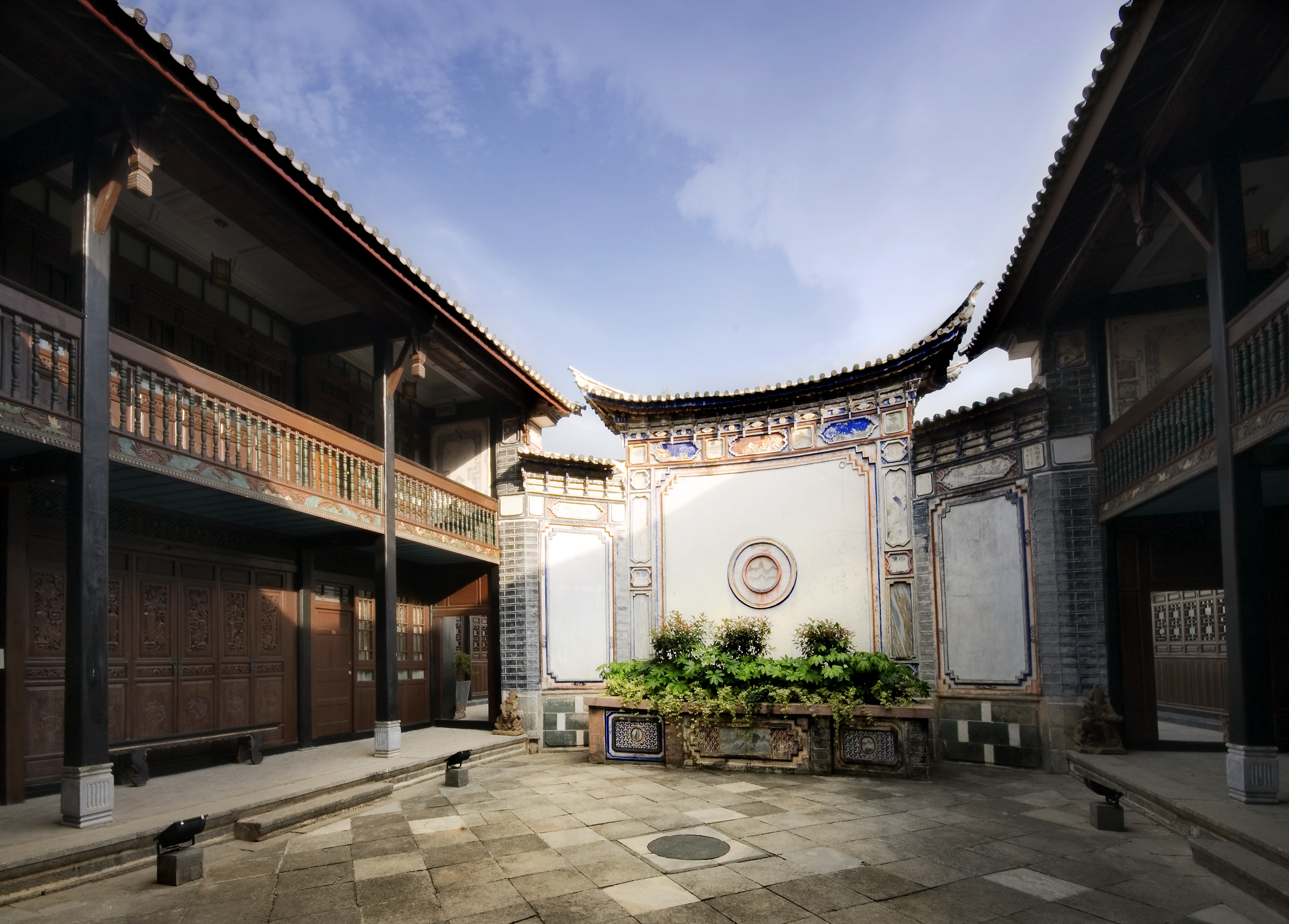
- Company type: Boutique Hotel
- Industry: Hospitality; International Education; Heritage Protection; Cultural Exchange
- Founded: 2007; 19 years ago
- Founders: Brian Linden; Jeanee Linden
- Headquarters: Xizhou, Dali
- Number of locations: 3
- Number of employees: 50
- Website: www.linden-centre.com

The Linden Centre (喜林苑) is a boutique hotel and center for cultural exchange located in Xizhou, Yunnan, in Southwest China. The original location is in a renovated Bai style courtyard home, one of Xizhou's heritage sites protected at the national level. The site itself was first constructed in 1948 and has changed hands several times until Brian and Jeanee Linden began renovations in 2007. The hotel has one courtyard with facilities for public use, including a library with a large collection of Chinese and English books, and two private courtyards housing 14 guest rooms.

== History ==
A businessman from Xizhou named Yang Pinxiang (杨品相) became very wealthy in the early 1900s from trading silk, tea, and dyes on the Tea Horse Road and built a luxurious home in eastern Xizhou. Mr. Yang was educated in Shanghai and incorporated styles from eastern China into his traditionally inspired Bai courtyard home, along with custom facades inspired by Xizhou artists who studied overseas.

After the Communist Revolution in 1949, Mr. Yang's home was turned over for military use as a barracks for several years and housed over 100 soldiers. Decades later, during the Cultural Revolution (1966 - 1976), the building was repurposed as a military hospital. Although many historical structures and homes of opulence in China suffered devastating damage or were wrecked during this era, Mr. Yang's house was spared due to its continued use by the Chinese military. The site changed hands again in the 1990s and became a kindergarten for over a decade.

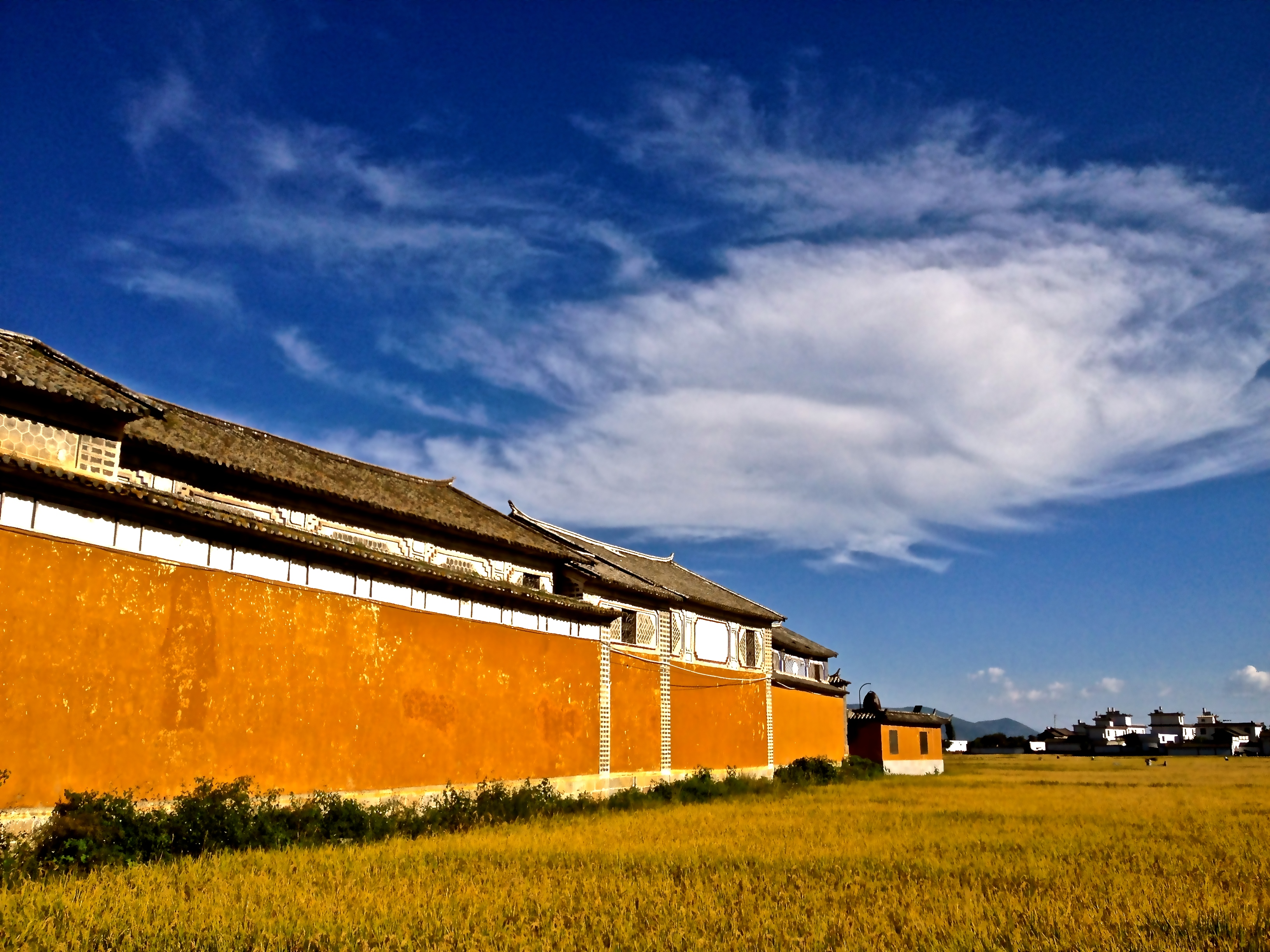
The Linden Centre as seen from outside.

Mr. Yang's home was protected at the provincial level in Yunnan in 1987 and gained national protected status in 2001.

The property is currently managed and operated by Brian and Jeanee Linden, two Americans who are the only foreigners to own a nationally protected heritage site in China. They have been operating the site as The Linden Centre since renovations began in 2007.

== Renovations ==
The property has been continuously occupied and has changed hands several times since 1948, with very little structural upkeep until renovations began in 2007. Along with necessary safety installations (pipes replaced, fire extinguishers installed), the Linden Centre added glass ceilings to protect the original artwork from wind, rain, and sun damage, re-levelled floors and walkways, and restored the original living spaces.

== Description ==
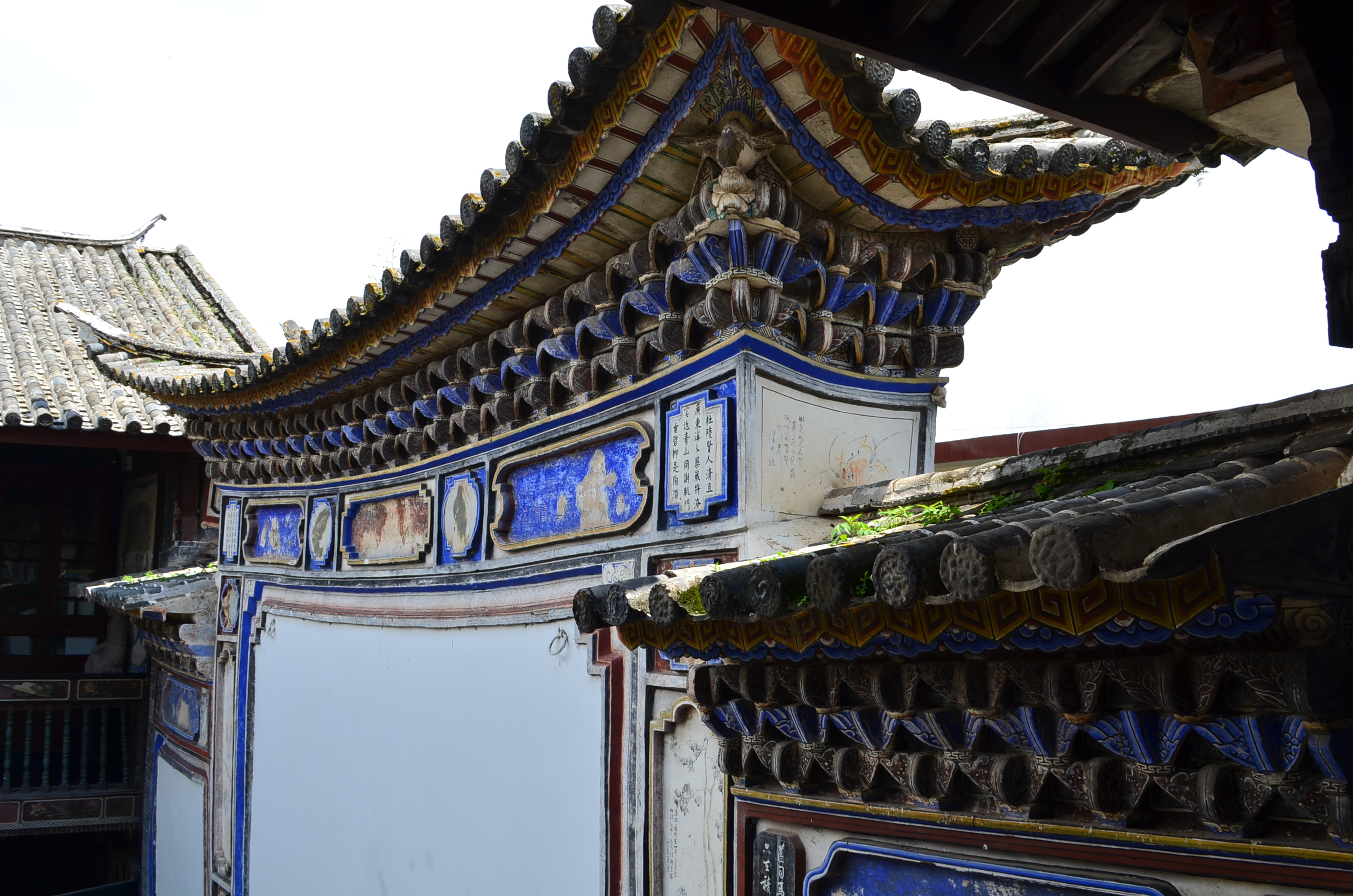
The upper facade of a Bai reflecting wall in the Linden Centre.

Although the site has been renovated and refurnished, all of the wall art, reflecting walls, structure, and facades are original. The style is typical for its era of construction, this time is characterized as an economic boom in Xizhou and many large courtyard homes were built in a similar size and with the same attention to detail.

The Linden Centre's main courtyard and facilities are open to the public, while the second, third, and exterior courtyards are for the hotel's guests.

== Locations ==
In 2013 and 2015, the Linden Centre expanded to renovate and restore two other nationally protected heritage sites in Xizhou. Yang Zhuoran (杨卓然) and Bao Chengfu (宝成府) are two other properties built in the same era and in a similar style. Yang Zhuoran is composed of dorms, classrooms, and a library, serving as a facility for educational programs, while Bao Chengfu has 14 guest rooms, highlighting its public space and facilities for community involvement.

== Gallery ==
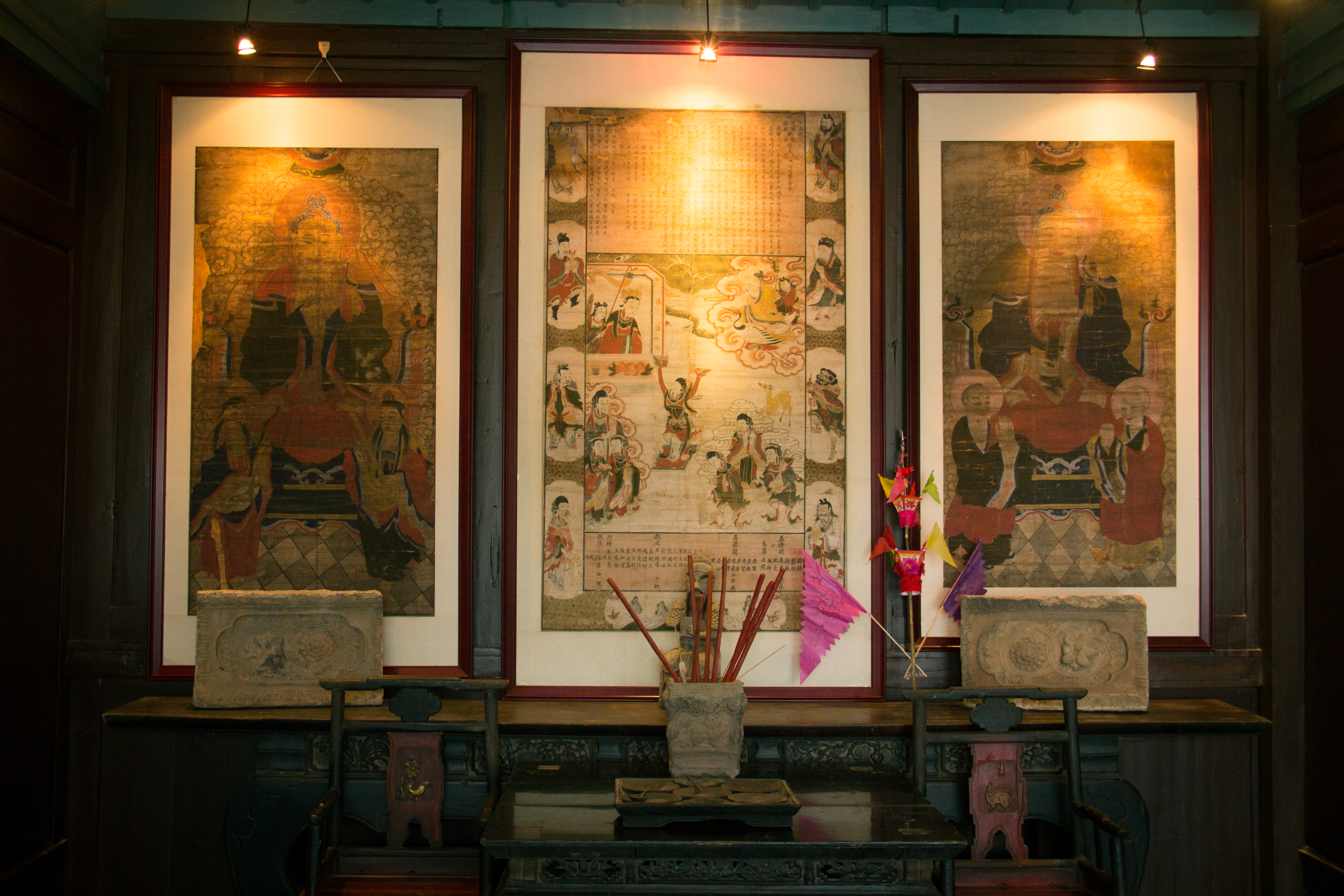
Bai ancestor room at the Linden Centre.

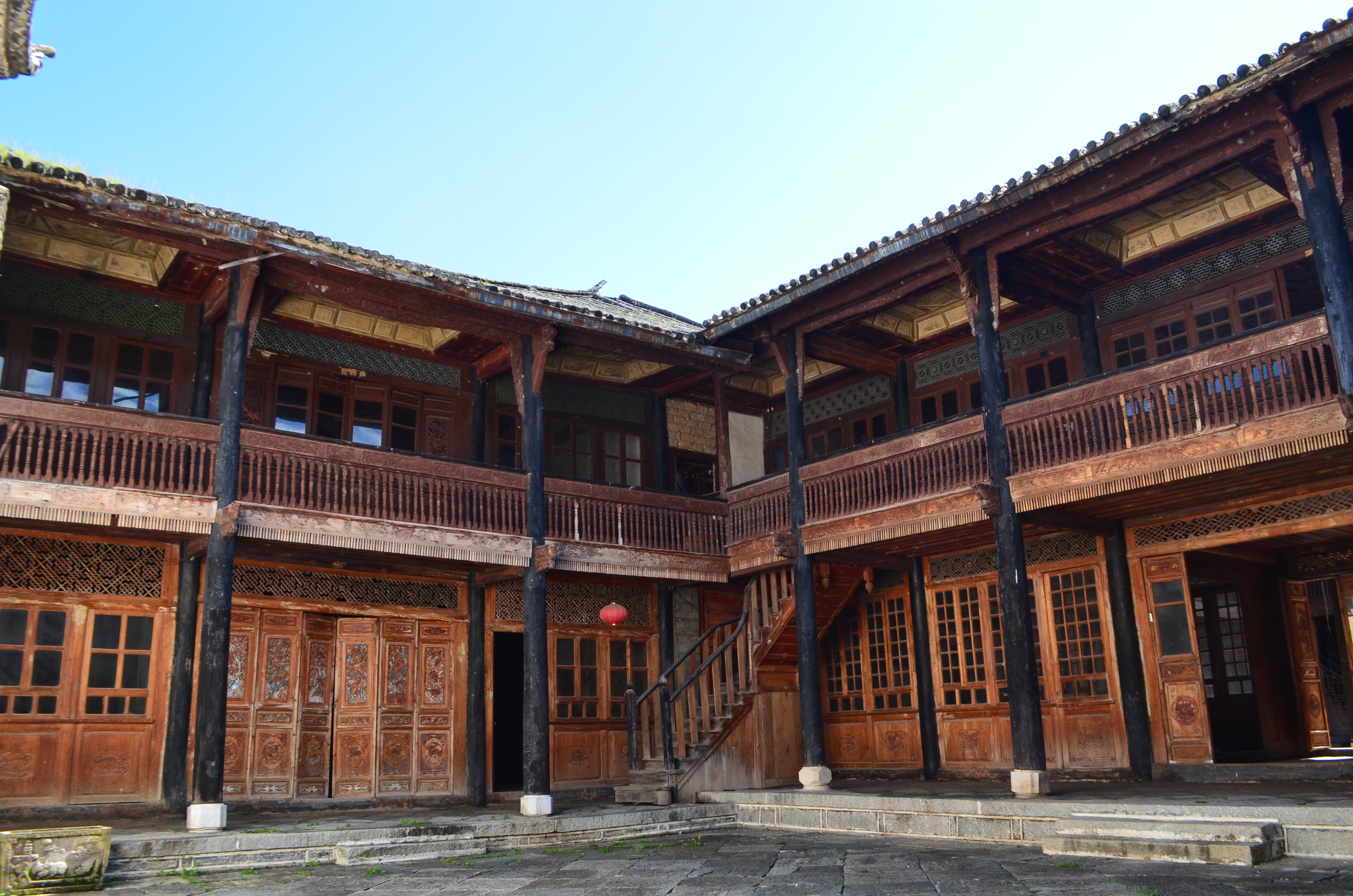
The first courtyard of Bao Chengfu under construction.

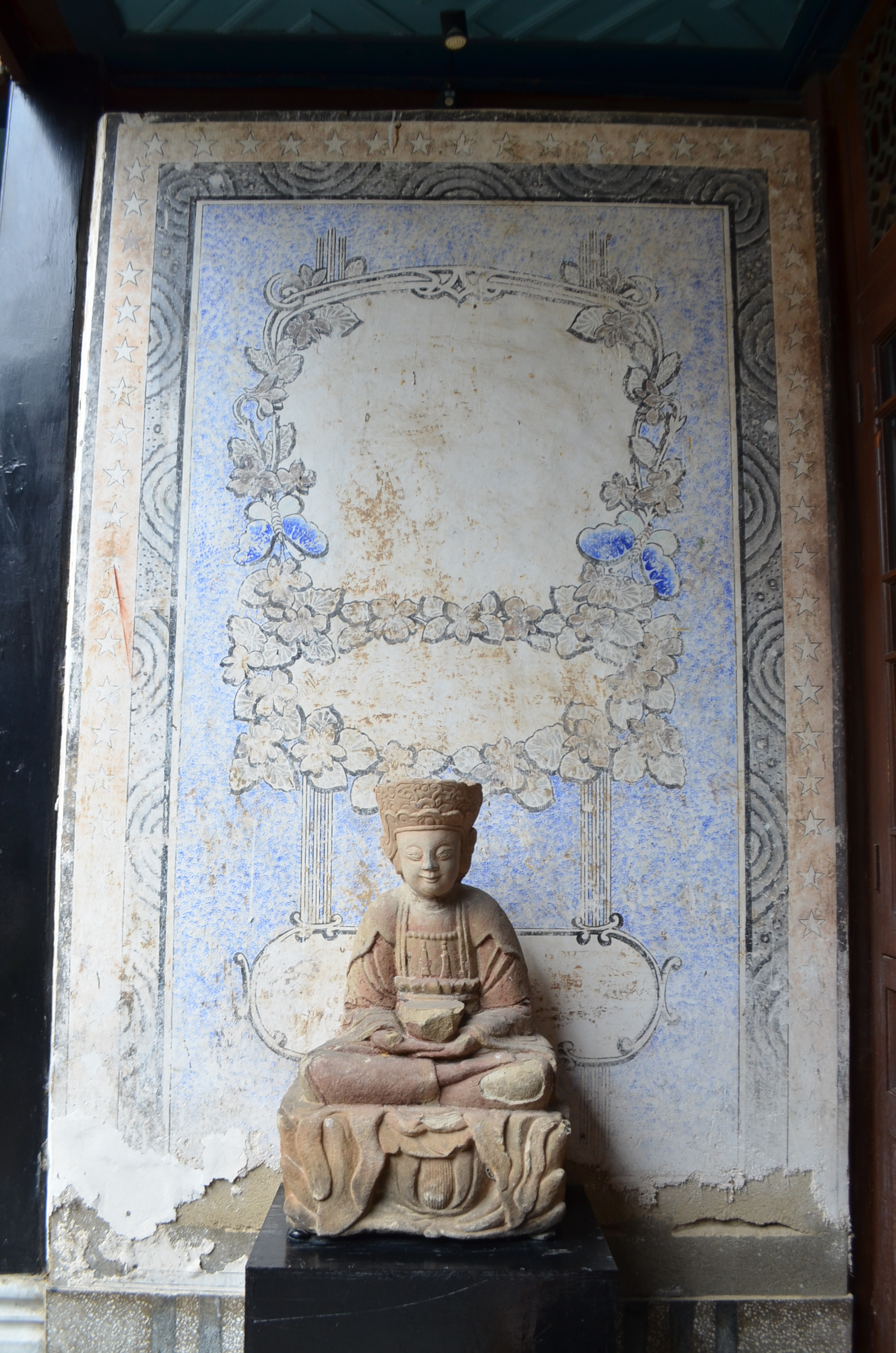
A statue sits in front of original artwork.

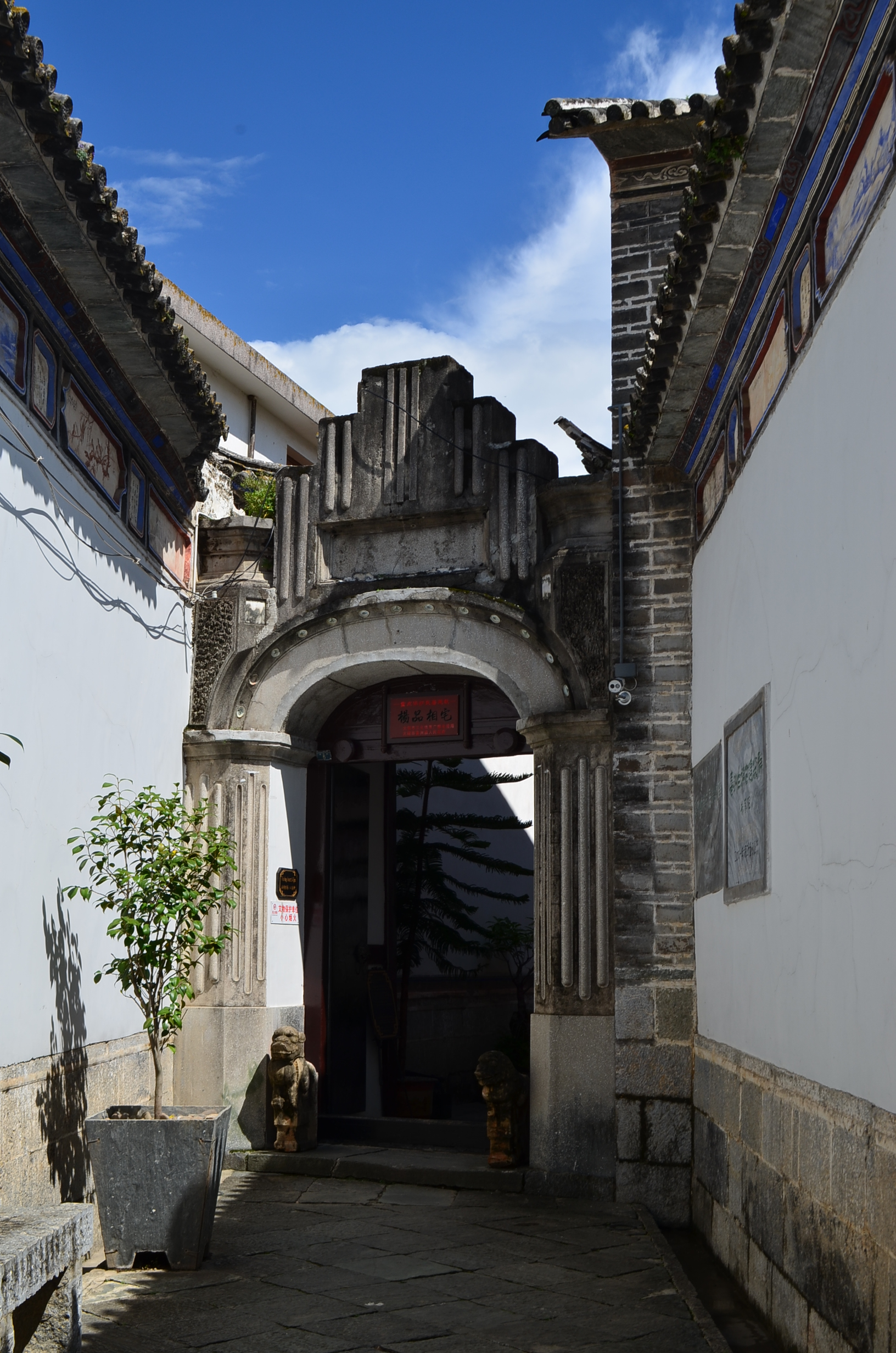
A Shanghai style Shikumen as the Linden Centre's entryway.

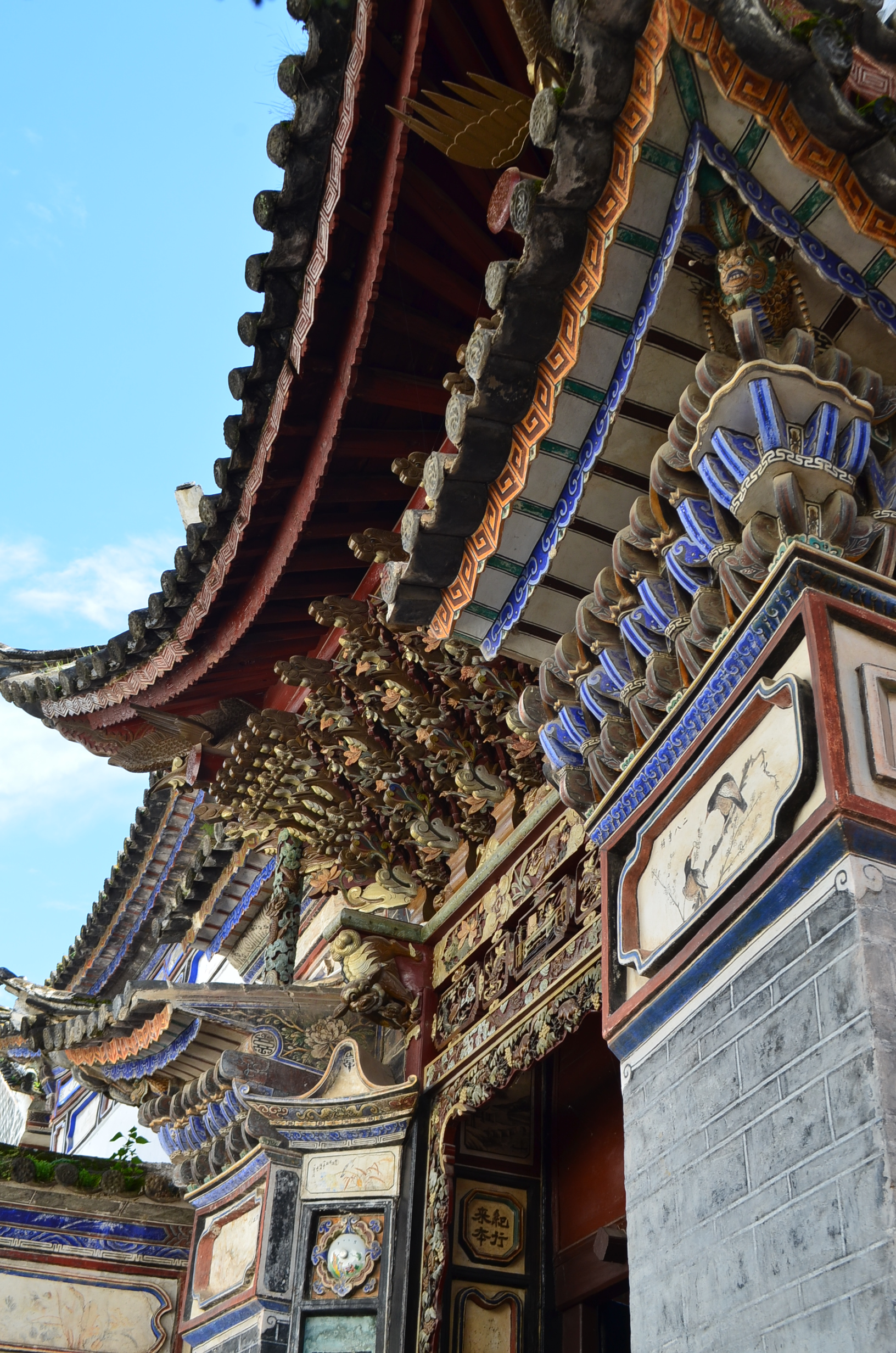
The second entryway is a more traditional Bai style.

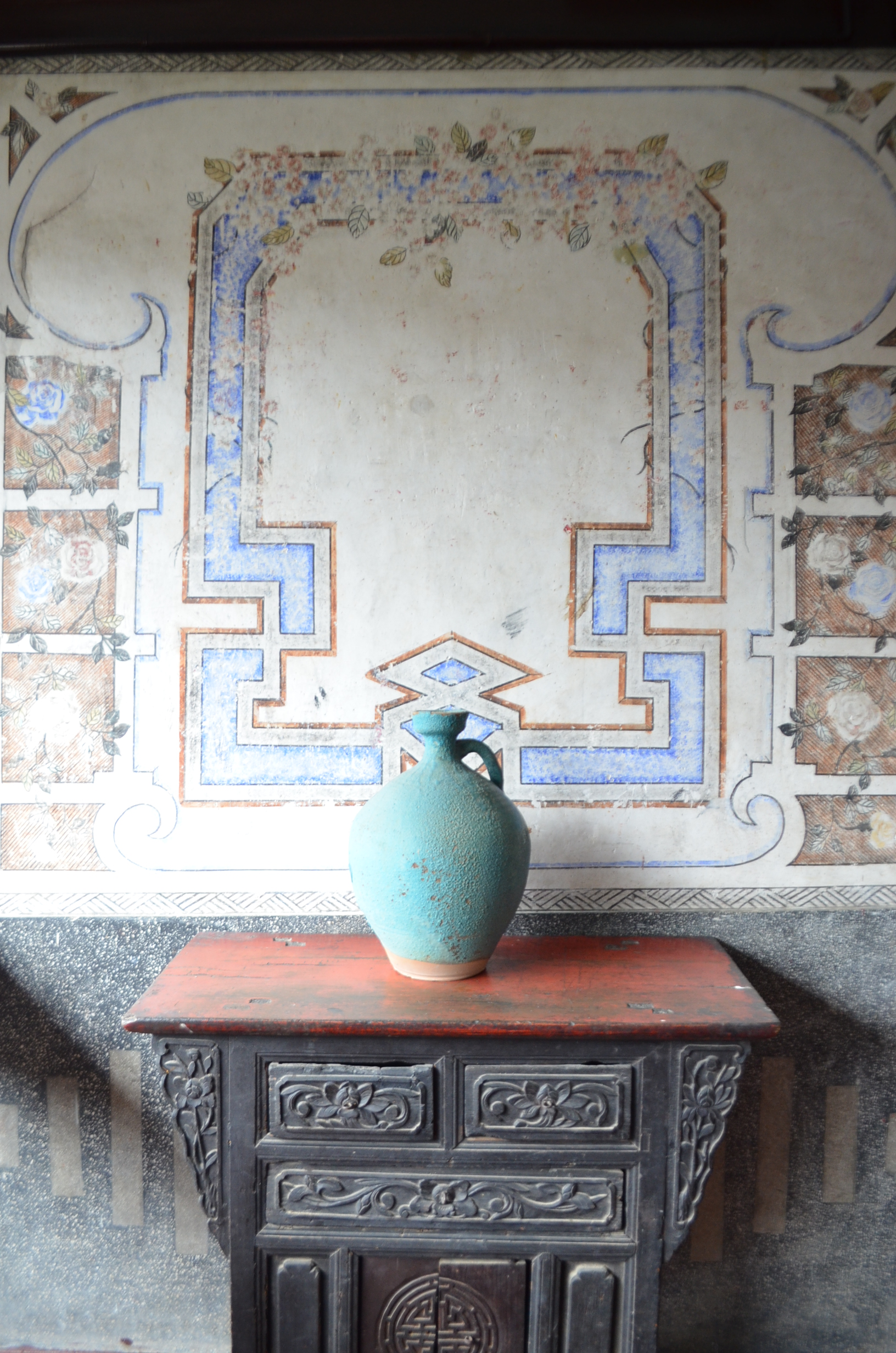
A pot sits in front of original artwork.
