= Xizhou, Dali =

Town in Yunnan, China

Xizhou 喜洲镇
- Town
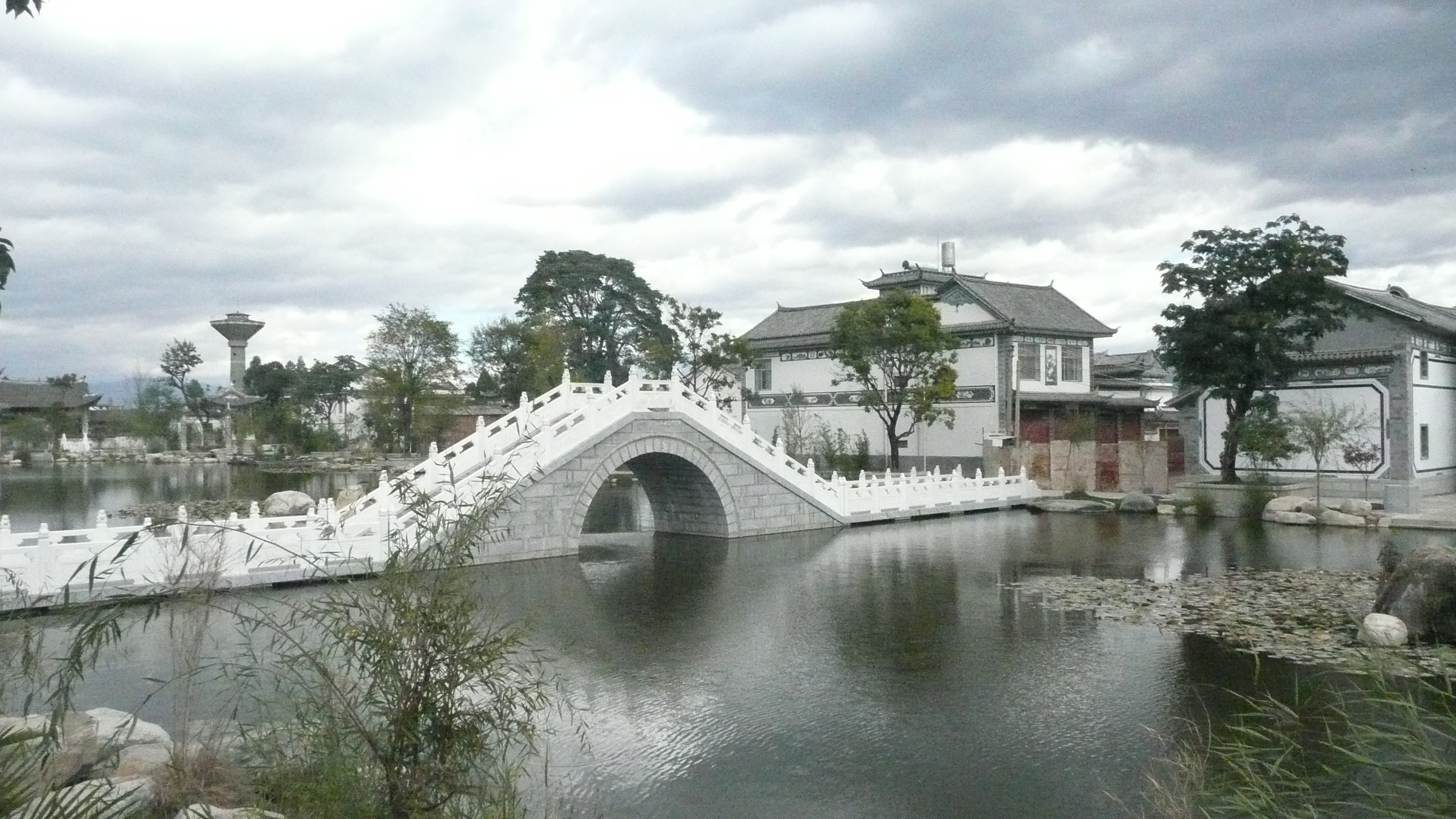
- Moon Bridge (月亮桥)

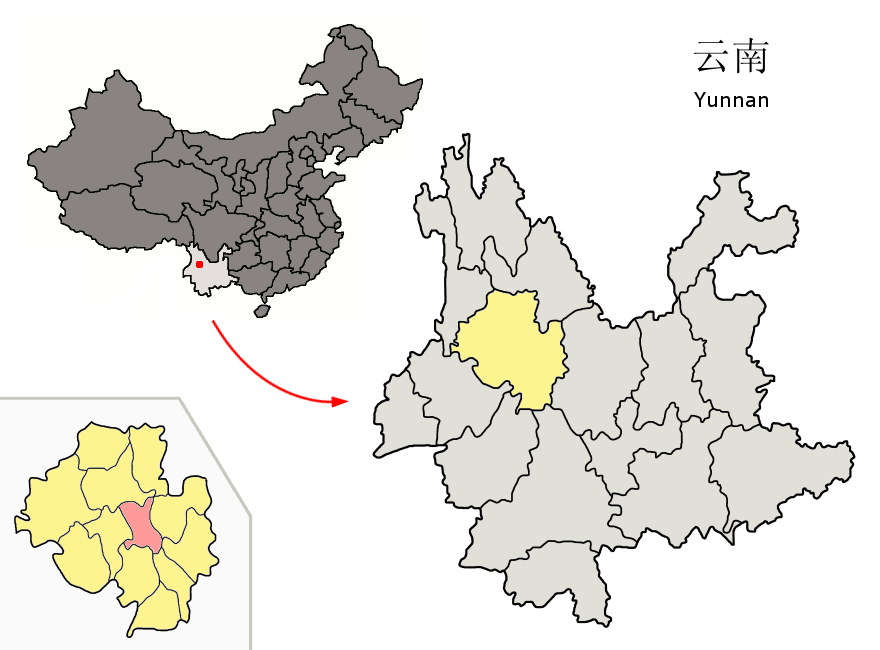
- Xizhou resides in Dali City (pink) and Dali Prefecture (yellow) within Yunnan

- Location in Yunnan
- Coordinates: 25°51′11″N 100°7′46″E
- Country: People's Republic of China
- Province: Yunnan
- Prefecture: Dali Bai Autonomous Prefecture
- County: Dali City

Area
  - Total: 161.00 km^{2} (62.16 sq mi)
- Elevation: 2,007 m (6,585 ft)

Population (2020)
  - Total: 54,779
  - Density: 340.24/km^{2} (881.22/sq mi)
- Time zone: UTC+8 (China Standard)
- Postal code: 671004
- Area code: 0872
- Climate: Cwb

Xizhou
- Chinese: 喜洲
Transcriptions
Standard Mandarin
- Hanyu Pinyin: Xǐzhōu

Xizhou (Chinese: 喜洲) is a town located 20 km (12 mi) north of Dali Old Town in Dali City, part of the Dali Bai Autonomous Prefecture in northwestern Yunnan, China. The town consists of 13 small villages with a combined population estimated at 54,779, mostly consisting of Bai people with a small population of Hui and Han residents.

Xizhou is located about 1 km (0.62 mi) from the shores of Erhai Lake to the east, and 2 km (1.2 mi) to the Cang Mountain to the west. Xizhou has been historically important as a trading post along the Tea Horse Road, it was once home to a landing strip and radio station for the Flying Tigers during WWII, has been home to notable rulers and governors of local polities past and present, and has gained notoriety in modernity for its high concentration of preserved and restored traditional Bai architecture and protected heritage sites.

== History ==
Although Xizhou's ancient origins are unclear, the fertile valley that Xizhou lies in has been continuously inhabited for thousands of years. The history of Xizhou dates back to the Sui Dynasty (581 - 618 AD) when it was first incorporated by General Shi Wansui. Soon after, the simultaneous creation of the Nanzhao Kingdom (737 - 902 AD) and the formation of the Tea Horse Road (8th - 20th Century) in the 700s AD had a huge influence on the town's future. Xizhou was located only a few kilometers from the political and military capital of the Nanzhao Kingdom, and benefited from the kingdom's expertise in architecture and engineering. During this era, it served as a military fortress and a temporary palace for the King on Nanzhao.

The Yuan dynasty (1271 - 1368 AD) imported a sizeable Muslim population from Northern China and Central Asia to fill high political positions throughout modern Yunnan, and many of the region's Muslim inhabitants can trace their ancestry back to these series of migrations. The Mongol Empire also brought the region their practice of making cheese from cow's milk and whey, a tradition originating in the grassland steppes of Mongolia but one that many families in Xizhou continues today.

During the Ming dynasty (1368 - 1644) Xizhou prospered in business and trade on the Tea Horse Road. Bai merchants traveled extensively from Southeast Asia to Tibet, trading their region's tea, marble, and handicrafts. This era brought Xizhou a scholarly reputation, beginning a tradition of writing the names of students who passed the national exam on a large gate in the town square, a tradition that continues today for Xizhou residents who have achieved success in academia, business, and politics.

After the Qing dynasty (1644 - 1912) business thrived and it became common for children of wealthy families to go abroad for their studies. Xizhou again became a center of academia, gathering professors and intellectuals after Huazhong University relocated here from Wuhan, earning the nickname "Cambridge of the East." Yale-in-China also relocated to Xizhou during World War II to escape the Japanese occupation of eastern China.

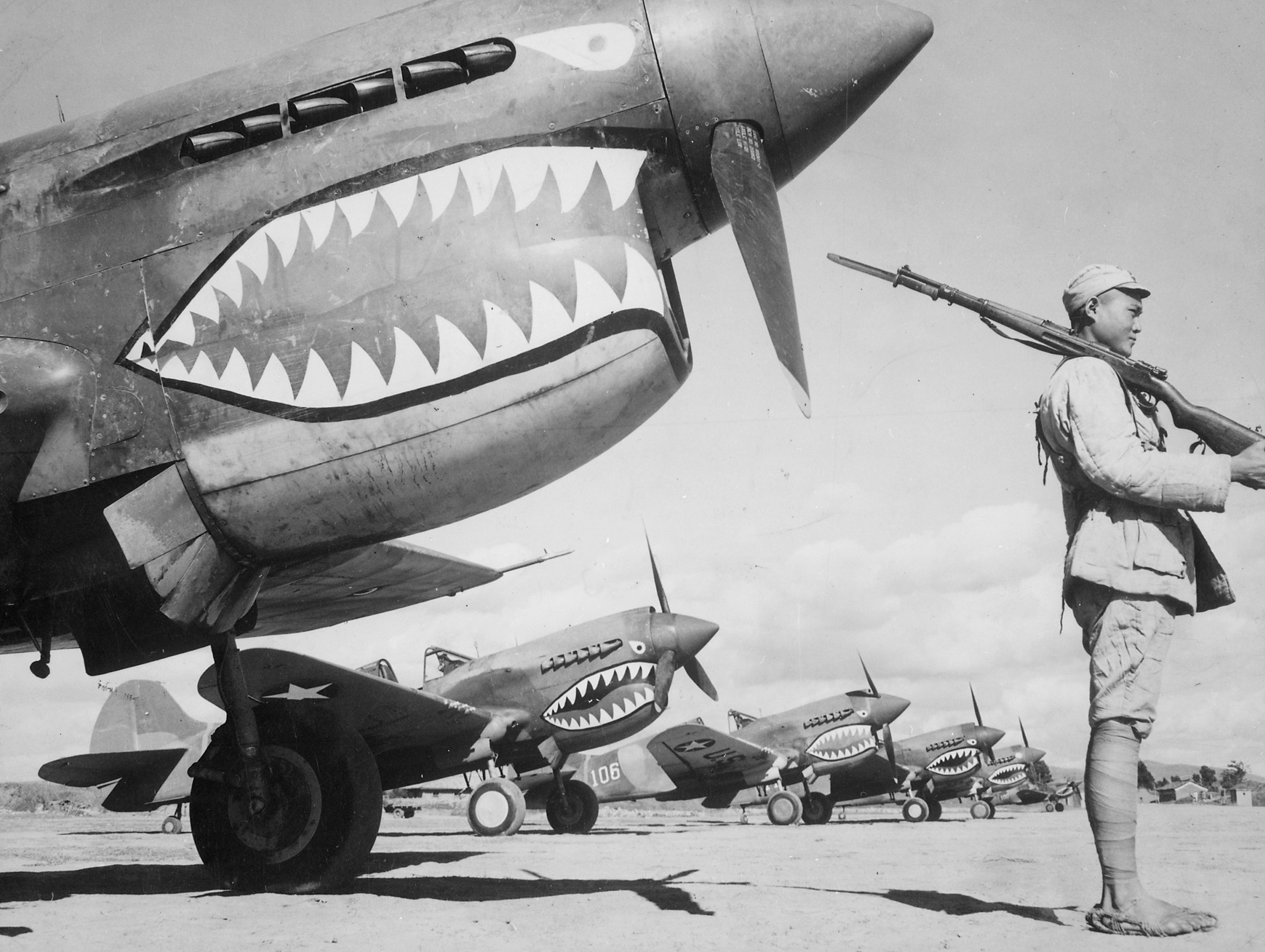
The Flying Tigers had a radio station and air strip in Xizhou during WWII.

During World War II, the American and Chinese armies cooperated in Yunnan as the Flying Tigers, uniting in their fight against Japan. The Americans had superior technology and the Chinese had strategic bases, so the two armies cooperated and shared supplies and materials, working together for several years from bases throughout Southwest China. Xizhou had a small base, airstrip, and radio station which was the first point of contact when planes carrying supplies from Burma first arrived over the Himalayan mountains.

== Geography ==
Xizhou is located 20 km (12 mi) north of Dali's old town and about 35 km (22 mi) from Dali's new centre, Xiaguan. It is located on a fertile plateau between the Cangshan mountain range to the west and Erhai lake to the east at an elevation of 2,000 m.

== Places of interest ==
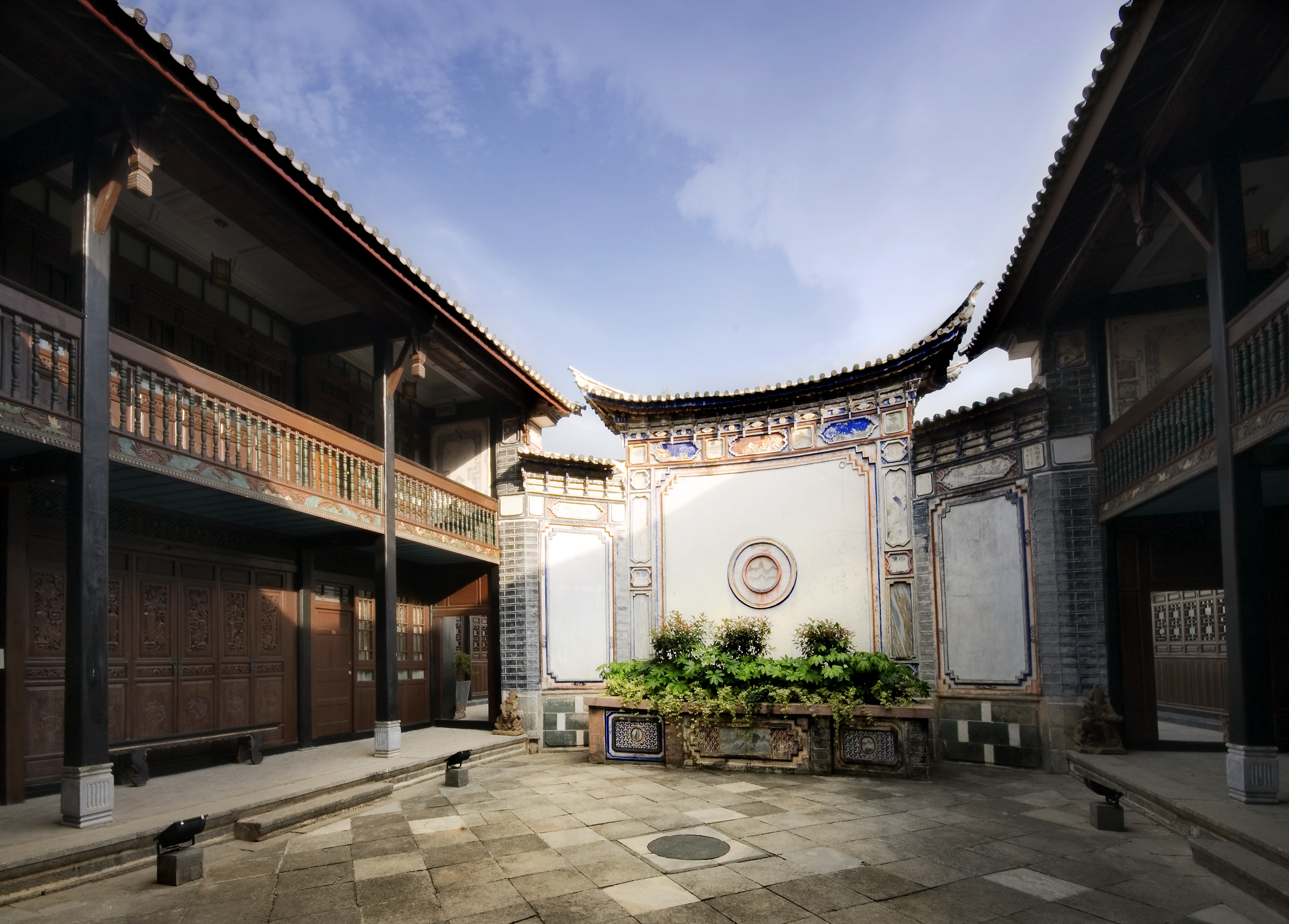
A Bai reflecting wall in the Linden Centre.

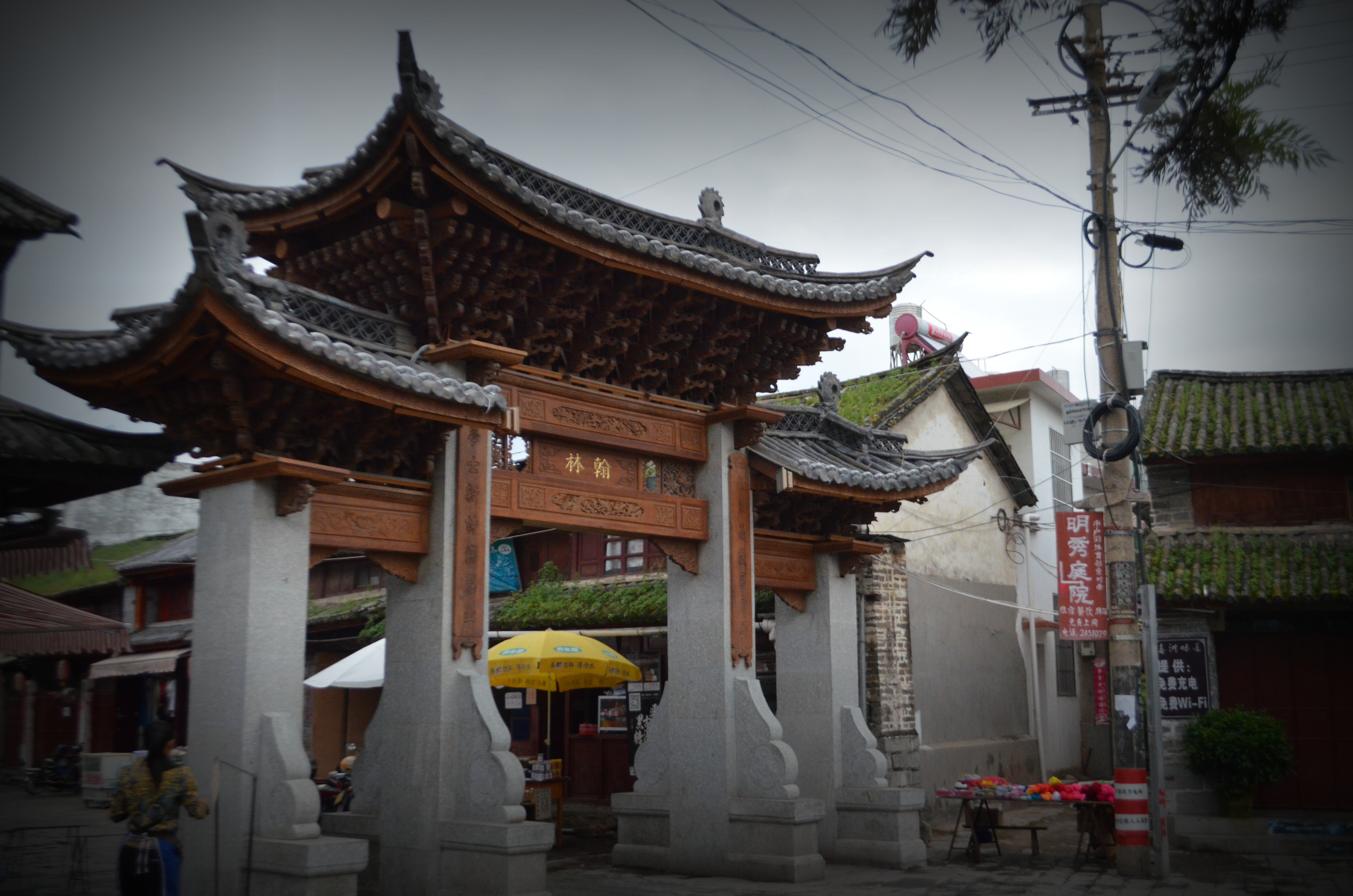
A large gate (Hanlin Fang) in Xizhou's town square.

- Xizhou's daily morning market is one of the largest in the Dali valley and draws farmers and vendors from nearby villages.
- Daci Temple (大慈寺) is an ancient structure that was occupied by Japanese troops during World War II and used by Hunan University for 8 years after the war. The temple has statues and icons from different religious beliefs including Buddhism, Taoism, Confucianism, and the Bai people's Benzhu (本主) folk religion. It became a protected heritage site in 1986.
- The Linden Centre is housed in a traditional courtyard mansion restored by two Americans.
- The town square (四方街) is an open space for public gathering with restaurants, food stalls, Xizhou baba (a dough pie served savory or sweet, a local delicacy), and a large marble gate adorned with the names of notable past and present Xizhou residents.
- Yan Family Compound (严家大院), a well preserved and partially renovated structure in the town square. The compound has been converted in a museum of Xizhou's history and Bai architecture. This site was the original residence of Yan Zizhen, a wealthy businessman from the early 20th century, and is a pristine example of high Bai architecture.
- Huadianba (花甸坝) is a high elevation plateau about 4–5 hours from Xizhou on foot. This grassy plain is home to a small population of herders and their yaks, horses, and sheep.
- Zhoucheng (周城) is a town located 10 km (6.2 mi) north of Xizhou, and has developed a reputation for its finely crafted traditional style tie dye (扎染).

== Culture ==
=== Raosanling ===
Raosanling (绕三灵) is the most important religious festival in the calendar of the Bai people. It takes place in three villages in the Dali valley during the fourth lunar month and lasts for three days, each major activity taking place at a different location. The second day's activity takes place in Xizhou.

- On Day 1, worship takes place at Qingdong temple at the foot of Wutai peak, some 15 km (9.3 mi) north of the old city of Dali. This is always the busiest day: not only is the temple jam-packed with worshippers who bring food offerings, but outside a large market takes place almost all the way from the main road to the temple.
- On Day 2, the action moves to a smaller temple near the waterfront in a small village east of Xizhou. Focus of the day is on singing and entertainment, with many groups performing Bai opera - particularly later in the afternoon in the school-yard not far from the temple.
- Day 3 sees the temple of Majiuyi, only six kilometres from Dali, become the centre of attention. The Dongjing music association plays in the temple before worship moves to a small shrine on the lake-front later in the afternoon.

=== Tea ceremony ===
The Bai people traditionally serve a special Three Course Tea ceremony during weddings and as a welcome to their guests. The three courses include bitter, sweet, and strange, which represent the different phases of a human life.

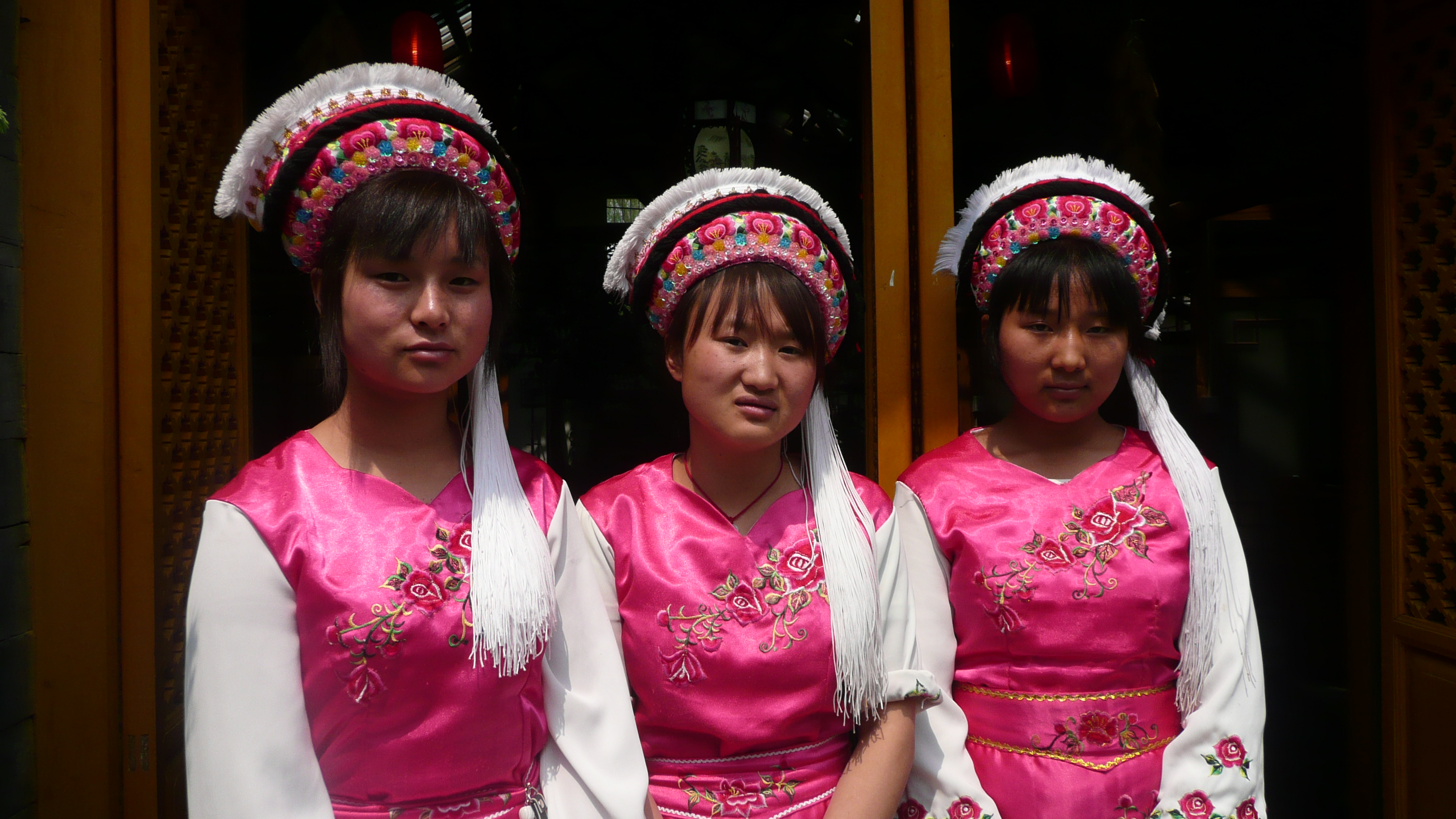
Three Bai women wearing their traditional headdresses.

=== Headdress ===
Although men have abandoned traditional Bai attire in recent decades, many women still wear a distinctive headdress whose shape, materials, and colors correspond to a short poem about the natural beauty of the Dali valley. Wind, flowers, snow, and moonlight (风花雪月) are each symbolically depicted on Bai women's headdresses.

=== Matriarchy ===
The Bai traditionally practiced a matriarchal organization of society, which is still evident in their architecture and selected social gender roles. Under the eaves of many grand entranceways to homes and buildings, a golden phoenix (female) dominates a series of smaller dragons (male) from above, representing the higher social position of women in society. Similar to Yunnan's Naxi and Tibetan matriarchal culture, Bai men traditionally were in charge of the home and raising children while women were the primary breadwinners for their families. Much has changed to Bai culture over the past century, and these traditional gender roles are far less discrete today.

=== Architecture ===
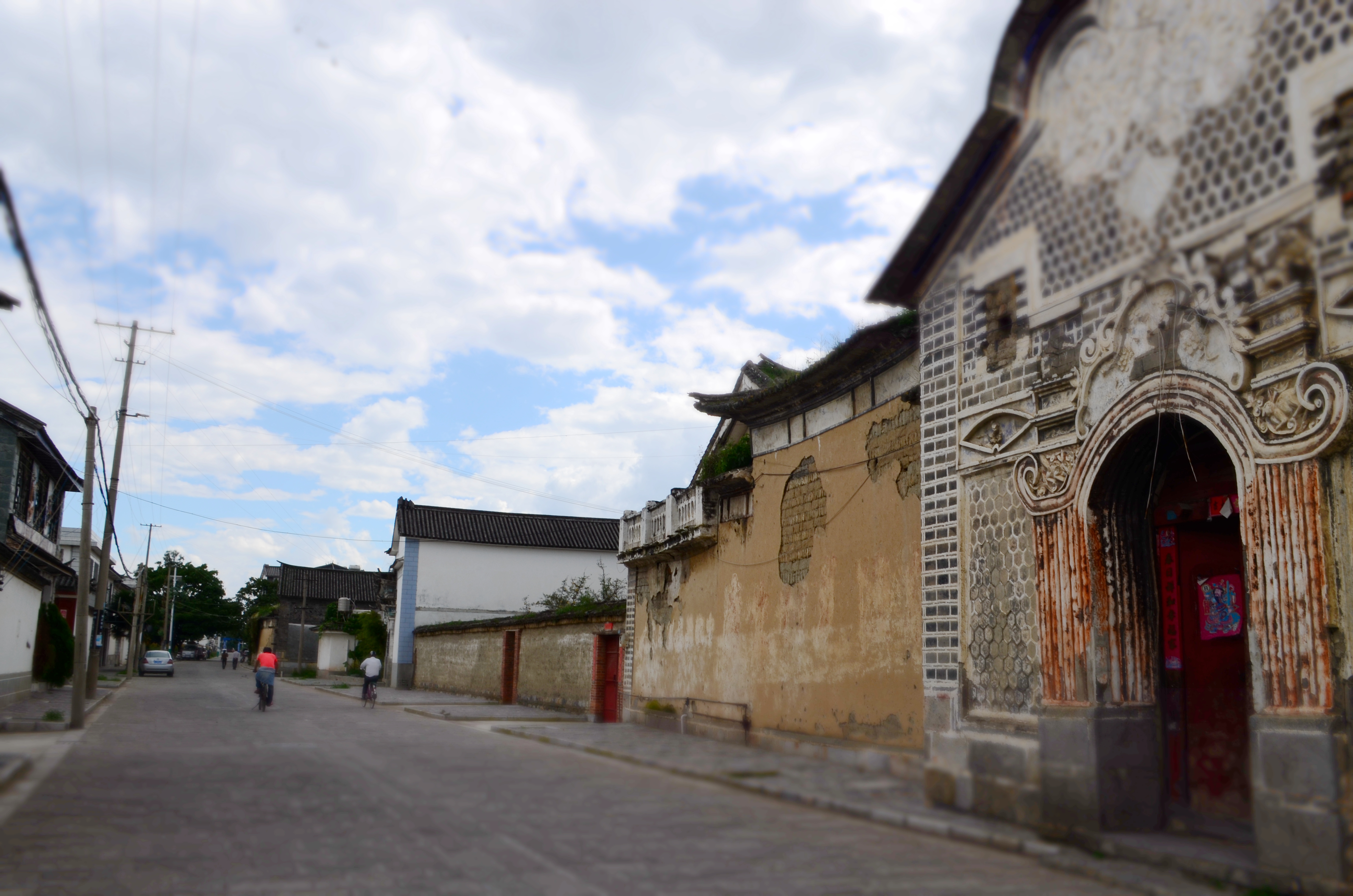
Many buildings in Xizhou are protected heritage sites and some are centuries old.

The best documented aspect of Bai culture in Xizhou is the traditional architecture. The history of world class engineering, architecture, and education Xizhou has enjoyed was combined with a period of great financial success in business during the 19th century, and resulted in hundreds of tastefully constructed Bai courtyard style homes that merge traditional local structures with styles imported from across Lijiang, eastern China, and abroad. Many of the buildings were occupied by the Chinese military or served a purpose to local and provincial level governments and spared during the Cultural Revolution, a period of time that many old buildings in China didn't survive. Due to the shared values of Xizhou citizens, many of these structures have become protected heritage sites, some protected at the national level like the Great Wall.

An iconic and important attribute of Bai architecture is the inclusion of a large, white reflecting wall in courtyard homes. Wealthier homes will often designate one wall to be a reflecting wall while the other three serve as living spaces (三坊一照壁). The reflecting wall serves a practical and symbolic purpose; the white color creates a lighter space in the courtyard especially in the afternoon, it typically faces west in Xizhou to reflect evil spirits that dwell in the depths of Erhai lake away, and it reflects luck and prosperity into the room directly opposite, which is considered to be the most important room in the courtyard.

The use of marble in Bai architecture is commonplace due to its abundance and easy access. Marble is incorporated into many courtyard homes' floors, stairs, pillars, and is commonly used as artwork or decoration. Unlike many other parts of the world, when marble is used as art or decoration the price is not decided by its quality but by its aesthetic. In Chinese, the word 'marble' is '大理石' which literally means 'Dali stone.' Marble is found in other parts of China, but the production of marble in the Dali valley has been famous for many years.

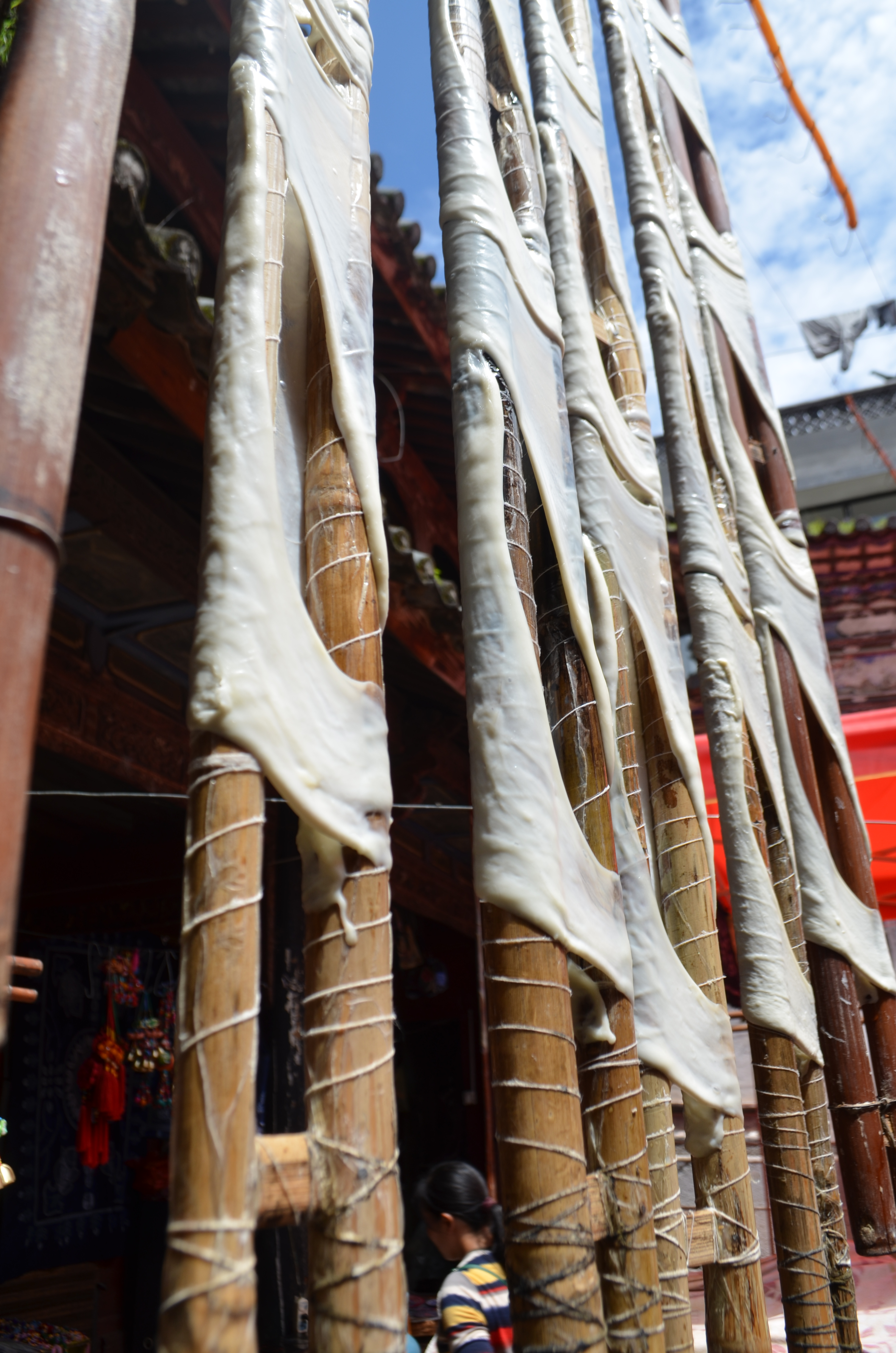
Fresh Rushan cheese (乳扇) is stretched and dried on bamboo.

=== Food ===
Unusual for China, the Bai people produce and eat Rushan cheese (乳扇) made from cow's milk and whey. Usually made in small batches and stretched out like a fan over parallel bamboo poles to dry in the sunlight, this cheese is eaten like a snack or used in cooking. It is also a main ingredient in the second course of the Three Course Tea ceremony. The Bai's cheese can be eaten fresh, dried, or fried and is usually served with a sweet sauce, sugar or rose jam.

Erkuai (饵块) is a locally produced rice product bought as a brick and served as either flat strips or noodles. Traditionally, making erkuai was very labor-intensive and only manufactured in large groups for festivals, but with the introduction of machines the production process became efficient enough to produce large amounts of erkuai for cheap consumption, and it can now be found and purchased at Xizhou's market every day.

=== Handicraft ===
Tie-dye (扎染) is a specialty handicraft product produced in nearby Zhoucheng. The Bai people have been making tie dye fabric for generations with naturally rendered dye.

=== Religion ===
It is common to find a temple in Xizhou that hosts statues depicting gods and spirits from different religions coexisting harmoniously. Even symbols from contradictory systems of belief like Confucianism and Taoism can be seen side by side, along with those from Buddhism and the Bai Benzhu (本主) folk religion. There is a small mosque in Xizhou in the Northwest corner, but even this place of worship has evidence of cultural exchange in its traditionally Bai architecture, much of which bears heavy Benzhu influence.

== Economy ==
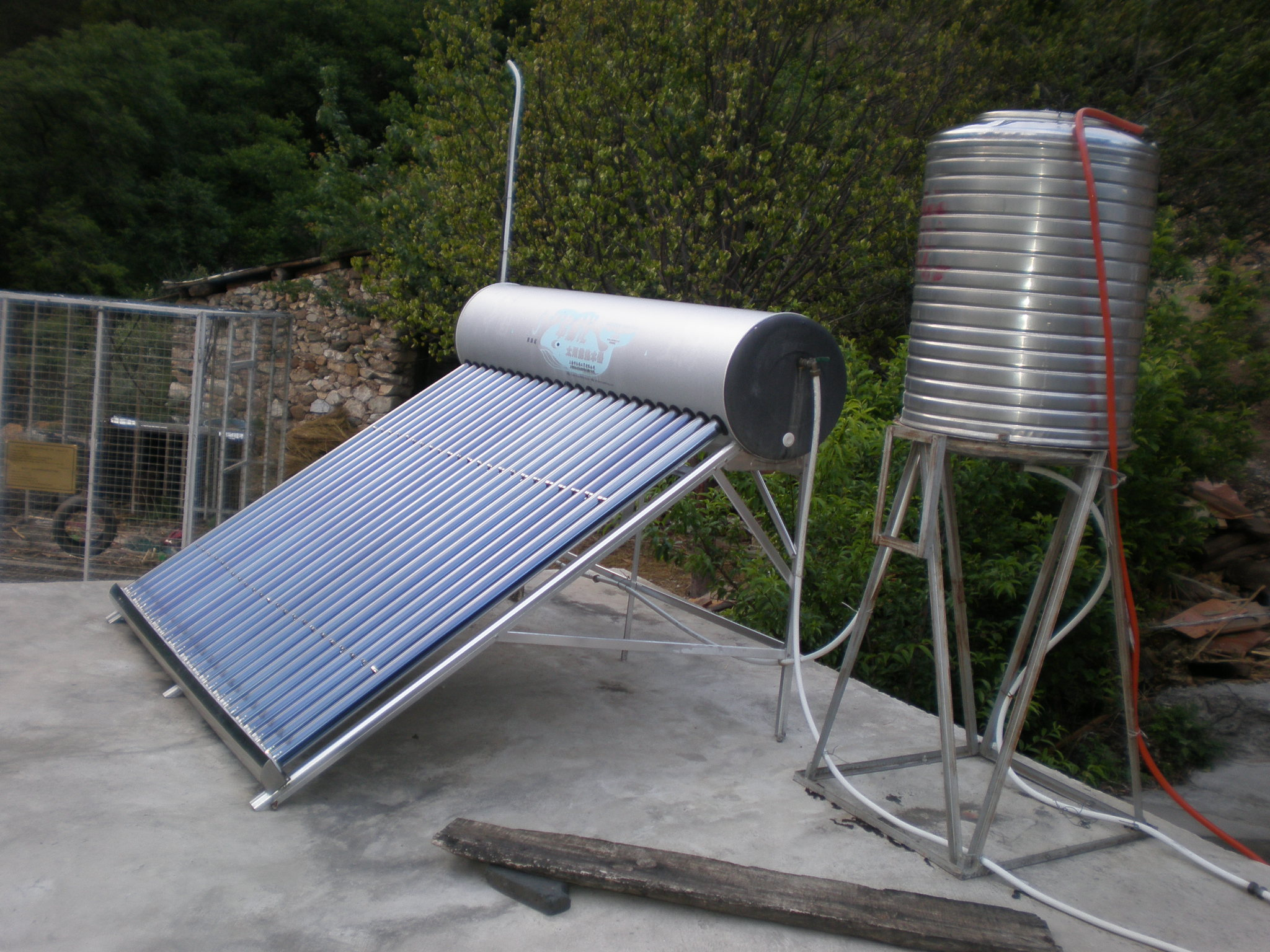
Rooftop solar panels are becoming very common in the Yunnan countryside as a cost-effective way to heat domestic water.

The local economy is mostly agricultural, many of Xizhou's local farms grow rice and corn in the summer rainy season and garlic and broad beans during the dry season the rest of the year. There are two growing seasons and the entire valley grows a wide variety of fruits and vegetables, and many families raise their own chickens, pigs, cows, and sheep for personal use or for the market.

Like many other rural agricultural communities in Yunnan, some Xizhou farmers are starting to realize the potential of organic practices and the incorporation of green technology like solar and wind power to cut costs.

In addition to farming, construction and skilled production of marble and wood make up a majority of the economy. Marble production and refinement has a long history in the valley, due to its abundance and easy access to reserves in the Cangshan mountains.

Its proximity to Dali's old town has also exposed modern Xizhou to a daily dose of tourism. Many locals have taken advantage of this opportunity and cater to the emerging tourism industry by opening up restaurants, coffeeshops, and guesthouses in town.

== Education ==
Xizhou's history has a deep focus on academic success and has hosted temporary campuses for Huazhong University and Yale-in-China during the past century. Today, the town is home to public schools for locals year round, and several times a year the students of Sidwell Friends School from Washington, D.C. and Shanghai American School use Xizhou as a satellite campus to study Chinese history and culture and undertake research projects on a variety of subjects.

== Transportation ==
Xizhou is a short bus ride from Dali's old town, accessible by buses from both the 214 highway and the Dali-Lijiang road (大丽路). Buses from old town should take about 30 minutes and cost around 7 RMB.

Xizhou is small enough to walk through its entirety in a few minutes, but horse carts and bicycles are a popular mode of transportation.

== Gallery ==
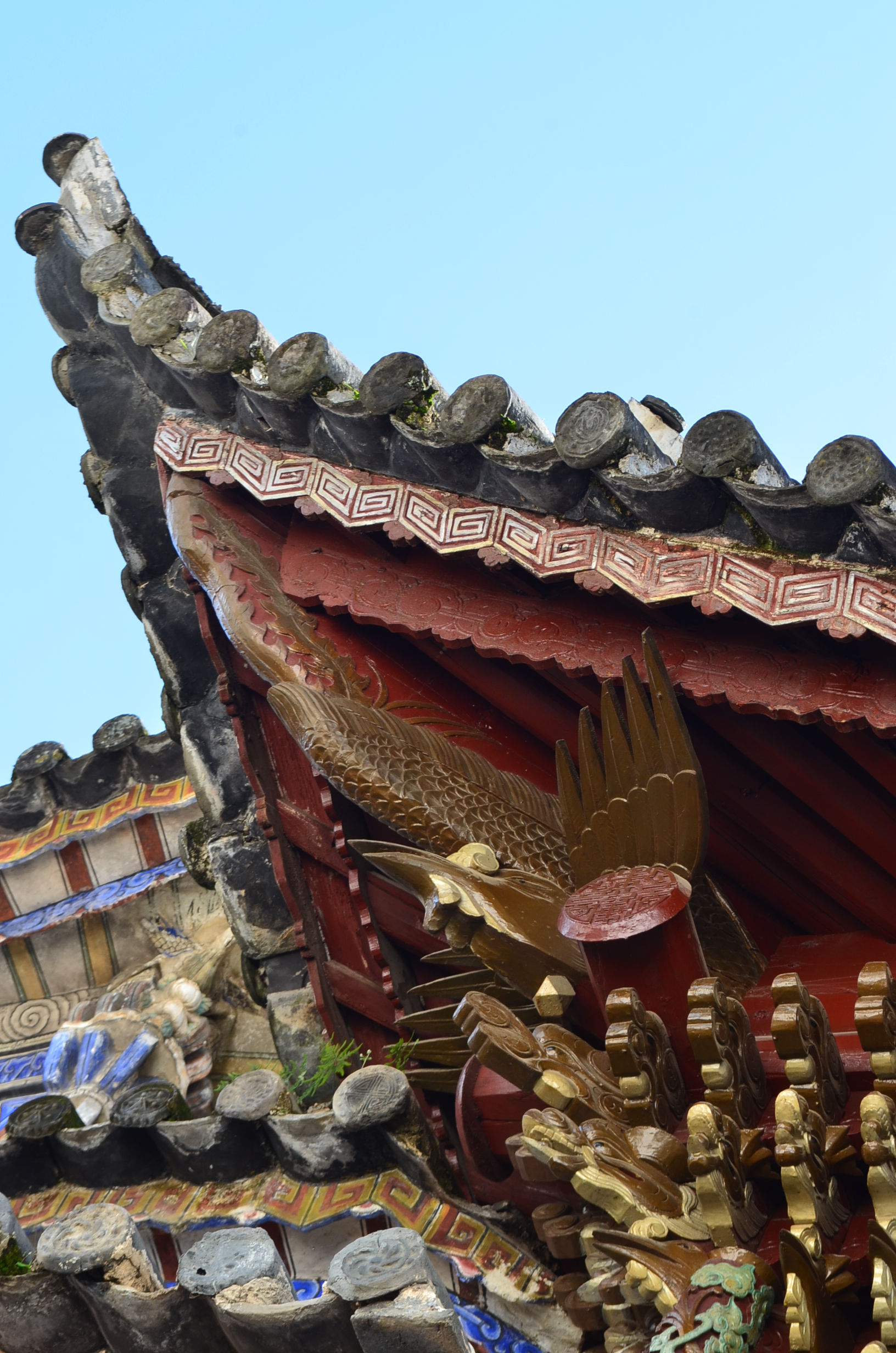
A Bai rooftop with traditional facades in Xizhou.

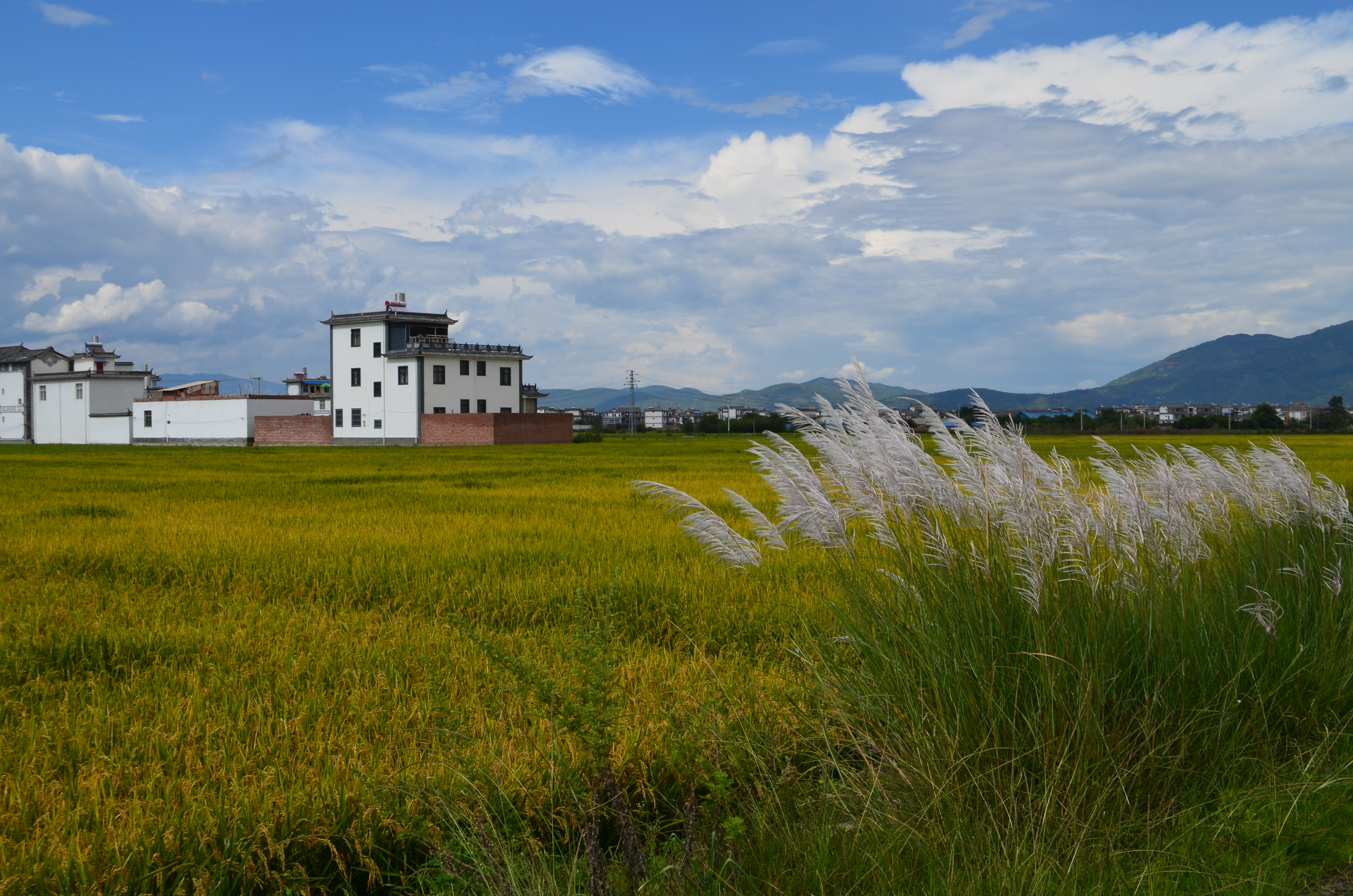
Rice fields and the town of Xizhou.

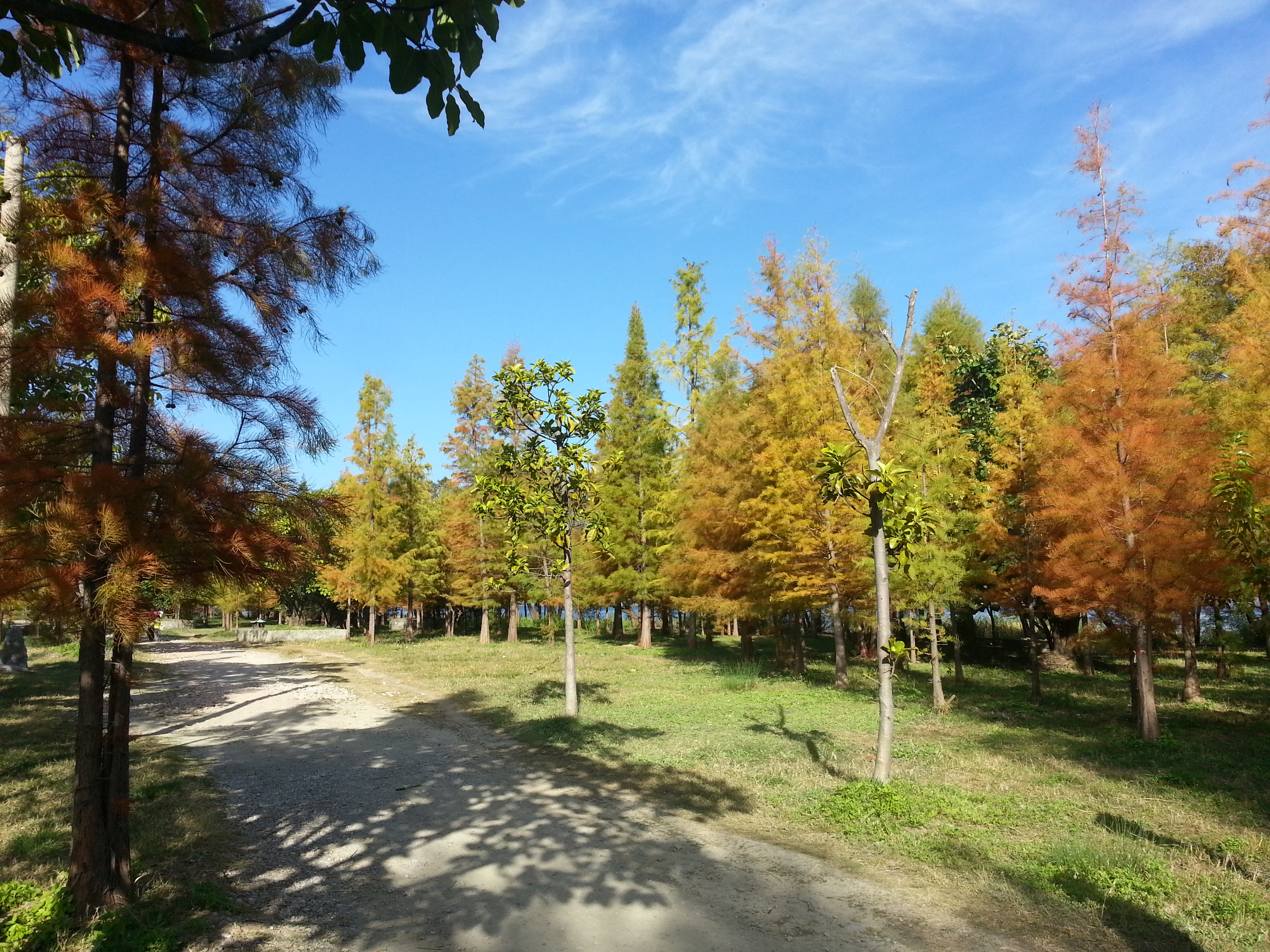
Leaves changing color in Tongue of the Lake Park, Xizhou.

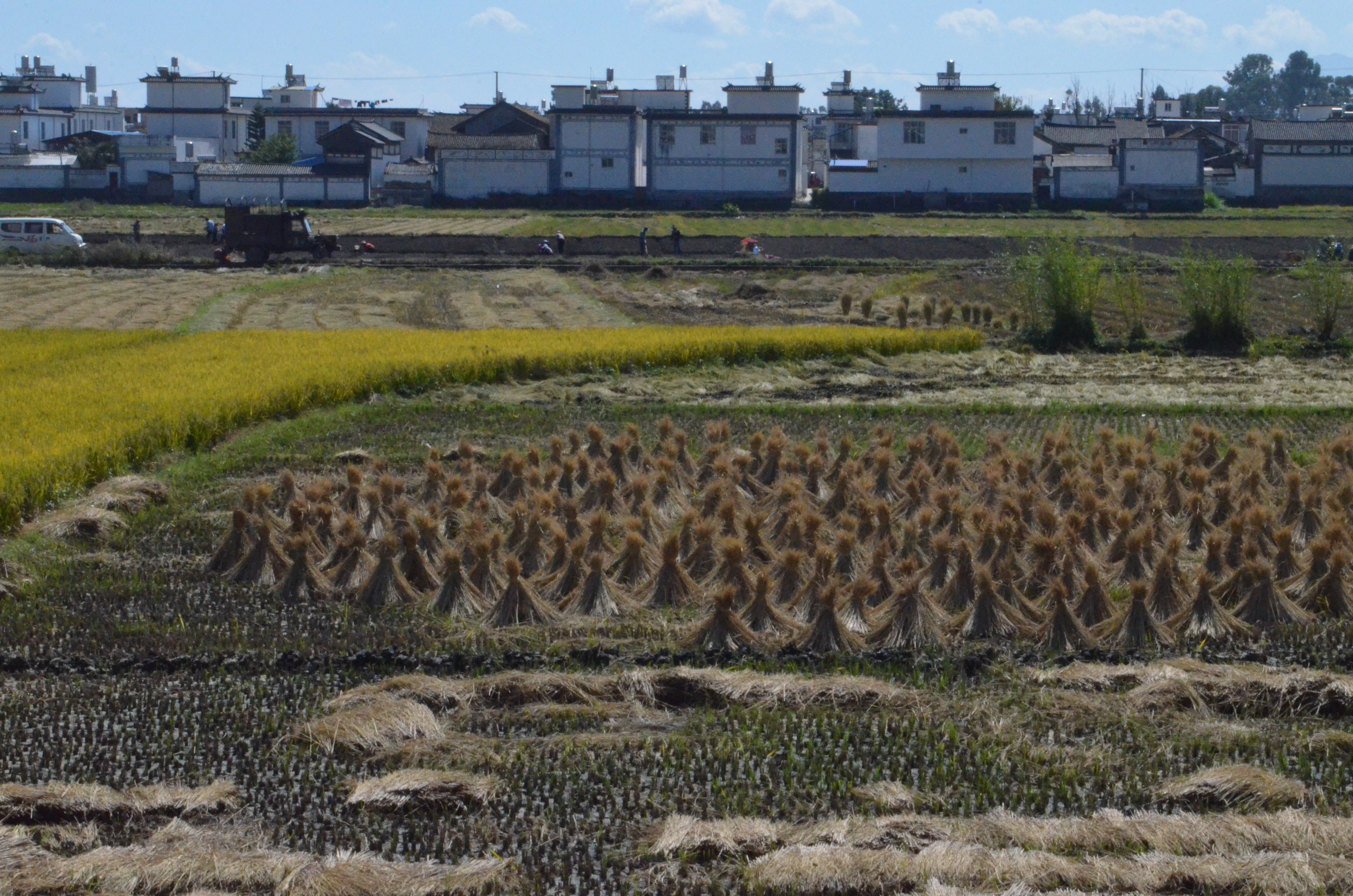
Rice harvest in Xizhou.

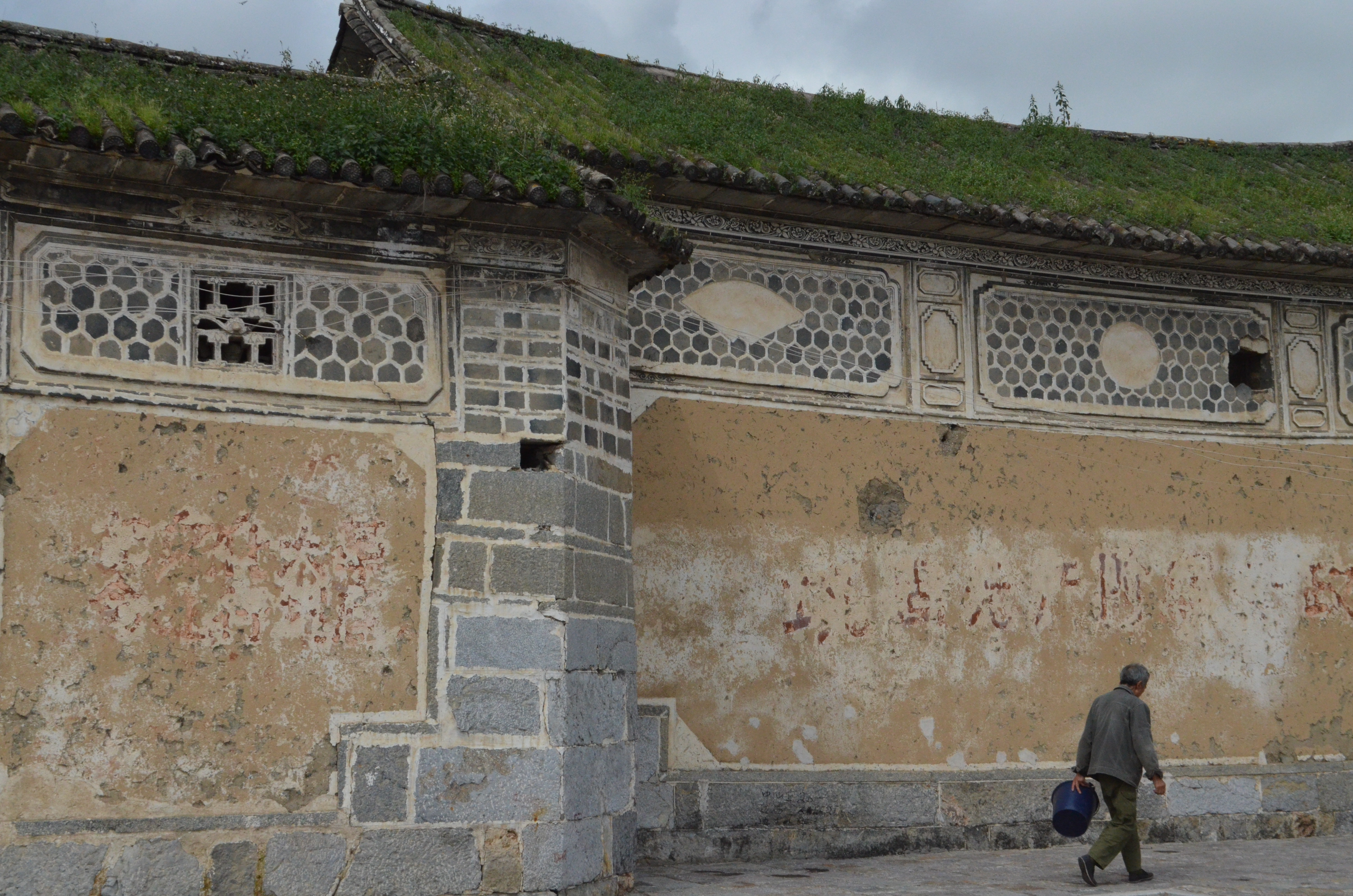
A man walks past an earthen wall in Xizhou.

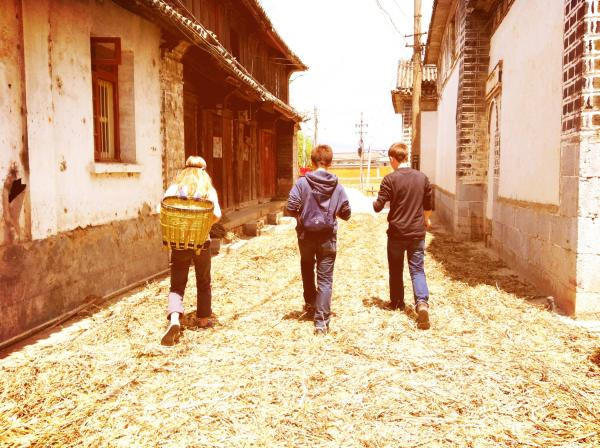
Three boys walk through the streets of Xizhou.
